= Baháʼí timeline =

The following is a basic timeline of the Bábí and Baháʼí religions emphasizing dates that are relatively well known. For a more comprehensive chronology of the timeline, see the references at the bottom.

== 1795 ==
- (1210 AH), Shaykhi sect is started by Shaykh Ahmad.

== 1817 ==
- November 12 / Muharram 2 1233 AH. Baháʼu'lláh is born. See also Twin Holy Birthdays.

== 1819 ==
- October 20 / Muharram 1 1235 AH. The Báb is born. See also Twin Holy Birthdays.

== 1826 ==
- Shaykh Ahmad dies and Siyyid Kázim is appointed leader of the Shaykhi sect.

== 1828 ==
- Mírzá Muhammad Ridá, the Father of the Báb, dies. The Báb is placed in the care of his maternal uncle, Hají Mirzá Siyyid 'Alí

== 1835 ==
- September 24 - October 22, Baháʼu'lláh marries Navváb.

== 1843 ==
- Siyyid Kázim dies. Before his death he instructs his students, including Mulla Husayn, to find the Promised One, the Mahdi.

== 1844 AD / 1 BE ==
- The Báb's first religious experience, witnessed by his wife, is dated to about the evening of April 3.
- (1260 AH), May 22, evening, the Báb declares his mission to Mulla Husayn in Shiraz, Iran.
- May 22–23, overnight, ʻAbdu'l-Bahá is born to Navváb and Baháʼu'lláh.
- By late September Baháʼu'lláh accepts the Bábí religion.

== 1845 AD / 2 BE ==
- September, restrictions are enforced on the Báb's movement within Shiraz after he declares himself to be the Mahdi publicly.
- Government reports initiate coverage in the West first mentions the arrest and imprisonment of Mullá 'Alíy-i-Bastámí of the Bábí religion. It was published in The Times of London November 1 and several times thereafter.

== 1846 / 3 BE ==
- Bahíyyih Khánum is born to Navváb and Baháʼu'lláh.
- September, the Báb leaves Shiraz for Isfahan.

== 1847 / 4 BE ==
- July, The Báb is imprisoned at Maku and writes the Bayán.

== 1848 / 5 BE ==
- Mírzá Mihdí is born to Navváb and Baháʼu'lláh.
- Munirih Khánum, wife of ʻAbdu'l-Bahá is born in Isfahan to prominent Bábís of the city.
- March 20, Mullá Husayn visits the Báb in Maku
- April 10, the Báb is moved to the prison of Chihriq, due to his growing influence in Maku. He was largely kept there until a few days before his execution.
- June - July, the Conference of Badasht was held.
- July, during public interrogation at Tabriz the Báb makes a dramatic public declaration. He is returned to Chihriq.
- July 21, Mullá Husayn hoists the Black Standard and marches with 202 other Bábís to Mashhad.
- October 10, Mullá Husayn and a host of other Bábís are besieged at fort Tabarsi.
- October 20, Quddús arrives at fort Tabarsí.

== 1849 AD / 6 BE ==
- Baháʼu'lláh marries Fátimih in Tihrán.
- February 2, Mullá Husayn dies in battle at fort at the Shrine of Shaykh Tabarsí.
- May 10, Battle of Fort Tabarsi ends after a negotiated surrender in which the victors promise to let the Bábís go. Immediately afterward, the victors break their oath and kill many of the defenders.
- May 16, Quddús is tortured and executed.

== 1850 AD / 7 BE ==
- July 9, the Báb is publicly executed in Tabriz.
- Brief newspaper coverage of the Bábí religion reaches several newspapers in Britain and the United States in the autumn.

== 1851 AD / 7-8 BE ==
Dr. Rev. Austin Wright sent materials of the Báb and a letter/paper about events related to the religion to the American Oriental Society - he wrote the letter February 1851 and it was published June. The letter/paper was published in June a Vermont newspaper as well. Some of it was also translated into German by his supervisor, Rev. Justin Perkins, and was thought for many years to have not been published in English though even in its German form Wright had been named as the first person to write a paper on the Bábí-Baháʼí period.

== 1852 AD / 9 BE ==
- August 15, angry Bábís (acting on their own volition) make a failed attempt to kill Nasser al-Din Shah, who retaliates by imprisoning Baháʼu'lláh and executing several thousands of Bábís, including Táhirih and Siyyid Husayn-i-Yazdi.
- September to December, while imprisoned for four months in the Síyáh-Chál in Tehran, Baháʼu'lláh receives the first intimations that he is the promised one foretold by the Báb.

== 1853 / 9 BE ==
- January 12, Baháʼu'lláh is exiled from Tehran to Baghdad.
- Mírzá Muhammad ʻAlí is born to Fátimih and Baháʼu'lláh in Baghdad

== 1854 / 11 BE ==
- April 10, Baháʼu'lláh retreats to the Sulaymaniyah mountains within Kurdistan due to a rising tensions between Mírzá Yahyá and himself.
- Henry Aaron Stern (1820-1885) published a book that mentions "Baba, the Persian socialist" for a couple pages.

== 1856 / 13 BE ==
- After being discovered in Kurdistan, Baháʼu'lláh returns to Baghdad, at the request of ʻAbdu'l-Bahá.
- Mary Sheil and Sir Justin Sheil publish Glimpses of the Life and Manners in Persia which has a section on Bábísm of some 14 pages.

== 1857 / 14 BE ==
- The Hidden Words and the Four Valleys are written by Baháʼu'lláh

== 1860 / 17 BE ==
- Seven Valleys are written by Baháʼu'lláh

== 1861 / 18 BE ==
- The Book of Certitude is written in late 1861 or early 1862 in two days and nights

== 1862 / 19 BE ==
- May 10, the Persian ambassador requests that the Ottomans move the Bábís farther from Persia.

== 1863 / 20 BE ==
- April 21, Baháʼu'lláh declares himself to be He whom God shall make manifest in the Garden of Ridván in Baghdad on the eve of his exile to Constantinople (Istanbul). (13 Jalal 20 BE)
- December 12, Baháʼu'lláh is exiled into formal confinement in Adrianople (Edirne) after four months in Constantinople. (1 Masa'il 20 BE)

== 1865 / 22 BE ==
- The Tablet of Ahmad is written by Baháʼu'lláh
- Arthur de Gobineau publishes book describing the Babí religion in French.

== 1867 / 24 BE ==
- 53 Baháʼís in Baghdad on March 16, 1867 petitioned the United States Congress for assistance for Baháʼu'lláh's release and for assistance for the Baháʼís in general.
- Baháʼu'lláh begins writing and sending his Tablets to the Kings.

== 1868 / 25 BE ==
- August 5, Baháʼu'lláh and a large group of followers are sent from Edirne to the penal colony of Akká, Palestine (now Acre, Israel).
- August 31, Baháʼu'lláh arrives in ʻAkká.

== 1869 / 26 BE ==
- Baháʼu'lláh sends a letter to the Shah of Persia, Nasser al-Din Shah, and the messenger, Badíʻ, is put to death.

== 1870 / 27 BE ==
- June 23, Mirzá Mihdí dies after falling through a skylight.

== 1873 / 30 BE ==
- Baháʼu'lláh writes the Kitáb-i-Aqdas.

== 1886 / 43 BE ==
- Navváb dies.
- Abdu'l-Bahá writes the original Arabic text of Traveller's Narrative later translated and published in 1891.

== 1889 / 46 BE ==
- February 25, E.G. Browne mentions the Baháʼí Faith as part of a series academic talks and papers through 1889 in England.

== 1890 / 47 BE ==
E. G. Browne, a famed Cambridge orientalist interviewed Baháʼu'lláh and was His guest at Bahjí from 15 April to 20 April 1890. Browne was the only Westerner to meet Baháʼu'lláh and leave an account of his experience. In Browne's 1893 publication entitled A Year Among the Persians, he wrote a sympathetic portrayal of Persian society. After his death in 1926 it was reprinted and became a classic in English travel literature. Browne described Baháʼu'lláh as, "The face of Him on Whom I gazed, I can never forget, though I cannot describe it. Those piercing eyes seemed to read one's very soul; power and authority sat on that ample brow… No need to ask in whose presence I stood, as I bowed myself before one who is the object of a devotion and love which kings might envy and emperors sigh for in vain..."

== 1892 / 49 BE ==
- May 29, Baháʼu'lláh dies, his mortal remains are placed in a Shrine dedicated to him next to the Mansion of Bahjí where he spent his final years. In his will he appointed ʻAbdu'l-Bahá to be his successor and head of the Baháʼí Faith.

== 1893 / 50 BE ==
- September 23, the Baháʼí Faith is mentioned publicly for the first time in America in an address by Dr. Henry H. Jessup at the World Parliament of Religions in Chicago.

== 1894 / 51 BE ==
- Thornton Chase is the first of five Baháʼís in the United States this year

== 1897 / 54 BE ==
- March 1, Shoghi Effendi, the great-grandson of Baháʼu'lláh, is born.

== 1898 / 55 BE ==
- The first Western pilgrims arrive in ʻAkká, including Phoebe Hearst and the first African-American believer, Robert Turner.

== 1900 / 58 BE ==
Sarah Farmer, founder of Green Acre Baháʼí School, meets ʻAbdu'l-Bahá and converts.

== 1901 / 59 BE ==
- The cornerstone of first Baháʼí House of Worship, in ʻIshqábád (Ashgabat), Turkmenistan, is laid.
- Thomas Breakwell becomes the first Englishman Baháʼí.
- The first talks on the religion are held at Green Acre.

== 1903 / 60 BE ==
- More than 100 Baháʼís are killed in the first significant persecution of Baháʼís of the century in Yazd, Iran.

== 1908 / 65 BE ==
- September, ʻAbdu'l-Bahá is released from a lifetime of exile and imprisonment at 64 years of age.

== 1909 / 66 BE ==
- March 21, the mortal remains of the Báb are laid to rest in the Shrine of the Báb after 59 years in hiding.

== 1910 / 67 BE ==
- August ʻAbdu'l-Bahá arrives in Egypt. See ʻAbdu'l-Bahá's journeys to the West
- Mary Maxwell, later to be known as Rúhíyyih Khanum, is born in New York City

== 1911 / 68 BE ==
- August–December, ʻAbdu'l-Bahá travels across Europe visiting cities such as London, Bristol, and Paris. See ʻAbdu'l-Bahá's journeys to the West
- September 10, ʻAbdu'l-Bahá gives his first address to a Western audience in City Temple, London. English translation spoken by Wellesley Tudor Pole.

== 1912 / 69 BE ==
- April 11, ʻAbdu'l-Bahá arrives in New York City for his visit to North America. See ʻAbdu'l-Bahá's journeys to the West.
- ʻAbdu'l-Bahá dedicates the cornerstone Nettie Tobin brought for the planned North American Baháʼí House of Worship in Wilmette, IL.
- December 5, ʻAbdu'l-Bahá sets sail away from North America, heading back to Europe.

== 1916 / 73 BE ==
- ʻAbdu'l-Bahá writes the first eight of the fourteen Tablets of the Divine Plan.

== 1917 / 74 BE ==
- ʻAbdu'l-Bahá writes six more Tablets of the Divine Plan.

== 1918 / 75 BE ==
- September 19, ʻAbdu'l-Bahá is threatened with death just before the Ottoman military is destroyed at the Battle of Megiddo.

== 1920 / 76 BE ==
- April 27, ʻAbdu'l-Bahá is knighted by the British Empire in recognition of his humanitarian work during WWI.

== 1921 / 77 BE ==
- November 28, ʻAbdu'l-Bahá dies in Haifa and appoints Shoghi Effendi as the Guardian in his Will and Testament.

== 1932 ==
- July 15, Baháʼu'lláh's daughter Bahíyyih Khánum dies.

== 1935 ==
- Shoghi Effendi translates the Gleanings from the Writings of Baháʼu'lláh from Persian and Arabic into English.

== 1937 ==
- Mírzá Muhammad ʻAlí, labeled the arch-Covenant breaker by ʻAbdu'l-Bahá, dies.
- Shoghi Effendi launches the "Divine Plan" for the diffusion the Baháʼí Faith across the globe.
- Shoghi Effendi marries Mary Maxwell, later known as Rúhíyyih Khanum, the daughter of a prominent Canadian Baháʼí.

== 1944 AD / 101 BE ==
- Shoghi Effendi releases God Passes By to mark the 100th anniversary of the Baháʼí dispensation, which commenced with the Declaration of the Bab in 1844 AD / 1 BE.

== 1951 ==
- Eleven functioning National Spiritual Assemblies exist in the world.
- 32 additional "Hands of the Cause of God" are appointed by Shoghi Effendi.
- The International Baháʼí Council, first multi-national Baháʼí body, is appointed by Shoghi Effendi.

== 1953 ==
- Shoghi Effendi launches the Ten Year Crusade.
- The North American Baháʼí House of Worship is dedicated in Wilmette, IL.
- The superstructure of the Shrine of the Báb is completed.

== 1957 ==
- November 4, Shoghi Effendi dies without children and without appointing a successor Guardian. The temporary role of 'Head of the Faith' is taken up by 27 Hands of the Cause with plans to complete the Ten Year Crusade and elect the Universal House of Justice.

== 1960 ==
- Hand-of-the-Cause Mason Remey claims to be Effendi's successor Guardian. The other living Hands of the Cause and almost all of the Baha'i community reject his claim.

== 1963 ==
- A wave of persecution of Baháʼís in Morocco ends in mid April with a royal pardon against death sentences for being Baháʼí in Morocco after months of diplomatic newspaper. and television coverage in the United States.
- April 21, the first Baháʼí World Congress takes place in London. The first Universal House of Justice is elected by representatives of 56 National Spiritual Assemblies gathered in Haifa, in synchronization with the end of the Ten Year Crusade and the centenary of the Declaration of Baháʼu'lláh in the Garden of Ridván.

== 1968 ==
- Second election of the Universal House of Justice

== 1973 ==
- Third election of the Universal House of Justice

== 1978 ==
- Fourth election of the Universal House of Justice

== 1979 ==
- Iran's Islamic Revolution begins multi-generation Persecution of Baháʼís with over 200 killed by 2006.

== 1983 ==
- January 31, the Universal House of Justice takes up its permanent seat on the slopes of Mt Carmel.
- Fifth election of the Universal House of Justice

== 1985 ==
- October, the Universal House of Justice publishes The Promise of World Peace

== 1986 ==
- December 24, the Indian Baháʼí House of Worship (aka the "Lotus Temple") is dedicated.

== 1987 ==
- Sixth election of the Universal House of Justice

== 1992 ==
- April 21, a Holy year begins marking the centenary of the death of Baháʼu'lláh.
- November 22 - 26th, the second Baháʼí World Congress takes place in New York.
- The Ruhi Institute reaches a milestone in development as a formal organization, although its efforts have been evolving since the 1970s by the FUNDAEC Foundation.

== 1993 AD / 150 BE ==
- March 21, the Kitáb-i-Aqdas is released in English with notes, question and answers, supplementary materials and synopsis and codification. (1 Baha 150 BE)
- Seventh election of the Universal House of Justice

== 1998 ==
- Eighth election of the Universal House of Justice

== 2000 ==
- January 19, Rúhíyyih Khanum dies, representing the last remnant of the family of Baháʼu'lláh who remained loyal to Shoghi Effendi and the Universal House of Justice.

== 2001 ==
- The terraces on Mount Carmel are completed, surrounding the Shrine of the Báb and the Arc.
- there are 182 National Spiritual assemblies representing most of the countries of the planet (see Worldwide Baháʼí statistics)

== 2003 ==
- Ninth election of the Universal House of Justice

== 2006 ==
- March 20 Iranian Islamic Revolution government documents are released by the Special Rapporteur of the United Nations. The Anti-defamation League notes these government policies signify steps towards Nuremberg-type laws (see monitoring activities of Baháʼís)
- the Supreme Constitutional Court on December 16 rules against the Baháʼís, a key event of the Egyptian identification card controversy.

== 2008 ==
- The Universal House of Justice announced the convocation in October of a series of 41 regional conferences around the world which finished by March 2009.
- Tenth election of the Universal House of Justice

== 2013 ==
- Eleventh election of the Universal House of Justice

== See also ==
- Outline of the Baháʼí Faith
- History of the Baháʼí Faith
- The Dawn-Breakers
- Advent of Divine Justice
