= Mírzá Mihdí =

Son of Baháʼí founder Baháʼu'lláh and his wife Ásíyih Khánum

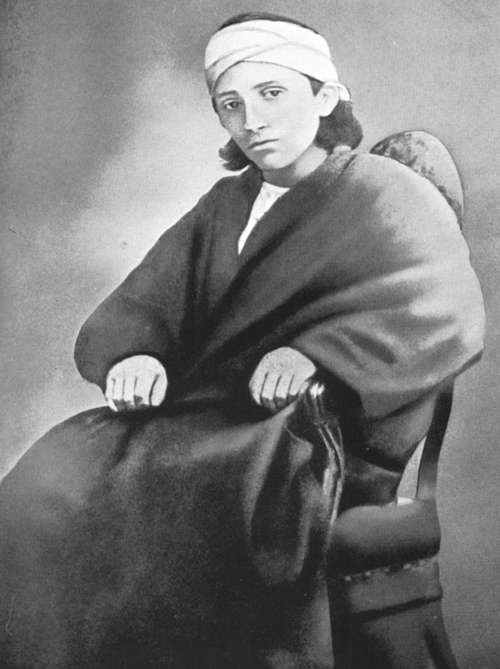
Mirzá Mihdí in 1868, aged 20.

Mírzá Mihdí (Persian: میرزا مهدی 1848 – June 23, 1870) was the youngest child of Baháʼí Faith founder Baháʼu'lláh and his wife Ásíyih Khánum. He was given the title G͟husn-i-Athar ("Purest Branch" or "Purer Branch"). (Note: The elative is a stage of gradation in Arabic that can be used both for a superlative or a comparative. G͟husn-i-Athar could mean "Purest Branch" or "Purer Branch.")

== Early life ==
He was born in Tehran with the given name of Mihdí in 1848. Since birth, he held the style of Mirza as the son of an aristocrat. His Father was Bahá’u’lláh, Son of a court minister Mírzá `Abbás Núrí. His mother, Ásíyih Khánum was the daughter of nobility from Mazandaran. He was named after his deceased paternal uncle, who Bahá’u’lláh had been close to. Mírzá Mihdí was four when his Father was arrested, their home looted, and the family reduced to near poverty. At its worst, his mother was forced to feed the children flour to satiate their hunger. In 1852, Bahá’u’lláh was exiled to Baghdad but due to his ill-health, Mírzá Mihdí was left with relatives in Tehran.

== Returning to his family, 1860 – 1868 ==
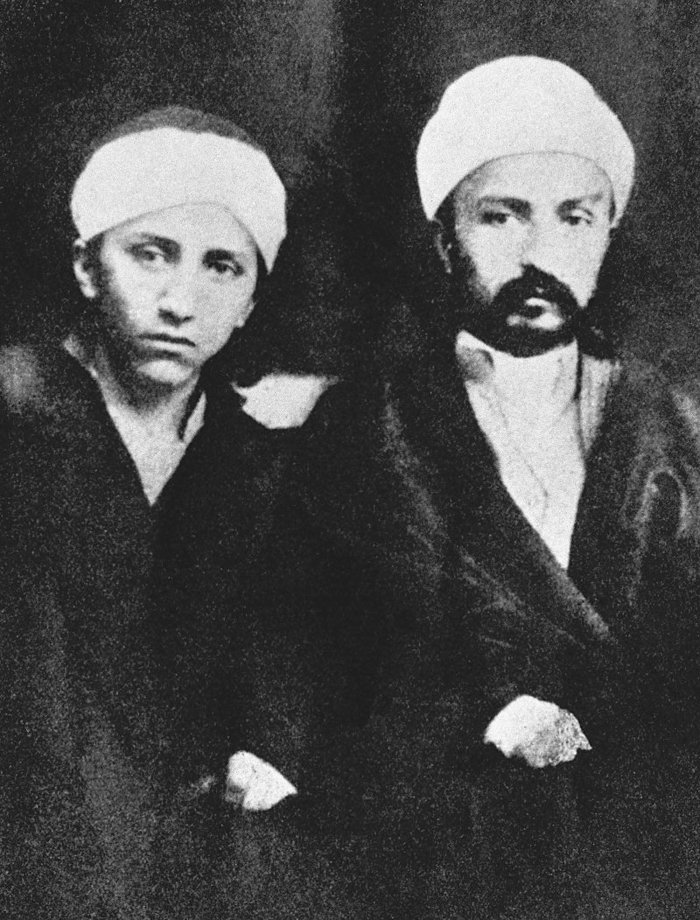
ʻAbdu'l-Bahá and Mírzá Mihdí (left).

Mírzá Mihdí was reunited with his family in 1860 and grew very close to his father. He served Bahá’u’lláh as his secretary, transcribing letters on his behalf. Mírzá Mihdí accompanied Bahá’u’lláh in His successive exiles to Istanbul, Edirne, and, finally, to Akka. Bahá’u’lláh (who described his family as a tree) entitled Mírzá Mihdí as "The Purest Branch".

== Exile to Acre and death, 1868 ==
In the summer of 1868, Bahá’u’lláh and his family were condemned to perpetual imprisonment in the penal-colony of Akka, Palestine, Ottoman Empire (later became Acre, Israel after 1948). The family was housed in a cluster of dilapidated cells. Mírzá Mihdí occupied a cell with his mother and his sister Bahíyyih Khánum.

It was common practice for the prisoners to use the roof for exercise in the summer months. Mírzá Mihdí was pacing the roof reciting the Ode of the Dove (a prayer revealed by his father). Wrapped in prayer, he fell through the skylight in the roof of the prison onto a crate lying on the floor below. The family heard the crash and rushed to the scene to find Mihdí covered in blood. He was so badly injured that his clothes had to be torn from him. Prison guards allowed for a doctor to attend to him, but by that time the injuries were too severe. As he lay dying, Mírzá Mihdí told Bahá’u’lláh he wished that pilgrims (many of whom walked from Iran but were denied the chance to meet Bahá’u’lláh) would be permitted to enter Acre.

Mírzá Mihdí died with his father beside him on 23 June 1870. His father had to sell a small carpet in his cell to fund the hastily prepared funeral, that no family were permitted to attend.

== Legacy ==
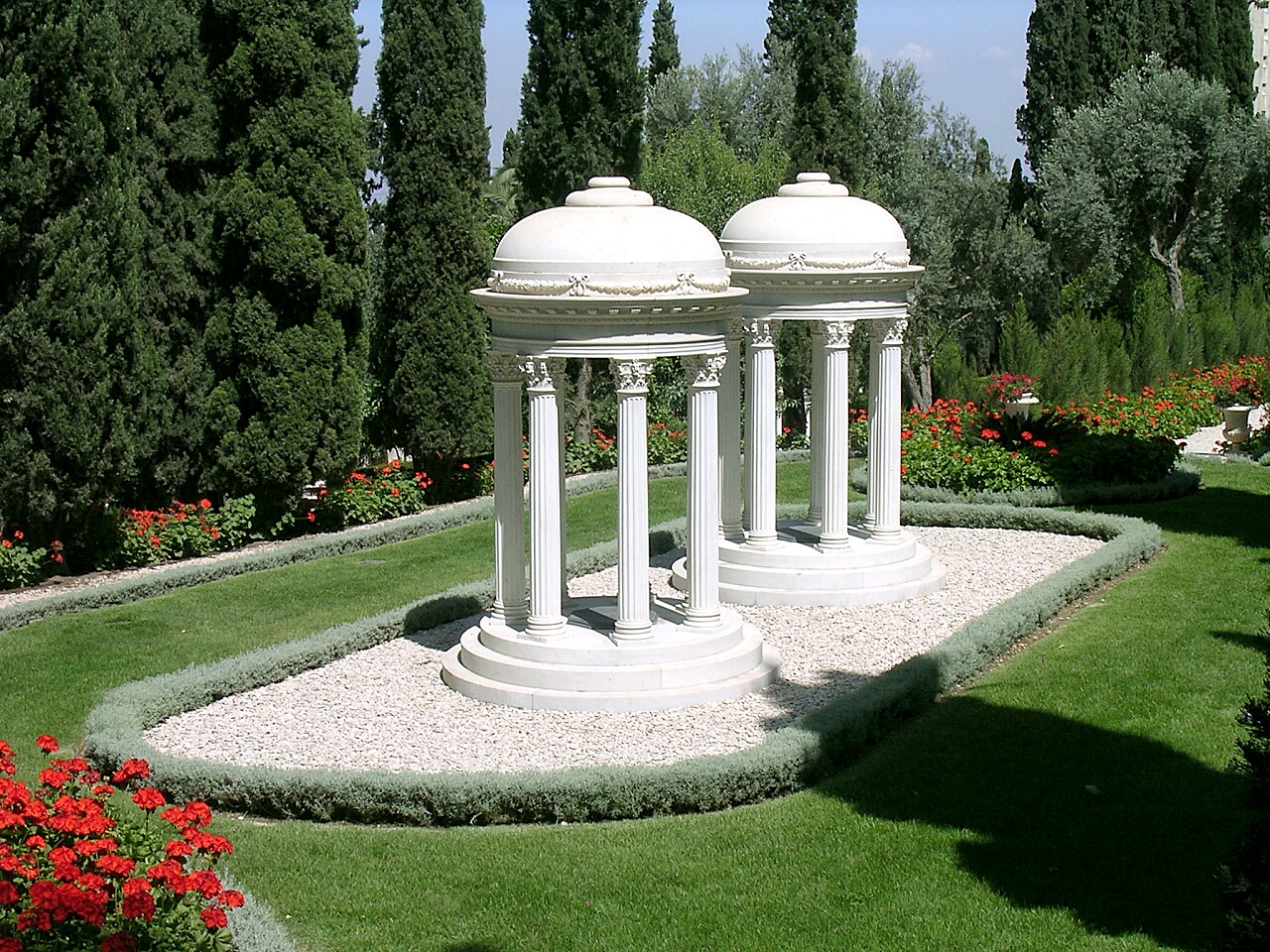
The graves of Navváb and Mirzá Mihdí within the Monument Gardens.

The sudden and unexpected death of Mírzá Mihdí brought deep sadness to his parents and destroyed any morale that was left among the prisoners. His mother was so overcome with grief that family members feared she would never recover. His sister collected the blood-soaked clothes of Mihdí and other relics. These are seen in the International Archives in Israel. Baháʼu'lláh eulogized his son and connected the subsequent easing of restrictions and pilgrims' ability to visit him to Mihdí's dying prayer.

Shoghi Effendi later removed the body of Mírzá Mihdí and reinterred it alongside his mother, in the gardens below the Arc on Mount Carmel, Haifa, in an area now called the Monument Gardens. He then cabled the Baháʼís:

Blessed remains Purest Branch and Master's mother safely transferred hallowed precincts Shrines Mount Carmel. Long inflicted humiliation wiped away. Machinations Covenant-breakers frustrate plan defeated. Cherished wish Greatest Holy Leaf fulfilled. Sister brother mother wife ʻAbdu'l-Bahá reunited one spot designed constitute focal centre Baháʼí Administrative Institutions at Faith's World Centre. Share joyful news entire body American believers. Shoghi Rabbani.

His resting-place now serves as a place of pilgrimage for Bahá’ís.

== Appearance and personality ==
In physical appearance Mírzá Mihdí grew to resemble `Abdu'l-Bahá with blue eyes, dark hair and a fair complexion but was taller. Mírzá Mihdí was remembered as gentle and self-effacing by contemporaries, winning him the affection of the exiled Bahá'í community.

== See also ==
Others buried in the Monument Gardens:

- Ásíyih Khánum, Baháʼu'lláh's first wife, Mirzá Mihdí's mother (also called Nawab).
- Bahíyyih Khánum, Mirzá Mihdí's elder sister.
- Munírih Khánum, wife of ʻAbdu'l-Bahá, Mirzá Mihdí's elder brother.

== Notes and citations ==
Notes

Citations
