= Bahíyyih Khánum =

Daughter of Baháʼu'lláh, founder of the Baháʼí Faith, and Ásíyih Khánum

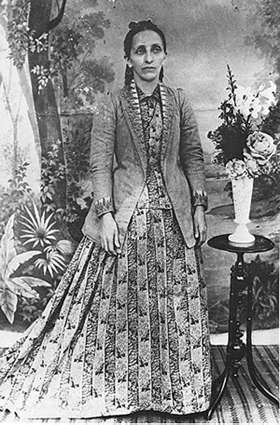
- Bahíyyih Khánum in 1895

Personal life
- Born: Fátimih Núrí; Late 1846/early 1847 Tehran, Sublime State of Persia
- Died: 15 July 1932 (aged 86) Haifa, Mandatory Palestine
- Resting place: Monument Gardens; 32°48′52.59″N 34°59′14.17″E
- Parent(s): Baháʼu'lláh (father); Ásíyih Khánum (mother)
- Relatives: Shoghi Effendi (great-nephew)

Religious life
- Religion: Baháʼí Faith

Bahíyyih Khánum (1846 – 15 July 1932) was the only daughter of Baháʼu'lláh, the founder of the Baháʼí Faith, and Ásíyih Khánum. She was born in 1846 with the given name Fatimih Sultan, and was entitled "Varaqiy-i-'Ulyá" or "Greatest Holy Leaf". Brought up through the trying times her family lived through, in adulthood she served the interests of the religion and was even quite often entrusted with running the affairs of the religion. Greatly favoured by Bahá'u'lláh, she is seen within the Baháʼí Faith as one of the greatest women to have lived. According to Baháʼís, every dispensation has one particular holy woman or "immortal heroine". In the time of Jesus it was the Virgin Mary, the time of Muhammad it was his daughter Fatima Zahra and during the Báb's dispensation it was Táhirih. Baháʼís believe that Bahíyyih Khánum is the outstanding heroine of the Baháʼí dispensation.

== During the lifetime of her father ==
=== Tehran, 1846−1852 ===
Born into a family of means in Tehran, she recalls her parents being admired for their service to the poor. Baháʼí scholar Baharieh Ma'ani writes that Bahíyyih Khánum was born in probably late 1846 or early 1847.

Bahíyyih Khánum's early years were filled with happiness, as she fondly recalled the joy of playing in the beautiful gardens alongside her brother `Abdu'l-Bahá. Bahíyyih Khánum spent her early years in an environment of privilege, wealth, and love. Raised in an atmosphere of affluence, her family's Tehran residence and country houses were not only comfortable but also beautifully decorated. Bahíyyih Khánum, along with her brothers ʻAbbás and Mihdí, enjoyed the privileges that came with their social status. Their idyllic life took a turn when her father was arrested in 1852 and confined to the infamous Síyáh-Chál. At the age of five, Bahíyyih witnessed the confiscation of their family home and the plundering of its furnishings. Hearing the Bábís being rounded up left an indelible mark on her, as she vividly remembered the shrieks of the mobs.

=== Baghdad, 1852−1863 ===
In January 1853, Baháʼu'lláh faced banishment to Baghdad, and the journey from Tehran to Baghdad proved arduous, navigating through snow-covered mountains. Upon their arrival in Baghdad, Bahíyyih Khánum recalled her father actively participating in household chores. During Baháʼu'lláh's temporary absence from Baghdad, her uncle Mirza Yahya, the nominal head of the Bábí religion, assumed the role of household head. According to her own account, Mirza Yahya imposed strict restrictions on her, prohibiting her from playing with other children and preventing a doctor from attending to her newly born brother, who desperately needed medical attention — ultimately resulting in his death. The mutual grief and sorrow which ʻAbdu'l-Bahá, her mother and she felt led them to be constant companions of each other: "I remember so clearly the sorrow of those days" she later remarked. When Baháʼu'lláh arrived after nearly two years of seclusion the family were overjoyed. Bahíyyih Khánum reflected how she was in a "breathless state of expectancy" waiting to see Baháʼu'lláh.

In Baghdad Bahíyyih blossomed into a young woman, known for her dignity, gentleness, decorum, kindness, and reserved demeanor in public. Shoghi Effendi, reflecting on her teenage years, remarked that she was entrusted with missions that "no girl of her age could, or would be willing to, perform." Giving a rare glimpse into the circumstances of her father's declaration of being a messenger of God in the Garden of Ridvan in Baghdad, Bahíyyih Khánum is reported to have said that Baháʼu'lláh stated his claim to his son ʻAbdu'l-Bahá and four others.

=== Constantinople/Adrianople, 1863−1868 ===
By May 1863 Baháʼu'lláh was exiled next to Constantinople, the capital of the Ottoman Empire, and his family went with him. After arriving in Constantinople, Bahíyyih Khánum renounced the idea of marriage. This was very strange for a woman of her rank and era, however it was a request which Baháʼu'lláh willingly accepted. After a short while in Constantinople the family was again exiled to Adrianople. Bahíyyih Khánum describes how she was a strong young woman until the journey to Adrianople. Adrianople proved a very unhappy period for the young Bahíyyih Khánum.

She was 20 at the time of Baháʼu'lláh's poisoning. She was well aware of the fact that she could be separated from her father and Bahíyyih Khánum comforted her mother and brother when the family heard they were to be exiled separately. Remarking on her role in the 1868 split between Mirza Yahya and Baháʼu'lláh, Shoghi Effendi notes Bahíyyih Khánum was among the most active in encouraging the Bábís to accept the claims of her father.

=== Acre, 1868−1870 ===
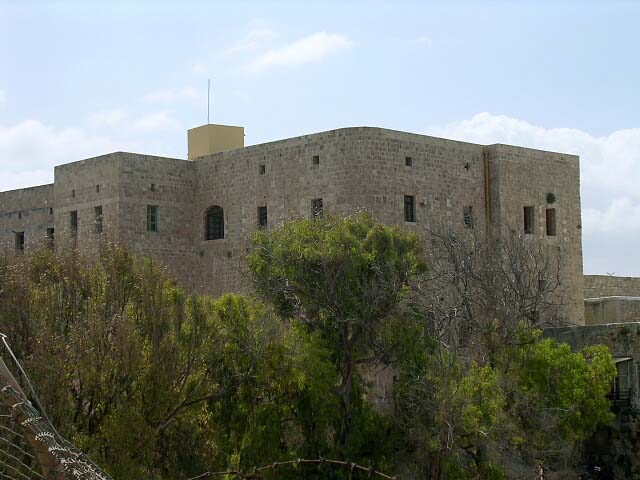
Prison in Acre in which Bahíyyih and her family were imprisoned

In July 1868 the Ottoman government further banished Baháʼu'lláh and his family to the prison-city of Acre, then part of the Syrian segment of the Ottoman Empire. As a young woman of 21, Bahíyyih Khánum entered into Acre as a prisoner. This was her fourth place of exile, and her last. Despite being in her early 20s — she was still determined to remain unmarried. Arriving on the bay of Acre, the exiles were disorientated and demoralized. The populace spoke Arabic, which Bahíyyih Khánum understood, and she overheard them mocking and jeering how the family were to be thrown into the sea or imprisoned in chains. She later explained the impact this had on her: "imagine, if you can, the overpowering impression made by all this upon the mind of a young girl, such as I was then. Can you wonder that I am serious, and that my life is different from those of my countrywomen?".

Food was scarce and Bahiyyih Khánum remembers Baháʼu'lláh giving up food for the feeding of children in the group. The family were locked in a small cluster of cells which were covered in dirt and sewage, so much so that Bahiyyih Khánum fainted a number of times, "of my own experience perhaps this is the most awful". The period was distressing for Bahiyyih Khánum, as it was for many of the Baháʼís, due to the death of three Baháʼís and hostile behaviour of the surrounding population; in particular the death of Mírzá Mihdí, Bahiyyih Khánum's youngest brother, destroyed any morale which was left. She gathered and kept his blood-stained clothes after he died in 1870.

=== Later in Acre, 1870−1892 ===
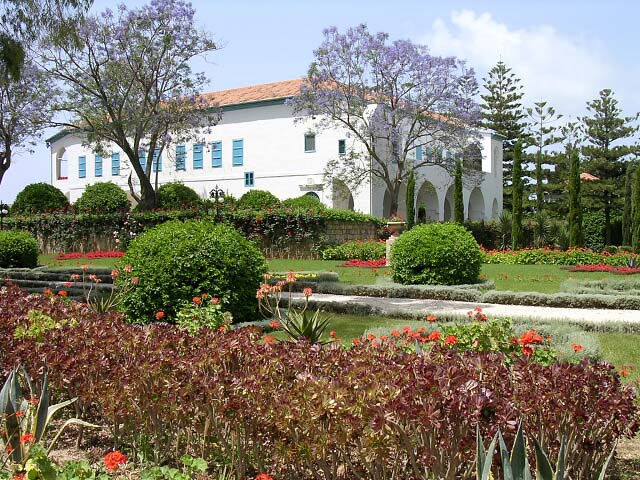
The "Mansion" of Bahjí

After the death of her brother in 1870, the people of Acre started to respect the Baháʼís and in particular, ʻAbdu'l-Bahá. ʻAbdu'l-Bahá was able to arrange for houses to be rented for the family, and the family later moved to the Mansion of Bahjí around 1879 when an epidemic caused the inhabitants to flee. Bahíyyih was 23 when she left the harsh prison. Despite the unhappy start, Acre was the place of some of the happiest times of Bahíyyih Khánum's life. With ʻAbdu'l-Bahá's marriage to Munírih, she had a companion of the same age and the two became close friends of each other. The Baháʼís realised that it was unlikely Bahíyyih Khánum would ever marry and she was respected for her choice. Bahíyyih Khánum helped her mother and father with serving pilgrims who came and visited the family. Bahíyyih was very close to her father, and he wrote to her: "how sweet thy presence before Me; how sweet to gaze upon thy face, to bestow upon thee My loving-kindness, to favour thee with My tender care".

One of the heartaches of Bahíyyih Khánum was the death of her mother in 1886. She had been very close to her mother since childhood and the death left Bahíyyih with a void in her life. With the death of her mother, Navváb in 1886, Baháʼu'lláh gave her the title of "the Greatest Holy Leaf", and she took over the role of head of the household — managing the household and hosting events for the women pilgrims and other visitors — an arrangement that continued when ʻAbdu'l-Bahá was head of the religion. Six years passed when – in 1892 – her father died. Bahíyyih was distraught at the loss of her father. With her father's death in 1892 she was the only surviving member of her family to choose to support her brother when he was named head of the religion in 1892, though first she had to recover from severe mourning which caused her to become thin and feeble for a time. Bahiyyih Nakhjavani has characterized her as having a sleepless vigilance, a tact, courtesy, extreme patience and an heroic fortitude.

== Religious role ==
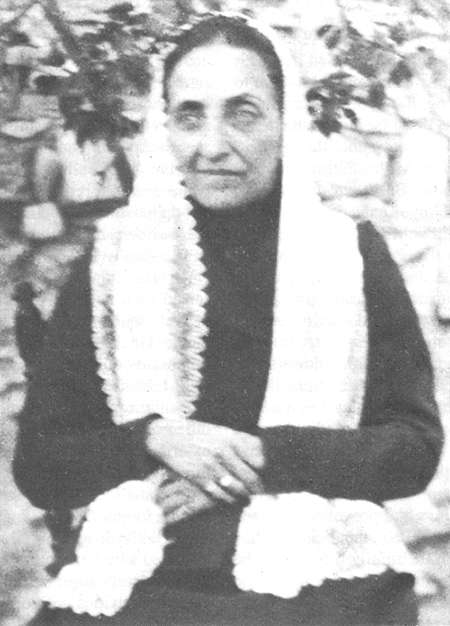
Bahíyyih, known as "the Greatest Holy Leaf".

=== First Western pilgrims ===
It was in 1898 that the first Western pilgrims visited ʻAbdu'l-Bahá and Bahíyyih in Palestine, including Phoebe Hearst, Lua Getsinger, Ella Goodall Cooper, the first African-American Baháʼí Robert Turner, and May Maxwell, amongst others. Despite her poor health, Bahíyyih Khánum received these pilgrims. The pilgrimage profoundly affected Bahíyyih Khánum and was a source of happiness for ʻAbdu'l-Bahá's family in the penal colony. Due to cultural and religious attitudes in Acre, Bahíyyih spent more of her time with the female pilgrims rather than the male ones. Lady Blomfield writes that Bahíyyih Khánum was "passionately attached", to her brother and the memory of her parents. She describes her "sense of humour", and "remarkable" intelligence. Shortly after the pilgrimage, Bahíyyih wrote a letter to a Persian Baháʼí woman writing:

A number of your spiritual sisters, namely the handmaidens who have embraced His Cause, have arrived here from Paris and the United States on pilgrimage. They recently reached this blessed and luminous Spot and have had the honour to prostrate themselves at His Holy Threshold and to behold the radiant face of ʻAbdu'l-Bahá, the Centre of the Covenant of Almighty God — may my life be offered up as a sacrifice for His sake. We have now the pleasure of their company and commune with them in a spirit of utmost love and fellowship. They all send loving greetings and salutations to you through the language of the heart.

=== Freedom ===
In 1908, the Young Turks freed all political prisoners under the Ottoman regime and Bahíyyih Khánum was declared free. She was only 21 when she entered the penal colony, and when freed was in her 60s. ʻAbdu'l-Bahá entrusted her with the remains of the Báb when they arrived in Acre on 31 January 1899, and were housed in her room in the house of ʻAbdu'lláh Páshá. The portraits of Baháʼu'lláh and the Báb and other relics were likewise kept by her except during World War I, when she along with the rest of ʻAbdu'l-Bahá's family, and Americans Edith Sanderson and Lua Getsinger, stayed in the residence of the village head of Abu Sinan. ʻAbdu'l-Bahá also entrusted her with keeping his last will and testament.

With her newfound freedom, Bahíyyih publicly began her charitable endeavours. She opened up an orphanage in her home for non-Baháʼí and Baháʼí children, oversaw their education and taught them "prayers, reading and writing, home management, embroidery, sewing, cooking" amongst others. As "head of the household" Bahíyyih was in control of looking after the numerous pilgrims from the East and West who flocked to visit her and ʻAbdu'l-Bahá. She also won the respect and affections of the locals. Women from Islamic background would ask Bahíyyih to cut the shrouds in which they would wear when they die so they could rest in peace. In her memoirs, Margaret Randall writes that "everyone turned [to her] for help and advice. She was gentle and loving, but strong, too."

In 1914 World War I began which affected the Palestine area. The communication between ʻAbdu'l-Bahá and the worldwide Baháʼí community came almost to a stand still. Furthermore, Haifa was gravely affected by the food shortage. It was through this that Bahíyyih further exercised her humanitarian services. She and her brother gave out their large store of grain to the poor and needy of the area. It was reported that the inhabitants flocked to the house of ʻAbdu'l-Bahá where Bahíyyih cooked for them and gave them rations. The humanitarian services that ʻAbdu'l-Bahá and Bahíyyih gave during the war, won them admiration amongst the British government and ʻAbdu'l-Bahá was knighted.

=== Headship ===
She was given the position of acting head of the religion repeatedly including during ʻAbdu'l-Bahá's journeys to the West between 1910 and 1913 when she was in her 60s, and then again when Shoghi Effendi was away on several trips between 1922 and 1924 when she was in her 70s. This role of leadership is a rare position for a woman to be in, historically. In 1910 she was appointed head of the faith by ʻAbdu'l-Bahá whilst on his protracted travels to the West. During this period Bahíyyih Khánum dealt with the affairs of the Bahá'í World Centre and outside. These included meeting dignitaries, making speeches on ʻAbdu'l-Bahá's behalf, meeting officials of both sexes and offering medical help for the sick and poor. Bahíyyih also dealt with the spiritual and administrative guidance of the worldwide Baháʼí community which entailed writing letters of encouragement to communities around the world. She kept in constant correspondence with her brother during this period.

In 1921, ʻAbdu'l-Bahá died and Bahíyyih Khánum sent telegrams, with the assistance of Saichiro Fujita, announcing the death which arrived at, among other places, Wellesley Tudor Pole's home in London where it was read by Shoghi Effendi. As Shoghi Effendi assumed the leadership of the religion, he commented in particular how he felt Bahiyyih Khánum's support during the difficult period following the death of ʻAbdu'l-Bahá. Again, Bahíyyih was named head of the faith in 1922. Assisting her was a committee who could not act without Bahíyyih's signature. She taught believers the provisions of the will and testament of ʻAbdu'l-Bahá. She encouraged the Baháʼí women of Persia particularly to involve themselves in Baháʼí activities, and explained the provisions of the Covenant of Baháʼu'lláh. Her letters of encouragement to the Baháʼí communities provided solace for the community who were mourning the death of ʻAbdu'l-Bahá. One letter reads:

At the time when Christ rose out of this mortal world and ascended into the Eternal Kingdom, He had twelve disciples, and even of these, one was cast off. But because that handful of souls stood up, and with selflessness, devotion and detachment, resolved to spread His holy Teachings and to scatter abroad the sweet fragrances of God, disregarding the world and all its peoples, and because they utterly lost themselves in Christ—they succeeded, by the power of the spirit, in capturing the cities of men's hearts, so that the splendour of the one true God pervaded all the earth, and put the darkness of ignorance to flight.

She was greatly respected and had instructed all Baháʼís to follow Shoghi Effendi through several telegrams she had sent around the world announcing the basics of the provisions of ʻAbdu'l-Bahá's will and was witness to the events relatives took in violation of provisions of the will. Bahíyyih Khánum had devoted much of her life towards protecting the accepted leadership of the Baháʼí Faith and after Shoghi Effendi's appointment there was little internal opposition until after her death when nephews began to openly oppose Shoghi Effendi over Baháʼu'lláh's house in Baghdad. She stood faithful to the Covenant of Baháʼu'lláh over years of infighting within Baháʼu'lláh's family that led to the excommunication of many of them.

== Death ==
During the late 1920s, Bahíyyih Khánum's health began to seriously deteriorate. Plagued by illness and pains, she was living an uncomfortable life. Pilgrims note that she found it hard visiting the grave of her father and the Báb, and needed help to stand and sit. She was noted for spending hours in vigils, prayers and meditation. Bahíyyih Khánum died on 15 July 1932, a few weeks after Keith Ransom-Kehler reached her homeland in her name. Shoghi Effendi marked her death by stating that the Heroic Age of the Baháʼí Faith was closed. Shoghi Effendi sent this telegram:

Greatest Holy Leaf's immortal spirit winged its flight Great Beyond. Countless lovers her saintly life in East and West seized with pangs of anguish. Plunged in utterable sorrow humanity shall ere long recognize its irreparable loss. Our beloved Faith, well nigh crushed by devastating blow of ʻAbdu'l-Bahá's unexpected Ascension, now laments passing of last remnant of Baháʼu'lláh, its most exalted member. Holy Family cruelly divested of its most precious great Adorning. I for my part bewail sudden removal of my sole earthly sustainer, the joy and solace of my life. Remains will repose in the vicinity of the Holy Shrines. So grievous a bereavement necessitates suspension for nine months through Baháʼí world every manner religious festivity. Inform Local Assemblies and groups hold in befitting manner memorial gatherings to extol a life so laden with sacred experiences, so rich in imperishable memories. Advise holding additional Commemoration Service of strictly devotional character in the Auditorium of the Mashriqu'l-Adhkár.

Her funeral was a large occasion, similar to the funeral of ʻAbdu'l-Bahá, with eulogies, prayers and poems recited by all different religions and races. A memorial luncheon was held in her honour in August 1932 in which food was given to the poor and needy in her memory.

== Remembrances ==
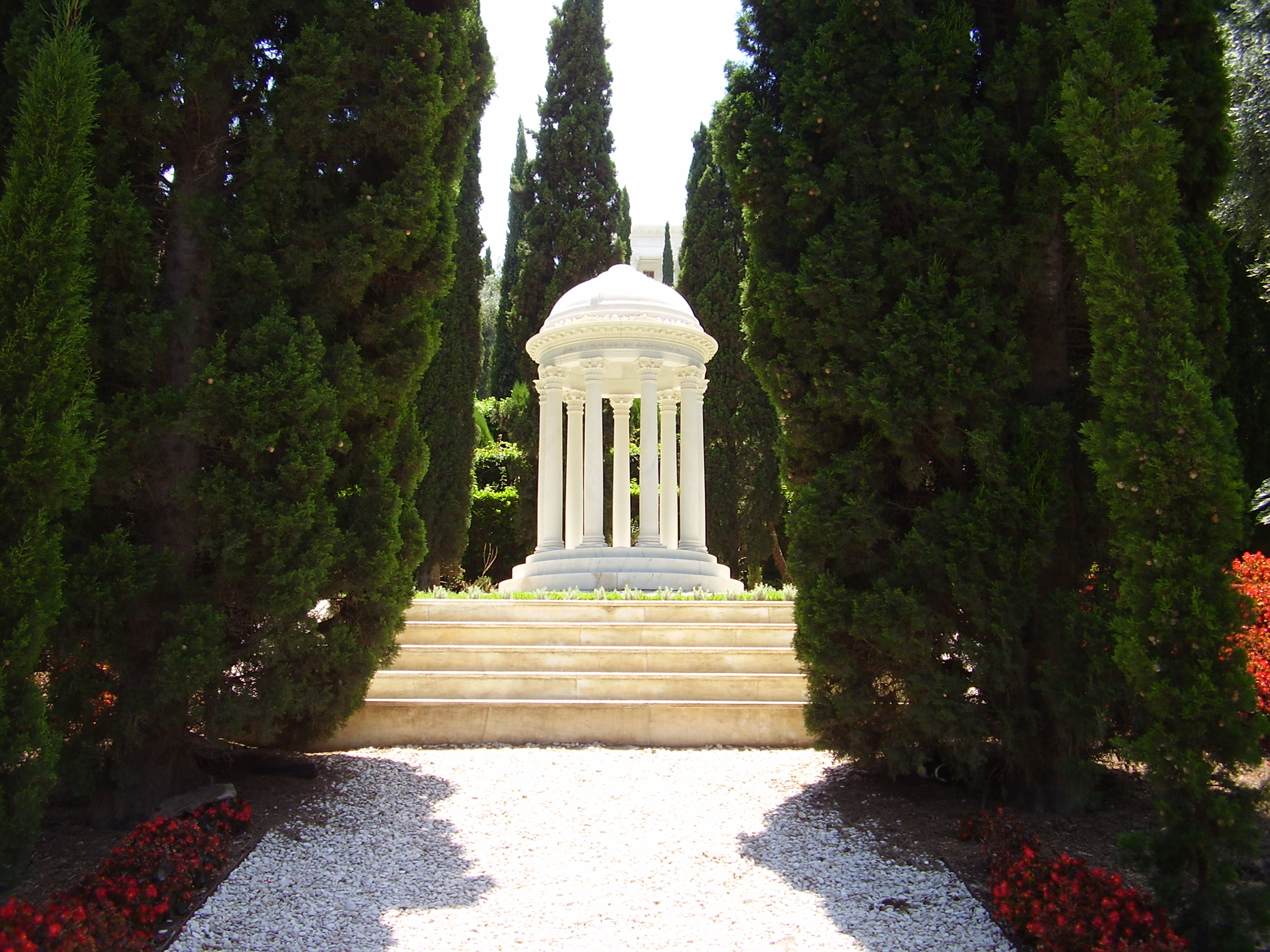
The grave of Bahíyyih Khánum within the Monument Gardens.

After her death, Shoghi Effendi composed a 16-page handwritten eulogy for Bahiyyih Khánum. Nine days of prayer vigils were asked of Baháʼís living in the Holy Land at her temporary grave site. Munírih mourned "you have melted us in the furnace of separation and remoteness". Nine months of official mourning were declared for Baháʼís to honour her memory, while personal celebrations were asked to be withheld for a full year.

The first step taken by Shoghi Effendi in creating the administrative Centre of the Baháʼí Faith was the acquisition of land on Mount Carmel in close proximity to the Shrine of the Báb, and the interment of the remains of Bahíyyih Khánum were placed under the Monument of the Greatest Holy Leaf, followed by the transfer of the remains of Mirza Mihdi and Navváb in December 1939. This location is now in the Baháʼí gardens downhill from the Baháʼí Arc on Mount Carmel at the Baháʼí World Centre. Shoghi Effendi had finished the translation of Nabil's Narrative: The Dawn-breakers in 1932 and dedicated it to her. Bahíyyih Khánum had devoted much of her life towards protecting the accepted leadership of the Baháʼí Faith and after Shoghi Effendi's appointment there was little internal opposition until after her death when nephews began to openly oppose Shoghi Effendi over Baháʼu'lláh's house in Baghdad.

=== Death anniversary ===
A worldwide commemoration was held for her in 1982, and was marked with the publication of a compilation of references to her from the heads of the Baháʼí Faith, and excerpts from 92 of her letters. In July 1982, during the first-ever gathering held in the permanent Seat of the Universal House of Justice, a seminar on her life was held. The architect confirmed that he had deliberately designed the dome of the Seat to evoke the dome on her monument. This commemoration was framed by five international conferences held in her honour — Dublin, Ireland 25–27 June, Quito, Ecuador 6–8 August, Lagos, Nigeria 19–22 August, Canberra, Australia 2–5 September, and Montreal, Quebec, Canada 2–5 September 1982. The children's book Stories of the Greatest Holy Leaf, adapted by Jacqueline Mehrabi, contains anecdotes about the life of Bahiyyih Khánum.

== Appearance and personality ==
By the time she was in her teens, Bahíyyih notably resembled her mother who was a famous beauty. Bahíyyih was described as having large grey eyes, a slender figure, golden-brown hair and ivory coloured skin "very much like her lovely mother." Her carriage was graceful and aristocratic. Ella Goodall Cooper, an early American Bahá’í, described her as "tall, slender and of noble bearing" and her face as the "feminine counterpart of ʻAbdu'l-Bahá's" with "understanding eyes". The privations and imprisonment took its toll on Bahíyyih's health and she grew frail and frequently suffered from bouts of ill-health. Margaret Randall, an American Bahá’í pilgrim, writes in 1919: "her face looked dreadfully tired but her eyes were like the Master's, so alive and expressive."

Bahíyyih had a fondness for flowers and children. She paid great attention to cleanliness and how well-lit a room was. Her published letters show her encouraging women to involve themselves in Bahá’í service. Though she was often described as quiet, self-effacing and refined, according to Bahá’ís she proved herself a decisive and effective leader when heading the religion in the 1910s and 1920s.

Bahíyyih held a special place in the heart of Bahá’u’lláh, who not only supported her choice to remain single but also declined any marriage proposals on her behalf. He expressed, "I know no man worthy to marry such purity as my daughter." Whenever Bahíyyih visited Bahá’u’lláh in the Mansion of Bahjí, he would eagerly stand on his balcony, awaiting the first glimpse of her arrival. In the later years of her life, when a group of students made a pilgrimage to visit her, Bahíyyih requested them to perform traditional Persian folk songs. This evoked strong emotions in her as she listened to songs reminiscent of her childhood in Tehran with Bahá’u’lláh. Her father affectionately referred to her as Bahíyyih or Bahá’íyyih, the feminine derivative of his own name. Amongst the family she was known as “Khánum” (the lady).

According to Bahá’ís, Bahíyyih was said to have an inner strength, because she had entered imprisonment as an inexperienced girl with little formal education but overcame the difficulties of her life. Biographer Janet Khan described Bahíyyih as a model of resilience in the face of personal tragedy and suffering. She is regarded as the foremost woman of the religion, an example for both sexes and the “Liege lady” of the Bahá’ís.

== See also ==
Others buried in the Monument Gardens:

- Mirzá Mihdí — Baháʼu'lláh's youngest son from his first wife
- Ásiyih Khánum — Baháʼu'lláh's first wife
- Munírih — ʻAbdu'l-Bahá's wife

The Baháʼí Holy Family:

- Baháʼu'lláh — Bahíyyih Khánum's Father and Founder of Baháʼí Faith
- ʻAbdu'l-Bahá — eldest son of Ásíyih and Baháʼu'lláh, head of the Baháʼí Faith from 1892 to his death in 1921
- Shoghi Effendi — grandson of ʻAbdu'l-Baha, great-grandson of Ásíyih and Baháʼu'lláh, the Guardian, or head, of the religion from 1921 to his death in 1957
- Rúhíyyih Khánum — the wife of Shoghi Effendi
- Khadíjih-Bagum — the wife of the Báb
