= Janet Khan =

Researcher, author and member of the Australian Baha'i Community

- Born: Janet Adrienne Griffith; October 25, 1940 (age 85); Sydney, NSW
- Occupation: Baháʼí author

Janet Khan née Griffith (born October 25, 1940) is an Australian author who has published on the history and teachings of the Bahá’í Faith and the correlation of Bahá’í thought with contemporary social issues. Khan completed a doctorate in counselling at the University of Michigan and worked as an academic at the University of Michigan and the University of Queensland in Brisbane, Australia. From 1977 to 1984 Khan served as a member of the National Spiritual Assembly of the Bahá’í Faith in Australia and as its Chair for several years. Khan served in the Research Department in the Holy Land, Haifa, Israel from 1983 to 2000 and was also a member of the International Advisory Board for the Bahá’í Chair for World Peace at the University of Maryland.

== Early life and education ==
Janet Adrienne Khan was born in 1940. She completed a PhD in Education (Counselling) at the University of Michigan in Ann Arbor, Michigan in 1970, and worked as a counsellor and program specialist at the university’s Center for the Continuing Education of Women from 1970 to 1976.

Khan is the author or co-author of several books on the history and teachings of the Bahá’í Faith. She served in the Research Department in the Holy Land, Haifa, Israel from 1983 to 2010 and her research interests include gender issues, the role of women in religion, aspects of social change, and the evolution of the Baha'i system of administration.

== Career ==
Khan has served in various roles for the Australian and International Bahá'í Community over many years. In 1966, Khan married fellow-Australian, Peter Khan (1936-2011), a well-known Bahá’í and Fulbright Scholar and academic at the University of Michigan. He served as a member of the National Spiritual Assembly of the Bahá’ís of Australia from 1958 to 1963; and was elected to the Universal House of Justice in Haifa, Israel; serving there from 1987 to 2010. During his stay in the United States, Dr Peter Khan served as a member of the Auxiliary Board for Propagation of the Baha'i Faith. While residing and working in the United States from 1966 to 1976, Khan and her husband travelled widely visiting Bahá’í communities in North and Central America, and participated in Bahá’í Summer Schools and Conferences. As a couple Khan and her husband developed esteemed reputations within the American Bahá'í community for serving the Bahá'í Faith as informed teachers and speakers. Both Peter and Janet Khan led courses at the Northwest Bahá'í Summer School in Seabeck, Washington in June–July 1970 and at Bahá'í conferences including at Michigan State University, East Lansing, Michigan in January 1971 at the Green Lake Institute, Wisconsin in October 1975 and at Green Bay, Wisconsin in December 1975. Khan was also a member of the U.S. International Goals Committee.

In 1976, the couple announced that they were returning to Australia, to take up academic positions at the University of Queensland, Brisbane. Janet Khan held the position of assistant professor of psychology at the university. From 1977 to 1983, Khan was a member of the National Spiritual Assembly of the Bahá’ís of Australia. She served as the Chair from 1982 to 1983. She spoke and conducted workshops at the Bahá'í National Youth Conference in Hobart, Tasmania in January 1978. In February 1979, the Khan and Dr Peter Khan visited the United States, and spoke of their service to the Bahá'í Faith in Australia. In August 1979, Khan was the keynote speaker at the Bahá'í Women’s Conference in Melbourne, Victoria, in August 1979. While on sabbatical leave, in her role as Vice-Chair of the National Spiritual Assembly of the Bahá'ís of Australia, and in service to the National Spiritual Assembly of the Bahá'ís of the United States, Khan travelled to the United States where she was a featured speaker at a Bahá'í Youth Conference in Coeur d’Alene, Idaho in June 1980 and visited Bahá'í communities in Idaho, Oregon, Washington and northern California in June and July 1980. In her role as Chair of the National Spiritual Assembly of the Bahá'ís of Australia, Khan spoke at the Bahá'í International Conference in Canberra, ACT in September 1982.

From 1983 to 2010, Khan served in the Research Department at the Bahá'í World Center in Haifa, Israel. Khan’s work involved researching the teachings and history of the Bahá’í Faith and studying the correlation of Bahá’í thought with contemporary social issues. In April 2009, Khan and her husband Dr Peter Khan visited Sydney, Australia and were keynote speakers for the 75th anniversary celebrations of the formation of the National Spiritual Assembly of the Bahá'ís of Australia.

In 2010, Khan and her husband returned to Australia from Israel. Khan has continued to actively serve the Bahá’í Faith in Australia as an author and public speaker after her husband died in July 2011.

In June 2015, Khan attended a multi-faith gathering with the Dalai Lama in Brisbane, Australia, where she read a prayer by ‘Abdu’l-Baha, head of the Bahá'í Faith from 1892 to 1921. Khan is also a member of the International Advisory Board for the University of Maryland's Bahá’í Chair for World Peace.

== Selected publications ==
=== Books ===
- Mahmoudi, Hoda and Khan, Janet A. (2020), A World without War: Abdu’l-Bahá and the Discourse for Global Peace. Wilmette, Illinois, USA: Bahá?í Publishing Trust. ISBN 9781618511645
- Khan, Janet A. (2016). Call to Apostleship, Reflections on the Tablets of the Divine Plan. Wilmette, Illinois, USA: Bahá?í Publishing Trust. ISBN 9781618511102
- Khan, Janet A. (2009). Heritage of Light, The Spiritual Destiny of America. Wilmette, Illinois, USA: Bahá?í Publishing Trust. ISBN 9781931847735
- Khan, Janet A. (2005). Prophet’s Daughter, The Life and Legacy of Bahíyyih Khánum, Outstanding Heroine of the Bahá’í Faith. Wilmette, Illinois, USA: Bahá?í Publishing Trust. ISBN 9781931847148
- Khan, Janet A. & Khan, Peter (1998). Advancement of Women, A Bahá’í Perspective. Wilmette, Illinois, USA: Bahá?í Publishing Trust. ISBN 9781931847032

=== Book chapters ===
- Khan, Janet A. (2001). "Women, Social Action, and the Common Good". In Azza Karam (ed.). A Woman’s Place, Religious Women as Public Actors. New York City, New York, USA: World Conference on Religion and Peace. ISBN 9780935934106
- Khan, Janet A. (1996). "Creating an Evolutionary Image of New Systems of Learning and Human Development" pp. 195–206. In W.W. Gasparski et al. (eds.) Social Agency, Dilemmas and Education Praxiology: The International Annual of Practical Philosophy and Methodology, Volume 4. New Brunswick, USA: Transaction Publishers. ISBN 9781560002406
- Hanson, Holly and Khan, Janet A. (1996). "Design of Evolutionary Education Systems by Indigenous Peoples: Three Case Studies in the Baha’i Community" pp. 251–262. In W.W. Gasparski et al. (eds.) Social Agency, Dilemmas and Education Praxiology: The International Annual of Practical Philosophy and Methodology, Volume 4. New Brunswick, USA: Transaction Publishers.
- Khan, Janet A. (1995). "Religions as an Agent for Promoting the Advance of Women at all Levels". Introduction to The Greatness Which Might Be Theirs: Protection of Women’s Rights. Reflection on the Agenda and Platform for the United Nations Fourth World Conference on Women: Equality, Development and Peace, In Beijing, China. New York City, New York, USA: Bahá’í International Community.

=== Journal articles ===
- Khan, Janet A. (2022) "Reflections on the Centenary of the Ascension of 'Abdu'l-Bahá". The Australian Bahá’í, February 2022. pp 1–4.
- Mahmoudi, Hoda and Khan, Janet A. (2021). "'Abdu'l-Bahá: Champion of Universal Peace" (2021)". The Bahá’í World Online Special Collection.
- Khan, Janet A. (2007). "Rank and Station: Reflections on the Life of Bahíyyih Khánum". Journal of Bahá'í Studies, No. 17:1-4. pp. 1–26.
- Khan, Janet A. (2006). "Louise Dixon Boyle and Maria Montessori". Journal of Bahá'í Studies, No. 16:1-4. pp. 61–87.
- Khan, Janet A. (2000). "Promoting the Equality of Women and Men: The Role of the Covenant". Journal of Bahá'í Studies, No. 10:1-2. pp 71–90.
