= Robert Turner (Bahá'í) =

African American Bahá’í (1855/56–1909)

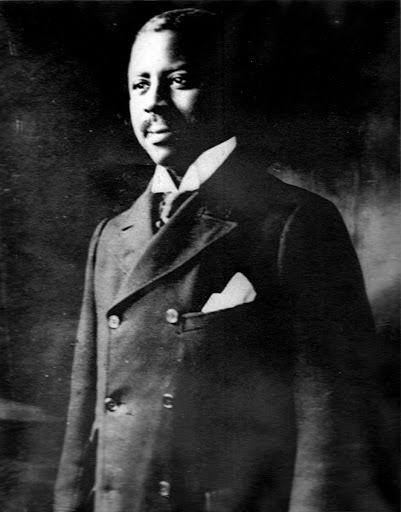
- Robert Turner, c. 1900
- Born: October 15, 1855/56; Norfolk, Virginia, US
- Died: 15 Jun 1909 (age 53–54); San Francisco, California, US
- Occupation: Butler
- Title: Disciple of ʻAbdu'l-Bahá

Robert Chaittle Turner (c. October 15, 1855/56 – June 15, 1909) was the first African American Bahá’í and one of the nineteen Disciples of ʻAbdu'l-Bahá.

== Life ==
Robert Turner was born on a farm outside of Norfolk, Virginia in the mid-1850s. As a teenager, Turner moved to California and worked for the Palace Hotel.

In 1881, Turner went to work for George Hearst. Turner's employment with the Hearst family spanned thirty-five years, beginning in the 1870s as George Hearst's valet, followed by his roles as steward and butler. In 1891, Turner and his wife, Melissa Turner, attended the funeral of George Hearst in Washington, D.C. at the invitation of Phoebe Hearst.

Turner first heard of the Bahá’í Faith from early American Bahá’í Lua Getsinger when she visited Phoebe Hearst in California in 1898. Turner listened to Lua while serving tea and remained to hear the talk she gave. Both Hearst and Turner became Bahá’ís in the summer of 1898.

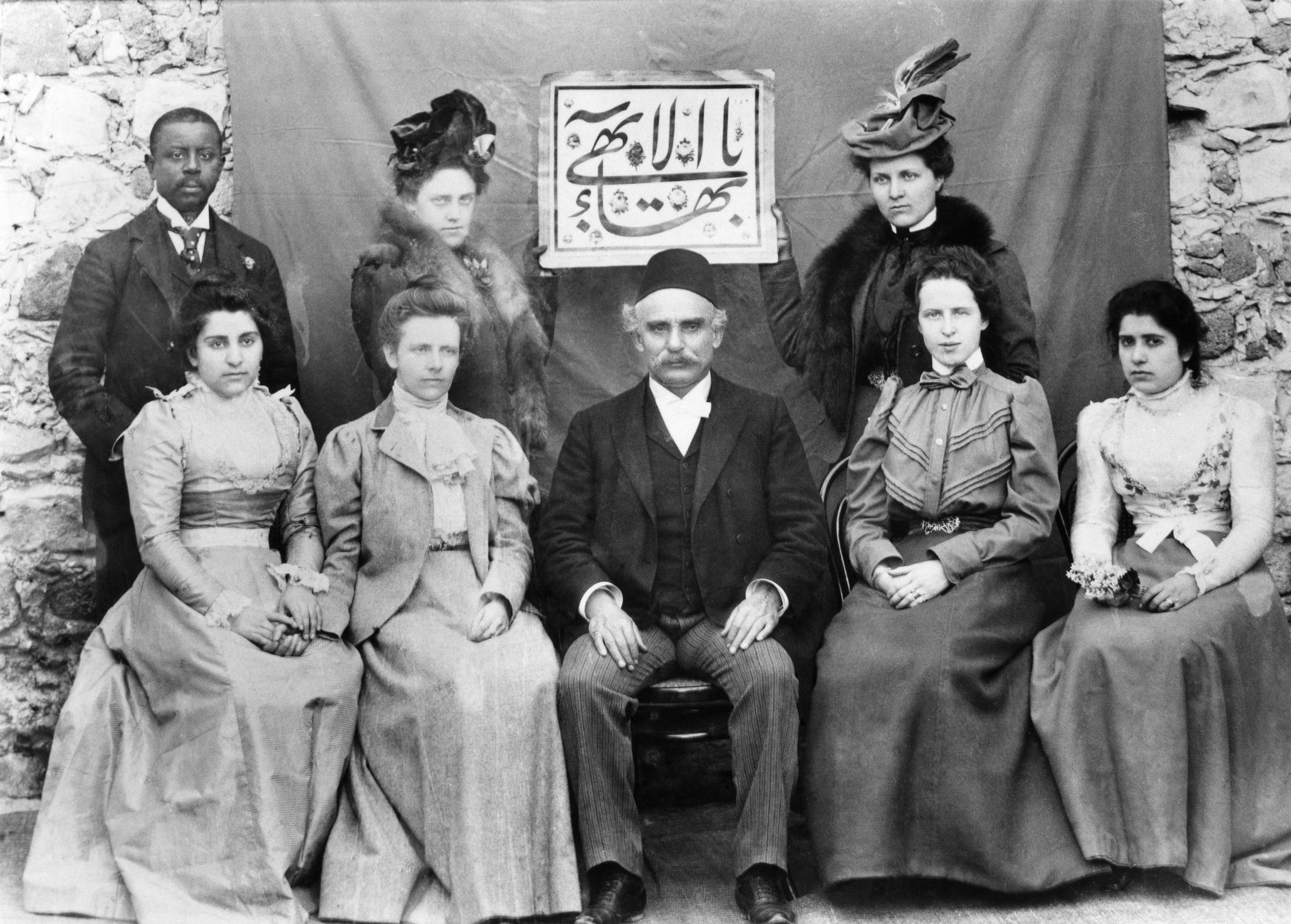
First Western Bahá’í Pilgrims

Later that same year, Hearst funded the first Western Bahá’í pilgrimage group, which consisted of fifteen Bahá’ís, including herself and Robert Turner, traveling to the Middle East to visit ʻAbdu'l-Bahá, the son and successor of Bahá’u’lláh, the prophet and founder of the Faith. The pilgrims left the United States on September 22 and arrived in ‘Akká, Palestine on December 10, 1898.

Since ‘Abdu’l-Bahá was still a prisoner of the Ottoman Government at the time, the pilgrim group could only visit him in three smaller groups. Turner was able to meet with ‘Abdu’l-Bahá on December 10, 1898 in the House of ʻAbdu'lláh Páshá. Feeling unworthy of such meeting, Turner initially waited outside the designated room yet he soon found himself in the welcoming embrace of ‘Abdu’l-Bahá, who had left the room to meet with Turner. He would have the chance to meet with ‘Abdu’l-Bahá again on February 17, 1899 before departing for home.

== Death ==
In the spring of 1909, Turner fell ill with Bright’s disease and became bedridden. Ali Kuli Khan, a Persian Bahá’í who served as a secretary for ‘Abdu’l-Bahá, visited Turner and described his condition to ‘Abdu’l-Bahá. In response, ‘Abdu’l-Bahá wrote the following:

Convey wondrous Abhá greetings to Mr Robert, the servant of that honorable lady, and say to him: 'Be not grieved at your illness, for thou hast attained eternal life and hast found thy way to the World of the Kingdom. God willing, we shall meet one another with joy and fragrance in that Divine World, and I beg of God that you may also find rest in this material world.'

According to Louis George Gregory, as Turner's illness worsened and he became delirious, relatives reported that Turner recited the Greatest Name. While a number of early Western Bahá’ís either left the Faith or broke the Covenant, Turner, instead, "refused to let the world throw dust in his eyes" and remained a Bahá’í throughout the final years of his life. After Turner's death, Ali Kuli Khan donated a Bahá’í burial ring, and placed it on Turner's finger before his burial.

‘Abdu’l-Bahá wrote this tribute in Robert Turner's honor after his death:

As to Mr Robert (Turner), the news of his ascension saddened the hearts. He was in reality in the utmost sincerity. Glory be to God! What a shining candle was aflame in that black-colored lamp. Praise be to God that that lighted candle ascended from the earthly lamp to the Kingdom of Eternity and gleamed and became aflame in the Heavenly Assemblage. Praise be to God that you adorned his blessed finger with the ring bearing the inscription: 'Verily I originated from God and returned unto Him' ... This too is a proof of his sincerity and that in his last breath, he breathed the Alláh-u-Abhá, whereby the hearts of those present were impressed.

Shoghi Effendi, the Guardian of the Baha'i Faith and its leader after ‘Abdu’l-Baha's death, named Robert Turner as one of the nineteen Disciples of ‘Abdu’l-Bahá, an honor in the Bahá’í tradition of the Báb’s nineteen Letters of the Living and Baha’u’llah's nineteen Apostles.
