= Promised Day is Come =

Promised Day is Come is a book-length letter written by the head of the Baháʼí Faith in the first half of the 20th century, Shoghi Effendi. It was dated 28 March 1941, and was written for the Baháʼís of the West.

Shoghi Effendi talks of the coming of The Most Great Peace and the rejection of the letters to the rulers of the world by Baháʼu'lláh.

== See also ==
- Summons of the Lord of Hosts
