= Ásíyih Khánum =

Wife of Baháʼu'lláh, the founder of the Baháʼí Faith

Ásíyih K͟hánum
- آسیه خانم
- Born: Ásíyih Yalrúdí; 1820; Yal Rud, Mazandaran, Qajar Iran
- Died: 1886 (aged 65–66); Acre, Syria Vilayet, Ottoman Empire
- Spouse: Baháʼu'lláh (m. 1835)
- Children: ʻAbdu'l-Bahá; Bahíyyih Khánum; Mírzá Mihdí
- Father: Mírzá Ismáʼíl Yalrúdí

Ásíyih K͟hánum (Persian: آسیه خانم; 1820 – 1886) was the first wife of Baháʼu'lláh, the founder of the Baháʼí Faith. She is also known by her titles of Navváb, Búyúk K͟hánum or Hadrat-i-K͟hánum. K͟hánum is a title usually given to a Persian lady and is equivalent to madam or dame. Baháʼu'lláh and Ásíyih Khánum were known as the Father of the Poor and the Mother of Consolation for their extraordinary generosity and regard for the impoverished. Baháʼu'lláh, along with Ásíyih Khánum and her children, are regarded as the Baháʼí holy family.

== Background ==
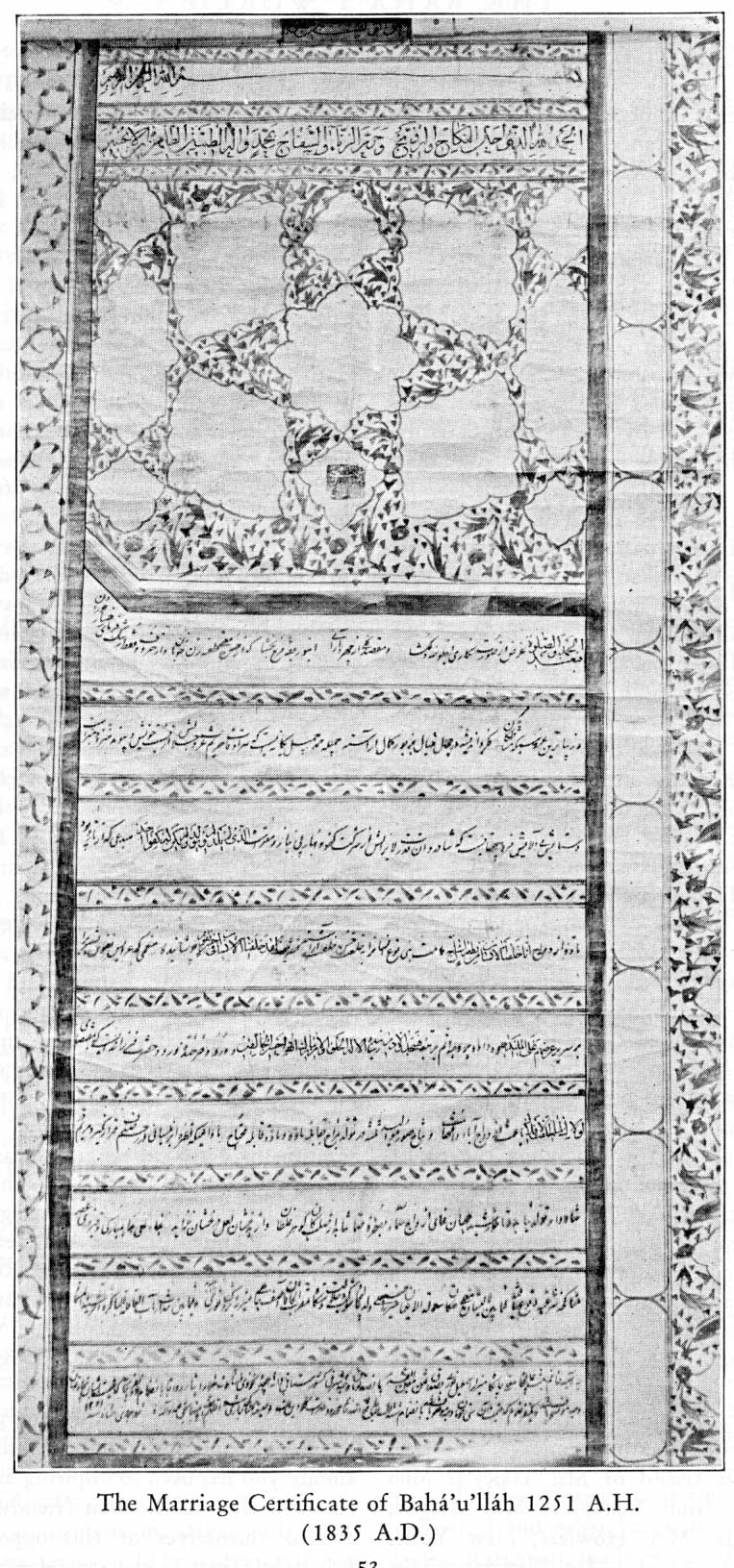
Wedding certificate of Baháʼu'lláh and Ásíyih K͟hánum (1835).

Ásíyih Khánum was born Ásíyih Yalrúdí, the only daughter of Mírzá Ismáʼíl Yalrúdí, an aristocrat and minister in the Qajar court in the village of Yal Rud in Mazandaran. She had one brother Mírzá Mahmúd who did not become a follower of Bábism nor of the Baháʼí Faith. The Yalrúdí family held a prominent position in the nobility, providing Ásíyih with an upbringing of exceptional privilege. She received a comprehensive education and was proficient in both Persian and Arabic.

== Marriage ==
In 1832, Ásíyih's elder brother, Mírzá Mahmúd, entered into marriage with Sarah, an elder sister of Baháʼu'lláh. Sarah was very close to Baháʼu'lláh and was gratified with evidence of young Ásíyih’s beauty, piety and kindness. She quickly devised a plan to marry the two together. Mírzá ʻAbbás Núrí agreed, possibly enticed by a substantial dowry that included three servants, a sizable piece of land, property, and a sum of money. Although the engagement was officially announced, it was postponed until Ásíyih reached marriageable age.

In October 1835, the fifteen-year-old Ásíyih Khánum married Baháʼu'lláh in a lavish ceremony where the buttons on Ásíyih Khánum's attire were jewels. These jewels were later sold to sustain the family with food during the persecution of Bábís in 1852. According to Baháʼí sources, Ásíyih and Baháʼu'lláh were actively involved in philanthropy. Known as the “Mother of Consolation,” Ásíyih engaged in charitable work, particularly aiding the destitute in Tehran.

The marriage resulted in seven children: Kázim, Sádiq, ʻAbbás, ʻAlí-Muhammad, Bahíyyih, Mihdí, and ʻAlí-Muhammad. Only three survived to adulthood, all of whom maintained a strong loyalty to their mother. Ásíyih Khánum was intimately connected with her children, actively participating in their upbringing, especially that of ʻAbdu'l-Bahá. The Núrí family resided in the capital, Tehran, and spent the summer months in Mazandaran; the customary practice of upper-class Persian families.

== As a Bábí ==
In 1844, Baháʼu'lláh heard of a new faith Bábism and accepted. Ásíyih soon joined the new faith and became a fervent convert. She helped hide the Bábí leader Táhirih in her private parlour whilst she was hiding from government forces.

On 15 August 1852, a radical Bábí group attempted to assassinate the Shah, but their plan failed. The Bábís associated with the plot were apprehended and executed. Despite their assertion that they acted independently, the entire Bábí community bore the blame, triggering a widespread pogrom initiated by the Shah. Bahá’u’lláh was arrested. Ásíyih’s residence was ransacked, its belongings seized, leaving her in dire poverty. She fled with her children, grappling at times to secure enough funds for their sustenance. The family vividly recalled receiving only a handful of flour to alleviate their hunger.

== Baghdad ==
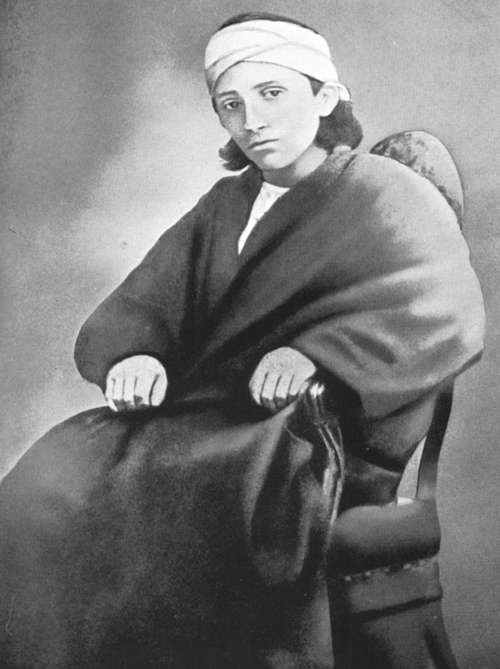
Mirzá Mihdí, the youngest child of Ásíyih.

Bahá’u’lláh was eventually released but banished from his homeland to Baghdad. Despite their well-established connections through their families, many distanced themselves from the couple during this period. Upon departure, no one bid them farewell, except the "grandmother of Ásíyih Khánum". Reluctantly, Ásíyih left her youngest child, Mihdí, in her care.

In the freezing winter of January 1853, the family embarked on their journey to Baghdad. Accompanying Baháʼu'lláh, who was weak and ailing from his months in the dungeon, Ásíyih Khánum became his closest companion and confidante. Additionally, she was pregnant during the journey, which posed considerable challenges.

In 1854, Baháʼu'lláh decided to retreat to Kurdistan, entrusting the care of the family to his two brothers, Mírzá Músá and Subh-i-Azal. According to her children’s recollections, Azal restricted the family’s freedom, forbidding Ásíyih from seeking medical help when her baby needed a doctor. The child, named ʻAlí-Muhammad after the Báb, was born in Baghdad and died around 1855 at the age of two. Bahá’u’lláh eventually returned, bringing some stability to the family.

== Constantinople and Adrianople ==
The family were subsequently exiled again to Constantinople in 1863. Shortly after the arrival in Constantinople they were exiled to the remote Adrianople. The journey was an exhausting and wearisome one during the winter. The cold took its toll on Ásíyih and she fell gravely ill. The five years in Adrianople were also unhappy. Bahá’u’lláh almost died in 1866 and she was threatened with being separated from her husband in 1868. It was, according to Baháʼís, through the intercession of ʻAbdu'l-Bahá that this was scrapped and the family all exiled together.

== Acre ==
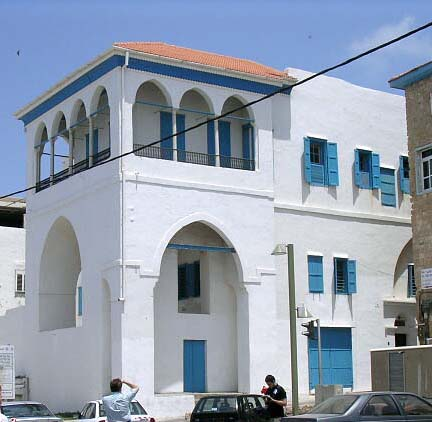
House of ʻAbbúd.

In July 1868, a royal decree was issued, condemning the Bábís/Baháʼís to perpetual imprisonment and isolation in remote outposts of the Ottoman Empire. Mirza Yahya and his followers were assigned to Famagusta, Cyprus, while Baháʼu'lláh and his followers were designated to Acre in Ottoman Palestine. Once again, and for the final time, the family was exiled to the prison city of Acre, Israel, which proved to be the most challenging place they had experienced thus far. Accompanying Ásíyih were her twenty-four-year-old son, her twenty-one-year-old daughter, her twenty-year-old son, and her husband.

The Baháʼís arrived in August at the peak of summer. The inhabitants of Acre were informed that the new prisoners were deemed enemies of the state, God, and His religion, and any association with them was strictly prohibited. The hostile public engaged in jeering and verbal abuse. Nearly all of the exiles fell dangerously ill. This period proved distressing for Ásíyih Khánum, as well as for many other Baháʼís, given the death of three Baháʼís and the antagonistic behavior of the surrounding population. The Baháʼís were imprisoned in appalling conditions within a cluster of cells covered in dirt and sewage, without adequate food for three days. Perhaps the most trying circumstance for Ásíyih was the sudden and accidental death of her youngest son, twenty-two-year-old Mihdí.

The death of her son caused Ásíyih much pain, to the extent that her family grew concerned about her sanity. According to Baháʼís, the disconsolate Ásíyih found solace in Baháʼu'lláh, who reassured his wife that their child was in heaven.

== Easing of restrictions ==
In 1870, the family's restrictions were eased, and they were relocated from the prison. As the people of Acre began to show respect for the Baháʼís, particularly ʻAbdu'l-Bahá, he arranged for houses to be rented for the family. Around 1879, when an epidemic prompted the inhabitants to flee, the family moved to the Mansion of Bahjí. Despite her delicate health, exacerbated by the climate of Acre, Ásíyih continued her nursing work, a vocation she had initiated in Tehran. Remembered in the city for assisting the sick and developing remedies, she maintained this commitment

As pilgrims gradually arrived from Persia, Ásíyih greeted them as the "head of the household," earning great respect and admiration from both Baháʼís and her own children. Baháʼu'lláh affectionately called her “Navváb”, and also gave her the names Varaqiyih-'Ulyá, meaning "Most Exalted Leaf," and his "perpetual consort in the worlds of God". (Note: Baháʼu'lláh referred to his family as a tree, and the females the leaves) Baháʼu'lláh designated her son ʻAbdu'l-Bahá as his successor.

== Death ==
Ásíyih died in 1886 at the age of 66, having suffered a fall, with Baháʼu'lláh by her side. Her death was a cause for mourning not only within the Baháʼí community but also among the broader populace of Acre.; her funeral was attended by Muslims, Christians and Druze people. Baháʼu'lláh expressed his profound grief, stating that after Ásíyih, his light had turned to darkness, his joy to sadness, and calmness into agitation. Her death was followed by additional losses that deeply affected the family. A year later, Mírzá Músá, Baháʼu'lláh's brother, died, followed by the death of ʻAbdu'l-Bahá's son and Baháʼu'lláh's grandson, five-year-old Husayn. These subsequent losses intensified Baháʼu'lláh's mourning.

== Reburial ==
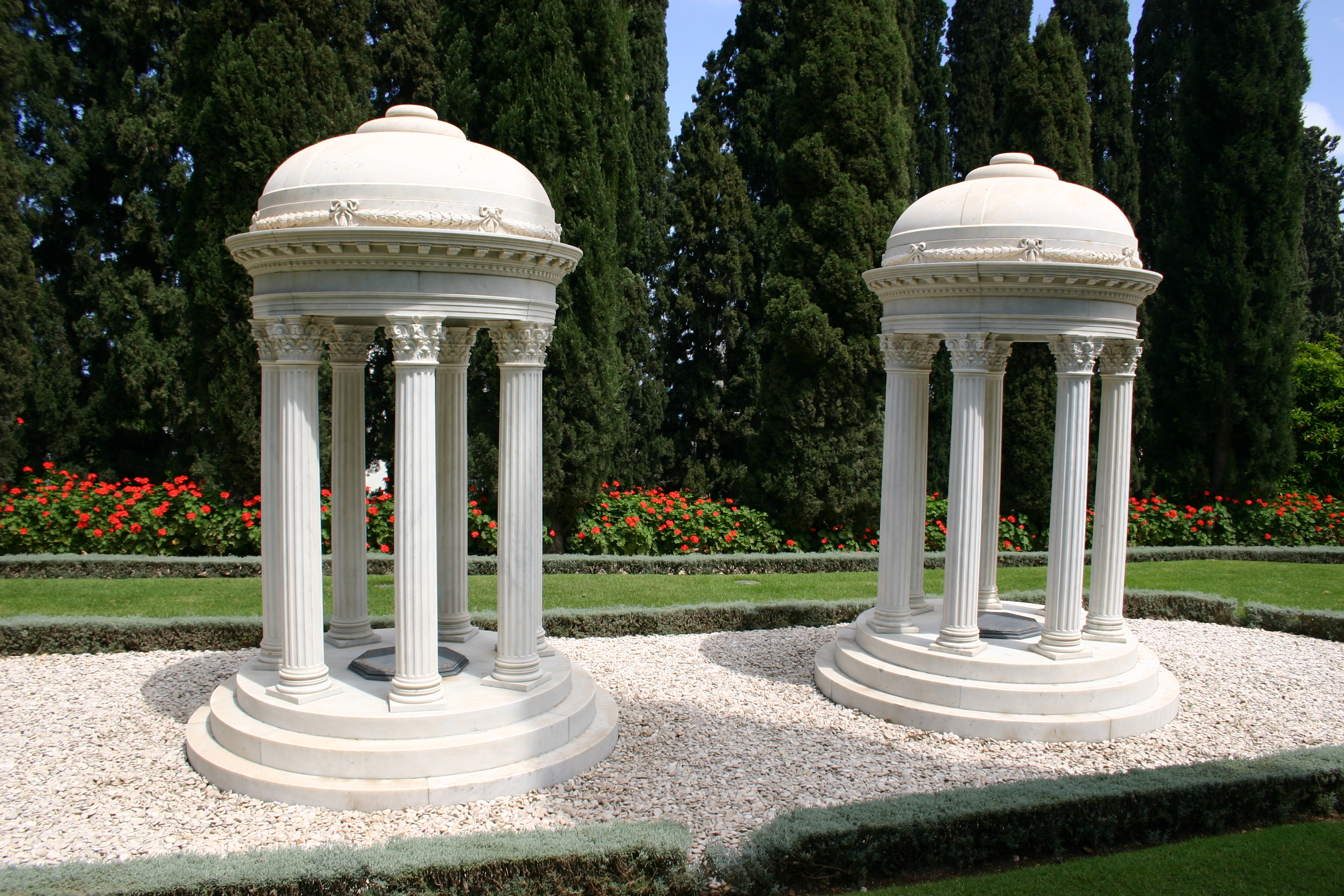
Monument Gardens, facing north. The tomb of Ásíyih is on the left; of Mihdí on the right.

After Ásíyih died in 1886, she was buried in a Muslim cemetery in Acre. Western and Eastern pilgrims would travel to the cemetery to visit her grave and the grave of Mírzá Mihdí. In 1932 her daughter died and her wish was to be buried beside her mother and brother. Shoghi Effendi thought the gravesite of Ásíyih in this cemetery was unbefitting for her and her son.

After fifty-three years since her death, he arranged to secretly transfer her remains and that of her son to be buried near her daughter in Mount Carmel. They were removed from their previous resting places and the bodies were temporarily left in the Shrine of the Báb till the burial arrangements were finished. He then cabled the Baháʼís:

Blessed remains Purest Branch and Master's mother safely transferred hallowed precincts Shrines Mount Carmel. Long inflicted humiliation wiped away. Machinations Covenant-breakers frustrate plan defeated. Cherished wish Greatest Holy Leaf fulfilled. Sister brother mother wife ʻAbdu'l-Bahá reunited one spot designed constitute focal centre Baháʼí Administrative Institutions at Faith's World Centre. Share joyful news entire body American believers. Shoghi Rabbani.

He commissioned two marble monuments to be built made in Corinthian style from Italy. After successfully transferring the remains, Shoghi Effendi reburied the two next to each other in a ceremony on Christmas Day of 1939. The burial ground is now called the Monument Gardens, the burial ground of the Baháʼí "holy family", namely the wife, son, daughter and daughter-in-law of Baháʼu'lláh.

== Appearance and personality ==
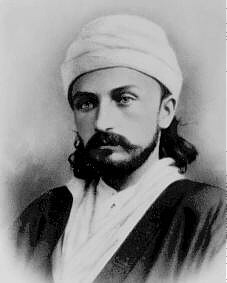
ʻAbbás Effendi, Ásíyih Khánum's eldest son.

Tall by the standards of nineteenth-century Persia, Ásíyih possessed a fair complexion, dark hair, deep blue eyes, and regular features, making her a recognized beauty. Described by her daughter as a "pearl amongst women", historical accounts depict her as "slender, stately, with white skin and blue eyes and dark hair". She was further characterized as "winsome, vivacious, and exceedingly beautiful". All her children inherited her distinctive physical features.

Ásíyih had an aristocratic bearing, yet at times, she grappled with the challenges of life in exile. Unaccustomed to labor, she faced difficulties during the exile in Baghdad, with her hands suffering from blisters and cuts caused by washing clothes. Remembered for her strong character, her son `Abdu’l-Bahá reflected that she was "patient, God-fearing, calm, humble, and contented." Shoghi Effendi described her as having "continued to evince a fortitude, a piety, a devotion, and a nobility of soul".

Ásíyih was profoundly religious. Following the unexpected death of her son Mírzá Mihdí, she found solace in her deeply rooted belief that he was in heaven. Her granddaughter fondly remembered her, stating, "my eyes will always see her in her blue dress…her sweet, smiling face…as she chanted prayers in her musical voice". Even in her youth in Tehran, Ásíyih was recognised for her charitable work with the poor, and this commitment continued during her imprisonment in Acre. When the exiled Bahá’í community experienced a period of relative freedom, Ásíyih actively participated in caring for the sick in Acre.

== See also ==
- Baháʼu'lláh's family

Others buried in the Monument Gardens:

- Mirzá Mihdí, Baháʼu'lláh's youngest son by Ásíyih to survive infancy.
- Bahíyyih Khánum, Baháʼu'lláh's daughter by Ásíyih.
- Munirih Khánum, daughter-in-law by Ásíyih and wife of ʻAbdu'l-Bahá, Ásíyih's eldest son.

Baháʼí Holy Family:

- ʻAbdu'l-Bahá, eldest son of Ásíyih and Baháʼu'lláh.
- Shoghi Effendi, grandson of ʻAbdu'l-Bahá, great-grandson of Ásíyih and Baháʼu'lláh, and the Guardian, or head, of the Baháʼí Faith.
- Rúhíyyih Khánum, wife of Shoghi Effendi.
- Khadíjih-Bagum, wife of The Báb.
