= Munírih Khánum =

Wife of ʻAbdu'l-Bahá, prominent figure in the Baháʼí Faith

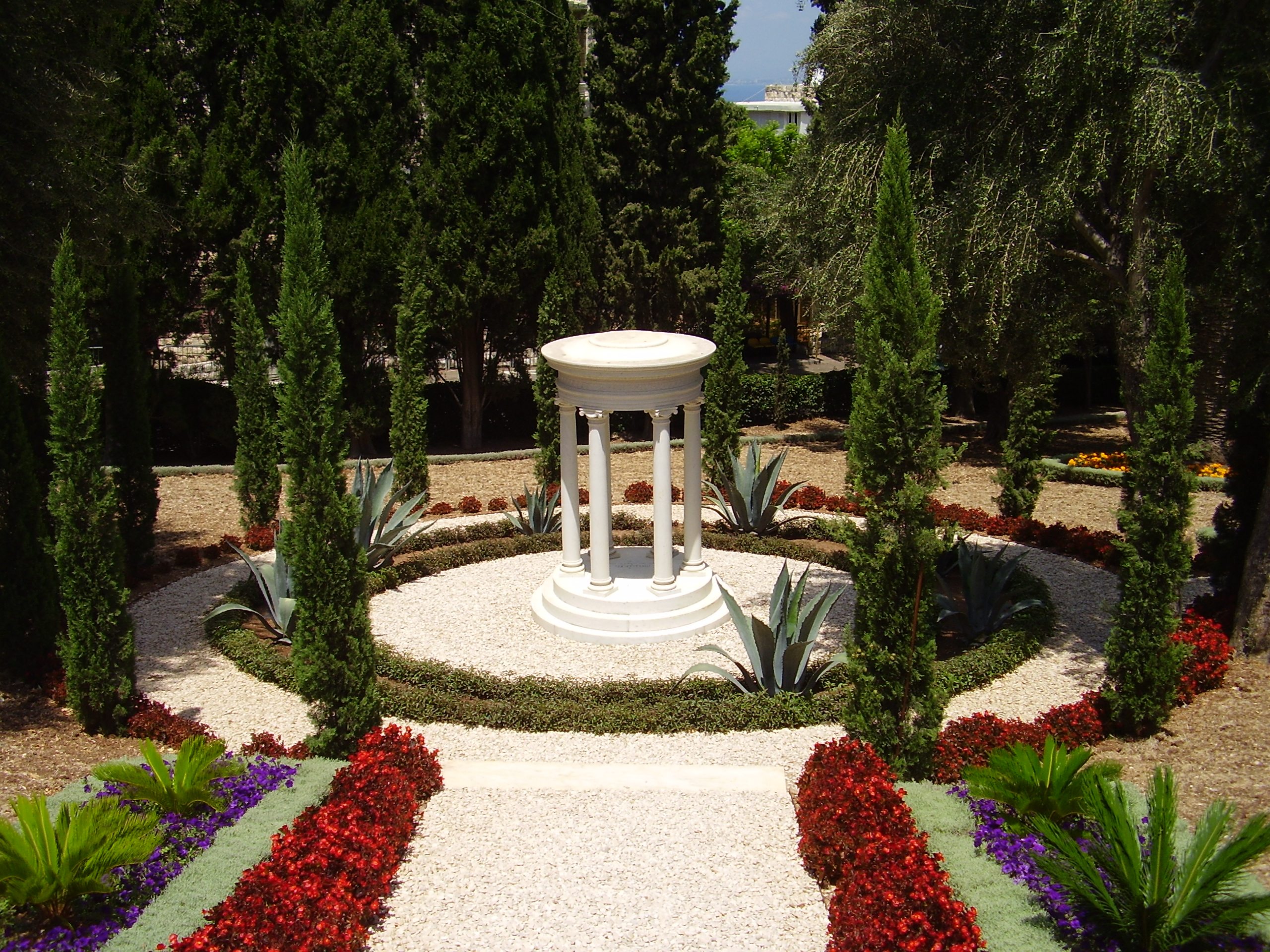
The grave of Munírih Khánum at the Monument Gardens at the Baháʼí World Centre.

Munírih K͟hánum (Persian: منیره خانم; 1847 – April 28, 1938) was the wife of ʻAbdu'l-Bahá, a prominent figure in the Baháʼí Faith. She was entitled the Holy Mother. Her memoirs, first published in 1924, are regarded as one of the first published memoirs by a Persian woman in the 20th century.

== Childhood and early years ==
Munírih Khánum was born Fáṭimih Nahrí, the eldest child of Muhammad ʻAlí Nahrí and his wife, Zahrá of Isfahán in Isfahan. The Nahrí family was a prominent family in the city, and her family were one of the first Bábís of Isfahan who later became eminent Baháʼís of Persia. The family were also highly connected with high-ranking nobles and clerics of the city. Her maternal uncle was killed in Persia at the age of fourteen simply because of his religion. Munírih's birth came as a surprise to her parents. Her father had been married before and had no children. Following the death of his first wife, he married Zahrá Khánum. Munírih was born in 1847, around ten years after her parents' marriage and when they had assumed they would never have children.

=== Education ===
Her father was one of the first Bábís in her city of birth, and Munírih was brought up as a devout Bábí and later Baháʼí under her parents' care. Though it was customary not to educate girls, even of noble birth, her father had his daughter educated and she was a fine writer and poet. Her poetry was reported to be beautiful and she wrote many poems during her marriage and later years. Munírih was fluent in her native Persian and also Arabic and Turkish. She was also well-versed in Persian literature, in the works of Rumi and Nizami which she referred to in her later writings. According to her later memoirs, her father died shortly after her eleventh birthday and she was left in the care of both her maternal and paternal extended families.

=== First marriage ===
As a young woman, Munírih was regarded as a suitable match for marriage to Baháʼí families throughout Persia. However, in her infancy as was the Persian custom her parents had betrothed her to a young man. Some time after the death of her father, her family thought she had come of age for a marriage. They arranged that she be wedded to the young Mírzá Kázim, the youngest brother of the King and Beloved of Martyrs. Munírih was reluctant at first, but due to familiar pressure she begrudgingly consented to the marriage despite her misgivings.

The two were married in an extravagant wedding with the crescendo being the young couple led to the bedchamber. However, Mírzá Kázim fell ill during the wedding ceremony and avoided his bride. The same night he left the house to the horror and consternation of his family. After six months his maid found him dead in the home of the young couple. Munírih was humiliated and overwhelmed. Perplexed, she resolved she would never marry again, instead she spent her days in prayer and meditation.

== Marriage ==
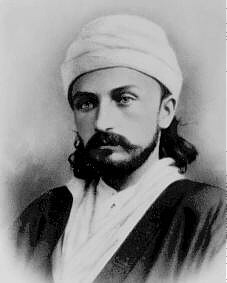
ʻAbdu'l-Bahá as a young man.

In 1871, Baháʼu'lláh and Navváb expressed interest in Munírih to become the wife of ʻAbdu'l-Bahá and she made a wearisome journey to Acre, Palestine. The sister of ʻAbdu'l-Bahá says that her parents wanted Munírih because she was "very beautiful and amiable, and in every way a suitable match". The parents of ʻAbdu'l-Bahá had believed that it was time for him to marry, and though several young women were thought of as potential brides ʻAbdu'l-Bahá explained that he did not want to marry. Munírih's journey began with the departure from Isfahan with the company of her younger brother. She then went on pilgrimage to the house of the Báb and visited the wife of the Báb, Khadíjih-Bagum. Khadíjih related a great number of stories to Munírih about the life of the Báb. She became acquainted with the Báb's family members too (most of which were resentful or indifferent to his religion). The trip to Shiraz was a great delight to the young Munírih.

She arrived in mid-1872 and lived in the house of Mírzá Músá for the time of the betrothal. Munírih later reminisced how she fell instantly in love with the young ʻAbdu'l-Bahá when they met one another. ʻAbdu'l-Bahá had shown little inclination of marriage until he met 24-year-old Munírih Khánum in 1872. After five months betrothal the couple were finally married. Baháʼu'lláh entitled Fáṭimih with the name Munírih (Illumined).

The couple married on March 8, 1873 in the house of ʻAbbúd. Munírih K͟hánum was twenty-five, ʻAbdu'l-Bahá was twenty-eight. The marriage was a happy union. They had nine children: Ḥusayn Effendi (d. 1305/1887, aged five), Mihdí (died aged two-and-a-half), Ṭúbá (died sometime in Akka), Fu'ádíyyih (died in infancy), and Ruḥangíz (died in 1893, she was the favorite grandchild of Baháʼu'lláh) "five of my children died in the poisonous climate of 'Akká" she later bitterly reflected. Four children survived to adulthood – all daughters; Ḍíyáʼíyyih K͟hánum (mother of Shoghi Effendi) (d. 1951) Túbá K͟hánum (1880–1959) Rúḥá K͟hánum and Munavvar K͟hánum (d. 1971). Munírih Khánum was very emotionally attached to her children and devoted to her husband.

=== Family ===
The oldest of these was Ḍíyáʼíyyih, who married Mírzá Hádí Shírází (1864–1955) in 1895; their children were Shoghi Effendi, Rúḥangíz, Mihrangíz, Ḥusayn, and Riyáḍ, who all took the surname Rabbání. The second daughter, Ṭúbá Khánum, married Mírzá Muḥsin Afnán (1863–1927); their children were Rúḥí (1899–1971), Thurayyá, Suhayl, and Fu'ád (d. 1943), who all took the surname Afnán. The third daughter of ʻAbdu'l-Bahá, Rúḥá, married Mírzá Jalál, the son of Mírzá Muḥammad Ḥasan, King of Martyrs; their children were Maryam (d. 1933), Muníb, Zahrá and Ḥasan, who all took the surname Shahíd. The fourth daughter, Munavvar, married Mírzá Aḥmad, the son of Mírzá ʻAbdu'r-Raḥím Yazdí; they were childless. In the 1930s and 1940s a series of marriages linked the sons of Sayyid 'Alí Afnán and Furúghíyyih, who had been supporters of Mírzá Muhammad ʻAlí, with the grandchildren of ʻAbdu'l-Bahá. As a result of these marriages, other inappropriate marriages, or refusal to break ties with Covenant-breakers in the family, Shoghi Effendi, in the 1940s and early 1950s, reluctantly declared all the surviving grandchildren of ʻAbdu'l-Bahá (except himself) Covenant-breakers.

== Life in a prison city ==
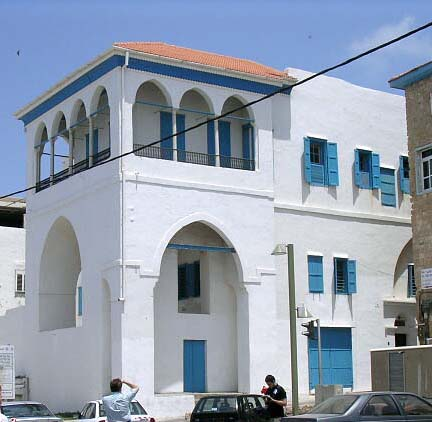
Home of Munírih and her family.

=== During Baháʼu'lláh's lifetime ===
In the 1870s, Munírih and ʻAbdu'l-Bahá lived in the House of ʻAbbúd in the prison city of Akko as political prisoners. Though technically not a prisoner under the Ottoman Empire, she nevertheless was married to one which put her safety in risk. She grew a close attachment with the mother of ʻAbdu'l-Bahá, Navváb and with his sister Bahíyyih Khánum who became her closest friend. The four, along with their brood of children all lived together in the house of ʻAbbúd. The imprisonment was trying times for Munírih Khánum. She witnessed the machinations of her husband's enemies and the death of five of her nine children. The death of her most beloved child, a son named Husayn, caused her unbearable grief and anguish. To console her Baháʼu'lláh wrote a number of prayers for her to read in times of sadness. Husayn's death came at a bad time, as the previous year Navvab had died from a fall, and in 1888 Baháʼu'lláh's brother Mírzá Músá also died.

The death of Baháʼu'lláh in 1892 caused hardship for ʻAbdu'l-Bahá again and his family, after all of his half-siblings turned against him and Munírih too.

=== Appointment of ʻAbdu'l-Bahá as Head of the Faith ===
In the Kitáb-i-ʻAhd ("Book of the Covenant"), Baháʼu'lláh named ʻAbdu'l-Bahá as his successor and head of the Baháʼí Faith. However, Mírzá Muhammad ʻAlí, the half brother of ʻAbdu'l-Bahá, was resentful at the authority of his brother. He began a secret correspondence with Baháʼís of Iran and Ottoman authorities allegedly stating that ʻAbdu'l-Bahá had claimed a station equal to a Manifestation of God and was conspiring with foreign authorities to overthrow the Ottoman Empire. Consequently, ʻAbdu'l-Bahá's whole family was in danger.

ʻAbdu'l-Bahá quietly went for a short trip to the Tiberias leaving Munírih and her family in Akko. Munírih mourned the separation from her husband. Furthermore, restrictions placed upon women added further hardship. ʻAbdu'l-Bahá wrote to his wife:

O thou sorrowful leaf! Be not sad and grieve not…Let not the whisperings of people cause thee grief, and be not saddened by some events. I am the target of these sayings and rumours…They are using you as a scapegoat. I am the target, not you.

The restrictions culminated in the family not able to attend affairs outside of the home. A male figure was needed. A member of the Afnan family of which Baháʼu'lláh had kept in high regard was proposed as a match for Munírih's eldest daughter was proposed. Therefore, her daughter Ḍíyáʼ Khánum was married to Hádí Shírází Afnán in 1895. The young couple were the parents of Shoghi Effendi. Munírih Khánum relied heavily on the support of her sister-in-law Bahíyyih Khánum and the two shared a deeply close friendship. The two also stood firmly beside ʻAbdu'l-Bahá in times of difficulty.

=== Western pilgrims ===
However, there were happy times for the family too. The birth of her first grandchild Shoghi Effendi in 1897 offered comfort for the family and he was doted on. In late 1898 the first pilgrims from the West arrived in Akko to visit ʻAbdu'l-Bahá. Munírih Khánum also became acquainted with them, and she mostly spent her time with the female pilgrims (though Baháʼí teachings emphasize the equality of the sexes, the Baháʼís of the time had to uphold local customs for the sake of harmony). The pilgrimage bought happiness into the family's life after the harsh previous years. The years followed with a flood of pilgrims from both the East and West, of which Munírih and Bahíyyih Khánum looked after.

=== Danger ===
The influx of Western pilgrims offered happiness for the family. However, with the outbreak of World War I the family became almost severed from the world wide Baháʼí community. Trying times followed, especially with Jamal Pasha becoming an enemy of ʻAbdu'l-Bahá who promised to crucify him on Mount Carmel. The enemies of ʻAbdu'l-Bahá had united with Jamal Pasha to slay him. His family were all aware of the grim future, that Sultán ʻAbdu'l-Hamíd's desired to banish ʻAbdu'l-Bahá to the deserts of North Africa where he was expected to perish. Munírih Khánum suffered emotionally and physically from this news, and ʻAbdu'l-Bahá sent her outside of Akko for a break from the stress. News of these threats affected the prosecution of the war in the Palestine theatre (see Battle of Megiddo (1918)) and with the defeat of Jamal Pasha ʻAbdu'l-Bahá was safe as was his family.

== Death of ʻAbdu'l-Bahá ==
In 1921, ʻAbdu'l-Bahá died unexpectedly. Munírih was devastated at the loss of her husband; they had been married for nearly 50 years. She poured her grief in several letters and poems which she composed. In one letter she wrote following the one-year anniversary of her husband's death she writes "should I wish to describe fully this miserable year...I would need seventy reams of paper, and seas of blood." She did console herself with Bahíyyih Khánum and the other mourners, such as Lady Blomfield, who records the aftermath of his death in her famous book The Chosen Highway.

Munírih also firmly backed Shoghi Effendi after he was named head of the religion following the death of ʻAbdu'l-Bahá. In a letter dated December 1924 Munírih, writes to her grandson calling him her "pearl" and beloved. She asks him to pray that she dies peacefully and in "absolute detachment and utter sincerity."

Munírih was a passionate patroness in funding education for girls. Lady Blomfield described Munírih K͟hánum as "a majestic woman, stately yet simple, with an innate dignity and strength of character". Putting much of her energy towards women, she worked to try to open schools for girls and encouraged the Baháʼís of Persia to include women in Baháʼí activities. In one letter she wrote, "thus the education of girls is a matter of the greatest importance and is regarded as an obligatory law. Hence, the friends of the All-Merciful, and the beloved maidservants of the Lord, in all cities and countries must take action and endeavor to their utmost capacity to carry out this weighty injunction."

The death of Munírih's confidante and closest friend Bahíyyih Khánum in 1932 was a further blow, after which she secluded herself from society. Describing her sorrow, she wrote in a poem, "I can endure no more. My patience is ended. My powers have declined. I live on Mount Carmel friendless and alone." She did, however, show great fondness and affection to her eldest grandson and head of the Baháʼí Faith, Shoghi Effendi, and remained faithful to the Covenant of Baháʼu'lláh despite years of infighting within Baháʼu'lláh's family that saw many of them expelled from the religion.

== Death ==
Munírih K͟hánum died in April 1938 aged 91. Shoghi Effendi cabled the Baháʼís:

HOLY MOTHER MUNIRIH KHANUM ASCENDED ABHA KINGDOM. WITH SORROWFUL HEARTS BAHA'IS WORLD OVER RECALL DIVERS PHASES HER RICH EVENTFUL LIFE MARKED BY UNIQUE SERVICES WHICH BY VIRTUE HER EXALTED POSITION SHE RENDERED DURING DARKEST DAYS ʻABDU'L-BAHA'S LIFE. ALL RIDVAN FESTIVITIES SUSPENDED. ADVISE CONVENTION DELEGATES DEVOTE SPECIAL SESSION HER MEMORY HOLD BEFITTING GATHERING AUDITORIUM MASHRIQU'L-ADHKAR.

She is buried near the vicinity of the Shrine of the Báb in the Monument Gardens at the Baháʼí World Centre.
