= Ayatollah (disambiguation) =

Ayatollah is a title for high-ranking Twelver Shia clergy.

Ayatollah may also refer to:

== People ==
- Ayatollah (music producer) (born Lamont Dorrell), hip hop producer
- Roy Moore (born 1947), American judge whose nickname was the "Ayatollah of Alabama"

== Other ==
- "Ayatollah", a 1979 parody song by Steve Dahl.
- The Ayatollah (football celebration), a football celebration used by Cardiff City
- Ayatollah Dollar, a MiniCD EP by Muslimgauze

== See also ==
- List of maraji
- List of deceased maraji
- List of ayatollahs
