= Mírzá Músá =

Apostle of Baháʼu'lláh

Mírzá Músá (Persian: میرزا موسى; d. 1887) was the only full brother of Baháʼu'lláh, meaning that they shared the same mother and father. He was later named by Shoghi Effendi as one of the nineteen Apostles of Baháʼu'lláh.

The life of Mírzá Músá was so bound up with that of Baháʼu'lláh himself, that his life and background mirror the life and travels of Baháʼu'lláh. He was an integral part of correspondence between Baháʼu'lláh and the Baháʼís. He experienced the same imprisonment, exile, assaults, and degrading circumstances that were given to the small band of family members associated with Baháʼu'lláh and ʻAbdu'l-Bahá. Mírzá Músá remained a loyal and faithful follower until he died.

Baháʼu'lláh used Mírzá Músá as an example to show his respect for the law. When an official expressed hesitation to inflict punishment on one of the followers of Baháʼu'lláh who had committed a crime, he replied:

"Tell him, no one in this world can claim any relationship to Me except those who, in all their deeds and in their conduct, follow My example, in such wise that all the peoples of the earth would be powerless to prevent them from doing and saying that which is meet and seemly... This brother of Mine, this Mirza Musa, who is from the same mother and father as Myself, and who from his earliest childhood has kept Me company, should he perpetrate an act contrary to the interests of either the state or religion, and his guilt be established in your sight, I would be pleased and appreciate your action were you to bind his hands and cast him into the river to drown, and refuse to consider the intercession of any one on his behalf."

He also went by the title of Kalím (Arabic: كليم), Áqáy-i-Kalím (Chief Kalím), or Jináb-i-Kalím (Excellent Kalím).

== Family ==
Mírzá Músá had at least three children: Mirza Majdi'd-Din, Ali Rida, and a daughter.

Mirza Majdi'd-Din for a time transcribed the Tablets of Baháʼu'lláh. He was the one who read the Kitáb-i-'Ahd in front of the family upon the passing of Baháʼu'lláh. Later, he supported Mírzá Muhammad ʻAlí, and after his death Shoghi Effendi called him "the most redoubtable adversary of ʻAbdu'l-Bahá".
