= Shoghi Effendi =

Guardian of the Baháʼí Faith from 1921 to 1957

- شوقی افندی
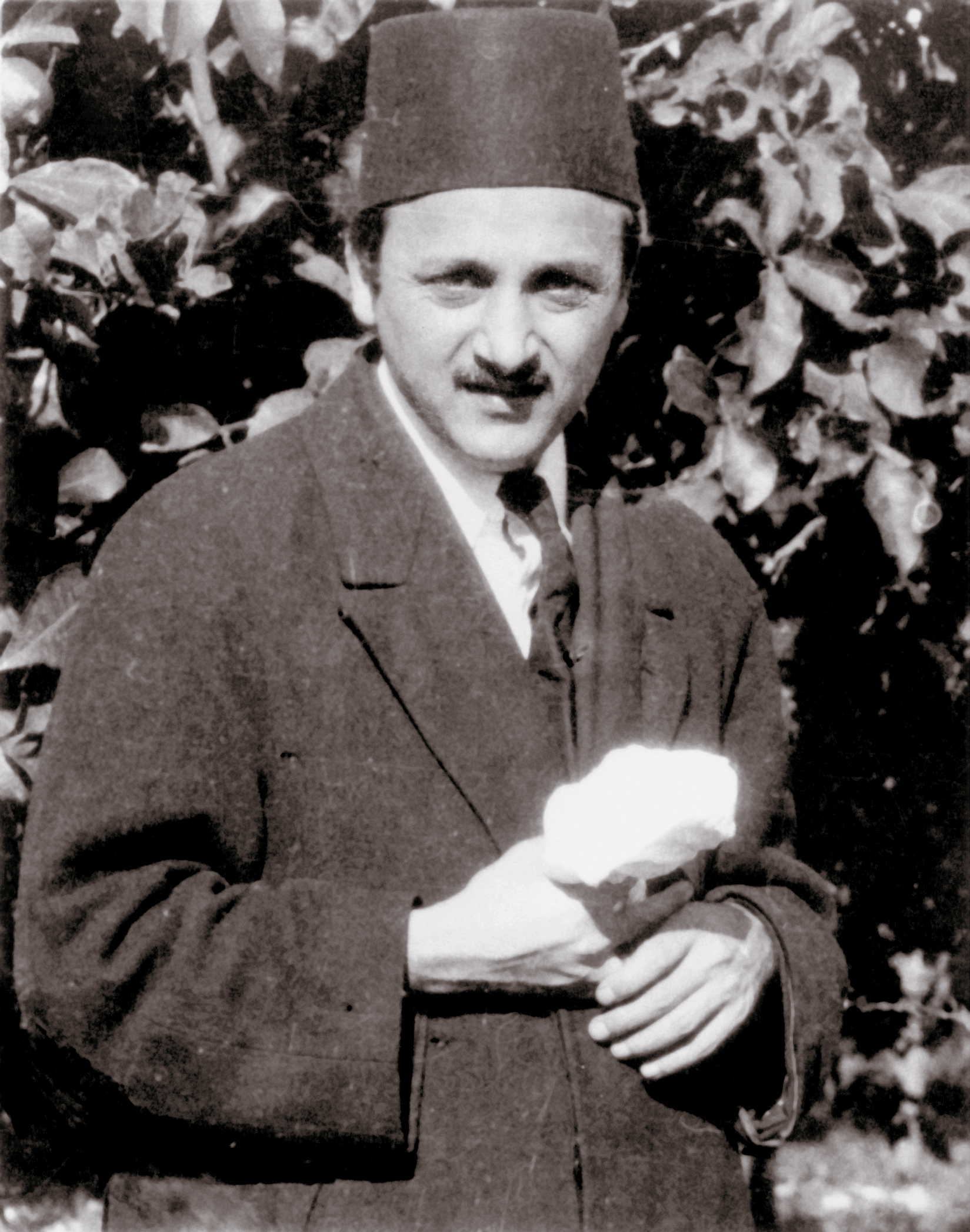
- Shoghi Effendi in Haifa, 1921
- Title: Guardian of the Baháʼí Faith

Personal life
- Born: Shoghí Rabbání; 1 March 1897 Acre, Ottoman Empire
- Died: 4 November 1957 (aged 60) London, England
- Resting place: New Southgate Cemetery; 51.6240°N 0.1441°W
- Spouse: Rúhíyyih Khánum (m. 1937)
- Relatives: Baháʼu'lláh's family

Religious life
- Religion: Baháʼí Faith
- Lineage: Afnán (see: § Ancestry)

Senior posting
- Period in office: 1921–1957
- Predecessor: ʻAbdu'l-Bahá
- Successor: Universal House of Justice

Shoghí Effendi (/ˈʃoʊɡiː ɛˈfɛndi/; (Note: Persian pronunciation: [ʃoːˈɣiː efenˈdiː]; Egyptian Arabic pronunciation: [ˈʃæwʔi (ʔ)æˈfændi]) Persian: شوقی افندی; 1896 or 1897 (Note: Shoghi Effendi's gravesite column records his birth as 3 March 1896. After its erection, his wife found written evidence that his real birthday was 1 March 1897.) – 4 November 1957) was Guardian of the Baháʼí Faith from 1922 until his death in 1957. As the grandson and successor of ʻAbdu'l-Bahá, he was charged with guiding the development of the Baháʼí Faith, including the creation of its global administrative structure and the prosecution of Baháʼí teaching plans that oversaw the expansion of the religion to several new countries. As the authorized interpreter of the Baháʼí literature, he translated the primary written works of the Faith's central figures, providing unity of understanding of its essential teachings and safeguarding its followers from division. Upon his death in 1957, leadership passed to the Hands of the Cause, and in 1963 the Baháʼís of the world elected the Universal House of Justice, an institution which had been described and planned by Baháʼu’llah.

Shoghi Effendi, an Afnán, was born Shoghí Rabbání (Note: Effendi is a Turkish title of respect. 'Shoghi Effendi' is roughly equivalent to 'Sir Shoghi'. He often signed letters as simply 'Shoghi'.) in Acre in the Ottoman Empire, where he spent his early life, but later went on to study in Haifa and Beirut, gaining an arts degree from the Syrian Protestant College in 1918 and then serving as ʻAbdu'l-Bahá's secretary and translator. In 1920, he attended Balliol College, Oxford, where he studied political science and economics. Before completing his studies, news of ʻAbdu'l-Bahá's death reached him, requiring him to return to Haifa. Shortly after his return at the end of December 1921, he learned that the Will and Testament of ʻAbdu'l-Bahá named him Guardian of the Baháʼí Faith. Two crucial aspects of his leadership focused on building the administration and spreading the faith worldwide.

During his 36 years as Guardian, Shoghi Effendi translated and expounded on many of the writings of Bahá’u’lláh and ʻAbdu'l-Bahá, established plans that enabled the faith to spread globally and sent more than 17,500 letters. He kept in touch with progress in all existing Bahá’i communities as well as monitoring and responding to the situation in the Middle East, where the believers were still suffering persecution. He also began work to establish Haifa, Israel, as the Bahá’i World Center. He created an International Bahá’i Council to aid him in his work, several members of which were newly appointed Hands of the Cause. He also presided over the community's expansion from 1,034 localities in 1935 to 2,700 in 1953, and further to 14,437 in 1963. From the beginning to the end of his leadership, the total population of Baháʼís around the world grew from 100,000 to 400,000.

Shoghi Effendi died during a visit to London in 1957, having contracted Asian flu, and is buried at New Southgate Cemetery in the city of London.

== Background ==
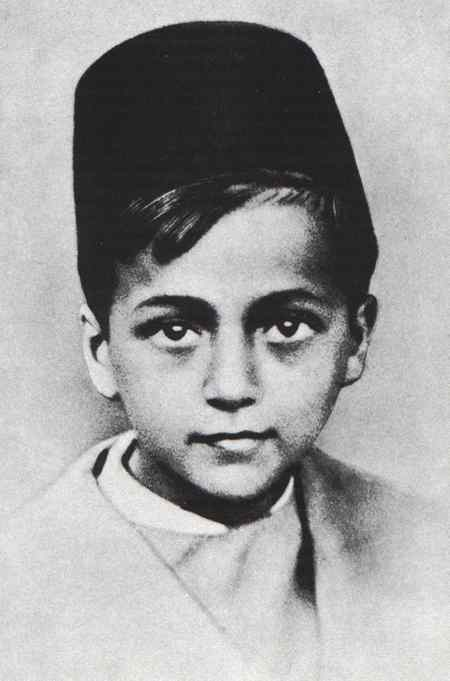
The young Shoghi, c. 1905

Born in Acre in the Acre Sanjak of the Ottoman Empire in 1896 or 1897, Shoghi Effendi was related to the Báb through his father, Mírzá Hádí Shírází, and to Baháʼu'lláh through his mother, Ḍíyáʼíyyih Khánum, the eldest daughter of ʻAbdu'l-Bahá. ʻAbdu'l-Bahá, who provided much of his initial training, greatly influenced Shoghi Effendi from the early years of his life. Shoghi Effendi learned prayers from his grandfather, who encouraged him to chant. ʻAbdu'l-Bahá also insisted that people address the child as "Shoghi Effendi" rather than simply as "Shoghi" as a mark of respect towards him.

As a child, Shoghi Effendi was aware of the difficulties endured by the Baháʼís in Acre, which included attacks by Mírzá Muhammad ʻAlí against ʻAbdu’l-Bahá. Mirza Muhammad-‘Ali, who was ʻAbdu’l-Bahá's younger half-brother and aggrieved by ʻAbdu’l-Bahá's designation as Baháʼu’llah's successor, began plotting to discredit him by falsely claiming that he was the cause of the uprising in Ottoman Syria. The problems which this caused in the Baháʼí community were felt as far away as Iran and beyond. As a young boy, he was aware of the desire of Sultan Abdul Hamid II (reigned 1876–1909) to banish ʻAbdu'l-Bahá to the deserts of North Africa, where he was expected to perish.

=== Tablet from ʻAbdu'l-Bahá ===
Being ʻAbdu'l-Bahá's eldest grandson, the first son of ʻAbdu'l-Bahá's eldest daughter Ḍíyáʼíyyih Khánum, Shoghi Effendi had a special relationship with his grandfather. Zia Baghdadi, a contemporary Baháʼí, relates that when Shoghi Effendi was only five years of age, he pestered his grandfather to write a tablet for him, which ʻAbdu'l-Bahá obliged:

He is God! O My Shoghi, I have no time to talk, leave me alone! You said write, I have written. What else should be done? Now is not the time for you to read and write. It is the time for jumping about and chanting O My God! Therefore, memorize the prayers of the Blessed Beauty and chant them that I may hear them. Because there is no time for anything else.

Shoghi Effendi then set out to memorize several prayers and chanted them as loud as he could. This caused family members to ask ʻAbdu'l-Bahá to quiet him, a request he apparently refused.

=== Education ===
Shoghi Effendi's early education took place at home with other children from the household. It was provided by private tutors, who taught him Arabic, Persian, French, English, and literature. From 1907 to 1909, he attended the College des Frères, a Jesuit institution in Haifa, where he studied Arabic, Turkish, French and English. In 1910, when ʻAbdu'l-Bahá was residing in Egypt before his journeys to the West, Shoghi Effendi was briefly enrolled in the College des Frères in Ramleh.

Plans for him to accompany his grandfather on his travels fell through when the port authorities in Naples prevented him from continuing, ostensibly due to health issues. Upon his return to Egypt sometime after March 1912, he was sent to a Jesuit boarding school in Beirut, transferring in October to the preparatory school attached to the Syrian Protestant College in Beirut, graduating in 1913. Later that year, Shoghi Effendi returned to the Syrian Protestant College as an undergraduate and earned a BA in 1917. Despite enrolling there as a graduate student, he returned to Haifa without completing his degree.

During his time at the Syrian Protestant College, he spent his visits home to Haifa assisting ʻAbdu'l-Bahá in translation, becoming his full-time secretary and translator from the end of 1918.

By the spring of 1919, the intensity of Shoghi Effendi's secretarial work had taken its toll on his health, resulting in recurring occurrences of malaria. By the spring of 1920, he was so unwell that ʻAbdu'l-Bahá arranged for him to convalesce at a sanatorium in Paris. Following his recovery, he enrolled in the Non-Collegiate Delegacy at Balliol College, Oxford to improve his English translation skills.

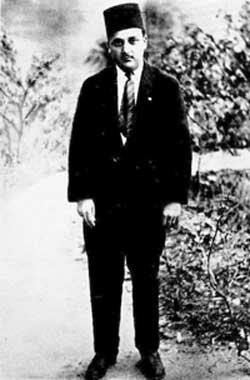
Shoghi Effendi before 1940

=== Death of ʻAbdu'l-Bahá ===
While Shoghi Effendi was studying in England, he learned of the passing of ʻAbdu’l-Bahá in the early hours of 28 November 1921, news that came as a grievous shock, as he had been unaware that his grandfather was ill. Following his return to Haifa on 29 December 1921, the prerequisites of the Will and Testament of ʻAbdu'l-Bahá were announced, unequivocally stating that Shoghi Effendi was to be appointed as ʻAbdu'l-Bahá's successor and Guardian of the Baháʼí Faith. The institution of the Guardianship had been conceived by Baháʼu’llah, with ʻAbdu'l-Bahá outlining its specific functions and jurisdiction in the Will and Testament, two particularly important functions being the interpretation of the Baháʼí teachings and guiding the Baháʼí community.

=== Private life and marriage ===
Shoghi Effendi's personal life was subordinate to his work as Guardian , and it was not until 1950 that he secured the secretarial support he required to handle the mounting correspondence. By then, he had established a timetable of continuous hard work while in Haifa, with summer breaks during which he spent time in Europe, initially in the Swiss Alps, and in 1929 and 1940 traversed Africa from south to north.

On March 24, 1937, Shoghi Effendi married Mary Maxwell, entitled Rúhíyyih Khánum, a Canadian. She was the only child of May Maxwell, a disciple of ʻAbdu'l-Bahá, and William Sutherland Maxwell, a Canadian architect. Shoghi Effendi had first met Mary as a girl when she came on pilgrimage with her mother in 1923. She made another pilgrimage as a teenager with two of her mother's close friends. With Shoghi Effendi's encouragement, Mary became an active Baháʼí teacher and a letter written to him described her as "a beautiful and most refreshing girl to know".

In 1936, Shoghi Effendi wrote to Mary and her mother, inviting them to visit Haifa. They arrived in January 1937, and a discreet courtship between Shoghi Effendi and Mary ensued. At the time of their marriage, Mary was 26 years old and a tall, athletic woman who had spent 18 months living in Nazi Germany with her cousin before coming to Haifa. The couple exchanged vows in the room of Bahíyyih Khánum in the House of ʻAbdu'l-Bahá in Haifa. The ceremony was brief with Rúhíyyih Khánum wearing black. Only a select few were aware of the wedding, including the witnesses and a small group of Haifa residents. Consequently, the news of the marriage came as a surprise to the global Baháʼí community when Shoghi Effendi's mother cabled the Baháʼís.

Announce Assemblies celebration marriage beloved Guardian. Inestimable honour conferred upon handmaid of Baháʼu'lláh Ruhiyyih Khanum Miss Mary Maxwell. Union of East and West proclaimed by Baháʼí Faith cemented. Ziaiyyih mother of Guardian.

While Shoghi Effendi and Rúhíyyih Khánum never had children, Rúhíyyih Khánum became his constant companion and helpmate; in 1941, she became Shoghi Effendi's principal secretary in English. In a rare public statement, revealing his private sentiments, in 1951 he described his wife as "my helpmate, my shield in warding off the darts of Covenant breakers and my tireless collaborator in the arduous tasks I shoulder".

Shoghi Effendi held Iranian (Persian) nationality throughout his life and travelled on an Iranian passport, although he never visited Iran.

=== Leadership style ===
Shoghi Effendi was 24 when he became Guardian of the Baháʼí Faith, and, following a short break to prepare himself for what this entailed, he began to address the task at hand. With his Western education and Western dress, Shoghi Effendi’s leadership style was noticeably different from that of his grandfather ʻAbdu'l-Bahá. His letters to Baháʼís were signed "your true brother”, and rather than referring to his personal role as Guardian, his focus was instead on the institution of the guardianship. He expended his energy on building the Faith worldwide, laying the foundations for its the Baháʼí World Centre, and relying on extensive correspondence rather than direct travel to communicate advice to a growing global community. He spent time with the many Baháʼís who visited Haifa on pilgrimage, inspiring and teaching them, and often using them as emissaries when they returned to their various home communities.

=== Administration ===
One of Shoghi Effendi’s main objectives on becoming Guardian was to organise the administrative work of the Baháʼí World Centre, with an initial focus on sustaining correspondence with a growing number of Baháʼís throughout the world. This involved the need for secretarial assistance, which in the early years came from his father and two Persian Baháʼís who had served as secretaries to ʻAbdu'l-Bahá. Between late 1924 and 1927, he received assistance initially from John Esslemont, and following his untimely death a year later, from Ethel Rosenberg, both of them Baháʼís from the UK. He was also assisted in this work by several members of his family. In an attempt to reduce his correspondence, Shoghi Effendi encouraged Baháʼí communities to publish and distribute newsletters to other communities, the newsletter generated from Haifa including news from the Baháʼí World Centre and Baháʼí activities around the world, thus alleviating the need for Baháʼís to send him letters asking for information. As an extension of the Baháʼí World Centre, he established a Baháʼí Bureau in Geneva, representing the community at international forums and meetings as well as international organisations which had their headquarters in Geneva.

During the early years of his guardianship, Shoghi Effendi focused on the formation and nurturing of national and local Spiritual Assemblies to encourage the spread of the Faith and as a prerequisite for the election of the Universal House of Justice. National bodies were elected according to ʻAbdu'l-Bahá’s instructions and using procedures set down by Shoghi Effendi, who took on responsibility for defining the requirements for their election, detailing their authority, outlining and evaluating rules for their functioning, and managing the application of these criteria in various situations and social conditions. The first three national spiritual assemblies were established at Shoghi Effendi’s instruction in Great Britain, India and Germany in 1923.

In 1951, Shoghi Effendi began expanding international Baháʼí institutions, appointing twelve Hands of the Cause as ʻAbdu'l-Bahá stipulated in his will. In the same year, he established the International Baháʼí Council, a secretariat and advisory body whose members were initially appointed and subsequently elected, and which increasingly took on responsibility for communicating with the community and interacting with the government of Israel. In 1952, he appointed seven further Hands of the Cause, adding another eight in 1957. In 1954, he asked the Hands of the Cause to appoint 36 people to serve on five continental Auxiliary Boards to assist them in their work. The purpose in forming these international institutions appeared to be the provision of support in carrying out expansion goals for the Ten Year Crusade in conjunction with preparation for the election of the Universal House of Justice.

Shoghi Effendi was instrumental in developing the Baháʼí World Centre, initially buying the mansion at Bahji, near Akko (formerly Acre), in which Baha’u’llah lived until he died in 1892, where the Shrine of Baháʼu'lláh is situated, and around which he purchased extra land and created extensive gardens. He supervised the construction of the golden-domed building over the Shrine of the Báb, developed the surrounding land and erected the International Archives building in the vicinity. He also endorsed plans involving the establishment of a centre which was to evolve into a network of buildings, landscaped gardens and shrines, and which was to be recognised by Baháʼís worldwide as the centre of the Baháʼí Faith.

In 1937, Shoghi Effendi instructed the National Spiritual Assembly of the Baháʼís of the United States and Canada to complete the exterior of the Baháʼí House of Worship in Wilmette, Illinois, as one of the goals of their Seven-Year Plan. This was finally completed in 1943, with the temple’s dedication taking place in May 1953. On 23 August 1955, Shoghi Effendi announced that Africa would build its first House of Worship in Kampala, Uganda; the temple was dedicated in January 1961.

=== Growth ===
During the years when Shoghi Effendi was Guardian of the Baháʼí Faith, the number of believers expanded to more than 400,000, and the plans he instituted during this time surpassed their goals. Before the first plan was initiated in 1935, there were 139 spiritual assemblies worldwide, with Baháʼís living in 1,034 locations. These numbers had increased to 670 spiritual assemblies and 2,700 locations by 1953. That year, he launched a 10-year global crusade whose purpose was to establish the faith worldwide, the faith spreading widely in parts of Latin America, sub-Saharan Africa, India, Southeast Asia, and the Pacific islands. Although Shoghi Effendi died in 1957, by 1963 the geographical presence of the Baháʼí Faith in the world had increased to 14,437 localities, with 56 national assemblies and 3,551 local spiritual assemblies.

=== Other ===
In a more secular cause, before World War II he supported the work of restoration-forester Richard St. Barbe Baker to reforest Palestine, introducing him to religious leaders from the major faiths of the region, from whom backing was secured for reforestation.

== Translations and writings ==
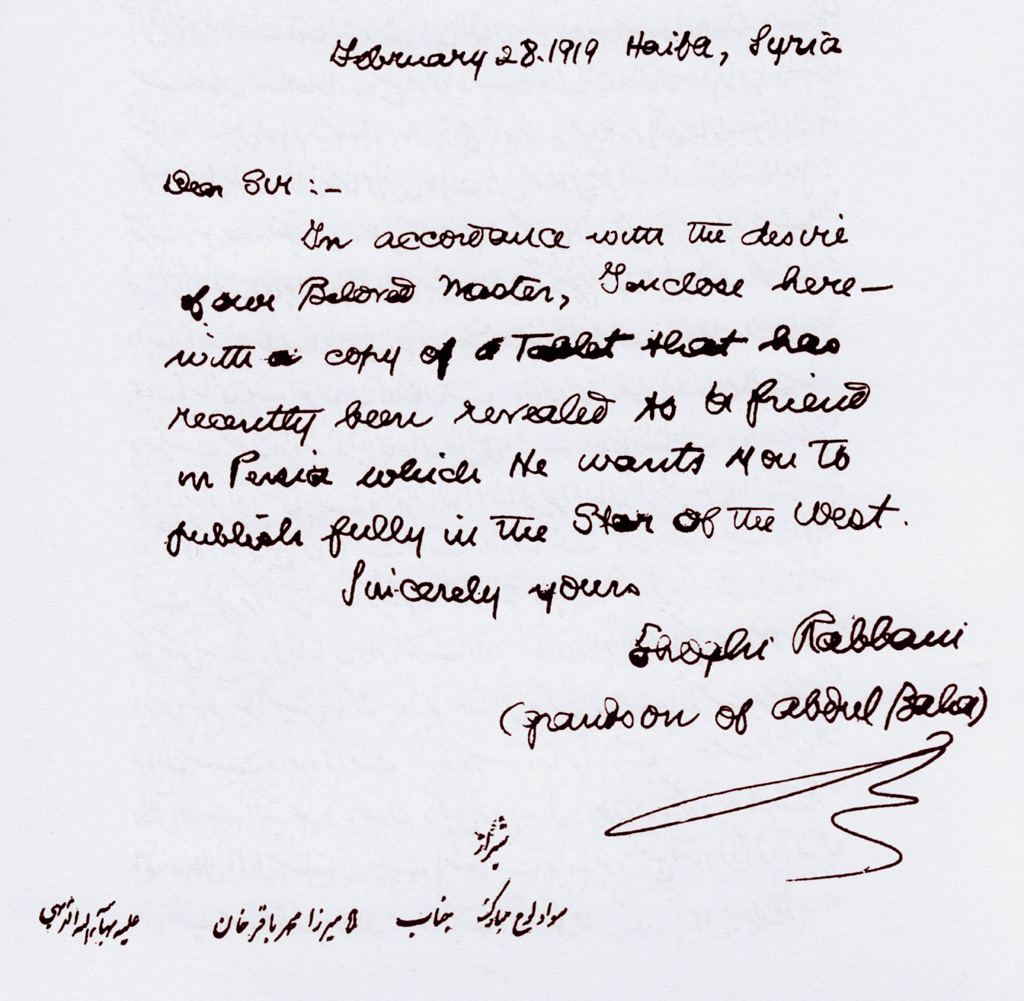
One of Shoghi Effendi's earliest letters as Abdu'l-Bahá's amanuensis, 1919

Shoghi Effendi wrote extensively in English and Persian. As Guardian of the Baháʼí Faith, ʻAbdu'l-Bahá had assigned to him the responsibility of interpreting the word of God, with the authority to impart the meaning and implications of the words of both Baháʼu'lláh and ʻAbdu'l-Bahá. Since Shoghi Effendi’s interpretations are regarded as being authoritative and irrevocable, his writings are regarded as being a primary element in forming modern Baháʼí belief. He was also instrumental in translating many of Baháʼu'lláh's writings, including the Hidden Words in 1929, the Kitáb-i-Íqán in 1931, Gleanings in 1935 and Epistle to the Son of the Wolf in 1941. He also translated such historical texts as The Dawn-Breakers. His significance is not just that of a translator, but also that of the designated and authoritative interpreter of the Baháʼí writings. His translations, therefore, are a guideline for all future translations of the Baháʼí writings.

The vast majority of his writings were in the style of letters to Baháʼís from all parts of the globe. These letters, of which 17,500 have been collected thus far, are believed to number a total of 34,000 unique works. They ranged from routine correspondence regarding the affairs of Baháʼís around the world to lengthy letters to the Baháʼís of the world addressing specific themes. Some of his longer letters and collections of letters include World Order of Baháʼu'lláh, Advent of Divine Justice, and Promised Day is Come.

Other letters included statements on Baháʼí beliefs, history, morality, principles, administration and law. He also wrote obituaries of some distinguished Baháʼís. Many of his letters to individuals and assemblies have been compiled into several books which stand out as significant sources of literature for Baháʼís around the world. The only book he wrote was God Passes By in 1944, to commemorate the religion's centennial. The book, which is in English, is an interpretive history of the first century of the Bábí and Baháʼí Faiths. A shorter Persian language version was also written.

== Opposition ==
Mírzá Muhammad ʻAlí was ʻAbdu'l-Bahá's half-brother and was mentioned by Baháʼu'lláh as having a station "beneath" that of ʻAbdu'l-Bahá. Muhammad ʻAli later challenged ʻAbdu'l-Bahá for leadership and was ultimately excommunicated, along with several others in the Haifa/Acre area who supported him. When Shoghi Effendi was appointed Guardian, Muhammad ʻAli tried to revive his claim to leadership, suggesting that Baháʼu'lláh's mention of him in the Kitáb-i-'Ahd amounted to a succession of leadership. But Muḥammad-‘Alí had forfeited his right to that station by opposing the authority of ‘Abdu’l-Bahá, and his attempt at leadership was widely ignored.

It was generally anticipated that the Universal House of Justice would be elected soon after ‘Abdu’l-Bahá’s passing, but Shoghi Effendi determined that the Faith’s global administrative structure must be built up first, as ‘Abdu’l-Bahá’s Will called for the House of Justice to be elected by the national Spiritual Assemblies, which had not yet come into existence.

Throughout Shoghi Effendi's life, nearly all remaining family members and descendants of ʻAbdu'l-Bahá were declared by him as covenant-breakers when they didn't abide by Shoghi Effendi's request to cut contact with covenant-breakers, as specified by ʻAbdu'l-Bahá. Other branches of Baháʼu'lláh's family had already been declared Covenant-breakers in ʻAbdu'l-Bahá's Will and Testament. At the time of his death, there were no living descendants of Baháʼu'lláh that remained loyal to him.

== Unexpected death ==
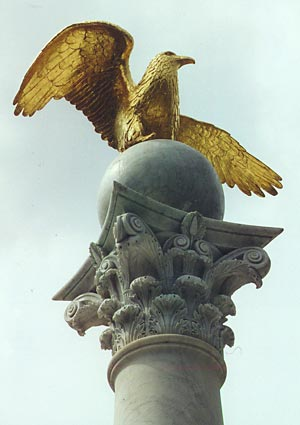
Shoghi Effendi's resting place in London at the New Southgate Cemetery

Shoghi Effendi's death came unexpectedly in London, on 4 November 1957, as he was travelling to Britain and caught the Asian Flu, during the pandemic which killed two million worldwide, and he is buried there in New Southgate Cemetery. His wife sent the following cable:

Shoghi Effendi beloved of all hearts sacred trust given believers by Master passed away sudden heart attack in sleep following Asiatic flu. Urge believers remain steadfast cling institution Hands lovingly reared recently reinforced emphasized by beloved Guardian. Only oneness heart oneness purpose can befittingly testify loyalty all National Assemblies believers departed Guardian who sacrificed self utterly for service Faith.

— Ruhiyyih

Future hereditary Guardians were envisioned in Baháʼí scripture as being appointed from one to the next. Each Guardian was to be appointed by the previous from among the male descendants of Baháʼu'lláh, preferably according to primogeniture. The appointment was to be made during the Guardian's lifetime and clearly assented to by a group of Hands of the Cause. At the time of Shoghi Effendi's death, all living male descendants of Baháʼu'lláh had been declared Covenant-breakers by either ʻAbdu'l-Bahá or Shoghi Effendi, leaving no suitable living candidates. This created a severe crisis of leadership. The 27 living Hands gathered in a series of six conclaves (or signed agreements if they were absent) to decide how to navigate the uncharted situation. The Hands of the Cause unanimously voted it was impossible to legitimately recognize and assent to a successor. They announced on 25 November 1957 they would assume control of the Faith, certified that Shoghi Effendi had left no will or appointment of successor, said that no appointment could have been made, and elected nine of their members to stay at the Baháʼí World Centre in Haifa to exercise the executive functions of the Guardian (these were known as the Custodians).

=== Ministry of the Custodians ===
In Shoghi Effendi's final message to the Baha'i World, dated October 1957, he named the Hands of the Cause of God, "the Chief Stewards of Baháʼu'lláh's embryonic World Commonwealth." Following the death of Shoghi Effendi, the Baháʼí Faith was temporarily stewarded by the Hands of the Cause, who elected among themselves nine "Custodians" to serve in Haifa as the head of the Faith. They oversaw the transition of the International Baháʼí Council into the Universal House of Justice. This stewardship oversaw the execution of the final years of Shoghi Effendi's ordinances of the ten-year crusade (which lasted until 1963), culminating and transitioning to the election and establishment of the Universal House of Justice, at the first Baha'i World Congress in 1963.

As early as January 1959, Mason Remey, one of the custodial Hands, declared that he was the second Guardian and successor to Shoghi Effendi, even though he met none of the criteria of Abdu'l-Bahá's will and had signed the Proclamations of the Hands of the Cause affirming that Shoghi Effendi had not, and could not have, appointed a successor. That summer after a conclave of the Hands in Haifa, Remey abandoned his position and moved to Washington D.C., then soon after announced his claim to absolute leadership, and attracted about 100 followers, mainly in the United States. Remey was excommunicated by a unanimous decision of the remaining 26 Hands. Although initially disturbed, the mainstream Baháʼís paid little attention to his movement within a few years.

=== Election of the Universal House of Justice ===
At the end of the Ten Year Crusade in 1963, the Universal House of Justice was first elected. It was authorized to adjudicate on situations not covered in scripture. As its first order of business, the Universal House of Justice evaluated the situation arising from the Guardian's failure to appoint a successor. It determined that under the circumstances, given the criteria for succession described in the Will and Testament of ʻAbdu'l-Bahá, there was no legitimate way for another Guardian to be appointed. Although the Will and Testament leaves provisions for a succession of Guardians, Shoghi Effendi remains the first and last occupant of this office. Bahá'u'lláh envisioned a scenario in the Kitáb-i-Aqdas in which the line of Guardians would be broken before the establishment of the Universal House of Justice, and in the interim the Hands of the Cause of God would administer the affairs of the Baha'i community.

== Guardianship ==
The institution of the 'Guardian' provided a hereditary line of heads of the religion, in many respects similar to the Shi'i Imamate. Each Guardian was to be appointed by the previous from among the Aghsán (male descendants of Baháʼu'lláh), preferably according to primogeniture. The appointment was to be made during the Guardian's lifetime and clearly assented to by a group of Hands of the Cause. The Guardian would be the head of the Universal House of Justice, and had the authority to expel its members. He would also be responsible for the receipt of Huqúqu'lláh, appoint new Hands of the Cause, provide "authoritative and binding" interpretations of the Baháʼí writings, and excommunicate Covenant-breakers.

The issue of successorship to ʻAbdu'l-Bahá was in the minds of early Baháʼís, and although the Universal House of Justice was an institution mentioned by Baháʼu'lláh, the institution of the Guardianship was not clearly introduced until the Will and Testament was publicly read after his death.

In the will, Shoghi Effendi found that he had been designated as "the Sign of God (Ayatollah), the chosen branch, the Guardian of the Cause of God". He also learned that he had been designated as this when he was still a small child. As Guardian, he was appointed as head of the religion, someone to whom the Baháʼís had to look for guidance.

=== Shoghi Effendi on the Guardianship ===
Building on the foundation that had been established in ʻAbdu'l-Bahá's will, Shoghi Effendi elaborated on the role of the Guardian in several works, including Baháʼí Administration and the World Order of Baháʼu'lláh. In those works, he went to great lengths to emphasize that he himself and any future Guardian should never be viewed as equal to ʻAbdu'l-Bahá, or regarded as a holy person. He asked Baháʼís not to celebrate his birthday or display his picture. In his correspondences, Shoghi Effendi signed his letters to Baháʼís as "brother" and "co-worker," to the extent that even when addressing youth, he referred to himself as "Your True Brother."

Shoghi Effendi wrote that the infallibility of his interpretations extended only to matters relating to the Baháʼí Faith, not to subjects such as economics and science.

Shoghi Effendi explained that the successor appointed in ‘Abdu’l-Bahá’s Will was not just the Guardianship; it was the Administrative Order, headed by the Universal House of Justice, which was first elected in 1963. With this understanding, Shoghi Effendi delineated a distinct separation of powers between the "twin pillars" of the Guardianship and the Universal House of Justice. The roles of the Guardianship and the Universal House of Justice are complementary, the former providing authoritative interpretation, and the latter providing flexibility and the authority to adjudicate on "questions that are obscure and matters that are not expressly recorded in the Book." Shoghi Effendi went into detail explaining that the institutions are interdependent and had their own specific spheres of jurisdiction. For example, the Guardian could define the sphere of legislative action and request that a particular decision be reconsidered, but could not dictate the constitution, override the decisions, or influence the election of the Universal House of Justice. In explaining the importance of the Guardianship, Shoghi Effendi wrote that without it the World Order of Baháʼu'lláh would be "mutilated." At the same time, Shoghi Effendi indicated that “Severed from the no less essential institution of the Universal House of Justice this same System of the Will of ‘Abdu’l‑Bahá would be paralyzed in its action and would be powerless to fill in those gaps which the Author of the Kitáb-i-Aqdas has deliberately left in the body of His legislative and administrative ordinances.” In its legislation the Universal House of Justice turns to the mass of interpretation left by Shoghi Effendi. The existence of the institution of the Guardianship for 36 years under Shoghi Effendi and its ongoing interpretative authority in the decision making of the Universal House of Justice demonstrates how the Administrative Order is neither "mutiliated" nor "paralyzed.". The House of Justice has explained that the Will and Testament had allowed for different possibilities for the Faith’s future leadership after the first Guardian: a House of Justice with and without a Guardian. Thus, in not appointing another Guardian, Shoghi Effendi had been faithful to the inherent logic of ‘Abdu’l-Bahá’s Will, and as foreshadowed in verse 42 of the Kitáb-i-Aqdas, the line of Guardians ended with the Faith under the direction of the Universal House of Justice alone.

== Ancestry ==
Ancestors of Shoghi Effendi

Hájí Mírzá Abú'l-Qásim
Siyyid Muhammad-Husayn Afnán
Mírzá Hádí Shírází
Xivar-Sultan Khanum
Shoghi Effendi
Baháʼu'lláh, founder and head of Baháʼí Faith
‘Abdu’l-Bahá, head of Baháʼí Faith
Ásíyih Khánum
Ḍiyá'iyyih Khánum
Mírzá Muḥammad ‘Alíy-i-Nahrí
Munírih Khánum
Zahrá-i-Nafaqih-Furush

== See also ==
- Baháʼí Terraces
- Baháʼí teaching plans
- Mandatory Palestine
- Baháʼí pilgrimage

== Citations ==
Religious titles
Preceded by ʻAbdu'l-Bahá	Leader of the Bahá'í Faith; 1921–1957	Succeeded by The Hands of the Cause
