= List of people from Cheltenham =

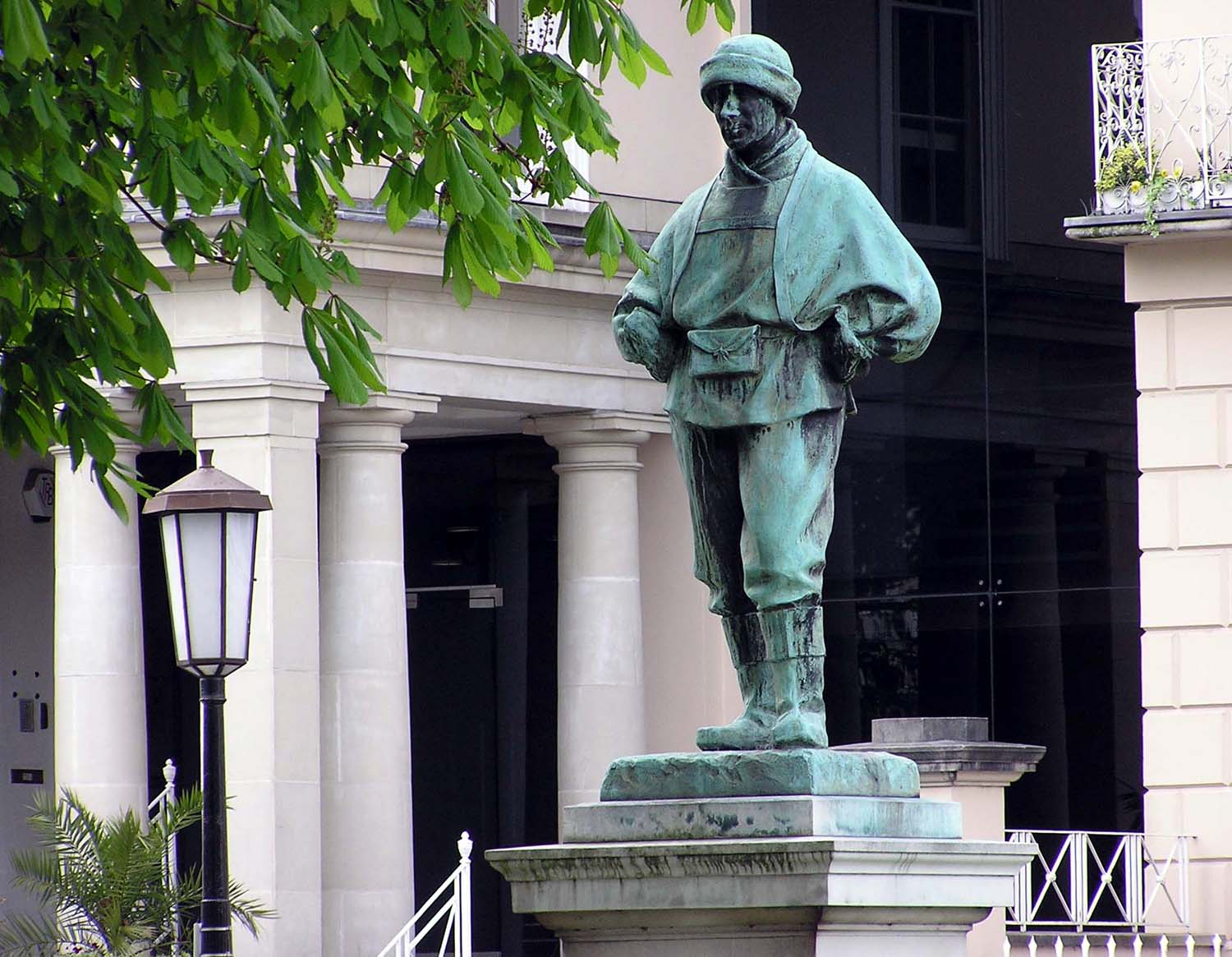
Statue of Edward Adrian Wilson in the town centre. Born Cheltenham 1872, died Antarctica 1912. The plinth reads: Edward Wilson of the British Antarctic Expedition reached the South Pole on January 17, 1912 and died with Captain Scott on the Great Ice Barrier in March 1912 ruby

This is a list of Notable Cheltonians, or people from Cheltenham in Gloucestershire by occupational groups, ordered alphabetically. Information not found on a person's Wikipedia page must be referenced:

== Arts ==
- Jake Chapman (born 1966), artist famous for his work with his brother Dinos Chapman, was born in Cheltenham.
- Frances Emilia Crofton (1822–1910), artist, lived in Cheltenham.
- P. J. Crook (born 1945), artist, was born and lives in Cheltenham.
- Clarence Dobell (1836–1917), artist and illustrator, born in Cheltenham.
- Clive Piercy (1955–2017), graphic designer and author, was born in Cheltenham.
- Meredithe Stuart-Smith (born 1957), designer, lives in Cheltenham.

== Literature ==
- Sarah Burney (1772–1844), novelist, retired to Cheltenham in 1841 and died there.
- Claude Reignier Conder (1848–1910), co-authored the work Survey of Western Palestine, on behalf of the Palestine Exploration Fund
- Geoff Dyer (born 1958), novelist, author and journalist, was born and raised in Cheltenham.
- James Elroy Flecker (1884–1915), poet and playwright, was educated at Dean Close School.
- Winifred Foley (1914–2009), chronicler of the Forest of Dean, retired to Cheltenham in 1998 and died there.
- Stephen Graham (1884–1975) journalist, travel writer and author lived in Cheltenham until the age of 14.
- James Payn (1830–1898), novelist and journal editor, was born in Cheltenham.
- John Simpson (born 1953), lexicographer, was born in Cheltenham and attended Dean Close School.
- Kate Thornton (born 1973), journalist and television presenter, was born in Cheltenham.

== Military service ==
- Duncan Gordon Boyes (1846–1869), awarded the Victoria Cross, was born in Cheltenham and educated at Cheltenham College.
- Sidney Osborne Bufton (1908-1993), Royal Air Force officer, awarded the Distinguished Flying Cross, founded the Pathfinder project was educated at Dean Close School.
- John Rouse Merriott Chard (1847-1897), British Army officer, awarded t1he Victoria Cross for actions at Rorke's Drift, was educated at Cheltenham Grammar School.
- Henry George Crowe (1897-1983), Royal Air Force officer, flying ace awarded the Military Cross, was educated at Dean Close School.
- William Alfred Dimoline (1887-1965), British Army general, awarded the Distinguished Service Order and Military Cross was educated at Dean Close School.
- Henry Hadley (1863–1914), often deemed "the first British casualty of the First World War", was born in Cheltenham and educated at Cheltenham College.
- Sir Arthur "Bomber" Harris, 1st Baronet (1892–1984), Marshall of the Royal Air Force, commander of Bomber Command in the Second World War, was born in Cheltenham.
- Craig Harrison (born 1974), British Army soldier, held the record for the longest confirmed sniper kill in combat, was born in Cheltenham
- Sir Capel Lofft Holden (1856-1937), British Army general, engineer and designer of Brooklands motor racing circuit, was born in Cheltenham
- Alan Geoffrey Page (1920-2000), Royal Air Force officer, WW2 flying ace and founding member of the Guinea Pig Club was educated at Dean Close School.
- Frank William Ramsay (1875-1954), British Army general, awarded the Distinguished Service Order was educated at Dean Close School.
- Wilfrid St Clair Tisdall (1921-2014), British Army officer, awarded the Military Cross was educated at Dean Close School.

== Music ==
- Michael "Würzel" Burston (1949–2011), guitarist for the heavy metal band Motörhead, was born in Cheltenham.
- Jaz Coleman (born 1960), lead singer of Killing Joke, was born and raised in Cheltenham.
- FKA Twigs (born 1988), singer-songwriter and dancer, was born in Cheltenham.
- 4ft Fingers, a punk rock band, was formed in Cheltenham in 1996.
- Christopher Gunning (1944–2023), composer, was born in Cheltenham.
- Gustav Holst (1874–1934), composer, was born in Cheltenham and attended Cheltenham Grammar School.
- Brian Jones (1942–1969), founder of the Rolling Stones, was born in Cheltenham.
- Dame Felicity Lott (1947-2026), opera and concert soprano, was born in Cheltenham.
- Andrew McCrorie-Shand (born 1955), composer, was born in Cheltenham.
- Richard O'Brien (born 1942), creator of the Rocky Horror Show, was born in Cheltenham.
- Pigbag (formed 1980), post-punk band formed in Cheltenham.
- Kitty Brucknell (born 1984), singer, was born in Cheltenham.
- Screaming Dead (formed 1980), the band often claimed as the founders of horror punk, was formed in Cheltenham.
- Inkubus Sukkubus (formed 1989), Gothic and Pagan band, was formed in Cheltenham.
- Solemn Sun (formed 2009), punk band formed in Cheltenham.

== Politics and public service ==
- Sir James Tynte Agg-Gardner (1846–1928), brewery owner, Lord of Cheltenham Manor and its Conservative Member of Parliament in 1874–1880, 1885–1895, 1900–1906 and 1911–1928
- Henry Bellingham, Baron Bellingham of Congham (born 1955) Conservative Member of Parliament, was born in Cheltenham.
- Dorothea Beale (1831–1906), headmistress of Cheltenham Ladies' College
- Sir Douglas Dodds-Parker (1909–2006), Conservative MP for Cheltenham in 1964–1974 and World War II member of the Special Operations Executive
- Charles Hodson, Baron Hodson of Rotherfield Greys, (1895-1984) Military Cross recipient and British judge, was born in Cheltenham and educated at Cheltenham College.
- Fred G. Hughes (1837–1911), five-times member of Arizona Territorial Legislature, was born in Cheltenham.
- Charles Irving (1924–1995), Conservative MP for Cheltenham, 1974–1992
- Nigel Jones, Baron Jones of Cheltenham (1948–2022), Liberal Democrat MP for Cheltenham (1992–2005)
- Robin Janvrin, Baron Janvrin of Chalford Hill (born 1946) naval officer, diplomat and private secretary to Queen Elizabeth II, was born in Cheltenham.
- Elizabeth Neesom (c. 1797/98 – 30 November 1866) – prominent English Radical and Chartist born in Cheltenham
- Richard Pate or Pates (1516–1588), founder of Pate's Grammar School, was born in Cheltenham.
- John Tolkien (1917-2003) English Roman Catholic priest and eldest son of J.R.R. Tolkien, was born in Cheltenham
- Sir John Wood (1870–1933) of the Indian Civil Service was born in Cheltenham.
- Sir Ian Yeaman (1889-1977) soliciter and president of the Law Society, was educated at Dean Close School.

== Sciences and humanities ==
- Jabez Allies (1787–1856), folklorist and antiquarian, retired and died in Cheltenham.
- Piers Coleman (living), physicist, was raised in Cheltenham.
- Dr Henry Anstey Cookson, pathologist, lived in Cheltenham.
- Napoleon Cordy (1902–1977), Mayanist scholar, was born in Cheltenham.
- Robert Etheridge (1847–1920), Anglo-Australian palaeontologist and curator of the Australian Museum from 1895, was born in Cheltenham.
- Dr Leopold George Hill (1866-1922), physician and medical missionary, was born and raised in Cheltenham.
- John H. Mercer (1922–1987), glaciologist and geographer, was born and raised in Cheltenham.
- Samuel Richard Tickell (1811–1875) soldier, artist, linguist and ornithologist, died in Cheltenham

== Sports ==
- Alex Gregory (born 1984), Olympic gold medallist in rowing, was born in Cheltenham
- Michael Bailey (born 1954), first-class cricketer, was born in Cheltenham.
- Paul Casey (born 1977), professional golfer, was born in Cheltenham.
- Sean Conway, endurance swimmer, lives in Cheltenham.
- Steve Cotterill (born 1964), footballer and football manager, played for Cheltenham Town F.C. and other League teams.
- Martin Devaney (born 1980), footballer with Cheltenham Town F.C. and other professional teams.
- Eric Dier (born 1994), footballer with Tottenham Hotspur, was born in Cheltenham.
- Eddie "The Eagle" Edwards (born 1963), Olympic ski-jumper, was born in Cheltenham.
- Bob Foster (1911–1982), professional motorcycle racer known as the Cheltenham Flyer, won the 1950 350cc world championship.
- Matt Gotrel (born 1989), rower, gold medallist in men's eight rowing at the Summer Olympics 2016, was born and lives in Cheltenham.
- Sir Geoff Hurst, international footballer, in 1966 he was the first player to score a hat-trick in a World Cup Final, lives in Cheltenham.
- Gilbert Jessop (1874–1955), among the fastest-scoring test cricketers, was born in Cheltenham.
- Jack Lisowski (born 1991), professional snooker player.
- Claude Myburgh (1911–1987), cricketer and soldier, was born in Cheltenham.
- William Pollock (1859–1896), chess player, was born in Cheltenham.
- Zac Purchase (born 1986), Olympic gold-medal rower, was born in Cheltenham.
- Mike Summerbee, Swindon Town, Manchester City and England footballer, was raised in Cheltenham.
- Leon Taylor (born 1977), Olympic silver-medallist diver, was born and educated in Cheltenham.
- Edward Adrian Wilson (1872–1912), explorer who joined Scott on his ill-fated Antarctic Expedition, was born in Cheltenham and attended Cheltenham College.
- Sir John Wood (1870–1933), first-class cricketer, was born in Cheltenham.

== Stage ==
- Samuel Blenkin (born 1996), actor, was born in Cheltenham
- Ernest Cossart (1876–1951), actor, was born in Cheltenham and attended Cheltenham Grammar School.
- Mike Grady (born 1946), character actor, was born in Cheltenham.
- Robert Hardy (1925–2017), actor, was born and raised in Cheltenham.
- Damaris Hayman (1929–2021), character actress, was educated at Cheltenham Ladies' College.
- Martin Jarvis (born 1941), actor, was born in Cheltenham.
- Mark Lester (born 1958), who played Oliver Twist in the 1968 film Oliver!, lives in Cheltenham.
- Richard Loncraine (born 1946), film and television director, was born in Cheltenham.
- Arthur Negus, (1903–1985), broadcaster and antiques expert, lived and died in Cheltenham.
- Josh O'Connor, (born 1990), who played Prince Charles in The Crown, was born in Cheltenham and attended St Edward's School.
- Ralph Richardson (1902–1983), actor, was born in Cheltenham.
- Corrinne Wicks (born 1968), actress, was born and raised in Cheltenham.

== Trade ==
- Sir George Dowty (1901–1975), inventor and businessman, set up Dowty Aviation in Cheltenham.
- Jullian Marc Dunkerton (born 1965) businessman and co-founder of Superdry, headquartered in Cheltenham. He also lives in Cheltenham.
- John Nevil Maskelyne (1839–1917), magician and pay-toilet inventor, was born in Cheltenham.
- Sir Frederick Handley Page (1885–1962), founder of the aircraft maker Handley Page, was born in Cheltenham and attended Cheltenham Grammar School.

== See also ==
- People from Cheltenham
- List of people from Gloucestershire
