= Dean Close School =

Public school in Cheltenham, Gloucestershire, England

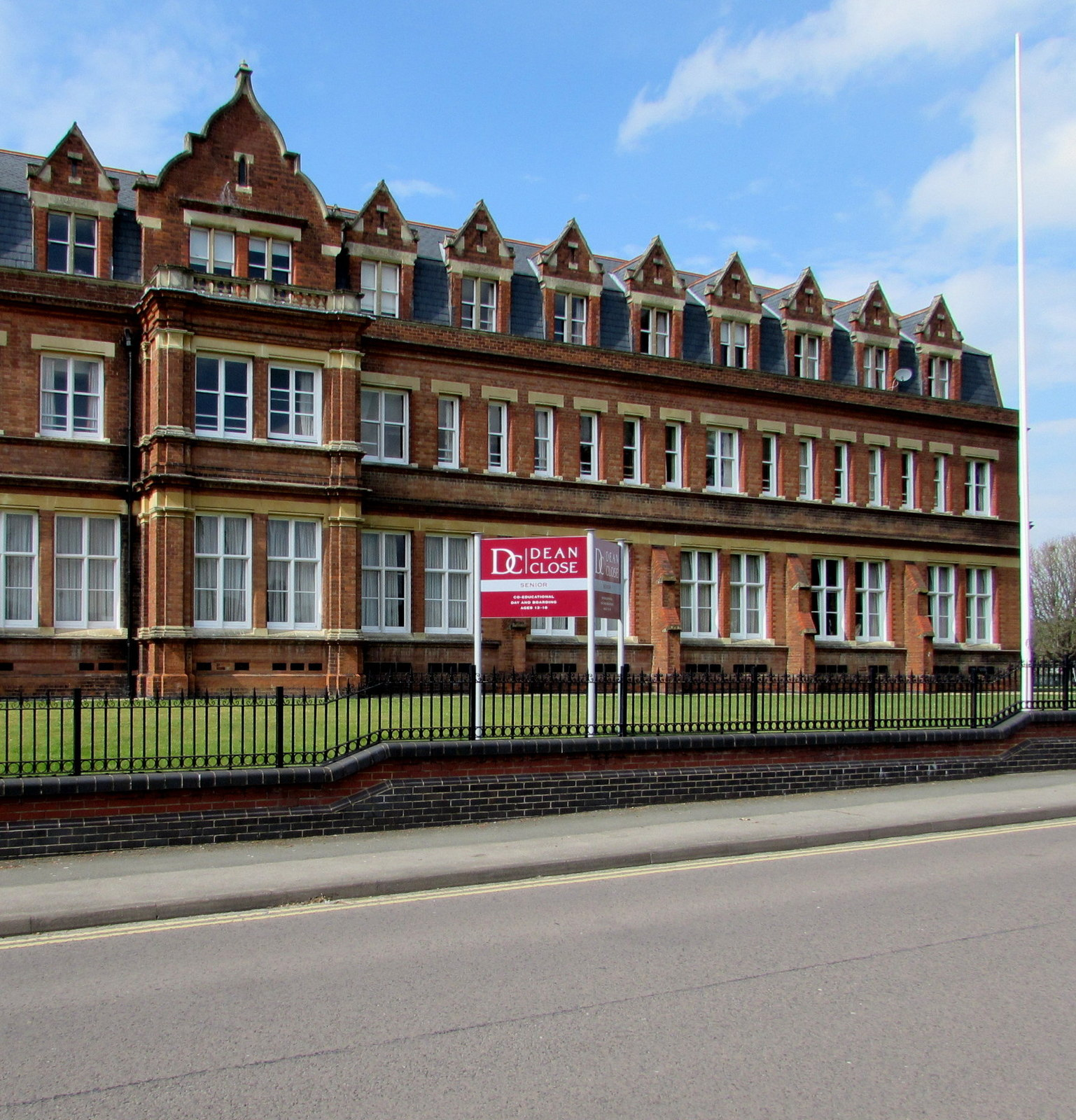
- Dean Close School, Cheltenham

Location
- Shelburne Road; Cheltenham, Gloucestershire, GL51 6HE; United Kingdom; 51°53′34″N 2°6′18″W

Information
- Type: Public school Private boarding and day school
- Motto: Verbum Dei Lucerna ("God's word, a guiding light")
- Religious affiliation: Church of England
- Established: 1886; 140 years ago
- Department for Education URN: 115797 Tables
- President: Dame Janet Trotter, President of the council
- Chairman of the trustees: Mark Smith
- Head: Ali Harber
- Gender: Co-educational
- Age: 2 to 18
- Enrolment: 550 pupils (Senior), 450 pupils (Preparatory and Pre-Preparatory)
- Colours: Maroon and Navy
- Publication: The Young Decanian and The Decanian
- Preparatory School: Dean Close Preparatory School
- Former Pupils: Old Decanians (ODs)
- Warden of the Dean Close Foundation: Areti Bizior
- ISI Report: Routine Inspection 2024
- Website: www.deanclose.org.uk

Dean Close School is a fee-charging co-educational English private boarding and day school (for pupils aged 3–18) located in Cheltenham, Gloucestershire, England. The school opened in 1886 as the 79th public school in the Victorian period, and is divided into pre-prep, preparatory and senior schools located on separate but adjacent sites outside Cheltenham town centre, occupying the largest single private area of land within the town, at some 50 acres.

Established in 1886 as an all-boys school, the school became co-educational in 1970. It takes day pupils, as well as boarders. Children as young as three join the pre-preparatory school, and the senior school teaches up to the age of eighteen.

Since 2015, the school has been led by a foundation, the Dean Close Foundation, incorporating a number of private schools including Dean Close School, its Preparatory and pre-Preparatory Schools, Dean Close Kingham Hill School, Dean Close St John's, Dean Close Airthrie School, and a series of nurseries branded 'Dean Close Little Trees'. The first Warden was Jonathan Lancashire, holding the role concurrently with his role in the Senior School. He was replaced by Emma Taylor in 2016.

== History ==
The school, originally called "Dean Close Memorial School", was founded in 1886, the 79th of the 103 Victorian public schools in order of foundation, and named after Reverend Francis Close, Dean of Carlisle Cathedral. Former pupils include the poet James Elroy Flecker, whose father was the school's first headmaster (the old Flecker Hall was named after him), and the artist Francis Bacon.

Other Notable Old Decanians include musician and founding member of The Rolling Stones Brian Jones; George Adamson; Major General William Dimoline; Major-General Frank William Ramsay; Bernard Ribeiro, Baron Ribeiro; WW2 fighter ace Wing Commander Geoffrey Page; Air Commodore Henry Crowe; Air Vice Marshal Sidney Osborne Bufton; Wellesley Tudor Pole; Richard St. Barbe Baker; Major Wilfrid St Clair Tisdall; Oliver C. Allison; Verrier Elwin; Emma Sky; Emmy Winner and BAFTA Award nominee Hugh Quarshie; actor Ernest Cossart; and television presenter Jeremy Wade.

In the First World War around 700 Old Decanians took up arms, more than 120 former pupils were killed; their names, along with the names of 71 young men killed during the Second World War, are recorded in the school's memorial chapel which was consecrated in 1923.

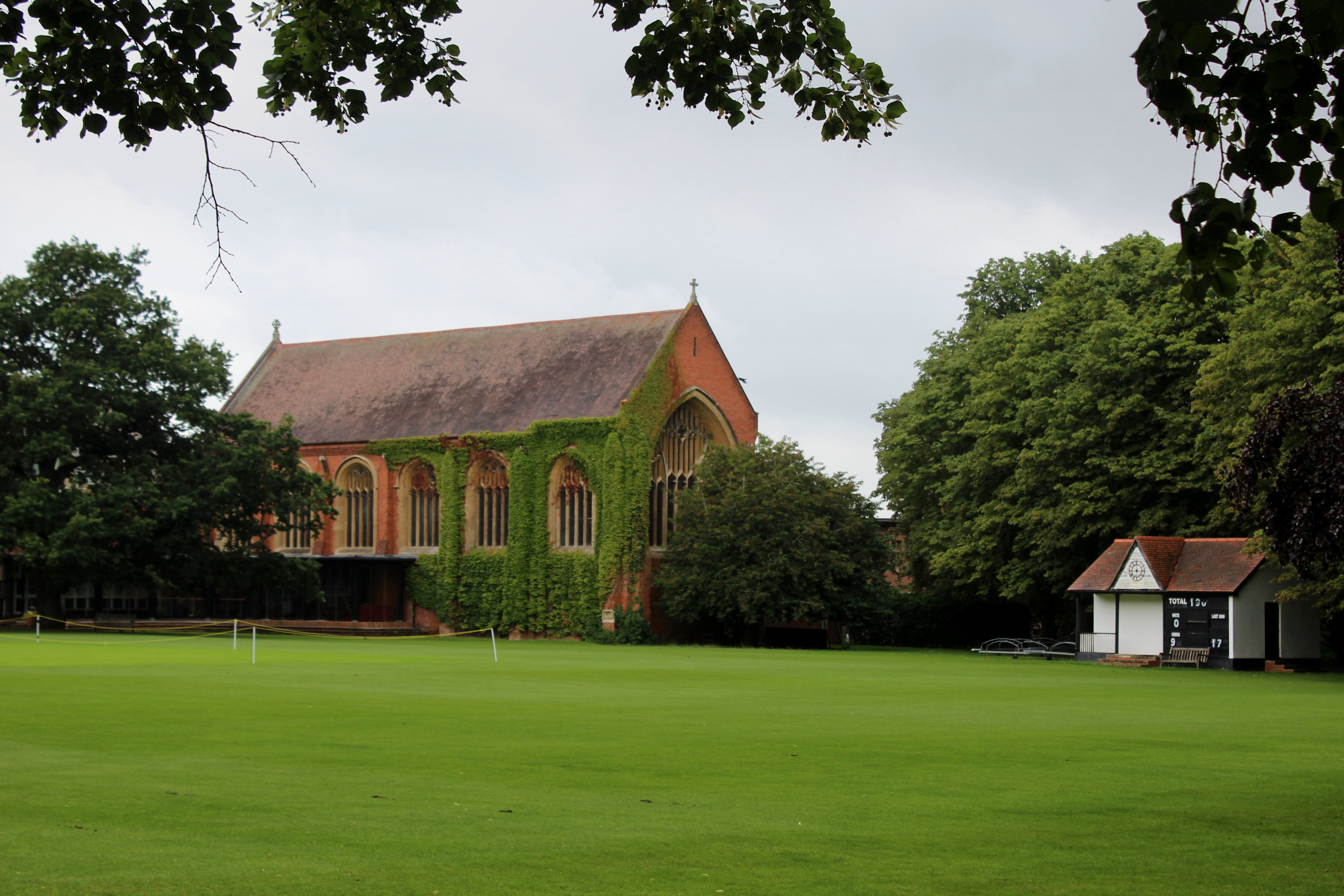
Dean Close School Chapel (consecrated in 1923)

The school buildings were requisitioned by the Home Office during the Second World War and the staff and pupils were removed to Monkton Combe School near Bath in Somerset. Ultimately, the buildings were not required by the government, and were handed back in 1940. In December of the same year, the school was hit by five bombs during air raids. Two of the bombs caused substantial damage to the Junior School and shrapnel damage can be observed on what was the Careers building, now an administrative office.

In 1951, Princess Elizabeth visited Cheltenham and inspected the school CCF Guard of Honour on Shelburne Road outside the school.

The school hosted the JACT Greek summer school from 1969 to 1985, under the aegis of the then headmaster Christopher Turner.

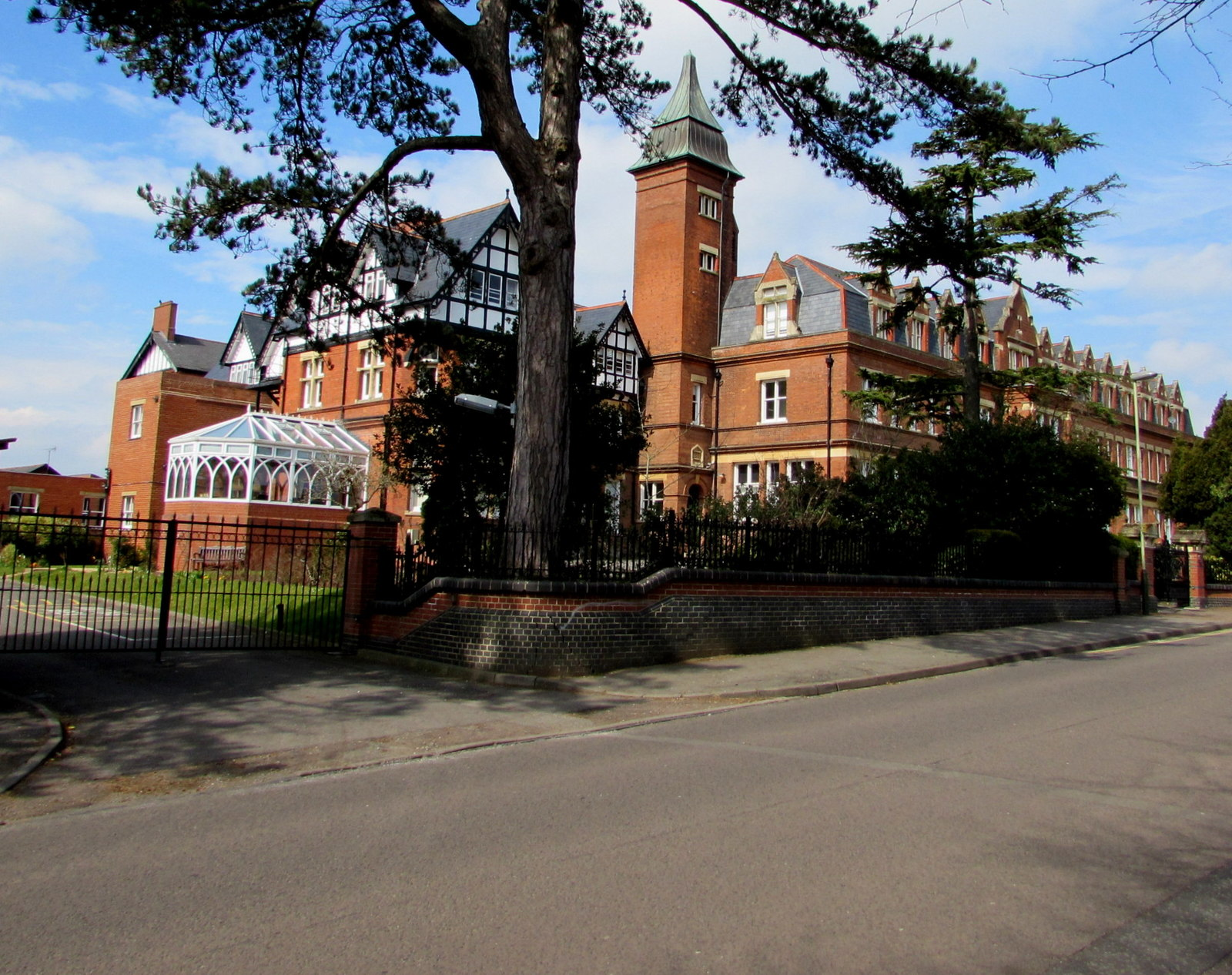
East side of Dean Close School

In 1986, the school hosted Princess Alexandra of Kent as they celebrated its centenary.

The Flecker Library was opened by the Archbishop of Canterbury in 1997.

In the early 2000s, the then head teacher Rev. Tim Hastie-Smith advised author Jilly Cooper on her up-coming novel Wicked!, which was set in an independent school.

Prince Edward, Earl of Wessex opened Brook Court, a boy's boarding house.

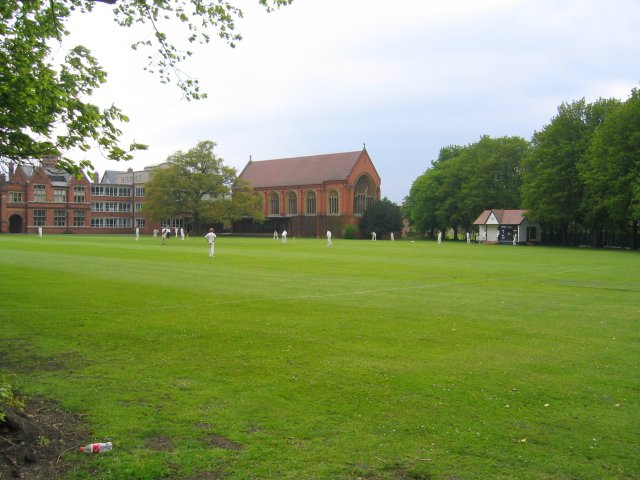
Dean Close School cricket match

The most recent additions to the school's property are a £3 million sports hall and a £4.5 million prep school hall which opened in October 2013. Rory Bremner officially opened the school hall in 2015.

In June 2015, the Dean Close Foundation announced the acquisition of a preparatory school, St John's on the Hill (now Dean Close St John's), Chepstow. In 2020, the school announced the further acquisition of another preparatory school, Airthrie in Cheltenham.

In May 2025, the Dean Close Foundation announced the acquisition of Kingham Hill School, a private boarding and day school set in 105 acres (42 ha) in the Cotswolds.

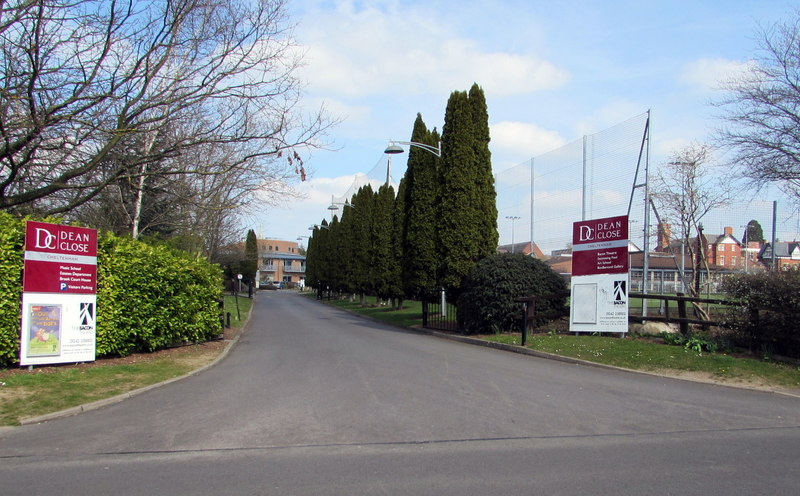
Southern entrance to Dean Close School and the Bacon Theatre

== Academic achievement ==
2023 Results:

- GCSE: 54% achieved grades 9–7.
- A Level: 37% attained grades A* or A, with 63% achieving grades A* to B.

2019 Results (pre-pandemic):

- GCSE: 60% scored grades 9–7.
- A Level: 28% secured grades A* or A, with 70% achieving grades A* to B.

A-Level results in 2007 saw the school achieve a 100% pass rate with 81% of exams graded A–B. These results have put Dean Close in the top 100 schools in England as ranked by UCAS points per candidate.

As of 2014, Dean Close School is ranked 61st in co-educational senior boarding schools by A Levels, with 43% of pupils achieving A level A & A* grades. 60% of pupils at Dean Close School also achieved GCSE level A & A* grades.

== Combined Cadet Force (CCF) ==
Dean Close has a long tradition of cadets. The school had an affiliate tri-service Combined Cadet Force which has a history dating back to 1909 as the Officer Training Corps, in 1948 it was later developed to the Combined Cadet Force.

=== Dean Close CCF Sections ===
Dean Close School CCF consists of Army. The school used to have a Navy and Air Force section, however these were both discontinued. Dean Close CCF (Army Section) are attached to the Rifles Regiment, and consequently Army cadets berets have the Rifles Bugle as their cap badge.

=== Royal Visit ===
In 1951, Princess Elizabeth visited Cheltenham and inspected the school CCF Guard of Honour on Shelburne Road outside the school. Accompanying Princess Elizabeth was A.N. Gilks, the Headmaster at the time. The Coronation of Queen Elizabeth II on 2 June 1953 was marked at Dean Close School with a ‘Coronation Holiday’ that ran from 30 May to 3 June, allowing Decanians to share the occasion with their families.

=== Remembrance Day ===
Every year on Remembrance Day, all Dean Close staff and pupils gather in front of the school chapel and mark Remembrance Day with a military-styled remembrance service conducted by the Dean Close Combined Cadet Force. It is then followed by a two-minute silence in honour of the pupils and soldiers who gave their lives in the First and Second World Wars. The two-minute silence is ended with the Last Post. There is also a remembrance service which takes place inside the chapel for all staff and pupils.

In April 2016, the headmaster signed the Armed Forces Covenant on behalf of the school.

== Sport ==
Dean Close shares a long-standing public school sporting rivalry with Cheltenham College which has lasted more than 140 years. In 1886, Dean Close, with only 43 boys, sent a formal challenge to the larger Cheltenham College for a rugby match. The college sent a reply "Eton we know and Harrow we know, but who are ye?". It is often considered a classic underdog story.

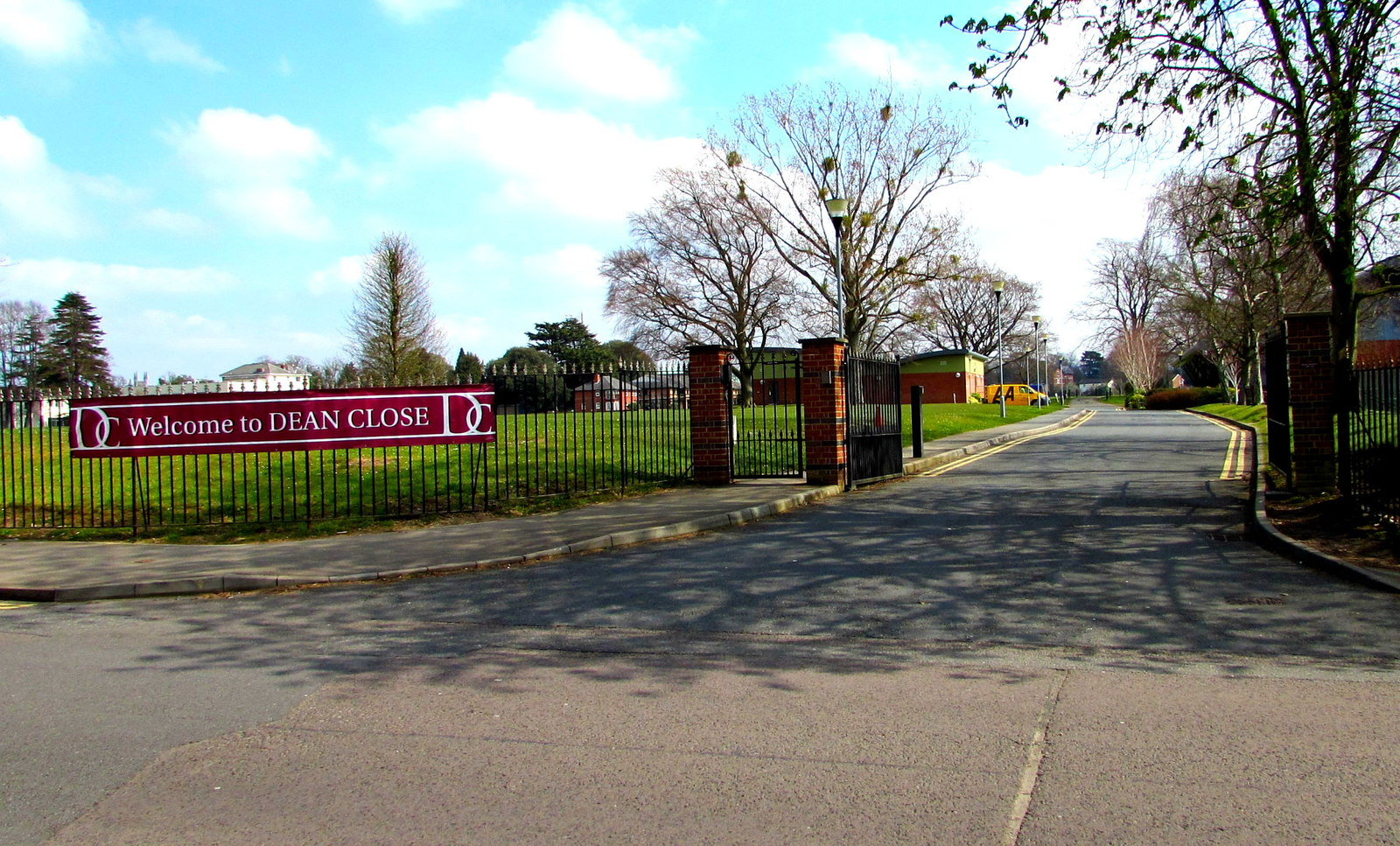
Dean Close School sports entrance

Over the last two decades, Dean Close has qualified as national finalists every year for both boys' and girls' indoor and outdoor hockey.

The school is known for its hockey, but has also been successful in rugby.

In February 2013, the U18 girls won the Schools' National Hockey Competition, and were silver medalists in the final of the indoor format. In the summer of 2012 the U16 boys' hockey team won the School National Hockey competition. In the Summer of 2009, Dean Close U18 boys hockey team won the School National Hockey competition. They also reached the School National Hockey Finals again in 2010 and 2011. In 2012, Dean Close equestrians won the National Schools' Cross-Country Champions and the National Schools' Two-Day Event.

== Schola Cantorum ==
The Abbey School, Tewkesbury, was founded by Miles Amherst in 1973 as the choir school for Tewkesbury Abbey. When the school closed in 2006, its choir (The Choir of the Abbey School, Tewkesbury) was renamed Tewkesbury Abbey Schola Cantorum at Dean Close and given a home at Dean Close Prep School. The choir of men and children sings traditional choral evensong in the abbey on weekdays during term time, and special services on other occasions.

The choir has a catalogue of recordings on the Delphian, Guild, Naxos, Priory, Regent, Hyperion and Signum labels. It has performed in the UK and around the world, including with the BBC National Orchestra, and broadcasts choral evensong on BBC Radio 3.

The choir has toured the US, France, Germany, Italy, Sweden and the Netherlands. Gabriel Jackson, Mark Blatchly, John Caldwell and Grayston Ives have all written for the choir, which, in 2007, also gave the first performance of Bob Chilcott's The Night He Was Born.

== Houses (Senior) ==
House	Year Group	Type	Notes
Brook Court	Senior	Boys' boarding	(opened by Prince Edward, Earl of Wessex)
Dale	Senior	Boys' day	
Fawley	Senior	Girls' boarding	
Field	Senior	Boys' day	
Gate	Sixth form	Boys' boarding	
Hatherley	Senior	Girls' day	
Shelburne	Senior	Girls' boarding	
Tower	Senior	Boys' boarding	(renovation opened by Bear Grylls in 2005)
Turner Hall	Sixth form	Girls' boarding	

== Headmasters ==
The following have served as headmasters of the school:

- William Flecker (1886-1924)
- Percy Bolton (1924-1938)
- Hugh Elder (1938-1946)
- Anthony Gilkes (1946-1953)
- Revd Douglas Graham (1954-1967)
- Christopher Turner (1967-1979)
- Christopher Bacon (1979-1998)
- Revd Timothy Hastie-Smith (1998-2008)
- Jonathan Lancashire (2008-2016)
- Bradley Salisbury (2016–2026)
- Ali Harber (2026-present)

== School fees ==
For 2023–2024, the senior school's fees as published by the school are £28,785 a year for day pupils and £42,750 for boarders. Fees in the prep school are up to £23,085 a year for day pupils and up to £30,585 for boarders.

== Notable Old Decanians ==
Former pupils of the school are known as 'Old Decanians', decanus being the Latin for dean.

Eighteen Old Decanians have been awarded the Distinguished Service Order along with eight Distinguished Service Crosses, ninety-seven Military Crosses, and fourteen Distinguished Flying Crosses, and the conflicts in which they have performed these acts have predominantly been during the First and Second World War.

- George Adamson (1906–1989), game warden in Kenya who raised Elsa the lioness. Inspiration for the popular movie Born Free.
- Oliver Claude Allison (1908–1989), Bishop of the Sudan 1955–1974.
- Francis Bacon (1909–1992), artist and painter of Three Studies of Lucian Freud.
- Richard St. Barbe Baker (1889–1982), environmentalist, forester and writer.
- Captain Thomas Guillaume St. Barbe Baker (1895–1966), WW1 Military Cross recipient and pre-war British Nazi.
- Francis Berry (1915–2006), poet and critic.
- Timothy Bliss (born 1940), neuroscientist and a winner of Grete Lundbeck European Brain Research Prize.
- Christopher Brown, (born 1943) composer, particularly of choral music
- Peter Browne (born 1987), professional rugby union player for Harlequins
- Rajiv Ruparelia (1990–2025), Ugandan businessman.
- Denis Parsons Burkitt (1911–1993), surgeon.
- Air Vice Marshal Sidney Osborne Bufton (1908–1993), senior Royal Air Force officer, established the Pathfinder project.
- Ernest Cossart (1876–1951), actor (and brother of composer Gustav Holst).
- Air Commodore Henry George Crowe (1897–1983), senior Royal Air Force officer, WW1 flying ace, and Military Cross recipient.
- Basil Dale (1903–1932), Anglican Bishop of Jamaica 1950–1955.
- Sir Steuart Spencer Davis(1875–1950), Governor of Saint Helena, he named Jonathan the tortoise, currently the oldest known living land animal.
- Major General William Dimoline (1897–1964), senior British Army General.
- Verrier Elwin (1902–1964), British-born Indian Missionary & Anthropologist.
- Robert Evans (born 1943), Regius Professor of Modern History at the University of Oxford.
- David Fieldhouse (1925–2018), historian of imperial economics
- James Flecker (1884–1915), English poet, novelist and playwright.
- Andrew Goudie (born 1945), geographer and Master of St Cross College, Oxford.
- Henry Wylde Edwards Heath (1912–2002), Director of Hong Kong Police Department.
- Stanley Hoare (1903–1994), house master of Brook, hockey player for England, cricketer for Gloucestershire.
- Lieutenant Colonel Sir Geoffrey David Inkin (1934–2013), British Army officer, commanding officer of the Royal Welch Fusiliers and Deputy Lieutenant of Gwent.
- Tom Johnson (born 1982), professional rugby union player for Exeter Chiefs and England
- Brian Jones (1942–1969), musician, guitarist and founding member of the Rolling Stones.
- G. Wilson Knight (1897–1985), literary critic and academic.
- Hugh Lamprey (1928–1996), British Army tank officer, ecologist and bush pilot.
- Sir John Leonard (1926–2002), judge.
- Gordon Luce (1889–1979), scholar and member of the Cambridge Apostles.
- Samer Majali, businessman and former CEO of Gulf Air.
- Ben Marsden (born 1979), hockey player for England.
- Mpumelelo Mbangwa (born 1976), cricketer and commentator.
- Sir Stuart Neil McKinnon (1938–2022), Justice of the High Court.
- Will Merrick (born 1993), actor
- John Metcalf MBE (born 1946), composer.
- Robert Moreland (born 1941), consultant, politician and a former Conservative Party Member of the European Parliament
- Reverend John Marcus Harston Morris (1915–1989), Anglican priest, founder of Eagle comic, launched the British edition of Cosmopolitan, deputy chairman of the National Magazine Company.
- Stephen Neill (1900–1984), Anglican missionary, Bishop of Tirunelveli 1939 & scholar
- Captain Hubert Ernest Newnham (1886–1970) Ceylonese civil servant and politician.
- Sir Edward Talbot Paris (1889–1985), Chief Scientific Adviser to the Home Office.
- Wing Commander Geoffrey Page (1920–2000), Royal Air Force officer, Second World War flying ace pilot.
- Major Wellesley Tudor Pole (1884–1968) British Army officer, Baháʼí, psychic, spiritualist, involved with quest for the Holy Grail of Arthurian Legend, founder of the Silent Minute and resuscitated the Chalice Well Trust.
- Hugh Quarshie (born 1954), actor, BAFTA Award nominee and Emmy Award winner.
- Major-General Frank William Ramsay (1875–1954), senior British Army General during WW1.
- Bernard Ribeiro, Baron Ribeiro (born 20 January 1944), former president of the Royal College of Surgeons.
- John Simpson (born 1953), Chief Editor, Oxford English Dictionary
- Emma Sky (born 1968), Middle East expert and political advisor to U.S. General Ray Odierno.
- Major Wilfrid St Clair Tisdall (1921–2014), Military Cross recipient and British Army officer.
- Jim Thompson (1936–2003), Bishop of Bath and Wells 1991–2001.
- Jeremy Wade (born 1956), television presenter
- Lieutenant-Colonel Francis Spring Walker (1876–1941) British Army officer.
- William Welch (1906–1999), Bishop of Bradwell 1968–1973.
- Sir Ian David Yeaman (1899–1977), English solicitor.
