= Henry Cookson (disambiguation) =

Henry Cookson (born 1975) is a British polar explorer and adventurer.

Henry Cookson may also refer to:

- Henry Wilkinson Cookson (1810–1876), British clergyman and academic
- Harry Cookson (James Henry Cookson, 1869–1922), British footballer
- Henry Anstey Cookson (1886–1949), British pathologist and bacteriologist
