= John Goodchild =

British physician and writer (1851–1914)

John Arthur Goodchild (1851–1914) was a physician; later, he authored several works of poetry and mysticism, most famously The Light of the West.

According to Patrick Benham, Goodchild had a private medical practice in Bordighera, Italy, serving mainly expatriate Britons. From 1873 until the early 1900s, he stayed in Italy during summers and returned to the UK in winters.

Goodchild was an antiquarian influenced by British Israelite ideas and the Golden Dawn esoteric group. He was friends with William Sharp (who wrote as Fiona Macleod), who dedicated his final literary work, The Winged Destiny: Studies in the Spiritual History of the Gael, to Goodchild.

He saw Glastonbury, Iona (Scotland) and Devenish Island (Ireland) as being a triune of holy sites in the British Isles.

== Works ==
- Somnia Medici (1884) - poetry
- The Sage of Sant' Ampelio (1890) - fiction
- A Fairy Godfather (1890) - fairy tale
- Tales in Verse (1893) - poetry
- Lyrics (1893) - poetry
- The Book of Tephi (1897) - poetry
- The Light of the West (1898)

In The Light of the West, Goodchild advanced the theory that under the influence of the Roman church, the feminine had become neglected in Christianity, and that it was the destiny of a revitalised Celtic church to restore the feminine to due prominence in Christian life and thought.

== The Blue Bowl ==
The story is told that, in February 1885, while visiting Bordighera, Italy, Goodchild bought a "bowl and a platter" seen in a tailor's shop. They lay untouched in a cupboard for ten years. Ten years later he felt "directed" by an intense psychic experience to take the "bowl" or "cup" to Bride's Hill, Glastonbury, Somerset, a place he had never previously visited. Arriving in August 1898 he concealed the "Cup" in a pond or sluice beside a thorn tree near the River Brue. This place was reputedly known as the Women's Quarter, Beckery, and according to legend was linked to St Bride. Then, he waited for the future discovery of the cup "by women" as had appeared to him in a vision. He continued to visit the site every year from 1899 until 1906, except the year 1905.

Benham claims the cup was then found and became the focus of a Christian group, including Goodchild and Wellesley Tudor Pole, based in Bristol, who believed the vessel to have formerly belonged to Jesus. The object is reported to now be in the possession of the Chalice Well Trust, based in Glastonbury.

The platter is claimed to have been sent to the "Sons of Garibaldi" which may be a reference to the masonic Rite of Memphis-Misraim, of which Giuseppe Garibaldi was grandmaster for a while.
