= Edward George Horder =

English medical missionary to China

Edward George Horder (1852-Nov 22, 1908) was an English medical missionary to China notable for his work with leprosy patients. As a member of the Church Missionary Society (C.M.S.), Horder spent 25 years in the city of Pakhoi–now Beihai–building and operating the first mission hospital in the Guangdong province. In addition to becoming the second-largest C.M.S. mission hospital in China, Horder's Pakhoi mission station was the first institution in the region to treat leprosy patients. Even after Horder's departure, the hospital remained a health center in Beihai and was the site of service for a generation of new missionaries. Although the leper wing closed in 1936, the hospital itself still survives as the Beihai People Hospital.

== Personal life ==
=== Early life and education ===
Born in 1852 in Surrey, England, Horder spent his childhood in Wandsworth. He then moved to Edinburgh to train as a physician and surgeon, boarding in the household of John Lowe for the duration of his education. Before becoming a missionary, Horder practiced medicine in Clifton, England.

=== Marriage and family ===
In 1889, Horder married Caroline Stubbs, a fellow missionary and the niece of Bishop Burdon. Stubbs contributed heavily to the operation of the Pakhoi Mission and ran the hospital during Horder's departure to Japan in 1894. The couple had one son.

== Missionary service ==
Horder's missionary service began in 1883, where he was sent to Beihai at the behest of senior missionary Bishop John Burdon who had raised funds himself to build a station in Beihai. However, with the outbreak of the Sino-French War, the C.M.S. instead sent Horder to the Haihow mission on the island of Hainan. After serving at Haihow for a year, Horder relocated to the Hong Kong mission, assisting Reverent J.B. Ost in instructing medical students and operating a dispensary.

In April 1886, Horder returned to Beihai to direct the mission station. Assisted by his future wife Caroline Stubbs and missionary Edward Barnard Beauchamp, Horder raised funds to construct a mission hospital by penning letters asking for donations. Construction was completed in July 1887, and the hospital opened shortly thereafter to receive patients–some of the first of which were opium smokers. Within the first six months of operation, the hospital received patients from 300 towns–some as far as 330 miles (530 km) away.

Despite weathering a smallpox epidemic and subsequent bubonic plague outbreak in 1894, the Pakhoi hospital became the largest C.M.S. mission hospital (in terms of patients received) in South China. It also expanded to include a girls' school and leper asylum. Horder later wrote of his service that he wanted to build a hospital where "the manifold and terrible diseases which afflict the people of these parts shall receive skilled and scientific treatment."

Health reasons compelled Horder to leave the Pakhoi hospital multiple times. In 1888, Horder returned to England because of a breakdown resulting from overwork, leaving hospital operations to his wife and a Chinese doctor trained in local traditional medicine. He then returned to Beihai, but left for Japan for medical reasons in 1894. He departed for Beihai in 1897, where he remained until his final return to England in 1906.

=== Leper asylum ===
Horder established the Leper Asylum at the Pakhoi Hospital to aid the nearly 300,000 lepers in the Guangdong province who suffered from intense local prejudice. After Horder performed the first successful cataract surgery on a patient with leprosy, other people with leprosy quickly filtered in to receive care.

To accommodate the new patients–who could not be housed inside the hospital itself for fear of infection–Horder initially built bamboo huts outside the city outskirts. In 1890, he erected a temporary ward for leper patients, which was expanded into a leper asylum. By 1894, three additional buildings were constructed to enlarge the asylum.

Because the asylum suffered from a staff shortage, female patients could not be treated in the newly constructed wards and were instead housed in huts outside the asylum. Other patients were also housed in a small colony of huts a quarter mile from the mission hospital when asylum capacity was reached.

Since leprosy was incurable when Horder operated the asylum, Horder instead worked to improve his patients' quality of life. He and his wife pioneered occupational therapy for their patients, teaching them crafts that ranged from basket-weaving to broom-making. The huts outside the Mission Hospital became a leper village with a variety of trades–including sandal weaving, basket-weaving, broom-making, printing and saw-manufacturing. Even after Horder's departure, the Pakhoi hospital would treat patients with the awareness that "the kind of life [the patient] lives" was a key determinant of a patient's prognosis.

== Legacy ==
The Leper Asylum was commended by the C.M.S. for the "remarkable" work it performed with leper patients, and it remained the largest leper refuge in China for decades after Horder's death. When Horder's wife visited the hospital in 1926 for the 40th anniversary of its founding, she was greeted by crowds of hospital leper patients who remembered Horder's contributions.

The occupational therapy practiced in the Leper Asylum was adopted as a treatment regimen by C.M.S. missionaries; at the leprosy settlement in Purulia, missionaries encouraged leper patients to learn agriculture, carpentry, bricklaying, and even dressmaking to promote their recovery. A generation of new missionaries, including Leopold G. Hill and Hubert Gordon Thompson, also served at the Pakhoi hospital.

In 1936, the Leper Asylum closed after 50 years of operation due to a lack of sufficient space to treat an influx of new patients. Pressure from the local government, which was concerned that the proximity of leper patients to the city would present a "menace to public health and safety", also forced the closure. Instead, patients from the asylum were moved to a new leper settlement four miles (6.4 km) south-west of Pakhoi.

The remainder of the hospital, which remained intact, acquired the Mandarin name Poyan–or Puren–Hospital, or the "Hospital of Universal Love", reflecting its work in treating the local people. In 1952, this name was changed to "Beihai People Hospital".

== Return to England and later life ==
In August 1906, Horder and his wife returned to England because of their failing health, leaving the hospital under the direction of missionary doctor Neville Bradley. Though they meant to depart for the Pakhoi mission station upon their recovery, they decided to remain in England after being advised that Beihai's tropical climate would damage their health.

After resigning from the C.M.S. "on health grounds" in February 1908, Horder was appointed the Superintendent of the Boys' Home at Farningham. He died in November of that year.

After Horder's death, Stubbs remained active in the CMS, organizing exhibitions and training missionary assistants.
