= Oliver Allison =

English Christian missionary (1908-1989)

The Right Reverend Oliver C. Allison CBE
- Bishop of the Sudan
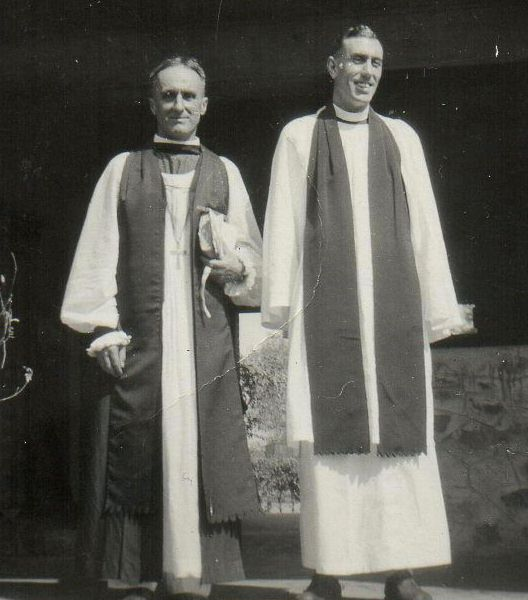
- Reverends Oliver Allison (right) and Morris Gellsthorpe, 1948
- Appointed: 1952
- Term ended: 1974
- Predecessor: Morris Gelsthorpe

Orders
- Ordination: 1933

Personal details
- Born: 28 May 1908 Stafford, England
- Died: 7 June 1989 (aged 81)
- Denomination: Anglican
- Education: Dean Close School; Queens' College, Cambridge

Oliver Claude Allison CBE (28 May 1908 – 7 June 1989) was a Christian missionary and the Bishop of the Sudan for over 20 years in the second part of the 20th century.

== Life ==
Educated at Dean Close School, Cheltenham and Queens' College, Cambridge, he was ordained in 1933 and began his ecclesiastical career with a curacy in Boscombe.

1932-36 Curate at Christ Church Fulwood (Sheffield) Also Scout Master of the 142nd Sheffield (Fulwood) Scout Troop for same dates.

1936-38 Youth Secretary to Winchester Diocese

1938 Accepted by Church Missionary Society (CMS) and left for Anglo Egyptian Sudan. He began what was to be along association with the Sudan by becoming a Missionary in Juba followed by a stint as Assistant Bishop of the diocese. Elevated to the Episcopate

1947 Became Mission Secretary for Sudan.

1948 Consecrated Bishop, to be the assistant Bishop to Rt Rev Morris Gelsthorpe who was the first Bishop of the new diocese of Sudan, no longer linked with Egypt, but still under the Archbishopric of Jerusalem.

1953 Became Diocesan Bishop on Gelsthorpe's retirement. His pastoral duties extended to oversight of Churches in Yemen, Aden, Eritrea, Ethiopia & Samaliland.

1955 Consecration of first Sudanese Assistant Bishop.

1956-1972 Unrest in Sudan.

1972 Peace talks culminated in the Addis Ababa Agreement in which the South was promised autonomy from the North. A few missionaries were allowed to return.

1974 Retired. When back in England he did a lot of work to help through the Sudan Church Association.

Returning to England he often preached about his eventful life at parishes who wanted to know more about the region

Allison died on 7 June 1989, at the age of 81.
