= Francis Spring Walker =

British Army medical officer (1876–1941)

Francis Spring Walker CBE FRCS
- Born: 6 January 1876; Glanbehy, County Kerry, Ireland
- Died: 24 June 1941 (aged 65) Caragh Lake, County Kerry, Ireland
- Allegiance: United Kingdom
- Branch: British Army
- Service years: 1900-1922
- Rank: Lieutenant-Colonel
- Conflicts: Second Boer War; First World War
- Awards: Commander of the Order of the British Empire, Mention in Dispatches

Lieutenant-Colonel Francis Spring Walker CBE (6 January 1876 – 24 June 1941) was a British Army officer.

He was educated at Dean Close School, Cheltenham. He received his diploma for Licentiate Midwifing from the Royal College of Surgeons of Ireland in 1898. He was also educated at Trinity College, Dublin.

He was commissioned into the Royal Army Medical Corps on 25 April 1900 and served in the Second Boer War in the Orange River Colony and Cape Colony from June to December 1900 before being invalided.

Between 1902-03, when his health broke down and he had to go on half-pay for 8 months, and 1905-1908 he served in India and was promoted to Captain 25 April 1903. He was stationed at Ferozepore in 1908. He was promoted to Major 25 April 1912. With the outbreak of the First World War in 1914, Spring Walker sailed to France with the 16th Field Ambulance of the British Expeditionary Force on 11 September 1914, where he served until 15 January 1915 when he was invalided.

On 17 February 1915, he was Mentioned in Dispatches for the first time. He served in the Gallipoli Campaign as a medical officer in command of the Hospital Carrier Vladivian at Suvla Bay and Malta 1915-16 as O.C. No. 3 Convalescent Camp, Ghain Tuffeyh, Malta.

Back in the UK he was the O.C. Military Hospital, Taunton and Military Hospital Cork.

He was promoted to Lieutenant-Colonel 26 December 1917.

On 3 June 1919, he was decorated as a Commander of the Order of the British Empire. On 10 and 29 July that same year, he was Mentioned in Dispatches for a second and third time. He retired from the army in May 1920, but remained on the officer reserve list until 1922. He returned to County Cork, Ireland, where he died in 1941.
