= Wellesley Tudor Pole =

British spiritualist

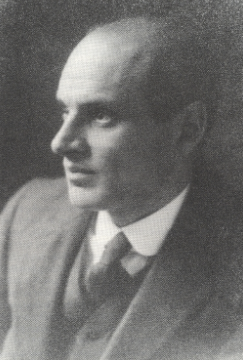
- Born: 23 April 1884; Weston-super-Mare
- Died: 13 September 1968 (aged 84); Hurstpierpoint
- Occupations: Baháʼí; spiritualist
- Spouse: Francis Snelling (m. 1912)
- Children: 3

Wellesley Tudor Pole OBE (23 April 1884 – 13 September 1968) was an English Baháʼí, psychic, spiritualist and activist for vegetarianism.

Pole authored many pamphlets and books and was a lifelong pursuer of religious and mystical questions and visions, being particularly involved with the Baháʼí Faith and a quest for the Holy Grail of Arthurian Legend. He founded the Silent Minute campaign which was followed internationally. Late in life he resuscitated the Trust running the Chalice Well.

The musician and actor Edward Tudor-Pole is a grandson.

== Biography ==
=== Born and raised ===
Wellesley Tudor Pole was raised with stories of elders and understandings of French kin Edmund de la Pole, 3rd Duke of Suffolk and English and Welsh kin Owen Tudor. Pole was born 23 April 1884, in Weston-super-Mare, son of Thomas Pole and Kate Wansborough. Pole was confirmed in the Anglican Church but the family understood this to mean the Broad church which had liberal respect for many religious ideas and of being uncritical of various apparent contradictions. His father was interested in Fabian socialism, theosophy, (probably Boehmian Theosophy) the Garden city movement and the whole family were involved in Spiritualism. Kate claimed the Tudor ancestry.

Pole briefly attended Dean Close School in Cheltenham for less than one year. He was educated at Blundell's School, where he later wrote of being unprepared for going to boarding school and had a child's visions and awareness of stories of reports of psychics. He reported school was a terrible experience with bullies and brutes. His sister described him as having a difficult childhood, not understood. At 11 years of age he felt relatively independent of family - "I am not a chattel" he recalled remarking. A rich elder friend Robert McVitie whom he felt as a kindred spirit quietly offered his parents to adopt him at age 14,(1898) but was denied, for which Pole later felt would have made a much better circumstance.

Nevertheless at the age of 20, instead of going to college, he found himself managing director of the family business in 1904.

=== Glastonbury and the cup ===
Pole's life of experiencing visions took its first lasting step forward in 1902. That year he had a serious illness with some kind of vision. Whether that experience or another, he also later claimed having vivid dreams of being a monk at Glastonbury which inspired a strong enough interest for him to visit there that year and had further experiences that led to further trips "to gain inspiration" and spoke of it as a pilgrimage. In light of later developments it may be interesting to take note of Thomas Breakwell who died in Paris in 1902.

Ultimately a cup was found about which there was much inquiry and news coverage. Pole and his assistants recounted the whole affair as they knew it before a group in July 1907 including Archdeacon of Westminster Basil Wilberforce saying "He may be deluded himself but one thing is perfectly certain, that he is not going to attempt to delude you." In the early 20th century there was a porous relationship between liberal Christianity and esoteric or spiritualist ideas, eastern philosophies, social causes, and eastern religions. Over 40 "high status" individuals were at this meeting to discuss the cup and Pole's and assistants experiences. These 40 can be thought of as a spectrum of interests in this milieu inside and outside mainstream Christianity when they met - some of them leaders in that discourse of ideas like Pole who can be summed up as a centrepiece of a 'Celtic' network (in the sense of Celtic by connotation and reputation, though not history,) and Albert Basil Wilberforce who was a leader among the more Christian elements though with clear proclivity to associate with other kinds of religiosity.

The story was recounted for the group. In later 1904 Pole had a feeling of a pending discovery to be made in Glastonbury that "would link the founder of the Christian faith with modern leaders of Christian thought" and left word to watch for such a discovery with the Roman Catholic College priest there. "Pole was inspired by the idea that a pre-Christian culture had existed in Ireland which had extended itself to Glastonbury and Iona, and which was the repository of an authentic Western mystical tradition, the true roots of spiritual life in the West.… Still, his pursuits also blended identification with the 'mystic East', with interest in Hermeticism, Theosophy and Spiritualism. In some respects, Tudor Pole's pursuits mirror the activities of those promoting the 'Celtic Revival' in Ireland during this period, though a distinct alterity in their worldview is acknowledged."

In Pole's second visit he envisioned "three maidens" who would help in the "work" in Glastonbury and had brought his sister Katherine in on successor visits there. Then in 1905 he added two friends to the interest and trips - Allen sisters who went in early September and another 11–12 November - during the latter of which one had a vision of a woman's hand raising a cup out of a stream and returned. Then Pole envisioned a specific spot while at a business meeting in Bristol and was able to send the Allen sisters the same day to the particular spot - they had been there a couple times previous. There amidst some 3 feet of water and another couple feet of mud they found a cup but decided it was too sacred for them to handle so they washed it and left it in the water. 1 October 1906, Pole was able to send his sister on a chill rainy day to get it and brought it to their Clifton house in Bristol. This well was the "St. Bride's Well", (a reference to Saint Brigid of Kildare,) a kind of Holy well.

Pole began to consult with people about the cup but also to entertain the visionary experiences of others that appeared to link with his own and led to Pole's quest. In mid-December Pole consulted with Annie Besant (president of British Theosophy Society the next year,) as well as the British Museum and South Kensington Museum and Swedish Princess Karadja who connected him with Helena Humphreys who from then was much involved with the quest. She felt it was a cup from the Last Supper and handed toward Peter which was kept by a woman attendant and then felt the cup had migrated to a European Church in between until finally at the ruins of Glastonbury. They had this meeting in January 1907. Pole also had felt something important about a "Church somewhere on the Continent" as well.

Pole also consulted with A. E. Waite who confirmed it had some characteristics of the Holy Grail, details of which were linked with the legend of King Arthur in the vision of Sir Percival of it. However later in September Waite disavowed the cup as the Holy Grail itself.

In fall 1906 and again in spring 1907 Pole consulted with medical doctor and collector John Goodchild who slowly unfolded his story. Goodchild claimed to have bought it in 1887, that his father had claimed it with a sense of importance, and following a vision in Paris in 1897 and the death of his father (who sent it back by courier) decided to leave it in a well in Glastonbury. Goodchild's Paris vision indicated that his 'visitor' "came to you at very great danger to myself to tell you…", which may be the first indication of ideas of a threatening conditions among the discarnate. Goodchild tried to watch out for its future discovery and even brought a woman friend to the well hoping for it to be discovered. Goodchild had had visionary experiences in August/September 1906 and as a result sent Pole a letter with a drawing of one of his visions - a vision of a cup with five stars - to be passed on to whomever "the pilgrims who have just been to Glastonbury" were and was there in late September when the Allen sisters returned after their original find of the cup though he did not relate his history with the cup to them but was very enthusiastic of their find. Pole and his sister then visited Goodchild in late September but shared only part of the story. Pole never did find any confirming evidence of Goodchild's statements on the history of the cup. Of the origin, placing, and recovery of the cup, some processes and timings have been associated with Celtic and mystical thought and may have been a paradigm by which both Pole and Goodchild may have had a common framework of thinking. But the importance observed with respect to the cup was seen amidst ideas of matriarchal background of Ireland via Goodchild compared to a more Arthurian context for Pole.

23 June 1907, Pole showed the cup to the archdeacon of Westminster, who invited then visitor Samuel Clemens, who remarked upon it, and then to a group of notables 20 July including George Howard, 9th Earl of Carlisle, Henry Pelham-Clinton, 7th Duke of Newcastle, Charles Wood, 2nd Viscount Halifax, Reginald John Campbell, William Crookes and Oliver Lodge, and Whitelaw Reid, who gathered at home of Basil Wilberforce.

Along with reporting on the visionary experiences leading to the finding of the cup, Pole reported other visionary experiences which he claimed as prophecies. These were "received instructions" while awake and not through a seance:

- There would be "definite tangible proof" connecting the cup to Jesus.
- The cup will return to Glastonbury and the area would become a cite of physical and spiritual healing and advance the idea it was the place of the first touch of Christianity to the land - see Myths and legends of Glastonbury.
- Pole warned of "a Divine outpouring of the Holy Spirit in the world… and… great intelligences… preparing channels through which this Divine power, this second coming, this great outpouring of the Holy Ghost, shall be manifested," which, conditionally, could be a channeled by and magnify church unity and the high position of Britain, but if not it would "no longer remain the great nation she is, and the centre of the world will be transferred to a very different country" and "other agencies will be found". And a signal event in this process and a kind of deadline for that condition of unity was going to be in 1911 when "those who have been watching and preparing the way for the second coming will recognize a great teacher who will be here and will be recognized by a few in that year. The great teacher will be a woman and recognized by those who are, as I say, preparing the way, by a seven pointed star that will be worn on her forehead.…[but] not be recognized by official Christianity…."

The prophecies were envisioning a rebirth of Christian unity among the islands of Great Britain and a rival to the Roman Catholic Lourdes site, but if unity could not be achieved another situation would be found and another country take the fore in the world.

The cup became very well-known and is still commented upon in a variety of contexts.

Wilberforce accepted the cup as the Holy Grail. Pole claimed it was at one time in the possession of Jesus and provided the opportunity for a new wider religious framework in terms of respect for geography as well as a breadth of ideas which later were taken up as a theme of New Age thought. The fact that newspaper accounts validating the seriousness of the proceedings and reception of the claim is argued to fit into this being not just about a curio but about a meeting of ideas including but not dominated by differences of ideas.

The meeting had been meant to be quiet and private among the group but it was published in the newspaper a week later. Indeed it was carried in the news internationally.

Though the cup was soon understood by most to be too modern and Wilberforce's enthusiasm for it caused complications with his superiors, Wilberforce continued his associations and investigations of religious connectivity. For Pole the meeting introduced him to a higher profile of engagement with the exchange of ideas.

Pole and his sisters and supporters began to host the cup in the upper room of his home in Bristol and called it "the Oratory" which is a small chapel, especially for private worship.

In this period of activity around the cup various visions developed among Pole and others who became associated with it. Leslie Moore was in South Africa in March 1907 and had a vision news would come in late July of a remarkable find. She sailed for England in June and stayed with a friend, Miss Hoey, and learned of the coverage and "find" and let Pole know of her experiences before the end of July that she had had visions of papers which would give an account of the cup. She envisioned what seemed to her a large Catholic Church with a priest in red vestments when there was loud banging on the doors and people became afraid. An acolyte then escaped through a tunnel system which led to a chapel with a scroll and the cup and then he left with the cup along further tunnels coming out into a church ruin. She wrote to her friend who sent it on to Pole and he send a telegram asking her to come visit him in London. She, Miss Hoey, and Helena Humphreys gathered. There Pole identified the Church as the Church of San Sophia, a part of the Hagia Sophia complex in Constantinople. This encounter solidified Pole's sense of a quest.

Another who became involved was Alice Buckton. She attended the Wilberforce meeting and then to the oratory in late September 1907, and later went on pilgrimage to see ʻAbdu'l-Bahá, then leader of the Baháʼí Faith, in early 1910 while Pole went that winter. Buckton went on to buy the Chalice Well in 1913 which would later host the cup. Wilberforce and Buckton were among those later close to the religion.

=== Constantinople and the quest ===
Initially his quest was for textual proof of the cup, but also of the mystical heritage of Christianity and a framework or gateway to engaging in a wider unity especially in Christianity but beyond too including other Celtist investigations. Thus with the mediumship inputs Pole set out for Constantinople.

==== First trip ====
Pole's first attempt leaving for Constantinople came at the end of August, 1907. There he gained access to the gardens around the church but was stymied by a slab of marble blocking a tunnel but then there had visions of finding a lost library of Emperor Justinian, which would be a very significant factor the rest of his life in the quest. By 1 October he began to speculate of worldly powers becoming interested in his search.

Pole had left Constantinople before the Muslim observance of Ramadan which was across the mid-October into November that year. On his return and amidst crowds now visiting the oratory, the three ladies warned Pole in of his assistant while he was in Constantinople, but he didn't agree with some of the visions of the ladies which became stronger after he returned.

==== Second trip ====
Pole left on his second trip back to the Church of San Sophia in later 1907 in disguise and would stay into early 1908. He later described an incident he claimed of an attempted poisoning, and of attempting to murder him. He further explored tunnels but it was unsafe and turned his attention to a possible entrance along the coast. No excavation or access was allowed amidst the time and his position as a foreigner.

While there he also learned of the Baháʼí Faith and particularly of ʻAbdu'l-Bahá. Pole was "much impressed by the fact that Abdul-Baha could exert such an influence from within prison walls. When I returned to London I found that very little was known of the movement, and I determined to visit Abdul-Baha, … and discover for myself the secret of his power." It has been claimed that he learned this from early Baháʼí Stanwood Cobb who was teaching at Robert College in Constantinople after converting to Baháʼí Faith 1906 at Green Acre.

Now returned to the UK, the group or Pole decided access to the oratory was cut off from January 1908 to September 1910. More experts met about the cup late in January as well and they generally felt it was not ancient yet it was still bringing people together from east and west. Further trips were complicated by the intensifying tensions to the region: the whole situation is seen as part of The Great Game from earlier that coalesced into the Young Turk Revolution in July 1908. Early Baháʼí Sidney Sprague visiting from America met with Pole in London answering questions as well as literature he could share. Pole later also mentions reading the report of orientalist E. G. Browne meeting Baháʼu'lláh.

==== Third attempt ends at ʻAbdu'l-Bahá ====
In 1908 Pole left for a third attempt on the quest amidst the visions and prophecies and experiences he had had. This time he was going to start from the southern Mideast to see museums for comparable evidence about the cup but started with wanting to meet ʻAbdu'l-Bahá who by then was in Alexandria, Egypt. ʻAbdu'l-Bahá was freed from political arrest in September.

Pole later reported an anecdote from the trip. On the way to meeting ʻAbdu'l-Bahá he had an encounter with a sheikh who thoughtfully observed a problem with imperialism: "A traveller walking through the streets of a town came across a house with its windows broken and its doors askew. Inside the house everything was in turmoil. He went into the house, and finding the owner, said to him, 'Your house requires putting in order, it is full of disorder. May I call my servants and put things straight for you?' The owner accepted the offer, so the traveller then called in his attendants and set the house in order. Having done this, he built a hut in the garden outside the house, and turning to the owner, said 'This is a very nice house; now it has been spring-cleaned it is in beautiful order, and I and my servants will inhabit it; you can go into the hut and live there, but I will take possession of your house and administer it in my own way and for my own ends." which he then shared in 1914.

Pole arrived to meet with ʻAbdu'l-Bahá, and the translator for the meeting might have been Shoghi Effendi, one of ʻAbdu'l-Bahá's grandsons, who acted as translators. At their next meeting ʻAbdu'l-Bahá said Pole was to soon return instead of going forward with search, and when Pole adjusted his plans, a bit confused but willing to obey, ʻAbdu'l-Bahá asked him to bring long a package of money for a Persian student in Paris with eye trouble - without address or any specific contact information and Pole feeling the money could have been wired more efficiently than delivered by him. But Pole indeed did find him by chance after several searches failed. Pole reported he arrived home in time to avoid personal and business catastrophe. However odd this was for him, Pole was noted for his in-stride acceptance of 'miracles'.

=== Back in the UK ===
By 1909 Pole felt that "tremendous events were about to take place" of the "great onrushing of the Breath of God" seen as "this great Wave" that had "reached the border of our human consciousness and had begun to penetrate it." But there was also visions of a "war in the Air" of the realm of the discarnate. He also began to speak at meetings such as at Colston Hall in Bristol in May about vegetarianism, and was elected president of the Bristol Vegetarian Society by December.

In 1910 resumption of access to the cup started and Pole and the ladies assisting took the cup to the island of Iona to revive the place as a spiritual centre.

Pole began to collect anecdotes of visionary experiences he ultimately published in The Silent Road much later in 1960, and the article "The Mastery of the Citadel" which was published first in 1915 and then again in 1966. Pole also wrote a letter to the Christian Commonwealth on the "Brotherhood of Man" which led interest of other seekers who joined the Baháʼí Faith. In June Pole met Robert Felkin who later also joined the Baháʼí Faith as well.

In June Pole could not make meetings of the Vegetarian Society and in August he spoke in Herefordshire on healing the body by spiritual means. About the same time Pole met Neville Meakin who was a senior member of a group spun off from the fragmentation of the Hermetic Order of the Golden Dawn who hoped Pole would become a successor heir. Meakin attended the oratory in September went on to meet with ʻAbdu'l-Bahá several times. However Meakin died in 1912 unable to finish the stages of initiation of the group for Pole and such interests for Pole, such as they were, ended. In September visitors from India involved in the Brahmo Samaj movement came to see the cup in the oratory and felt it was bringing a chance for mystical awareness across people of different beliefs. At other times the ladies associated with the cup and the oratory performed baptisms and weddings though without the labels of being priests or priestesses.

Meanwhile Pole went on to meet with ʻAbdu'l-Bahá again in late 1910 in Egypt and sent a letter to Scotland with second had reports from ʻAbdu'l-Bahá of a prediction of a World War in light of the anticipated Armageddon of the Book of Revelation and beyond to the generality of the 20th century. Writer Patrick Benham related Pole learning of ʻAbdu'l-Bahá only in 1910 through Archdeacon Wilberforce. Pole felt a healing presence and a confirmation of ʻAbdu'l-Bahá "as a world teacher" (in the words of writer Patrick Benham.) Pole went on to then have his own visions of the same ideas of this foretold conflict after returning home. Pole's mirrored vision started as a depressing foreboding starting with "mighty winds" and "strange… perfect silence. A sound of thunder followed, so indescribable and so terrible that it seemed as if the world would be rent to pieces. The thunder passed, and the hill was bathed in quiet light, and I became aware of a mighty Presence standing beside me, full of strength and illumination.…(which) made me comprehend the significance of many events that were to transpire…." Pole spoke to the London Baháʼís about ʻAbdu'l-Bahá and repeated his 1911 prophecy ideas on 31 December 1910. The Baháʼís also managed a "Higher Thought Centre" in London in 1910, and a "Bahai Press" in 1911.

After 1910 Pole felt he was a member of a "group working in Borderland (ed - between the normal consciousness of people and that of the discarnate peoples) in preparation for the descent and control of the new spiritual currents that were to leaven human thought and ideas…", which may or may not be the group that would identify the "great teacher" woman with the star.

==== ʻAbdu'l-Bahá ====
Across earlier 1911 there are various newspaper reports of Pole. January 1911 Pole appeared before the Bath Theosophical Society on behalf of the Baháʼís, in June at Clifton House he presided while Alice Buckton spoke at the meeting, then himself in early July on situations in Egypt, in August on the equality of women and men, and mention of ʻAbdu'l-Bahá coming in mid-September. and also had exchanged telegrams with ʻAbdu'l-Bahá while attending a theosophy summer meeting in August. Pole lived with his parents and sister at the residence. Pole presented for ʻAbdu'l-Bahá at the Universal Races Congress in 1911.

Upon ʻAbdu'l-Bahá's arrival, his translated talk was read by Pole at the City Temple Church, and also spoke at a number of theosophical meetings, and then ʻAbdu'l-Bahá stayed at Pole's home in Bristol; the home acted as a centre offering themed weekend retreats and a visit to the oratory housing the cup. Two kinds of reports exist of the visit - in one ʻAbdu'l-Bahá went to every room and blessed it and in another he blessed the cup itself in silence, (rather differently than other blessings he offered - compare with recorded affirmations of things like Bible.) The second version is not publicized in Baháʼí works. ʻAbdu'l-Bahá visit started 27 September 1911 - and the location is known as the Clifton Guest House next to Pole's own home. A collection of records of talks and information has been published of his visits to Bristol, along with a variety of efforts across time. Early Baháʼí Lady Blomfield's daughters and a couple of others assisted in the comfort of the guests during the visit as well as taking notes and managing appointments.

Pole's biographer Gerry Fenge interprets Pole's prophecy of the "great teacher" as ʻAbdu'l-Bahá though not a woman or with a visible 7 pointed star on his forehead. A correspondent with Fenge has interpreted the vision of a woman with stars as the divine Maiden who was guiding ʻAbdu'l-Bahá.

While ʻAbdu'l-Bahá went back to Egypt for the winter, in early 1912 Pole was again visible in some newspaper accounts. In February 1912 Pole lectured in Gloucestershire, a meeting in Bristol in May, and a Clifton House initiative in June, before going to London in early August shortly before getting married in later August, One of the Allen sisters moved away and married in April. Pole's sister Mary had married in February 1911. Pole was amidst running the Clifton Guest House 1909-1914. A talk of Pole's made the news over in America in June.

In October he had thought out wider ideas of conspiracies that might be in league against him finding Christian manuscripts, the original quest. He prepared detailed ideas for returning to Constantinople but was unable to get away. And met and developed a deep friendship with Scottish businessman David Russell who himself warned Pole that he was convinced the "mental and other conditions" influenced visions and understandings of mediums and intuitive ideas one might have; a kind of "open-minded scepticism" which could be affected by senses of divided loyalties. Indeed ʻAbdu'l-Bahá sometimes separates dreams and visions into three categories: true, interpretative, and confused. At least some of this guidance was related circa 1908 in a widely disseminated Some Answered Questions. The first do not need interpretation but depend on having, according to ʻAbdu'l-Bahá in the words of Necati Alkan, "a heart rid of all attachment and there must not exist idle thoughts in the mind." The second can be decoded for the truth, and the third only reflect "the strife and contention" of the experiencer. According to ʻAbdu'l-Bahá, the work of decoding the second type is like, in Necati Alkan's words, "if you add any color to a white cloth, it will accept it; but if you add blue to a yellow cloth, it will become green and the truth is distorted. In order to have the true colour, one needs to remove the added colour." Indeed, sometimes ʻAbdu'l-Bahá notes such experiences can mean the opposite of what they seem. and Ricky Bradshaw, who experienced a deep near death experience, when asked if such an experience was key to gaining enlightenment, said: "Having a near-death experience does not make you enlightened. It is an introduction, perhaps more a hindrance than a help!"

ʻAbdu'l-Bahá returned again visiting the Poles now married, after coming from America, in early January, 1913. He also spoke at more theosophical meetings in Britain.

Pole had ideas that ʻAbdu'l-Bahá might travel to Russia, Turkestan and India in the coming year or so and unlikely to travel west again. Pole was with ʻAbdu'l-Bahá in France in 1913 and heard him foretell of the War followed some day in the future by the Most Great Peace. His and Florence' first child Jean was born in the oratory in 1914.

=== War time ===
In May Pole writes of an experience of being called to help "frigid souls" who had just died ("drowned") and were lost and feeling terrorized; he wanted to get better at aiding newly dead individuals.

In early July Pole had bought a ticket for Constantinople but with the brewing war the plan did not go forward. In August he writes of feeling layers of the warfare "in the intermediary spheres" was ending and that the newly dead were having an easier time transitioning as if "…some great edict has gone forth…".

Pole wrote of his understanding of Baháʼí ideas of Armageddon prophecy in September to another long associated with the religion - Mrs. Jane Whyte - also called a theosophist, who also hosted ʻAbdu'l-Bahá and was the receiver of the tablet Seven Candles of Unity.

In November Pole published publicly about his ideas of the troubles of the War:

All nations that look upon brute force as worthy of worship must share the blame for what has led to the present crisis. Superficially it would appear that Germany has plunged the world into war. But if we look back into the past few centuries we shall see that nearly all the countries of Europe are responsible, among them Great Britain, and therefore they must all share the responsibility for the situation now developing.… We must remember that Germany is to a large extent only attempting to copy Great Britain…. We cannot afford to throw stones, but as a nation should endeavour to cultivate a little humility."

And then spoke in London on the theme "Some Deeper Aspects of the Great War" and available in earlier 1915.

Whatever reprieve he felt was going on in worlds of consciousness, in later 1914 Pole begins to speak of visions of 'Conflict in the Air' for the War in Heaven of the battle of St. Michael and others - terminology that he grew in use across decades - and also to write a point of view expression of the battles. These experiences were gathered from about 1915 and published in his first book Private Dowding along with what he felt were the personal experiences of that person.

In March 1916 he spoke at the Higher Thought Centre in London, but felt it went badly and that he should take a vow of silence and was depressed. In March he volunteered for military service though he could have sought a release from service as he had a company that sold biscuits to the military. While thus occupied his sister Katherine was the keeper of the cup.

A year later in March 1917 he felt the presence of a soldier but it was not a communication yet, and in August he began a process of automatic writing and this together with earlier work resulted in the book Private Dowding. The book also discussed a Baháʼí-informed spiritualist paradigm of engagement with the world and of revivals of existing religions. A notebook was also begun recording experiences of being of assistance to the newly dead by giving them a mental environment to aid them in their transition. He was noted away from the Vegetarian Society meeting in June.

==== Volunteer ====
In September he started as an officer's candidate in the Royal Marines and was assigned as a 2nd lieutenant in the 3rd company of the Cheshire Regiment. Pole participated in some meetings in Bristol in June/October 1917. In October Pole also experienced opposition from a business partner in his visibility in reporting his psychic experiences. At first he thought he was going to France but come November he knew was going to Egypt and already was anxious about the safety of ʻAbdu'l-Bahá. Pole's family and friends gathered in November for the send-off but also had family vision experiences where Mary led and Pole followed including that various "Masters" would speak to him and he was under 'special protection' and 'consecrated' and his family would also be protected and told by a 'master' in the discarnate world "…you are to be made known to those who serve me in the world. I am going to initiate you into great mysteries. Fail not in your task, because upon you depends the successful accomplishment of a great mission." However, similar to his experience going to school, going to military training became a more intense period of suffering. He began to carry on a correspondence with social leaders who had previously been interested in his activities. His military superiors took note, he gave up exemption from service, then learned he was on personal terms with superiors in the government and society and began to fawn on him somewhat - fixing things that should have been fixed but were only attended to because he was there.

Initially he served with the Devons mostly on after-battle salvaging sometimes under starry skies. A conversation Pole had with a friend anticipated his death and became the basis of the Silent Minute published circa 1940. Pole was wounded in the attack of occupied Jerusalem in early December. His friend did get killed as was his aide. He had no support in the hospitalization and was a bit hysterical too. Following this Pole was assigned to Military Intelligence and soon was alerted to the threat to ʻAbdu'l-Bahá - by the end of December was sending letters along multiple channels of concern to those with access to the government. Letter campaigns addressed concerns through secondaries to the British Cabinet which began to arrive towards the end of January. In February 1918 Pole was assigned to Allenby's office and then became director of the Occupied Enemy Territory Administration. Several lines of actions had brought the matter to the fore by mid-February. This was confirmed from intelligence gathering in March. Orders from the Cabinet that included Lord Curzon and Lord Lamington led to the order to Allenby for the protection of ʻAbdu'l-Bahá and his family. Curzon had also written about the Babí-Baháʼí history in Persia, and Lamington had met ʻAbdu'l-Bahá. Pole was promoted to captain in April.

Battle plans were worked through the summer, and Pole was in a position to also act as a host to various meetings including Zionist activists though he himself was too busy with work to do much with them into June but about this time had a vision of a "visiting" discarnate doctor ministering to his sad condition and an herb was prescribed, found, and bettered him.

Some of Allenby's soldiers were moved to France and Indian soldiers replaced them to which were added some planes and bombs in September: and two Ottoman armies were destroyed in the Battle at Megiddo, and through the Battle of Haifa Mysore Lancers were dispatched to protect ʻAbdu'l-Bahá and family, having entered Haifa 23 September 1918, a date still commemorated. Word of the rescue of ʻAbdu'l-Bahá spread. The experience has been novelized.

Pole was promoted to major in November. He told his staff to mind the Day and change in history - he was then in Jerusalem and in a little more than a week was in Haifa and then a 2.5-hour drive in a horse carriage to Akka to see ʻAbdu'l-Bahá. Pole later describes being with ʻAbdu'l-Bahá at Baháʼí Shrines "…on Mount Carmel… (and) within the Garden Tomb". He later reported an anecdote:

When I expressed my happiness that the war was over (a "war to end all wars"), the Master looked at me with kind but sorrowful eyes and said that I should live to witness a still greater conflict, one that would largely be fought out "in the air," and that it was only subsequent to this terrible event (or series of events) that the" Most Great Peace" would dawn.

Back at work, government and representatives of Jewish, Christian, and Muslim interests continued arguments which Pole would hear but in off-business hours would regularly lay down to "serve" in distant lands and casually mention it to people and phone people and to give them warnings of events. Pole became close friend of Frederick Leveaux circa 1918 and in the 1930s they explored locations of Goodchild's claim and he long held an account of Pole's trips to Constantinople. He was a Lawyer in Cairo by the end of 1918.

Pole left the army in May 1919 with the OBE in June, and Pole wrote an article on ʻAbdu'l-Bahá for the Palestine News which brought widespread interest locally.

=== Back in the UK ===
==== New business and interests… and the quest ====
Pole was returned to England in June. After returning home he lost or gave up the family business with some relief and he got a letter of commendation from Churchill. Another business optimistically founded that spring/summer of 1919 had the prospect he could manage journalism and commerce branches in the Mideast. In the larger sense, however, writing in December 1920, Pole felt something 'went wrong' after the spring of 1919. The Baháʼís had already had some of the materials of, and in 1919 in New York had a grand gathering on the formal presentation of, the Tablets of the Divine Plan which were about promulgating the religion around the world and in several regions of the United States of America and not the United Kingdom, which was a much more important power in the world at the time, such as those of England, Scotland, Wales, and Ireland as it was then. Pole sent a letter to the convention. That Fall interest in Pole's publishing books about psychic experiences in war was waxing. But the venture of an international journalism and commerce collapsed.

July 1920 Shoghi Effendi arrived in Britain with tablets from ʻAbdu'l-Bahá to Lord Lamington and Pole, though we do not have a statement what they were about. He delivered them at a reception held for his arrival. He also consulted with Pole for places to vacation to obey a request of ʻAbdu'l-Bahá during the early days of his education at Oxford. In his visions Pole believed a new war footing of tension was rising up and cutting people off from the higher worlds especially in the strife in Ireland and Russia, a drawing of inspiration of racial consciousness meant to become wider but failing, and the flow of spiritual awakening was now misdirected and then was cut off in spring 1920: for him examples of this were how things were going with President Wilson, the League of Nations, the Versailles Treaty, the Russian Revolution, and the like all resulting in a halt of the fortunes of the second coming, the dissipation of the envisioned spiritual resources and then they being halted.

In 1921 Pole was acting as Secretary of the Baháʼí community in London. That summer Pole's connections led to him being involved in the process of the independence of Egypt. Shoghi Effendi learned of death of ʻAbdu'l-Bahá in later November at Pole's home, being found fainted next to the telegram.

Meanwhile the second generation of Pole and associates working on visions and the quest was disbanded and a third generation formed this time of men: the lawyer Frederick Leveaux he encountered in Cairo, two Russian asylum seekers came with a revision on the Ouija board approach to contact with the discarnate, and they introduced Pole to a third Russian exile. Amounting to 5 they soon developed an idea that there was a mysterious sixth man to join them in the work. At the same time the group envisioned a change in an old otherworldly 'contact' and a new 'speaker' joined in the messages the group were set on decoding and working with to advance the quest in part for the lost library of materials that would revolutionize Christianity as their part of a worldwide transformation to be achieved.

In March 1922 Shoghi Effendi gathered senior Baháʼís from multiple countries in Haifa to discuss the near term development of the religion. Pole was there. The initial question was whether to directly seek electing the Universal House of Justice which the newly appointed head of the religion, Shoghi Effendi, decided firmly could not happen until there was more work establishing local and national spiritual assemblies first. The separation between Pole and the community was over exactly the question of a movement uniting and rejuvenating the existing religions vs being another religion with its own organization may begin here. Pole declined inclusion on ballot for the election of the Local Spiritual Assembly of London after conversations with Shoghi Effendi and thought he could serve the interests of ʻAbdu'l-Bahá and the Baháʼís to act as a non-Baháʼí though in some ways Baháʼís were perhaps more reluctant to work with him. Pole never criticized the religion or its institutions. Another strain was that Pole was also a firm believer in reincarnation which if defined as the literal return of individual personalities is against the teachings of ʻAbdu'l-Bahá noted as early as 1908 in Some Answered Questions, but this belief also raised questions as Pole soon believed as well: that enemies in the "beyond" could force a discarnate to reincarnate, and the 'opposition' included supposed ancient beings who had been reborn many times which seems to go against the whole paradigm of why reincarnation is claimed to exist.

While the group worked these issues this mysterious sixth member of the group remained unfound over the years and the promised avenues of advancement dried up leaving the 'guides' with a poor reputation in the group. Pole did put together the resources for another trip to Constantinople on the quest in April which investigated the seaside entrance to a possible hidden library but returned home unsuccessful by the end of May. Through these Russian exiles from 1922 Pole began an "Appeal" on behalf of the Russian Clergy in the face of Bolshevist opposition of the Soviets and continued for 12 years. In 1925 he visited Bath. He set up an import/export business but seemed to succeed more connecting with people in all kinds of walks of life and trying to resolve problems, but was not an economic success. Personally the stress of these setbacks and perhaps an illness made him bedridden with a paralyzing condition in later 1923. His economic situation was reduced to surviving by wits instead of returns from investments and occasionally borrowing money from friends by spring of 1924. The quest was put on hold.

Then things began to turn around. There was an Algerian paper investment in later 1924, and in 1925 he entered into business in Italy which then became a successful land management company across a wide area around Gargano, Italy. There he also visited the Sanctuary of Monte Sant'Angelo which was associated with archangel Michael, and Roman Catholic Padre Pio, and was under threat of malaria. There he worked with among others Mussolini in his early days.

Pole's father died in late summer 1926. In December Pole spoke to Spiritualist group in London, and to another group the next year in March.

=== New era of projects and the Silent Minute ===
In time Pole tried to advance three centres of spiritual importance across Britain and Ireland: Glastonbury (associated with Arthurian legend and early Christianity in Britain) Scottish Iona and an as yet uncertain island of Ireland. These three would be a "heart" to be in relation to the "brains" of London, Edinburgh and Dublin. The cup was taken to Glastonbury and Iona. At times Pole and Goodchild and others maintained links with people in the Golden Dawn group and a chance to lead a particular subgroup which didn't come about. Indeed a triad of centres of Baháʼí development did form in the early days of the religion in Britain.

In 1928 Pole undertook going to pilgrimage sites for St. Michael in Europe following interest of Rudolf Steiner connecting Glastonbury and Tintagel. In 1930 Pole was in a business meeting. Some of his Russian contacts themselves developed problems with the Russian clergy from 1930.

In 1931 Pole's quest involved some archeology activity but was not successful. The published biography of Pole largely ends coverage in 1931 so the summarization of Pole's visions and experiences currently ends and the available coverage shifts to more of his public engagements and works.

In 1933 Pole was still visible on behalf of the situation of the Russian clergy, and again in 1935, and in his own words in 1936 with the struggles of what life was like in Russia instead of the propaganda. That year he also founded the company Wellesley Holdings 1936 for waste conversion which was and sold in the 1940s. In 1937 he published on the "shadow doctor" he felt had been assisting him for years.

==== Rejuvenated connection with Baháʼís ====
In 1938 Pole was included in efforts of incorporation of National Spiritual Assembly of Great Britain, the national institution managing the community, and felt free to associate and support Baháʼís in the 1940s. Pole is next found in newspapers in 1940 with the beginning of the promulgation of the Silent Minute, and co-wrote The spiritual front, an issue each one of us must face fairly and squarely with Waldron Smithers. Pole began a consideration of what became called the Silent Minute from 1917 and its success was mentioned by a Nazi official in 1945. Some of that movement went on to become the Lamplighter movement. None of which was commented on by Baháʼís. The call for the Silent Minute expanded and continued. and he toured giving talks too.

Pole had been present at the centenary celebrations of Baháʼís in London in 1944 though still stressing his view that it was a movement vs a separate religion following reconnection that Shoghi Effendi advised in 1943 though Pole's connection with two early regional leaders in Zionist growth of Palestine did not bother Shoghi Effendi. Baháʼís were somewhat visible in newspapers that spring and alittle in the fall while Pole was visible in the fall with the restyled wording of the "Big Ben Minute" for the Silent Minute, and with an offer to seek to repair the Liberty Bell which did not get received well. In 1945 Pole maintained contact with the Baháʼís and who appeared to accept his position of "assist the Cause as a non-member" while Pole continued publicly engaged in the Silent Minute/Big Ben Minute work even after the war.

Pole was on the RMS Queen Elizabeth when it berthed in America in April 1947 but did not disembark. The paperwork listed him as a first-class passenger and as an industrialist born in Somerset. Also, a passport was not listed. He set up an alternative health care services and pharmacy business in 1948.

The final known mention from Shoghi Effendi came in 1949 when he advised the Baháʼís in Britain invite Pole to their events and schools and "show utmost consideration" of him. In 1950-51 Pole wrote two articles mentioning the Baháʼí Faith in an attempt at a scholarly psychic investigations journal. In the first he states:

The primary mission of the Baha'i Faith is to enable every adherent of an earlier World-Faith to obtain a fuller understanding of the religion with which he stands identified and to acquire a clear apprehension of its purpose, which, in our modern world, will involve the emergence of a world-community, the consciousness of world-citizenship and the founding of a universal civilization and culture.

This Revelation is now beginning to demonstrate its right to be recognized not as one more religious system added to the conflicting creeds which for so many generations have divided mankind, but rather as a restatement of the eternal verities underlying all the religions of the past, as a unifying force instilling into the adherents of these religions a new spiritual vigour, and unfolding to their eyes the glorious destiny that awaits the human race.

Both parts of this are close paraphrases of Shoghi Effendi's statements. First in The World Order of Baháʼu'lláh written in 1932: "Its declared, its primary purpose is to enable every adherent of these Faiths to obtain a fuller understanding of the religion with which he stands identified, and to acquire a clearer apprehension of its purpose." And second in a statement to the UN in 1947: "…this Faith is now increasingly demonstrating its right to be recognized, not as one more religious system superimposed on the conflicting creeds which for so many generations have divided mankind and darkened its fortunes, but rather as a restatement of the eternal verities underlying all the religions of the past, as a unifying force instilling into the adherents of these religions a new spiritual vigor, infusing them with a new hope and love for mankind, firing them with a new vision of the fundamental unity of their religious doctrines, and unfolding to their eyes the glorious destiny that awaits the human race." Pole further comments that the pictures of Baháʼu'lláh "give a very poor impression of the stature and dignity of this great being" and felt much the same about ʻAbdu'l-Bahá though he carried a picture of him on his person every day. Of Abdu'l-Bahá he said: "one would instinctively refer to a sense of universalism, permeated with the spirit of deep, loving kindness. Whatever the topic under discussion might be - ranging from religion to the weather, from sunsets to the flowers, from ethics to personality, Abdu'l-Baha always struck the universal note, the note of oneness as between the Creator and all His creation, great or small." In the second article he wrote recalled the anecdotes of being sent to Paris and some details though also that the details are from long ago memories and might have errors.

==== Other projects ====
In 1951 Pole cowrote Prince of Heaven, Captain of the Angelic Hosts about St. Michael. This was also the year his wife Florence died shortly before they both moved to Hurstpierpoint, Sussex. Pole was still identified with the Big Ben Minute in 1951, and in diplomatic circles in 1953. In 1954 his son David began to be mentioned, as well as Pole's support for the stances of President Eisenhower, and the work of Pole in the Big Ben Council and its observance the next years. By around then and probably earlier period Pole joined the Fairy Investigation Society, a semi-secret occult group devoted to collecting evidence and information about the existence of fairies, as well as to organize documented instances of fairy sightings. One of Pole's books, The Silent Road was published in 1960.

==== Later decades involvements ====
In 1958-9 Pole and a group of investors bought the Tor School, and previous Chalice Well lands established by Alice Buckton in 1913, as a replacement and migration of the enthusiasm of original Bride's Well with a substitute "well". Buckton had died in 1944 but her inheritors could not sustain the establishment. Pole re-cast the investment as a Trust with support by subscribers termed "companions" to allow visitors free access to further the aims of claiming Christianity in Britain was based on Joseph of Arimathea coming to the island and his own feeling close to monastic Roman Catholic orders. The process of this new founding made news starting in 1958.

Meanwhile mention of his beliefs in prayer and war was called to mind in 1962 as well as the comment of a Nazi official.

In 1965 he wrote A man seen afar with the assistance of Rosamond Lehmann about the life of Jesus Christ through his visionary experience, and still trying to make sure Winston Churchill was being remembered for the Silent Minute. In 1966 work relative to the Chalice Well was more in the news.

Though it took years, Writing on the Ground was published responding to requests from Baháʼís and remembered ʻAbdu'l-Bahá - and continuing to underscore Pole's claim that Abdu'l-Bahá had envisioned it as a movement and not a religion; as one's own commitment to the "spiritual path". It was published in 1968. Pole and comments about Pole were in the news in 1968, and 1969. In these last years of his life Pole came to a metaphorical understanding of the cup: "Half a century ago, in the Women's Quarter of Glastonbury, form the depths of the Well of St. Bride, a Cup was brought out into the light of day. This vessel is the symbol of the heavenly and eternal Grail, the Chalice of Christ, the Promise of the Future."

Pole died 13 September 1968, after suffering from cancer and often in pain at his home in Hurstpierpoint, Sussex. Pole was cremated and his ashes dispersed at a garden of the Chalice Well in Glastonbury.

== Review and legacy ==
Pole has been seen in a number of contexts. For one he is seen as a progenitor of the New Age development as one of the "contingent collectivities" and "emblem"s which congealed more in the later 1960s with and after Pole's death, as well as being part of the Celtic revival, Theosophy and esotericism of Glastonbury. and in general the theme of Irish Celticism and Pole's work in it has been explored as a de-colonialization theme out of a Catholic/Protestant dynamic which then was influenced by Indian philosophy and Theosophy and origin stories of the Irish peoples though the specific ideas of these varied from Pole's own. "Tudor Pole considered himself 'a Universalist', belonging to 'the Schools of Mysteries', 'conversant with the tenets of the world's philosophies and religions'" "Tudor Pole and his immediate associates 'felt they had inaugurated the Church of the New Age, a church in which woman was in the ascendant and Bride, the Celtic embodiment of the Universal Feminine, was restored and harmonized with a mystical understanding of the Christian faith'." He has been described as a "bricoleur" creating new forms from older ideas. Clearly he had a relationship with the Baháʼí Faith. He has been seen as central to one of the three initial networks of contacts amounting to communities for the Baha'i Faith in the UK - London, the Celtic/Mysticism of Pole and others, and the Manchester groups. Pole's grandson William is a recognized Baháʼí. Pole had a "long career" in applying spiritualism on Christianity, and consistent held priority of Jesus. It is unclear when or if in multiple conversations, but Pole also remarked that he had shared with ʻAbdu'l-Bahá that he understood Jesus to have manifested the "Christ principle" more than any other person and he felt encouraged by ʻAbdu'l-Bahá to not give up on the Christian community but to strive to bring the Baháʼí principles to it as given by Baháʼu'lláh. "It was made clear that the Baha'i Revelation had dawned to bring new light and truth into the world as a leaven for all Faiths and all mankind, and was not to be considered as just one more religious organisation or sect." However Pole maintained a Christian-centricness sense of priority.

Pole visions had been widely accepted generally partly because he was seen as sincere with integrity, and also consistently "normal" rather than putting on airs and sometimes provided enough detail about visions related to friends that they were convinced by the details.

Pole lacked recognition of the Baháʼí appreciation of Mohammed, the Báb, and the claims of Baháʼu'lláh, and had a fundamental misunderstanding about station of ʻAbdu'l-Bahá as Baháʼís. Lil Osborn says he "discovered the Baha'i Teachings through his Quest, not the other way around." Pole held that ʻAbdu'l-Bahá had opposed development of a new religion but refused to take part in any criticism of the institutions of the religion. Writer Patrick Benham takes it further stating Baháʼu'lláh taught "not a new religion, but the initiation of a force to unify existing belief-systems, pointing to the divine origin of every faith." Pole was a trusted senior in the area while Shoghi Effendi was in London, and held in high esteem among Baháʼís in UK and Haifa. However this process of distinguishing the Baháʼís as a religion was not a matter of a secret teaching of ʻAbdu'l-Bahá as was common in other institutions of mystics, a kind of practice Pole was aware of among them. Pole considered himself as a trusted insider who would know of any secret teaching. Instead, Baháʼís see this as just the application of the principle of gradualism and not dictating belief in Pole's case. During his lifetime Baháʼís did not have to give up membership in other churches, and ʻAbdu'l-Bahá himself regularly attended local mosque services in Palestine. Yet about 1940 another Baháʼí, Terah Cowart Smith, was questioned by rabbi Stephen Samuel Wise who felt he knew ʻAbdu'l-Bahá well, asking why in the early days Baháʼís didn't give up such affiliations and that changed. She reviewed the history of religious institutions - "Each dispensation requires a new agency to establish its separate and independent character…. So we wouldn't expect that in the New Baháʼí Era any of the former agencies could serve this major function.… For God's purpose for the time in which we live is the establishment of unity of all the people of the world.… In Baháʼí devotional services the Scriptures of all the World Religions have a part."

Baháʼí institutions have recognized Pole's specific contribution to the rescue of ʻAbdu'l-Bahá. Pole's part in his visit to Britain both times has also been the object of some note among Baháʼís and Pole's main biographer and a documented correspondent have seen it as the fulfillment of one of Pole's own prophecies. Baháʼís mentioned his book Writing on the Ground in 1969, and have collected Baháʼí mentions of his online.

In succeeding decades Pole's views and writings have appeared and reappeared in newspapers, the social media of the day. In 2009 a series of articles of his work were republished in Canada through his foundation. More materials and references have appeared on the internet.

Among Pole's greater achievements late in life was the rescue of the Chalice Well in Glastonbury near a decade before his passing and through he never lived in the town. The Glastonbury cup itself came there in 1969 only after Pole died.

A grandson Edward Tudor-Pole is an English musician, television presenter and actor. Another grandson Edward Tudor-Pole had been advancing a musician trust in Glastonbury since the mid-1990s.

== Bibliography ==
Pole is credited with over 30 articles and books in various editions, reprints, and translations. Some of them are:

Wellesley Tudor Pole (1919). Private Dowding: A Plain Record of the After-death Experiences of a Soldier …. Dodd, Mead.
Wellesley Tudor Pole (January 1960). The Silent Road. Random House. ISBN 978-0-85435-443-6.
Wellesley Tudor Pole; Rosamond Lehmann (1983) [1965]. A Man Seen Afar (revised ed.). Ebury Publishing. ISBN 978-0-85435-085-8.
Wellesley Tudor Pole (1968). Writing on the Ground. Spearman.

== See also ==
- Theosophical Society
- Spiritualist Association of Great Britain
