= Hugh Lamprey =

- Born: 2 August 1928
- Died: 10 February 1996 (aged 67)
- Education: Dean Close School, Cheltenham
- Known for: United Nations Environment Programme report on desertification in the African Sahel region,
- Scientific career
- Fields: Ecology
- Institutions: British Army (tank officer)

Hugh Lamprey (2 August 1928 – 10 February 1996) was a British ecologist and bush pilot. After travelling on student expeditions to Iceland, the Himalayas, and the Canary Islands, he served in Palestine and Egypt as a tank officer. Subsequently he obtained a position in Tanganyika, and in the Game Department in 1953, he designed methods of estimating game densities that are still widely used. He applied these to studies of food sources of Tsetse flies (specifically Glossina swynnertoni) in Kenya. Lamprey was educated at Dean Close School, Cheltenham.

In 1975 he prepared a United Nations Environment Programme report on desertification in the African Sahel region, in which he concluded that "the desert southern boundary has shifted south" by an average of 90 to 100 kilometres (56 to 62 mi) in the preceding 17 years. This statement has been instrumental to the belief that desertification is a great threat to the world and especially Africa.
