= Ian Yeaman =

English solicitor

Sir Ian David Yeaman (20 March 1889 – 28 February 1977) was an English solicitor.

The son of David and Catherine (née Sanger) Yeaman, after schooling at Dean Close School, Cheltenham, he was admitted a solicitor in 1911; having joined the Gloucestershire Regiment in 1914, he was commissioned into the Royal Field Artillery and served in France from 1916 to 1918.

Upon demobilisation, he became a partner at Rickerbys of Cheltenham. He served on the Law Society's council between 1936 and 1964 and was its Vice-President (1956–57) and then President (1957–58), for which service he was knighted in 1958.

He married Anne Doris Wood, the daughter of Sydney George Wood, in 1926 and then had two children before she died in 1975. On the death of her father in 1942, Ian and Anne Yeaman moved to his home, Moat House, Uckington, Gloucestershire.

Sir Ian survived his wife, dying on 28 February 1977. After his death, the house passed to his son, Keith, but he sold it on, having settled with his own family in the Cotswolds.
