= Henry Crowe (RAF officer) =

RAF Air Commodore (1897-1983)

Air Commodore Henry George Crowe MC CBE
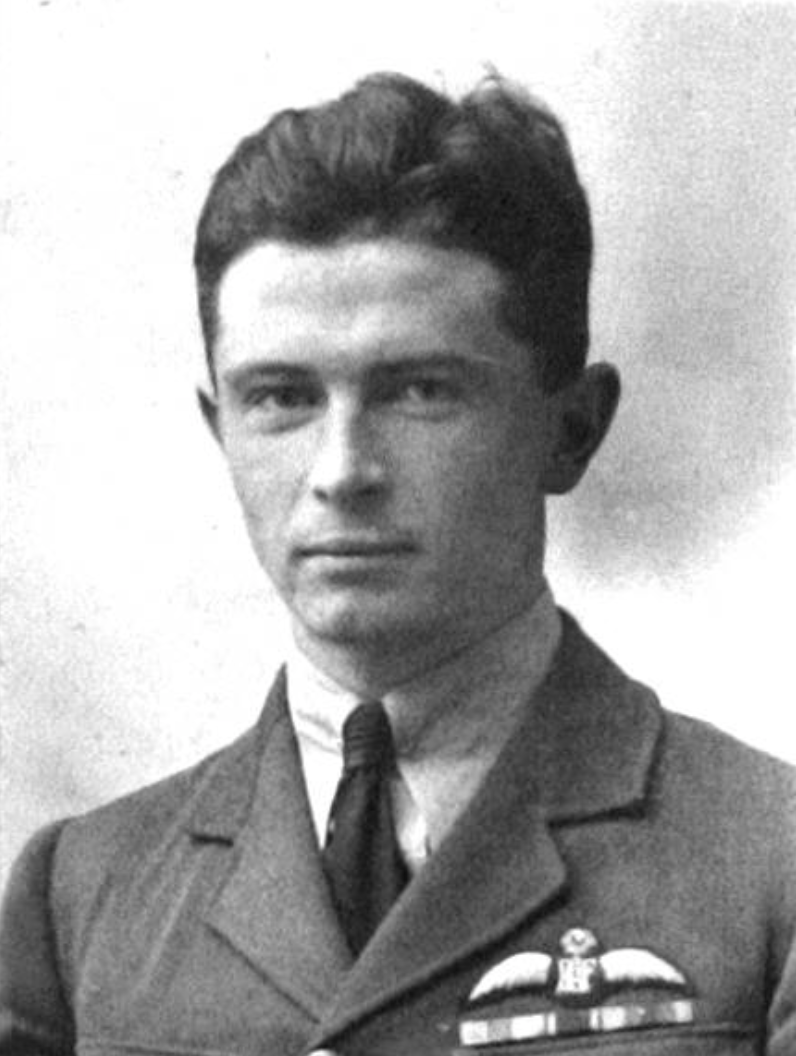
- H.G Crowe
- Born: 11 June 1897; Donnybrook, Dublin, Ireland
- Died: 26 April 1983 (aged 85); Thornton-le-Dale, North Yorkshire
- Military career
- Allegiance: United Kingdom
- Branch: British Army; Royal Air Force
- Service years: 1915–1946
- Rank: Air Commodore
- Nickname: Hal
- Units: Royal Irish Regiment; No. 20 Squadron RAF; No. 106 Squadron RAF; No. 2 Squadron RAF; No. 39 Squadron RAF; No. 14 Squadron RAF
- Commands: No. 23 Squadron RAF; No. 74 Squadron RAF; No. 223 (Composite) Group
- Conflicts: World War I; World War II
- Awards: Order of the British Empire; Military Cross; Order of the Cloud and Banner with Special Cravat (China)

Air Commodore Henry George Crowe MC, CBE (11 June 1897 – 26 April 1983) was a World War I flying ace credited with eight confirmed aerial victories. He also survived being shot down six times in 11 days at one point. His career in the Royal Air Force took him through World War II, during which he ascended to air commodore.

== Early life ==
Crowe became interested in aviation early on, serving as secretary of the school aviation club at St. Helen's School. Although he was born in Ireland, he was educated in England, at Colwyn Bay, Dean Close School and at Cheltenham School in 1911. He returned to Ireland in 1913 for further schooling, attending Trinity College, Dublin as an engineering student. While there, he joined the Officers Training Corps.

== World War I service ==
=== Infantry ===
Henry George Crowe entered the Royal Military College, Sandhurst, as a Gentleman Cadet in November 1915. He graduated from Sandhurst and was commissioned a second lieutenant in the Royal Irish Regiment on 19 July 1916. Crowe joined the Royal Irish at Kemmel.

=== Aviation ===
On 5 September 1917, he was seconded to the Royal Flying Corps as an Observer. He applied for pilot's training at this time, but was refused because of a shortage of observers. He was assigned to No. 20 Squadron RFC in November, and underwent training beginning 28 November 1917.

On 23 January 1918, he was officially assigned to 20 Squadron as a Flying Officer Observer, although he had already jumped the gun and scored his first three victories by then. On 1 April 1918, he was shot down by antiaircraft fire, in a crash that totally destroyed his Bristol F.2 Fighter, but escaped unharmed. On 12 April 1918, he and Douglas Graham Cooke returned from a special mission with their Bristol F.2 Fighter bullet riddled; again, he was unhurt. He was also awarded the Military Cross in April 1918. By 8 May 1918, he had scored five more, and been shot down three times. Manning the guns for Thomas Colville-Jones, Douglas Graham Cooke, or Ernest Lindup, Crowe had destroyed four German planes and driven down four more out of control. He left 20 Squadron having been shot down six times in 11 days, but remained unscathed. By August 1918, he was undergoing pilots training.

== Between the World Wars ==
In April 1919, he was assigned as a pilot in 106 Squadron. Effective 1 August 1919, he was re-seconded for two years to the Royal Air Force as Observer Officer.

Assignment to 2 Squadron as a pilot followed on 1 February 1920, although it was not until 17 February 1921 that he was granted Aviators Certificate #7911. Whilst stationed at Fermoy, County Cork, Crowe had occasion to become involved in military operations in the Munster region, although his official role was to provide lectures to the Army on air cooperation. On 1 August 1921, he was re-seconded again to the RAF, as a flying officer. On 17 November 1921, he was granted a permanent commission as flying officer. Four days later, he transferred to 39 Squadron in Iraq as a pilot.

On 30 June 1922, he was promoted to flight lieutenant. He then received three consecutive photo reconnaissance assignments, covering the next four years. On 17 October 1926, he became a flight commander in 14 Squadron in Amman, Jordan. He began RAF Staff College on 30 December 1928.

On 8 January 1930, he was promoted from flight lieutenant to squadron leader, and spent the next three years as Staff, Deputy Directorate of Organization. The next three years saw him serve as officer commanding of, successively, 23 and 74 Squadrons. He commanded the former at Biggin Hill; the latter, he re-established on Malta during the Abyssinia Crisis of 1935.

On 1 July 1936, he was promoted again, to wing commander. A series of staff assignments followed this.

== World War II ==
The First of January 1940 saw him raised to group captain. The 20th saw him deputy director of war training and tactics. He was promoted to temporary air commodore on 1 June 1941. He shipped out to India in 1942, becoming deputy AOA, HQ Air Forces there on 27 August. From 16 November 1943 through 8 April 1944, he was an acting air vice-marshal with the permanent rank of air commodore.

On 8 June 1944, Air Commodore Henry George Crowe was named to be a Commander of the Order of the British Empire. On 5 October of that year, he took command of No. 223 (Composite) Group at Peshawar, India.

== Post World War II ==
Crowe retired from the RAF on 28 December 1945. He became a Justice of the Peace during his retirement to Thornton-le-Dale; he also aided the RAF Association and the RAF Benevolent Fund in these last years. He died on 26 April 1983.

== Honours and awards ==
Military Cross
Lt. Henry George Crowe, R. Ir. Regt. and R.A.F.

"For conspicuous gallantry and devotion to duty when taking part in many low-flying bomb raids and reconnaissances as an observer. On every occasion he brought back very accurate and valuable information. On three occasions his machine was shot down by enemy fire, but he continued his work, and his great fearlessness and fine spirit have been an invaluable example to others. He has taken part in several air combats and been responsible for the destruction of many hostile machines."

Commander of Order of the British Empire awarded 8 June 1944.

Chinese Cloud and Banner Decoration with Special Cravat awarded 25 June 1946.
