= Edward Paris =

British scientist and Chief Scientific Adviser to the Home Office from 1948 to 1954

Sir Edward Talbot Paris, CB (23 January 1889 – 26 August 1985) was a British scientist. He was Chief Scientific Adviser to the Home Office from 1948 to 1954.
