= Wilfrid St Clair Tisdall =

Major Wilfrid St Clair Tisdall MC

Major Wilfrid St Clair Tisdall MC (2 April 1921 – 20 January 2014) was a British Army officer who won the Military Cross in Holland in 1944 while serving with the 8th King's Royal Irish Hussars. After several attempts to take an enemy gun position had failed, including an attack by tanks, St Clair Tisdall and his troop of infantry charged the position on foot and overran it. St Clair Tisdall served in a variety of positions for the duration of the Second World War and afterwards on the British Army on the Rhine. In 1960 he joined Headquarters Land Forces Persian Gulf at Bahrain. He retired from the army in 1965.

St Clair Tisdall was born at Altrincham, Cheshire, the son of a churchman. He was educated at Dean Close School, Cheltenham, and subsequently read modern languages at Wadham College, Oxford.
