= Leopold George Hill =

English medical missionary

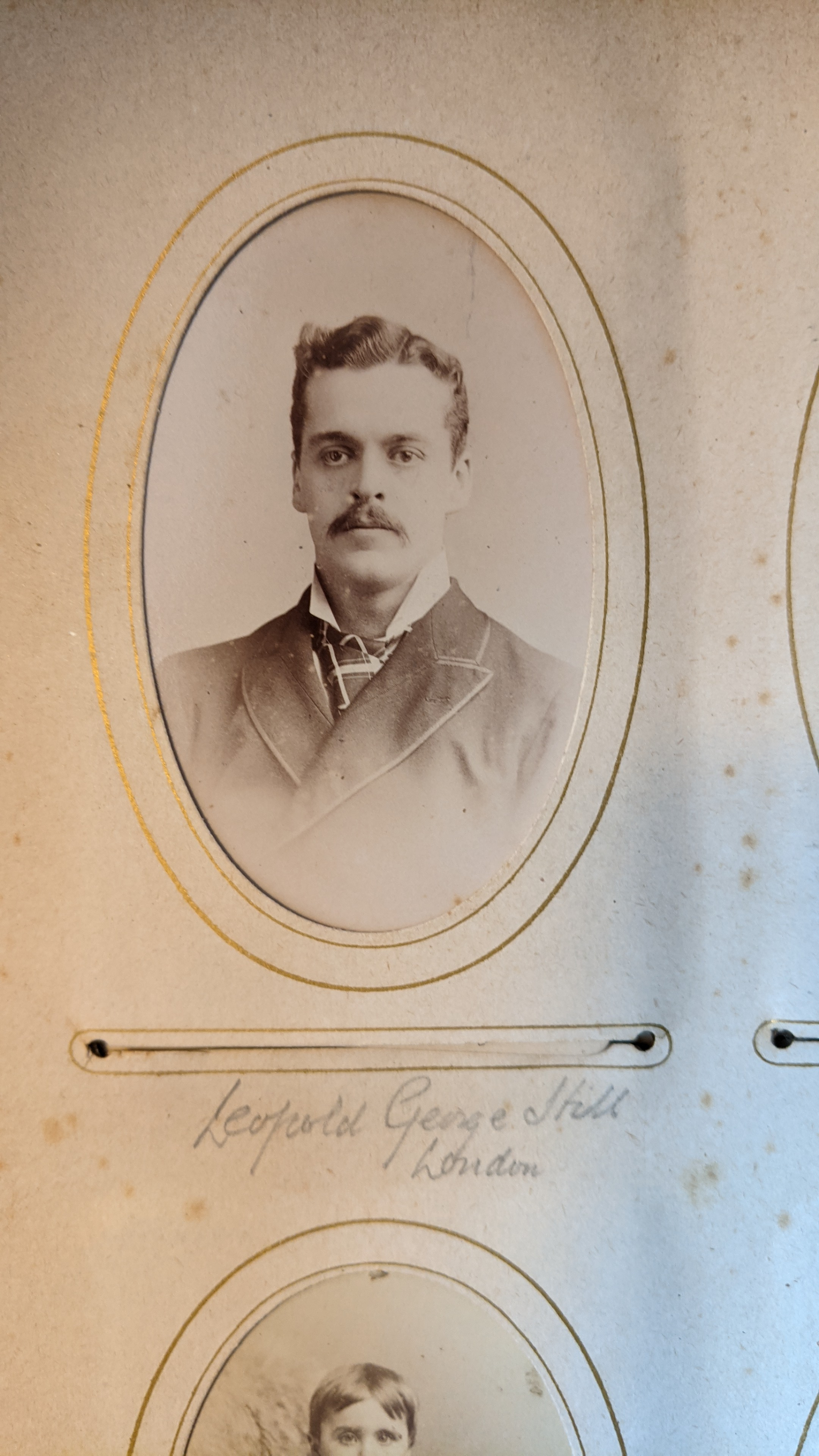
Leopold Hill from old family album

Leopold George Hill (16 December 1866 - October 1922) was an English medical missionary who worked as a member of the Church Mission Society (CMS) treating leprosy patients in Pakhoi (now known as Beihai), China. Hill was motivated to join missionary work by his religious upbringing and intended to treat his patients to not only recover physically but also gain a sense of religious purpose. He worked alongside his wife, Emma Amelia Hill (nee Grabham), as well as with other fellow missionaries to continue the work of Dr. Edward Horder's establishment of the Pakhoi leper colony. After retiring from missionary service, Hill continued his contributions to CMS through administrative work as a Physician to the Society.

== Early life and education ==
Hill was born on 16 December 1866 in Cheltenham, Gloucestershire, England, to a haberdasher father and a housewife mother. Hill was raised in a deeply Christian household, which inspired a calling to missionary work in his teens. He was privately educated in Cheltenham and was medically trained at the London Hospital Medical School. He acquired his license of practice from the Royal College of Surgeons of England (MRCS) and the Royal College of Physicians of London (LRCP). Hill began working at the London Hospital as a receiving casualty room officer and house surgeon in 1888.

== Marriage and family ==
In 1894, Hill married Emma Amelia Grabham, a missionary affiliated with the China Inland Mission (CIM). They traveled together for their work in South China until Hill's eventual retirement. They had 3 children together.

== Career ==
=== Missionary work in Pakhoi ===
Hill was accepted into CMS in August 1893. After his marriage to Grabham, the couple was sent by CMS to the South China Mission in Pakhoi, China in 1895. Hill worked at the local CMS mission hospital under the guidance of Edward George Horder and collaborated frequently with Rev. Edward Barnard Beauchamp. He worked extensively with the leprosy patients that lived in the colony attached to the hospital during his stay in the area. Hill divided his remaining time between overseeing the construction of new hospital buildings in Kotak, superintending the mission boys' school in Rev. Beauchamp's absence, and serving nearby villages with medical chest visits.

With his wife, Hill made it his mission to provide an "object in life" to his patients. He was immensely involved in the religious affairs of the South China Mission, believing that preaching, rather than healing, was the primary goal of the hospital. This belief motivated Hill to learn Chinese with the hopes of introducing scripture to the colony residents alongside Rev. Beauchamp. Additionally, he often addressed local religious meetings to assist with monetary collections for the hospital and to spread the gospel.

In the summer of 1899, Hill applied for a brief leave of absence, citing the deteriorating health of his wife and the need to recover from the physical strain of working 5 years at the undermanned mission hospital. He left for London in February 1900 while unsure about continuing his service in Pakhoi due to the declining health of his mentor, Dr. Edward Horder. Hill returned to Pakhoi in 1902 to continue all his previous work at the Mission Hospital, while also welcoming new staff to Pakhoi in the absence of both Horder and Beauchamp. In 1903, Hill was joined by Rev. Charles Isaac Blanchett and Dr. Harry L. Cliff to serve the growing population of the leper colony.

During his time of missionary service, Hill was appointed Consular Medical Officer and Physician to the Imperial Maritime Customs Service by the European colony in Pakhoi, a position he held until his retirement from the South China Mission.

=== Return to England and continued work with CMS ===
Hill left Pakhoi for a final time in April 1904 on another medical certificate and returned to his residence in London to recuperate from health issues. Citing family reasons, Hill resigned from missionary work in July 1905. By the time of his retirement, he had completed 10.5 years in service (with 3.5 years of absence). Hill settled into private practice in London while maintaining participation in CMS as a Medical Board member. As a Medical Board committee member, Hill oversaw the missionary work that was continuing at his former station in South China.

Hill was appointed as a Physician to the CMS in 1911, and eventually as Honorable Physician in October 1922. As Physician to the CMS, Hill verified and reported the leaves of the missionaries he oversaw. He was responsible for approving the transfers and returns of missionaries he deemed as too ill to continue service.

Additionally, Hill was a medical examiner to the British and Foreign Bible Society and the Colonial and Continental Church Society. During World War I, Hill served as a civil surgeon at the City of London Military Hospital. He also served as an Honorary Anesthetist at Mildmay Memorial Hospital.

== Death ==
Hill died on 26 October 1922 at his home residence in Stoke Newington.

== Legacy ==
Hill is best remembered for his work with the South China Mission leper colony, where he would tend to more than 150 patients at a time by the end of his missionary career. In addition to using religion to alleviate the lives of his patient, Hill was also one of the earliest pioneers in the use of limb amputation as a treatment for leprosy-induced nerve damage.

Along with more common cases of leprosy, cholera, and smallpox, Hill treated some of the first spirillum-infected patients in South China. Hill additionally published literature on lip chancres caused by the oral-transmission of congenital syphilis.
