= Clarence Dobell =

English painter (1836–1917)

Clarence Mason Dobell (1836–1917) was a British artist and illustrator.

== Life ==
Clarence Dobell was born in Cheltenham. He was the son of John Dobell, a wine merchant, and Julietta Thompson, a daughter of Samuel Thompson (1766-1837). His older brothers were the poet Sydney Dobell, and the doctor Horace Dobell. A younger sister, Mary, married the painter Briton Riviere.

The family lived in Charlton Kings, where they were friends of the writer Dinah Craik. Clarence accompanied her on the visit to Tewkesbury Abbey which apparently inspired her to write John Halifax, Gentleman; according to family tradition, several of the novel's characters were based upon members of his family. Dobell illustrated Craik's 1860 collection Our Year.

As a student at the Academy schools, Clarence Dobell introduced his future brother-in-law Briton Riviere to pre-Raphaelite painters. He was a contributor to Good Words from its inception in 1860, and an occasional contributor to Once A Week. He had a studio in Grafton Street, London, and was a friend of John Pettie, whose studio was nearby. He, his brother Sydney and Dinah Craik were close friends of W. J. Linton and his wife Eliza Lynn Linton.

In May 1868, he married Emily Duffield. A son, Walter Duffield Dobell, was educated at Magdalen College, Oxford.

In later life, Dobell seems to have entered the family wine business: he and his brother Cyrus were listed as owners of Cheltenham's Restoration Inn at the end of the century.

== Works ==
- (illus.) Our Year: A Child's Book in Prose and Verse by Dinah Craik, New York: Harper & Brothers, 1860.
- Memoirs of Old Charlton Kings. A series of short papers written for the Charlton Kings Parish Magazine, 1896, 1898
