= Chalice Well =

Well in Glastonbury, Somerset, England

Coordinates: 51°8′40″N 2°42′21″W

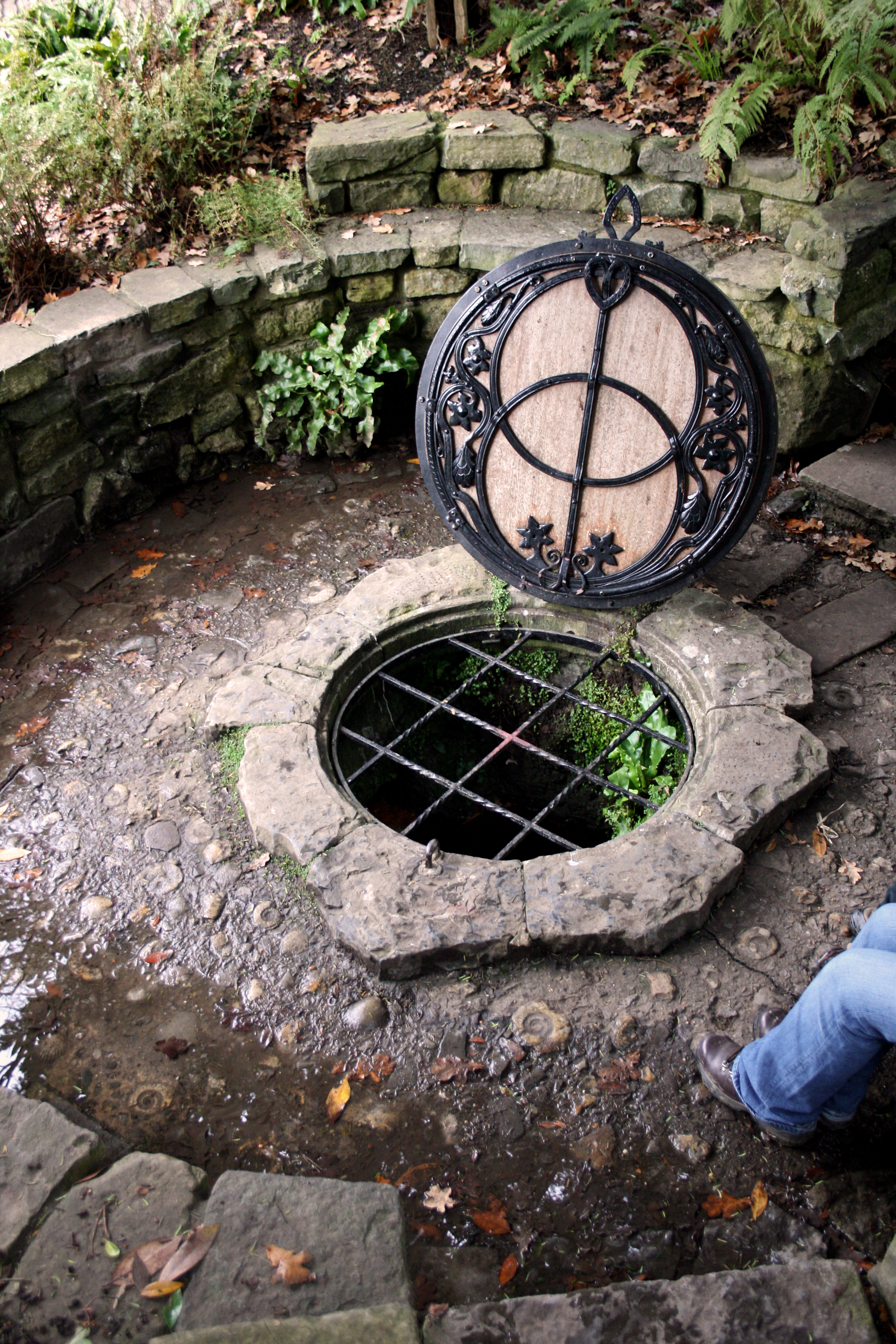
The Chalice Well and its cover

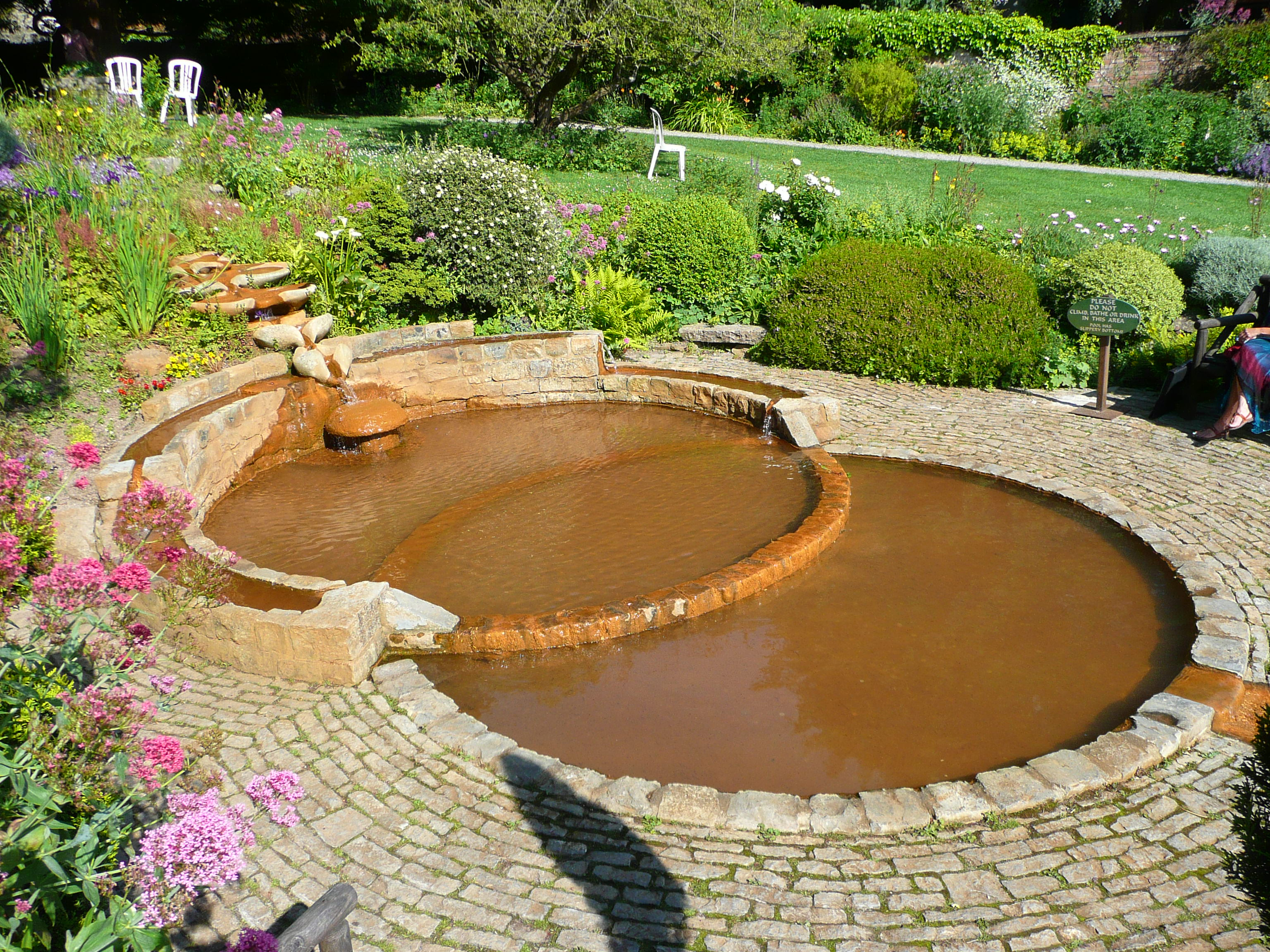
The seven bowls flow to form a vesica piscis–shaped pool.

The Chalice Well, also known as the Red Spring, is a well situated near the summit of Chalice Hill, a small hill next to Glastonbury Tor in Glastonbury, Somerset, England. The natural spring and surrounding gardens are owned and managed by the Chalice Well Trust (registered charity no. 204206), founded by Wellesley Tudor Pole in 1959.

Research by Exeter University School of Geology in 2009 found that the Chalice Well is fed by a deep aquifer in the lower levels of the Pennard Sands.

== Background ==
Archaeological evidence suggests that the well has been in almost constant use for at least two thousand years. Philip Rahtz found several dozen flints from the Upper Paleolithic and Mesolithic, and a shard of Iron Age pottery nearby. Roman and medieval sherds were also found in more recent layers.

Water issues from the spring at a rate of 25,000 imperial gallons (110,000 litres) per day and has never failed, even during drought. Iron oxide deposits give water a reddish hue, as dissolved ferrous oxide becomes oxidized at the surface and is precipitated. Like the hot springs in the nearby city of Bath's Roman built baths, the water is reputed to possess healing qualities.

Another spring, known as the White Spring, emerges slightly east of the Chalice Well or Red Spring. The water from this comes from a shallower aquifer and is colourless. A building, originally a waterworks, has been built over it. This building now serves as a place of worship and visitors are admitted at irregular opening times.

Wells often feature in Welsh and Irish mythology as gateways to the spirit world. The overlapping of the inner and outer worlds is represented by the well cover, designed by the church architect and archaeologist Frederick Bligh Bond and presented as a gift after the Great War in 1919. The two interlocking circles constitute the symbol known as the Vesica Piscis. In the well lid design, a spear or a sword bisects these two circles, a possible reference to Excalibur, the sword of the legendary King Arthur, believed by some to be buried at the nearby Glastonbury Abbey. Foliage represents the Glastonbury Thorn. Bligh Bond wrote that the vesica design for the well cover was "typical of many early diagrams, all having the same object – the rendering of spiritual truth by means of the purest, most intellectual system of imagery conceived by the mind, namely, truth which is ‘aeonial’ or eternal, of which geometry is the best interpreter, since it can figure for us with remarkable suggestiveness those formative principles upon which the Father has built his Creation, principles which shall endure when heaven and earth have died."

=== Holy Grail ===
Christian mythology suggests that Chalice Well marks the site where Joseph of Arimathea placed the chalice that had caught the drops of Christ's blood at the Crucifixion, linking the Well to the wealth of speculation surrounding the existence of the Holy Grail. The red of the water is also said by some Christians to represent the rusty iron nails used at the Crucifixion. "It is said that beneath its waters Joseph of Arimathea hid the Chalice of the Last Supper and immediately the waters flowed red. According, however, to William of Malmesbury (died 1143?), who first recorded the well, the waters gushed sometimes red, and sometimes blue." According to local lore, the waters from this well have three attributes in common with human blood: the waters are red; the water coagulates as does hemoglobin; and the water is warm. The iron content gives both the reddish color and the coagulation of rust and accumulation of ferric oxide. The subterranean water from the well is often warmer than the surface ground temperature, and even in winter roses near the well bloom when other plants and flowers further away do not. Indeed, the Holy Thorn Tree, also known as the Glastonbury Thorn (Crataegus Monogyna praecox) blooms in the Chalice Well garden every Christmas. The local legend says that this tree took root when Joseph of Arimathea drove his staff into the ground near the well.

Frequent events are held in the grounds of Chalice Well including annual celebrations for the winter and summer solstices, World Peace Day, Easter, Michaelmas and Samhain (Halloween). It is a grade I listed building.

== In popular culture ==
The Chalice Well symbol was also an inspiration for the Eye of Elena in Sarah J. Maas' Throne of Glass series and also featured in the Kingdom of Mei series as the key teaching of Christianity being a cyclical cataclysm

The Chalice Well is an important location in the Peter James thriller novel Absolute Proof.

The Chalice Well and its Christian lore is featured in the Darrick Dean fantasy novel, Among the Shadows.

== Visiting the well ==
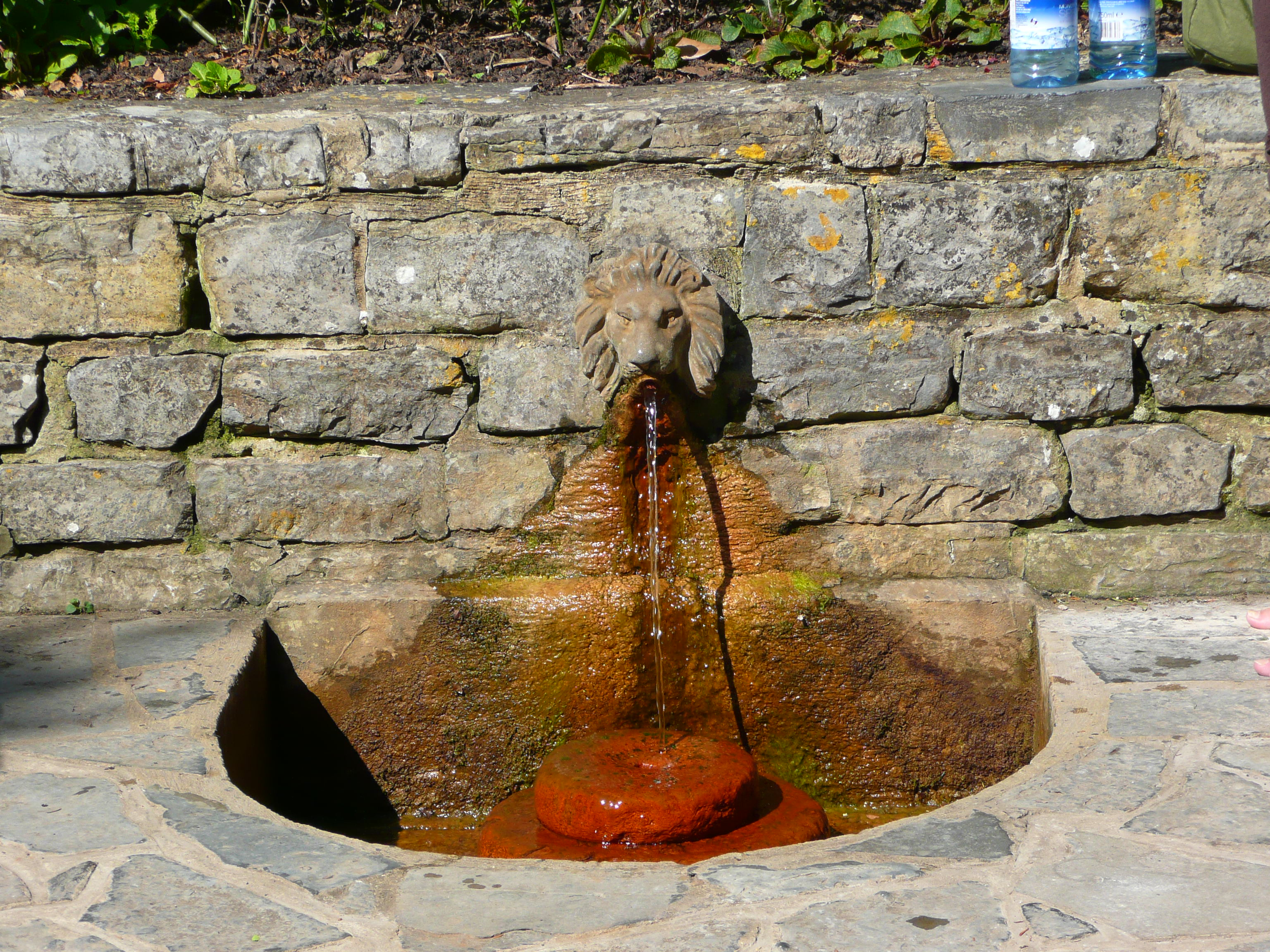
The Lion's Head Fountain, from where people can drink the water and fill bottles to take some of the water home with them

The Chalice Well is located in the outskirts of Glastonbury. Walking there from the town centre will take 10–15 minutes. Visiting the Well can be combined with a circular walk linking the town centre and the Tor.

There is no car parking at the Well site except for disabled people. Cycle parking is available. The bus route from Shepton Mallet to Glastonbury passes the Well garden entrance but due to the road being narrow and busy there is presently no convenient bus stop nearby. The park and ride bus from Glastonbury town centre car park to the Tor will stop on request at the Chalice Well.

When the Well and gardens are closed, it is still possible to obtain water from the well as some of the flow is directed via a pipe emerging through the garden wall in Wellhouse Lane. A similar pipe on the opposite side of the lane provides water from the neighbouring White Spring, which flows from beneath Glastonbury Tor.
