= Henry Anstey Cookson =

British pathologist and bacteriologist (1866–1949)

Henry Anstey Cookson CBE FRSE FRCSE FRCPE (1 July 1886 – 16 May 1949) was a British pathologist and bacteriologist. He was Director of the Pathological Laboratories for northeast England.

== Life ==
He was born on 1 July 1886 in Eastbourne in Sussex to Ina Nicholson and her husband, Major Henry Cookson. He attended Clifton College in Bristol and then studied medicine and chemistry at the University of Edinburgh graduating with an MB ChB in 1910. He then undertook a doctorate in public health at the University of Cambridge.

In the First World War he served at the 1st Eastern General Hospital and was promoted to major in the Royal Army Medical Corps in France. He later transferred to the London Ambulance Regiment and was demobilised in January 1919.

In 1923, he moved from Cheltenham to County Durham to take on the role of Consulting Pathologist for Durham County Hospital. He continued here until 1948, also taking on the role of Bacteriologist to Sunderland County Borough and Director of the Pathological Laboratories.

He was elected a Fellow of the Royal Society of Edinburgh in 1941 his proposers including James Couper Brash and Alexander Murray Drennan. In 1947, he was made a Commander of the Order of the British Empire (CBE) for public services in the County of Durham.

He died in Toronto in Canada on 16 May 1949.

== Family ==
He married Elizabeth Georgina Mackie at Chedworth in October 1915, just before leaving Britain to serve in the war. They lived at Westwood in Cheltenham. They had two sons: Thomas Anstey Cookson (born 1917) and Brian Anstey Cookson (born 1922).
