= Baháʼí Faith in the United Kingdom =

British Baháʼís
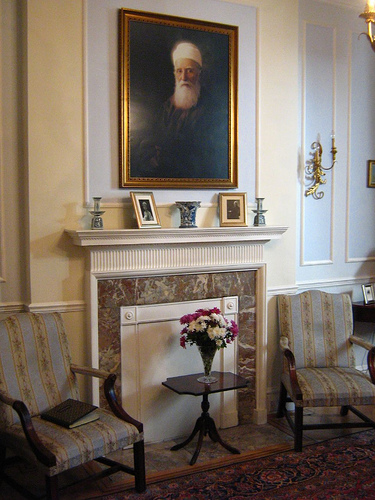
- Waiting room inside the National Bahá'í Centre of the United Kingdom in London

Total population
- 5,006 (2021 census, excluding Scotland)

Religions
- Baháʼí Faith

Languages
- English; Indian Languages

The Baháʼí Faith in the United Kingdom started in 1898 when Mrs. Mary Thornburgh-Cropper (d. 1938), an American by birth, became the first adherent of the Baháʼí Faith in England. Through the 1930s, the number of Baháʼís in the United Kingdom grew, leading to a pioneer movement beginning after the Second World War with sixty percent of the British Baháʼí community eventually relocating. At the 2021 UK Census, there were 4,725 Baháʼís in England and Wales, making it the 17th largest religion, a decline of 6% compared to the 2011 UK Census, when there were 5,021 Baháʼís in England and Wales. In Northern Ireland, there were 281 Baháʼís recorded in the 2021 census.

== History ==
=== Earliest phase ===
Scholar Moojan Momen has identified the first account in the West as being January 8, 1845 as an exchange of British diplomatic reports not published in the newspapers. This was an account of the first Letter of the Living to be sent on a mission by the Báb, whom Baháʼís accept as a precursor of their religion. He was the second Letter of the Living and first Babí martyr, Mullá ʻAlí-i-Bastámí. These exchanges were between Sir Henry Rawlinson who wrote first to Sir Stratford Canning. Follow-up exchanges continued through to April 1846 where diplomatic records of events end. Ottoman state archives affirm his arrival in Istanbul where he is then sentenced to serve in the naval ship yards at hard labor - the Ottoman ruler refusing to banish him as it would be "difficult to control his activities and prevent him spreading his false ideas."

The first newspaper/public reference to the religious movement began with coverage of the Báb which occurred in The Times on 1 November 1845 which relied on Muslim reactions to the new religion. This newspaper account was echoed many times in local and far distant newspapers into early 1846 as far away as New Zealand.

In later 1852 into 1853 there was an event which caused great suffering on Babís. The Babís were blamed for an attempted assassination of the Shah of Persia. Recent scholarship has identified a fringe element distinct from all the major aspects of the religion, its community and leadership at the time. Nevertheless, coverage in newspapers at the time often echoed the Persian government's view blaming the Babís and Babís in large numbers were in fact executed as a result, however as the months dragged on reports of the deaths of large numbers of Babis progress from hundreds in Tehran by early of November, 1852, to tens of thousands in the south of the country by late December.

There was then a British mission in Tehran, Persia, and it reported on the events regarding Bábism during that period and after Baháʼu'lláh's banishment to Baghdad. The British consul-general of Baghdad offered him British citizenship and offered to arrange for a residence for him in India or any place he wished. Baháʼu'lláh refused the offer. After being further banished from Baghdad, Baháʼu'lláh wrote a specific letter or "tablet" addressed to Queen Victoria commenting favourably on the British parliamentary system and commending the Queen for the fact that her government had ended slavery in the British Empire. She, in response to the tablet, is reported to have said, though the original record is lost, that "If this is of God, it will endure; if not, it can do no harm."

In 1879, on the developing trade relations Dutchman Johan Colligan entered into partnership with two Baháʼís, Haji Siyyid Muhammad-Hasan and Haji Siyyid Muhammad-Husayn, who were known as the King and Beloved of Martyrs. These two Baháʼís were arrested and executed because the Imám-Jum'ih at the time owed them a large sum of money for business relations and instead of paying them would confiscate their property. Their execution was committed despite Colligan's testifying to their innocence. He did manage to motivate Persian merchants to defend their innocence and there was a brief respite in their suffering which was witnessed by Edward Slack then serving in the British Bengal civil service, memoirs of which he published in 1882.

In addition to such coverage, Edward G. Browne of Cambridge University produced significant materials on the history of the religion and in April 1890 was granted four interviews with Baháʼu'lláh after he had arrived in the area of Akka and left the only detailed description by a Westerner.

After Mrs. Mary Thornburgh-Cropper became a Baháʼí in 1898, the second person and the first native person to become a Baháʼí was Miss Ethel Rosenberg (d.1930), in the summer of 1899. The formal declaration of Miss Sarah Ann Ridgway is evidenced in her letter of November 1899. Sarah or 'Annie' as she referred to herself in letters and her immigration documents had travelled from Salford, UK, to work in North America. She was a silk weaver who met Abdul Baha in Liverpool and in London in 1912. She died in Salford Royal Hospital and was buried in a pauper's grave before Manchester friends were aware of her demise. Dr. Frederick D'Evelyn was an Irishman from Belfast who moved to the United States and became a Baháʼí in 1901 and who served on the forerunner to the United States Baháʼí National Spiritual Assembly. Another distinguished Baháʼí was Lady Blomfield, second wife to architect Sir Arthur Blomfield. Lady Blomfield was a member of the National Spiritual Assembly of the British Isles for eight years, an accomplished author, and a humanitarian who assisted in founding the Save the Children Fund and the Geneva Declaration of the Rights of the Child and its adoption by the League of Nations; she joined the religion in 1907. Other noteworthy people who became early members of the religion included George Townshend (an Irishman, but Ireland was then part of the United Kingdom) and Scotsman John Esslemont.

=== Pre First World War ===
Other mentions of the Baháʼí Faith included the Archdeacon Wilberforce mentioning the religion in a sermon at the Church of St. John in Westminster in March 1911. Due to this mention, great interest was generated, and a Baháʼí reading room was opened.

In 1910, ʻAbdu'l-Bahá, then head of the Baháʼí Faith, embarked on a three-year journey to Egypt, Europe, and North America, spreading the Baháʼí message. During his travels, he visited England in the autumn of 1911. On September 10 he made his first public appearance before an audience at the City Temple, London, with the English translation spoken by Wellesley Tudor Pole. ʻAbdu'l-Bahá returned to the British Isles, visiting Baháʼís in Liverpool, London, Edinburgh, Oxford, and Bristol in 1912–13. See ʻAbdu'l-Bahá's journeys to the West.

In 1914, the Baháʼís present in England had organised themselves into a committee, though it lapsed after February 1916. Also the co-editor of the Encyclopaedia Biblica, Thomas Kelly Cheyne, became a member of the religion by 1914, though he was to die the next year.

After his last return to Palestine ʻAbdu'l-Bahá mentioned various lands around the world that the religion should be introduced to and referred to WWI and qualities of those who seek to serve the religion. This took the form of a these series of letters, or tablets, to the followers of the religion in the United States in 1916-1917; these letters were compiled together in the book Tablets of the Divine Plan. The seventh of the tablets mentioned European regions. It was written on April 11, 1916, but was delayed in being presented in the United States until 1919—after the end of the First World War and the Spanish flu. The seventh tablet was translated and presented on April 4, 1919, and published in Star of the West magazine on December 12, 1919 and mentioned the islands. He says:

"Therefore, O ye believers of God! Show ye an effort and after this war spread ye the synopsis of the divine teachings in the British Isles, France, Germany, Austria-Hungary, Russia, Italy, Spain, Belgium, Switzerland, Norway, Sweden, Denmark, Holland, Portugal, Rumania, Serbia, Montenegro, Bulgaria, Greece, Andorra, Liechtenstein, Luxemburg, Monaco, San Marino, Balearic Isles, Corsica, Sardinia, Sicily, Crete, Malta, Iceland, Faroe Islands, Shetland Islands, Hebrides and Orkney Islands."

During World War I Tudor Pole served in the Directorate of Military Intelligence in the Middle East and was directly involved in addressing the concerns raised by the Ottoman threats against ʻAbdu'l-Bahá, which ultimately required General Allenby altering his plans for the prosecution of the war in the Palestine theatre.

=== Interwar period ===
Following the events of the First World War and the knighting of ʻAbdu'l-Bahá by the British Mandate for Palestine for his humanitarian efforts during the war, the Baháʼí administration for the United Kingdom started to form. In 1921, while Tudor Pole was Secretary of the Baháʼí community in London, the telegram announcing the passing of ʻAbdu'l-Bahá by his sister, Bahíyyih Khánum, arrived at Tudor Pole's home in London, and it was there read by Shoghi Effendi. A Baháʼí Spiritual Assembly for England (also called All-England Baháʼí Council) was set up in May 1922 and held its first meeting in London on 17 June 1922, with the first Local Spiritual Assemblies being formed in London, Manchester and Bournemouth. On 13 October 1923, in London, the National Spiritual Assembly of England came into being; in 1930 this became the National Spiritual Assembly of the Baháʼís of the British Isles. Hasan Balyuzi came to England in 1932 and was immediately elected to the National Assembly. He was annually re-elected until 1960, as well as named a Hand of the Cause in 1957. Local Assemblies were founded in Bradford and Torquay in 1939.

During this time notable Britons who became Baháʼís included Richard St. Barbe Baker - forester, environmental activist, and author - who joined the religion around 1924. Mark Tobey, an American artist who stayed in Britain from 1930–38, held Baháʼí study classes in Dartington Hall in Devon and lectures in Torquay. As a result of this activity two famous artists became Baháʼís: Bernard Leach, the world-famous potter, in about 1940, and Reginald Turvey, a prominent South African painter, in 1936. Also in the 1930s a whole host of activities began - a Baháʼí theatre group was formed in London, the Baháʼí Journal was instituted, Baháʼí summer schools began, and the tradition of a winter Baháʼí conference was established. Local Spiritual Assemblies were then formed in Bradford and Torquay in 1939, while the National Assembly achieved legal standing with its incorporation. John Ferraby became a Baháʼí in 1941 and was named as a Hand of the Cause - the 4th in the nation's history - in 1957. Furthermore, British Baháʼí families moving to Australia helped found the Baháʼí Faith in Australia during the 1920s.

=== Post Second World War ===
In 1946, a great pioneer movement began implementing the Tablets of the Divine Plan with sixty percent of the British Baháʼí community eventually relocating. It is estimated that between 1951 and 1993, Baháʼís from the United Kingdom settled in 138 countries. Intrantionally this effort would take the Baháʼí Faith to Scotland and Wales and raising the numbers of Local Assemblies in the British Isles from five to twenty-four, among which four being in the large cities of Edinburgh, Belfast, and Cardiff. In 1950-1 the Baha'is of the British Isles pioneered to Tanganyika, Uganda, and Kenya, and in 1953, Baháʼís moved to the Scottish islands, as well as the Crown Dependencies of Jersey, Guernsey and the Isle of Man.

Tristan da Cunha is often characterized as one of the most remote places humans inhabit. It is an island group in the south Atlantic which is part of the United Kingdom as a British overseas territory called Saint Helena, Ascension and Tristan da Cunha; Saint Helena has had a Baháʼí population since 1954. No outsiders are allowed to buy land or settle on Tristan.

==== Three luminaries ====
In 1955 Shoghi Effendi, then head of the religion, posthumously described three individuals as the "three luminaries of the Irish, English and Scottish Baháʼí communities".

- Thomas Breakwell was born in Woking, England, and heard of the religion at the age of 29 while in Paris in the summer of 1901 while on one of his regular vacations from the United States where he was working. After a pilgrimage to Acre, he remained in Paris at the request of ʻAbdu'l-Bahá, quitting his job in the cotton mills of the American South out of a sense of sin where child labour was still the norm. Breakwell died in 1902 of tuberculosis. Heartbroken at his passing ʻAbdu'l-Bahá wrote a moving and inspiring tablet.
- John Esslemont was from Scotland and was the author of the well-known introductory book on the Baháʼí Faith, Baháʼu'lláh and the New Era, which was originally published in 1923 and has been translated into numerous languages and remains a key introduction to the Baháʼí religion. He was named posthumously by Shoghi Effendi as the first of the Hands of the Cause he appointed, and as one of the Disciples of ʻAbdu'l-Bahá. He was also an accomplished medical doctor and linguist, becoming proficient in western and eastern languages.
- George Townshend was born in Ireland and began his advocacy of the Baháʼí religion around 1920 though an Anglican Church clergyman. In 1947 he tendered a very public renouncement of his orders to the Anglican Church in his 70th year during a period of expansion of the Baháʼí Faith across the British Commonwealth and its former territories. He later became a Hand of the Cause. He was the author of numerous works like Christ and Baháʼu'lláh.

==== Resting place of Shoghi Effendi ====
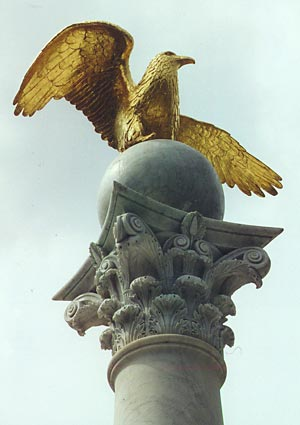
Monument over Shoghi Effendi's resting place

On 4 November 1957, Shoghi Effendi, head of the religion, died in London, and thus the city has become a centre to which Baháʼís from all over the world come. His mortal remains lie in the New Southgate Cemetery in London.

==== First Baháʼí World Congress ====
In 1963, the number of Baháʼí assemblies in the United Kingdom totalled 50, and the British community hosted the first Baháʼí World Congress. It was held in the Royal Albert Hall and chaired by Hand of the Cause Enoch Olinga, where approximately 6,000 Baháʼís from around the world gathered. It was called to commemorate the hundredth anniversary of the declaration of Baháʼu'lláh, and announce and present the election of the first members of the Universal House of Justice with the participation of over 50 National Spiritual Assemblies' members.

=== Period to the second Baháʼí World Congress ===
The National Spiritual Assembly of the Baháʼís of the British Isles was registered as a charity in 1967, and in 1972 the single National Spiritual Assembly was reformed into two — one of the United Kingdom, and one of the Republic of Ireland established that year.

George Hackney (1888 - 1977) was a soldier in WWI at the Battle of the Somme and elsewhere, from Northern Ireland, and took pictures only recently unveiled to the public. He converted to the Baháʼí Faith early of the region in the 1960s.

In 1973 there were 102 assemblies in the United Kingdom. In 1978 the Baháʼí marriage ceremony was recognised in Scotland, and the Baháʼí Holy Days were recognised by local education authorities throughout the United Kingdom. It is estimated that between 1951 and 1993, Baháʼís from the United Kingdom settled in 138 countries. It is probable that only the Baháʼí communities of Iran and the United States have sent out more pioneers than the United Kingdom, and they have much larger Baháʼí communities.

== Recent developments ==
Since its inception the religion has had involvement in socio-economic development, beginning by giving greater freedom to women, promulgating the promotion of female education as a priority concern, and that involvement was given practical expression by creating schools, agricultural cooperatives, and clinics. The religion entered a new phase of activity when a message of the Universal House of Justice dated 20 October 1983 was released. Baháʼís were urged to seek out ways, compatible with the Baháʼí teachings, in which they could become involved in the social and economic development of the communities in which they lived. Worldwide in 1979 there were 129 officially recognized Baháʼí socio-economic development projects. By 1987, the number of officially recognized development projects had increased to 1482. Recently, British Baháʼís have been involved in Agenda 21 activities in the UK, and have established an Institute for Social Cohesion as an agency of the National Spiritual Assembly of the Baháʼís of the United Kingdom responding to the challenges of the large diversity of the citizens in the vicinity of Hackney Central, and Britain in general including six Parliamentary seminars and two major conferences from 2001 to 2004.

In February 2009 two open letters were published with lists including British citizens registering their opposition to the trial of Baháʼí leaders in Iran. The first was when some British were among the two hundred and sixty seven non-Baháʼí Iranian academics, writers, artists, journalists and activists from some 21 countries including Iran signed an open letter of apology posted to Iranian.com and stating they were "ashamed" and pledging their support for achieving the rights detailed in the Universal Declaration of Human Rights for the Baháʼís in Iran. The second letter a few weeks later was when entertainers David Baddiel, Bill Bailey, Morwenna Banks, Sanjeev Bhaskar, Jo Brand, Russell Brand, Rob Brydon, Jimmy Carr, Jack Dee, Omid Djalili, Sean Lock, Lee Mack, Alexei Sayle, Meera Syal, and Mark Thomas said in an open letter printed in The Times of London of the Baháʼí leaders to be on trial in Iran: "In reality, their only 'crime', which the current regime finds intolerable, is that they hold a religious belief that is different from the majority…. We register our solidarity with all those in Iran who are being persecuted for promoting the best development of society …(and) with the governments, human rights organisations and people of goodwill throughout the world who have so far raised their voices calling for a fair trial, if not the complete release of the Bahaʼi leaders in Iran." In between the open letters, on February 16, British Foreign Office Minister Bill Rammell expressed concern over the trial. See Persecution of Baháʼís.

=== Isle of Man Local Spiritual Assembly ===
Though not part of the United Kingdom, in 1993, a Local Spiritual Assembly was established on the Isle of Man under the jurisdiction of the National Spiritual Assembly of the United Kingdom.

=== Demographics ===
In 2004, the Baháʼí International Community organization estimated there were over 5,000 members in the United Kingdom, while a 2010 report from the Association of Religion Data Archives estimated some 47,500 members. However, the 2011 Census showed a little over 5,000 self-identifying members and the 2021 census showed a slight decline to 4,725. A Christian source claims there are 7 Baháʼís on the Falkland Islands, while another report states that there were 67 adherents in 2000.

=== Buildings ===
In 2020, Historic England published A Survey of Baha'i Buildings in England with the aim of providing information about buildings that Bahá’í use in England so that Historic England can work with communities to enhance and protect those buildings now and in the future. The scoping survey identified six Bahá’í buildings in England.

== Notable Baháʼís ==
British comedians Omid Djalili and Inder Manocha are Baháʼís.

== See also ==
- Religion in the United Kingdom
- Baháʼí Faith in England
- Baháʼí Faith in Scotland
- Baháʼí Faith in Wales
- Baháʼí Faith in Northern Ireland
