= Baháʼí Faith in England =

The Baháʼí Faith in England started with the earliest mentions of the predecessor of the Baháʼí Faith, the Báb, in The Times on 1 November 1845, only a little over a year after the Báb first stated his mission. Today there are Baháʼí communities across the country from Carlisle to Cornwall.

== History ==
The first person in England to become a Baháʼí, in 1898, was Mrs. Mary Thornburgh-Cropper (d. 1938), who lived in London though she was an American by birth. The first native person in the country to become a Baháʼí was Ethel Jenner Rosenberg (d. 1930), who did so in 1899. An early, important figure was Thomas Breakwell, posthumously described by Shoghi Effendi, the head of the Baháʼí Faith in the first half of the 20th century, as one of "three luminaries of the Irish, English and Scottish Baháʼí communities". He was born in Woking and heard of the Baha'i Faith at the age of 29 during the summer of 1901 while on vacation in Paris from the United States where he was then working. After a pilgrimage to Acre, he remained in Paris at the request of ʻAbdu'l-Bahá, quitting his job in the cotton mills of the American South out of a sense of sin where child labour was still the norm. Breakwell died in 1902 of tuberculosis. Heartbroken at his death ʻAbdu'l-Bahá wrote a moving and inspiring tablet.

On a visit to Constantinople prior to the Young Turk Revolution in 1908 Wellesley Tudor Pole heard of ʻAbdu'l-Bahá and met and interviewed him over nine days in late November 1910 in Cairo and Alexandria. For the next several decades he was active in the Baháʼí Faith.

Other mentions of the Baháʼí Faith included the Archdeacon Wilberforce mentioning the religion in a sermon at the Church of St. John in Westminster in March 1911. Due to this mention, great interest was generated, and a Baháʼí reading room was opened. When ʻAbdu'l-Bahá traveled to the West, Tudor Pole spoke the English translation of his first talk on the evening of 10 September 1911.

In 1914, the Baháʼís present in England had organised themselves into a committee, though it lapsed after February 1916. During World War I Tudor Pole served in the Directorate of Military Intelligence in the Middle East and was directly involved in addressing the concerns raised by the Ottoman threats against ʻAbdu'l-Bahá, which ultimately required General Allenby altering his plans for the prosecution of the war in the Palestine theatre. In 1921, while Tudor Pole was Secretary of the Local Spiritual Assembly in London, the telegram announcing the passing of ʻAbdu'l-Bahá by his sister, Bahíyyih Khánum, arrived at Tudor Pole's home in London, and it was there read by Shoghi Effendi. A Baháʼí Spiritual Assembly for England (also called All-England Baháʼí Council) was set up in May 1922 and held its first meeting in London on 17 June 1922, with the first Local Spiritual Assemblies being formed in London, Manchester and Bournemouth. Local Assemblies were founded in Bradford and Torquay in 1939.

Also in the 1930s a whole host of activities began - a Baháʼí theatre group was formed in London, the Baháʼí Journal was instituted, Baháʼí summer schools began, and the tradition of a winter Baháʼí conference was established. Local Spiritual Assemblies were formed in Bradford and Torquay in 1939, while the National Assembly achieved legal standing with its incorporation. John Ferraby became a Baháʼí in 1941 (later named as a Hand of the Cause in 1957).

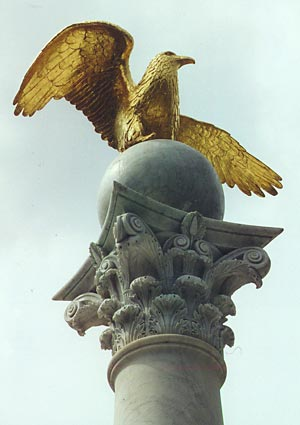
Monument over Shoghi Effendi's resting place

On 4 November 1957, Shoghi Effendi, then head of the Baháʼí Faith, died in London, and thus the city has become a centre to which Baháʼís from all over the world come. His mortal remains lie in the New Southgate Cemetery in London. Directions to his resting place are posted online.

In 1963, the first Baháʼí World Congress was held in the Royal Albert Hall in London, and approximately 6,000 Baháʼís from around the world gathered. It was called to commemorate the hundredth anniversary of the declaration of Baháʼu'lláh, and announce and present the election of the first members of the Universal House of Justice with the participation of over 50 National Spiritual Assemblies' members.

In 1978 the Baháʼí Holy Days were recognised by local education authorities throughout the country.

== National organisation ==
A National Spiritual Assembly of England came into being on 13 October 1923. However, this body became the National Spiritual Assembly of the Baháʼís of the British Isles in 1930, being registered as a charity under this name in 1967. In 1972, this single National Spiritual Assembly was reformed into two — one of the United Kingdom, and one of the Republic of Ireland. There are no plans, at present, to form separate National Spiritual Assemblies for England, Northern Ireland, Scotland and Wales.

== List of Baháʼí Faith people in England ==
- Omid Djalili, comedian
- David Kelly, Welsh-born weapons expert whose death near his Oxfordshire home in 2003 led to the Hutton Inquiry
- Inder Manocha, comedian

== See also ==
- Baháʼí Faith in Northern Ireland
- Baháʼí Faith in Scotland
- Baháʼí Faith in Wales
- Baháʼí Faith in the United Kingdom
