= Baháʼí Faith in Scotland =

The Baháʼí Faith first arrived in Scotland during the first decade of the 20th century, and in 1913 'Abdu’l-Bahá made a three-day visit to Edinburgh at the invitation of Mrs Jane E. Whyte, wife of Dr Alexander Whyte, Moderator of the General Assembly Free Church of Scotland. Over the following decades the Baháʼí Faith spread across Scotland, with Baháʼi communities now established in most cities across the country and many of the Scottish islands, including Orkney, Shetland, Skye and Isle of Lewis.

== History ==
The first person to become a Bahá’i in Scotland was Arthur Cuthbert, who lived on the Balgreggan Estate south of Stranraer. Although it's not clear exactly when he declared himself to be a Baháʼi, there are reports of Baháʼis visiting him early in the 1900s. When Cuthbert was staying in Haifa sometime during the 1880s or early 1890s, he caught sight of Baháʼu’lláh in the distance on three occasions, at a time when Baháʼu'lláh was staying in the German colony at Haifa, Israel. In 1906 Cuthbert wrote to 'Abdu’l-Bahá with questions, 'Abdu’l-Bahá responding with a letter [tablet] stressing the power of God's Manifestations, particularly Baháʼu’lláh, to transform the world.

In 1906, Mrs Jane Elizabeth Whyte, wife of onetime Moderator of the General Assembly of the Free Church of Scotland, Alexander Whyte, travelled to 'Akká in Palestine in order to visit 'Abdu’l-Bahá, the son of Baháʼu’lláh. The invitation came from Mrs Whyte's friend, Mary Thornburgh-Cropper, who was the first person to become a Baháʼi in England in 1898. Mrs. Whyte was encouraged to take up the offer by Professor E. G. Browne, who was the only Westerner to leave an account of his meeting with Baháʼu’lláh, in 'Akká, in 1890; he later visited 'Abdu’l-Bahá in London and Paris during 1912–13.

On her return to Edinburgh, Mrs Whyte began sharing the Baháʼi teachings, and during the World Missionary Conference which took place in Edinburgh in 1910, she distributed copies of Baháʼu’lláh’s Hidden Words amongst the participants. As a result of Mrs Whyte's connection with the Baháʼi Faith, she was instrumental in planning and organising a visit to Edinburgh by 'Abdu’l-Bahá in January 1913.

Two years previously, in 1911, the Scottish branch of the Theosophical Society published a long article on the Baháʼi Faith in their journal, 'Theosophy in Scotland'. This came about through correspondence with Major Tudor Pole who was closely affiliated with the Baháʼis and a key figure in alternative spiritual thinking at the beginning of the century. When 'Abdu’l-Bahá first visited England in 1911 the Secretary of the Scottish Theosophical Society, Mr Graham Pole, took a delegation to London from Scotland to meet him, returning home with a very positive report on the visit.

Arriving in Edinburgh on 6 January 1913, 'Abdu’l-Bahá stayed with the Whytes at the manse, 7 Charlotte Square. Several Scottish newspapers had advertised his visit in advance of his arrival, including the Edinburgh Evening News and Edinburgh Evening Dispatch, and on 6 January 1913 The Scotsman included details of 'Abdu’l-Bahá's planned meetings in the capital.

'Abdu’l-Bahá's three-day visit to Edinburgh was relentless. At the invitation of Sir Patrick Geddes he was taken on a visit of the Outlook Tower, including the Camera Obscura, [Edinburgh]; on the same day, he addressed a meeting of the Edinburgh Esperanto Society in the newly built Freemason's Hall, attended by so many people that three hundred were required to stand outside. The Outlook Tower society invited 'Abdu’l-Bahá to speak at the Rainy Hall, followed by a performance of Handel's Messiah in St Giles Cathedral which had been organised for the poor of the city by a group of philanthropists. His talk for the Theosophical Society of Edinburgh was held at 28 Great King Street, before which the secretary of the Society, David Graham Pole, stated: ’ 'Abdu’l- Bahá has tremendous spiritual powers. In my opinion, He is the focal point of the spiritual, intellectual, and theological forces of the present and future centuries.' Included in his schedule were personal visits and invitations to an orphanage and school, as well as a visit to the foremost Celtic revivalist painter John Duncan, a leading representative of the Celtic Revival in Scottish art.

Following 'Abdu’l-Bahá’s visit to Edinburgh the subject of the Bahá’i Faith continued to be a subject of interest both in the newspapers as well as in meetings of the Esperantists, the Outlook Tower society and in private homes. Keen to promote the teachings of the Bahá’i Faith, the theosophists continued to publish material in 'Theosophy in Scotland', and Mrs Whyte maintained her association with Bahá’is both in England and America. Over the following three decades Bahá’i activities in Edinburgh decreased, reemerging in the 1940s.

It was during this lull that Scotsman, John Esslemont, wrote and published his definitive work on the Bahá’i Faith, Baháʼu'lláh and the New Era, having become the first Baháʼí in Bournemouth in 1915. John Esslemont spent only short periods of time in his native city, Aberdeen, the last being a few months in 1923 before moving to Haifa in November 1924, at the invitation of Shoghi Effendi, the Guardian of the Bahá’i Faith. In March 1925 he met the first person to become a Bahá’i in New Zealand, Margaret Stevenson, who was on Pilgrimage, and on hearing that she was planning to spend time in the United Kingdom, he urged her to visit his family in Scotland. John Esslemont died of tuberculosis whilst he was in Haifa, in November 1925; he had been a close friend and invaluable assistant to Shoghi Effendi, who wrote following his death, “. . he served even unto his last day with exemplary faith and unstinted devotion. His tenacity of faith, his high integrity, his self-effacement, his industry and painstaking labours were traits of a character the noble qualities of which will live and live forever after him. To me personally he was the warmest of friends, a trusted counsellor, an indefatigable collaborator, a lovable companion". Later, in 1955, Shoghi Effendi described John Esslemont as being one of the "three luminaries of the Irish, English and Scottish Baháʼí communities".

In late 1926 Martha Root, who travelled globally in order to spread the teachings of the Baháʼí Faith, visited Edinburgh for an Esperanto convention, and was joined by Lydia Zamenhof, daughter of L. L. Zamenhof, the founder of Esperanto. Lydia had carried on his work following his death in 1917 and became a Baháʼí sometime after 1925.

Three years after His return to Palestine in 1913 ʻAbdu’l-Bahá began writingTablets of the Divine Plan, a series of fourteen letters to the Bahá’is of the United States and Canada. In the seventh letter, which was translated into English and published in the Star of the West magazine on 12 December 1919, ʻAbdu’l-Bahá listed regions in Europe which the Bahá’i Faith still needed to reach, writing: "Therefore, O ye believers of God! Show ye an effort and after this war spread ye the synopsis of the divine teachings in the British Isles, France, Germany, Austria-Hungary, Russia, Italy, Spain, Belgium, Switzerland, Norway, Sweden, Denmark, Holland, Portugal, Rumania, Serbia, Montenegro, Bulgaria, Greece, Andorra, Liechtenstein, Luxemburg, Monaco, San Marino, Balearic Isles, Corsica, Sardinia, Sicily, Crete, Malta, Iceland, Faroe Islands, Shetland Islands, Hebrides and Orkney Islands."

In May 1944, towards the end of the Second World War, the British Bahá’i community, which at that time was still very much concentrated in England, requested Shoghi Effendi, 'Abdu’l-Bahá's grandson and the Guardian of the Bahá’i Faith, to set goals for a six-year plan which they were establishing; his telegram response stated, "WELCOME SPONTANEOUS DECISION ADVISE FORMATION NINETEEN [local] SPIRITUAL ASSEMBLIES SPREAD OVER ENGLAND WALES SCOTLAND NORTHERN IRELAND AND EIRE PRAYING SIGNAL VICTORY".

The result of this response from the Guardian motivated Bahá’is living in England to help establish Bahá’i communities in the other countries of the British Isles, with sixty per cent of the Baháʼí community of England eventually relocating. This effort took the Baháʼí Faith to Scotland, Wales, and Ireland, and increased the number of Local Spiritual Assemblies in the British Isles.

== Establishment of the Bahá’i Faith in Scotland ==
In 1946 an Egyptian Bahá’i moved to Edinburgh in order to study medicine, and as a result of his invitation to Bahá’is from further afield to speak at his meetings, several people in the city became believers. Although by 1948 the doctor had returned to Egypt, there were enough believers, including new recruits and pioneers, to form the first Local Spiritual Assembly, or LSA of Edinburgh, on 21 April 1948. The first to become a Baháʼí in this period (in March 1948) was Dr. William Johnston, who had met ʻAbdu'l-Bahá in Edinburgh in 1913.

In 1978 a Bahá’i Centre was established at 26 North Fort Street, in the Leith area of Edinburgh, with the first legally-recognised marriage ceremony in the United Kingdom outside the Christian Faith to take place there attracting national publicity in both the press and radio. In 1981 Rúḥíyyih Khánum, the wife of Shoghi Effendi, Guardian of the Bahá’i Faith, visited the centre, also travelling to the Shetland Islands, the Hebrides and Orkney.

In the decades following the formation of the first LSA in Edinburgh, LSAs were established in towns and cities across Scotland, from Dumfries in the south to Inverness in the north. LSAs were also established on the islands of Scotland, including Shetland, Orkney, Skye, The Outer Hebrides and Mull, primarily through the efforts of a few pioneers and a sprinkling of new local believers. Most of the islands still have thriving Baháʼí communities.

In May 1997 the Universal House of Justice issued a letter announcing the formation of the first regional Baháʼí Councils, with the Baháʼí Council for Scotland being established in the same year, elected by the LSAs of Scotland, with membership approved by the National Spiritual Assembly.

In 2005 a new Bahá’i Centre was purchased at 44, Albany Street, a Georgian house in the city centre. The inauguration of new national Baháʼí centre took place in Edinburgh on 23 May 2011, on the anniversary of the Declaration of the Báb. Over 80 guests heard Kenny MacAskill MSP, Scottish Cabinet Secretary for Justice, giving the opening keynote address.

== Late Twentieth Century ==
In 1960 the Baháʼís of Edinburgh held an observance of World Religion Day at the Grosvenor Hotel, in Haymarket. The first Spiritual Assembly of Inverness was elected in April 1962. Gloria Faizi, wife of Abu'l-Qásim Faizi, was the first Baháʼí to visit the outlying islands of Shetland, such as Fetlar, Unst, Yell, Whalsay and the Out Skerries in 1964. The first Orcadian assembly was elected in Kirkwall in 1969, with four natives of Orkney. Its nine members were: Shezagh King, Daryoosh Mehrabi, Adele Senior, Jacqueline Mehrabi, Moira Macleod, Ernest Bertram, Parvin Jahanpour, Eric King, and Violet Bertram.

The first Baháʼí of Midlothian joined the religion in 1968.

Later, in 1969, Hand of the Cause Jalál Kházeh visited Scotland as far north as the Orkney Islands.

Harold and Betty Shepherd moved from Inverness to Uganda in 1972, where they helped run a primary school and renovate the Baháʼí House of Worship there. Following that service, the Shepherds moved back to Scotland, eventually to the Orkney Islands in 1976, where Harold died in 1980.

In 1972 the local assembly of the Baháʼís of Lerwick was first elected.

Alexe Cookson was born on the Isle of Harris, Outer Hebrides, Scotland, and about 1918 moved to New Zealand where she became a Baháʼí in 1964. She also went on pilgrimage and on the return trip went to Scotland where she died in Fort William.

In 1975 the assembly of Mull was first elected with members from the towns of Tobermory, Salen, and Kilchrenan, and from the island of Ulva.

In 1978 Scotland became the first part of the UK to recognize Baháʼí marriage ceremonies as legally binding.

In 1989 the Skye community received its first adult convert and in 1991 the first election of the Local Spiritual Assembly of Skye and Kyle of Lochalsh was held.

=== Interfaith and public activities ===
Baháʼí's are actively involved in interfaith relations in Scotland, and have been since the first Local Interfaith Group, Glasgow Sharing of Faiths, was established in the 1970s. The current Director of Interfaith Scotland, which is the National Interfaith Body in Scotland, is a Baháʼí. The Baháʼí community supports inter-religious dialogue through its collaboration with many Interfaith bodies, both nationally and internationally, including the UK Interfaith Network and its equivalents in other national communities world-wide, various UN bodies, The United Religions Initiative, and Religions for Peace.

Every year the First Minister of Scotland holds an Interfaith Summit with Bahá’í participation, not only to promote the contribution which the faith communities offer to Scottish society, but also to increase awareness of interfaith activity.

At the invitation of the Moderator of the General Assembly of the Church of Scotland in the winter of 2002–2003 an interfaith delegation from Scotland, including a member of the Baháʼí community, attended the Brussels European Union Commission and Parliament including Scottish MEPs. During the same year the Church of Scotland received representatives of the non-Christian faiths of Scotland at its 18 May General Assembly for the first time, as a result of a major theme of that year's Moderator, which was to progress interfaith dialogue in Scotland. Both the outgoing and incoming Moderators commented on the representatives of the religions that had been invited and attended: the Baháʼí, Buddhist, Jewish and Sikh faiths.

In 2005 the second Edinburgh International Festival of Middle Eastern Spirituality and Peace took place over an extended period from mid February to early March. Many performances and events were offered by Baháʼís in the proceedings including – a selection of The Hidden Words was set with music for viola, an event on "Tranquility Space" by the University of Edinburgh Baha'i Society, "The Baha'i Faith Exhibition", created originally for the St Mungo Museum of Religious Life and Art, a two-hour guided tour of some of the places where ʻAbdu'l-Bahá spoke at or visited in Edinburgh in 1913, and a talk by Baháʼí scholar Dr Moojan Momen.

On several occasions the Scottish Parliament has invited a Baháʼí to speak at its regular "Time for Reflection". Speakers invited have included Alex Reid, Carrie Varjavandi (2006), Allan Forsyth and Sean Afnan-Morrissey (2017). Carrie Varjavandi represented the Baháʼí Council for Scotland, and explained elements of the history and teachings of the religion. Sean Afnan-Morrissey was invited to mark the bicentenary of the birth of Bahá’u’lláh and in the same week the speaker of the Scottish Parliament, Ken McIntosh MSP hosted a reception in the Parliament for the Bahá’í Community and their friends.

In 2007 the Scottish Interfaith Council produced a booklet, Religion and Belief Matter: An Information Resource for Healthcare Staff, which reviews issues facing member religions, including the Baháʼí Faith, in medical care situations.

In 2009, the Baháʼí Faith was represented in the chaplaincy and spiritual care in NHS Scotland through its "Spiritual Care Development Committee".

=== Research in Glasgow ===
In 2005, tensions were noted among the religions of Glasgow especially following the September 11 attacks, but faith communities, including the Baháʼís, thought greater cooperation and outreach with Glasgow City Council was important while at the same time acknowledging some gaps in understanding coming from both sides. A university review of the situation in Glasgow, pointed out that the Baháʼís and Jews were the only religions in Glasgow giving a high priority to inter-faith work, resulting in representation above their proportion in the community, and that it was the Baháʼís who were able to assist the researchers in identifying participants from faith groups other than their own – and that such openness was a foundational quality of Baháʼís. The same research included a survey where 13 out of 14 Baháʼí respondents felt their community's inter-faith involvement was "about right" while most thought Glasgow City Council's involvement in inter-faith activities needed to expand. In 2005 an Inter-faith Liaison Officer for the City Council of Glasgow was piloted for three years to address issues of sectarianism and included the Baháʼí Faith as a contact point.

=== Youth activities ===
In 2003 the youth Baháʼí Workshop (see Oscar DeGruy) named "Northern Lights" toured many events in the year. The dance troupe disband in 2004 but at a civic "Drugs Awareness" event in Glasgow there was a video presentation which, unknown to the group, included the Northern Lights 'Drug Dance' and mentioned that Northern Lights were a Baháʼí youth group who were opposed to the drug culture. In November 2006, a junior youth group was registered with the government in Inverness – Ruhi Institutes have a section regarding adolescents about ages 12 to 15 and in this case it included a dance Baháʼí workshop on diversity.

"The History of the Baháʼí Faith in Orkney" was produced by a 13-year-old junior youth for the Orkney Heritage Society who was awarded her one of twelve runners-up places and a "Very Highly Commended" certificate.

Three junior youth groups were run by Baháʼís in Shetland in 2010.

=== Persecution of Baháʼís in Iran ===
From initiatives of Baháʼís and the considered opinions of leaders various individuals have spoken out about Iran's treatment of Baháʼís in Scotland.

In 1995 the spiritual assembly of the Baháʼís of Edinburgh welcomed Olya Roohìzadegan to the chaplaincy centre of the University of Edinburgh who addressed the audience on the martyrdom of Mona Mahmudnizhad she witnessed.

In 2010 a Dundee SNP MP, Stewart Hosie, called on British PM David Cameron to act on behalf of a group of Iranian prisoners who have been jailed for their religious beliefs. There was also coverage of the persecution on local TV news. Also in 2010, Cardinal O' Brien of the Roman Catholic Church issued a public statement in which he condemned Iran's treatment of Baháʼís:

"Having been united in prayer with seven Bahaʼi Leaders, who were arrested more than two years ago in Iran, I deeply regret the news that these leaders have now been sentenced to 20 years imprisonment.

I am happy to join in the recent statement issued by William Hague MP, Foreign Secretary, on this matter and regard what has happened as being a most appalling transgression of justice and at heart a gross violation of the human right of freedom of belief."

Indeed, at least one resident in Scotland had herself escaped after her husband was killed according to her own testimony, adding her voice to those of various international leaders.

=== Demographics ===
The Scottish community of Baháʼís numbered 421 people, 0.008% of the population of Scotland, according to the 2001 Census. Respondents had to use the "write in" section as it was not listed as an available choice. However across all of Scotland some householders were confused by the Census format or, for whatever reason, declined to follow its logic and the census does not measure religious activity or commitment, but overall was supported as "robust, reliable and – crucially – representative" according to a University of Glasgow study. Non-Christian religions are less strong in Scotland than in the rest of the UK but relatively speaking, the Baháʼís are better represented in Scotland than any other non-Christian community in proportion to its national community with 8% of its members living in Scotland. Indeed, the religion is recognized worldwide as the second-most geographically widespread religion after Christianity. This is partly because of their conscious effort to "pioneer" Scotland, by sending members there.

As of 2021 the elected Local Spiritual Assemblies of Scotland were: Dundee, Edinburgh, Glasgow, Stirling, Lerwick, Newton Mearns, Orkney Mainland East, and Skye Central.

The same University of Glasgow research included a focus providing a possible rough profile of the Glasgow Baháʼí community. Baháʼís returned a maximum of 24 surveys in the various rounds of surveys. And when done according to language preference most were done in English – 16 were in English and 8 in Persian – the native language of Iranians where both the religion originated and where Persecution of Baháʼís is well documented. Note also the only other group to report Persian returns was a women's group. The same research did a follow-up survey looking for ethnic breakdowns – 15 Baháʼí respondents included 6 from "Asian-Other" or "Mixed-Other".

In 2006 the regional community of Forth and Clyde was considered by Baháʼís to be the best developed of Scotland.

== See also ==
- Religion in Scotland
- Baháʼí Faith in England
- Baháʼí Faith in Wales
- Baháʼí Faith in Northern Ireland
- Baháʼí Faith in the United Kingdom
