= List of national radio programmes made in Manchester =

The following radio programmes were made for national radio in Manchester, England, mainly for the BBC national networks:

- 100% Human
- 2minuteTours
- 2005 Brain of Brighouse
- Another Fine Mess - 80 years of Laurel and Hardy
- Beyond Belief
- Brass Britain
- Counterpoint (radio)
- Cricklewood
- DEnergy
- Don't Laugh at Me
- Double Trouble
- Giving Way to a New Era
- Good Morning Sunday
- Hancock's Whole Evening
- Hed Kandi
- Housego's Unknowns
- How Aids Changed America
- Iconoclast
- I Got Up Out of My Seat
- I Have a Cunning Plan
- Jah Wobble's Musical Mystery Tour
- Jail Diaries of Sir Ralph Stanza
- John Wyndham: No Place Like Earth
- Laughter and Tears - The Les Dawson Story
- Left Bank of the Mind
- Lost In Music
- Loud'n'proud
- Mark and Lard
- Masterteam
- Mine's An 'Arf
- No Fixed Abode
- Out on Blue Six
- Pacific Ocean Blues: The Life and Death of Dennis Wilson
- Phill Jupitus's tribute to The Goodies
- Pick of the day
- Round Britain Quiz
- Salt 'n' Pepa - Push It
- Six Characters in Search of an Answer
- The In Crowd
- The Moral Maze
- The Palace of Laughter
- The Railway Children
- Theremin, Good Vibrations
- Thought for the Day
- We Interrupt This Programme
- What happened to the Working Class
- Woman's Hour
- You and Yours
