= Baháʼí Faith in Northern Ireland =

Baháʼí Faith in Northern Ireland begins after a century of contact between Irishmen and the Baháʼí Faith beyond the island and on the island. The members of the religion elected its first Baháʼí Local Spiritual Assembly in 1949 in Belfast. The Baháʼís held an international conference in Dublin in 1982 which was described as “…one of the very few occasions when a world event for a faith community has been held in Ireland". By 1993 there were a dozen assemblies in Northern Ireland. By 2005 Baháʼí sources claim some 300 Baháʼís across Northern Ireland.

== Early phase ==
The first contact between the Baháʼí Faith and Ireland known is with a doctor serving in Persia. He examined the Báb previous to his execution. Dr. McCormick – a man with Irish roots – later said the Bab had told him even Europeans would be following his religion some day.

Frederick D'Evelyn appears to have been the first Irishman to accept the Baháʼí Faith. He was born in Belfast in or about 1855 and joined the religion in 1901 and was present in California, in the United States, to welcome ʻAbdu'l-Bahá on his journeys to the West. Other Irish men and women also became Baháʼís early on. On 17 December 1912, Ahmad Sohrab, a secretary during ʻAbdu'l-Bahá's journeys, recorded a visitor to ʻAbdu'l-Bahá: "In Belfast, Ireland lives a fine Baháʼí, a splendid believer. She travelled all day and night to see the Master. He welcomed her most cordially and said: 'You must become the cause of the illumination of Ireland… you must ignite four thousand lamps in one year…'" It is likely this Baháʼí was Joan Waring who later moved to County Donegal.

Although there had been a Baháʼí, Stella Cairns, in Ballymena in the 1930s, and Philip Hainsworth, while in the army, had held the first fireside in Helens Bay in 1940, there were no Baháʼís in Northern Ireland by the late 1940s. After this the first Baháʼí pioneer to Northern Ireland was Charles Dunning, who came to Belfast in March 1948. Within ten weeks he was arranging the first public meetings, to which George Townshend and his son Brian came from Dublin to speak. He was followed by Ursula Newman (later Samandarí) in 1949. A review of Townshend's Promise of All Ages in a local newspaper in 1949 and chance encounters lead to a conversion. Robert Sloan was the first to become a Baháʼí in 1949. The first Baháʼí Local Spiritual Assembly of Northern Ireland was elected in Belfast in 1949–50, It celebrated its fiftieth anniversary at the Belfast Castle in 2000. Lisbeth Greeves from Australia officially joined the religion in 1954 in Northern Ireland but she had long association with the Baháʼís. Later she wrote plays and recorded tapes on the religion. Katherine Chauhan – daughter of an early Baháʼí in Northern Ireland – recalled the first Persian Baháʼís to pioneer to Northern Ireland were from Zoroastrian background and were determined to fit in and married Irish women.

== Growth ==
The first weekend schools in the British Isles were held in Belfast Castle in 1956. The first Irish Summer School was held in the Mourne Mountains. On 21 April 1959 the first local Spiritual assembly was elected in Bangor, in what later became part of 'North Down Borough'. Among the original members of that small community was Lady Kathleen Hornell (1890–1977), who had come over from England to live in Northern Ireland a few years earlier and then pioneered to Italy in 1960. Another distinguished member of that first small group was the late Grace Pritchard, who later went on receive an honour of an Order of the British Empire for her services in the field of education. Adib Taherzadeh was among those who arrived in Ireland in 1950 from Iran. He married Belfast-born Lesley.

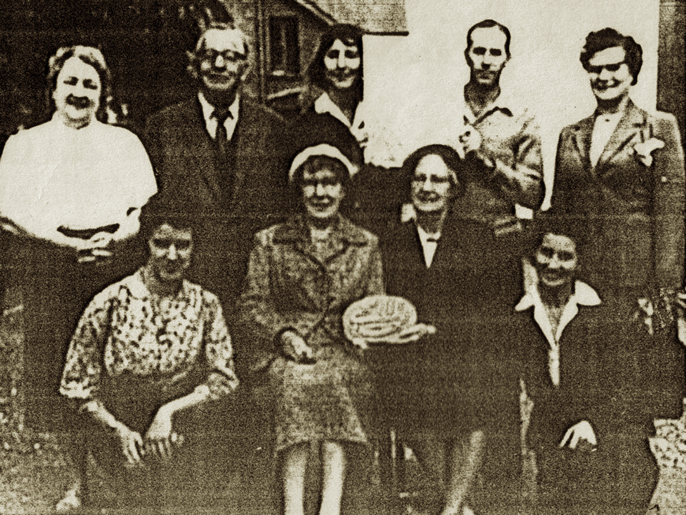

From the 1970s there were further developments. The first local assembly of the Baháʼís of Coleraine came into existence over a quarter of a century ago and at the University of Ulster there has been a Baháʼís Society tackling issues such as racism, prejudice, the gap between rich and poor and equality of men and women for just as long. The first assembly of the Baháʼís of Derry was elected in 1971.

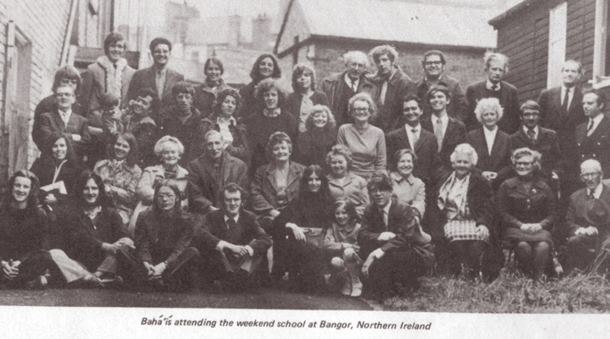

There have been Baháʼís in Magherafelt for almost a quarter of a century and issues related to reacting to the challenge of global warming and supporting a non-sectarian local school have played a role in the community.

In the early 1970s, the first local assembly was formed in Newtownabbey. The first local assembly of the Baháʼís of Craigavon which was formed on 2 April 1973. The first Baháʼís moved into the Ards district in the 1970s and the first local people to become members of the religion did so in 1978. In 1979 the first assembly for the Ards Peninsula was elected. World Religion Day has been observed in Omagh every year since 1984.

Katherine Chauhan returned to Northern Ireland after pioneering to several countries and was married in the first Baháʼí wedding in Ballymena.

The Baháʼí Council for Northern Ireland facilitates publishing a newsletter CommuNIqué, operates under the National Spiritual Assembly of the United Kingdom, regularly consults with the National Assembly of the Baháʼís of the Republic of Ireland and has released a series of statements about concerns in the area since 2003.

=== Involvements ===
Since its inception the religion has had involvement in socio-economic development beginning by giving greater freedom to women, promulgating the promotion of female education as a priority concern, and that involvement was given practical expression by creating schools, agricultural coops, and clinics. The religion entered a new phase of activity when a message of the Universal House of Justice dated 20 October 1983 was released. Baháʼís were urged to seek out ways, compatible with the Baháʼí teachings, in which they could become involved in the social and economic development of the communities in which they lived. World-wide in 1979 there were 129 officially recognised Baháʼí socio-economic development projects. By 1987, the number of officially recognised development projects had increased to 1482. The Association of Baháʼí Women (Northern Ireland) is a body working under the auspices of the Baháʼí Council for Northern Ireland and has developed and piloted by a group of Baháʼí women from Lurgan and Coleraine. There is also a Belfast branch of the Association of Baháʼí Women. In 2002 the group offered a seminar at The Rural College and Derrynoid Centre in Draperstown.

The Baháʼís were noted as making a small but significant contribution during the conflict in Northern Ireland. During the Opsahl Commission before the cease-fires twelve Baháʼí groups or individuals made submissions. Baháʼí women have been involved with women's organisations that were primarily concerned with anything to do with women and children. As Baháʼís they also talked about peace in the global sense, hoping that "some of this has filtered through".

The Cookstown Baha'i Community is the home of "The Moving Hour" on Townland Radio 828. R. Jackson Armstrong-Ingram was second generation Baháʼí from Belfast and worked for years as an archivist and uncovered some of the earliest history of the Baháʼís of Ireland as well as composing music and writing other books.

== Current situation ==
=== Contacts with society at large ===
The Northern Ireland community has taken some note of the Baháʼís. The Baháʼís held an international conference in Dublin in 1982 which was described as “…one of the very few occasions when a world event for a faith community has been held in Ireland". The Baháʼís of Northern Ireland have organised a community choir in 1992 which came in second in the a capella section of choir contests in the Belfast Music Festival in 1997. The Belfast Telegraph has recorded a number reports of the religion since at least 1999. In 2000 it posted the obituary of Adib Taherzadeh, a former member of the Universal House of Justice, the supreme governing council of the Baha'i Faith. The Baháʼís of Assembly of Londonderry was awarded a "Quaypin" by the Mayor of Derry in 2001. In 2004 Lesley Taherzadeh visited in 2004 and gave a talk about life in Israel. The Belfast Telegraph printed the Baha'i Council for Northern Ireland issuing its New Year's message, as well as a Baháʼí point of view on Christmas. The Omagh library has materials on the community and a Belfast Telegram contributor visited and noted the Baháʼí Lotus Temple in India. There have been public events offered as well. A member of the Voices of Bahá Choir offered an impromptu concert during a stay in Magherafelt at the home of local members Mahin and Les Gornall. The choir, a troupe of some 400, have performed with world class orchestras and given concerts in places as far apart as Moscow, New York, Budapest and Berlin. The first legally recognised Baha'i marriage in Northern Ireland has taken place in Cullybackey between Carmen Zambrana Candel and John Twiname in 2004.

Meanwhile, Baháʼís have continued to hold private vacation/seasonal schools as well as supporting schools in the community. The Baha'i community in Coleraine hosted its Summer School in 2001 while the annual Northern Ireland Baha'i Summer School was held in Portrush. The school brought together people not just from all over Ireland and Britain but from Germany, Norway, Greece, New Zealand, Israel, and the United States. A specially welcomed guest speaker was Leslie Taherazedeh, originally from Belfast, now living in the Israel, who spoke on the subject of pilgrimage. Colin Palin, a 19-year-old information technology student at Magee, gave a detailed presentation at an event in at Craigavad. He spoke about how computer technology can be used as a means of communicating and sharing ideas with others.

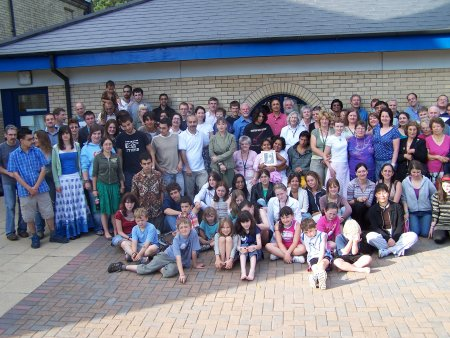

Concern of school curriculum addressing religion was a raised concern circa 2001 by the Northern Ireland Inter-Faith Forum. In 2003 the Baháʼí Council for Northern Ireland made a presentation to the Churches' Religious Education Core Syllabus Review Working Party onProposals for religious education in Grant-Aided Schools and welcomed the changes in 2006. In 2003 a reporter for the Belfast Telegraph read a feature on a Baháʼí school in Belfast. "Every Sunday morning for the past 15 years, children have been travelling across Northern Ireland to attend a Sunday School in Belfast. They come from towns as far apart as Rostrevor, Magherafelt and Lurgan ... the school has a curriculum that has been refined over the years and is based on Baha'i principles, teaching the unity of religions, and the unity of humanity. The school is named after the famous Irish Protestant clergyman George Townshend, who became a Baha'i." The reporter's comments brought a touch of controversy in response. The 2010 "Northern Ireland Summer School" is set to take place again at Lorne centre.

Baháʼís have contacted leading political figures. In 2006 Patrick McCarthy, Lord Mayor of Belfast in 2006, received a Baháʼí delegation. The Speaker of the Northern Ireland Assembly Eileen Bell has welcomed members of the Baha'i religious community in Ireland to a special reception in Parliament Buildings for the first time. Some 150 members toured the Assembly Chamber on Saturday evening and held a short religious service in the Senate Chamber.

Most recently the Baháʼí Council for Northern Ireland spoke out in support of the Hidden Crimes Secret Pain report of the Sexual Violence Unit of the Department of Health, Social Services and Public Safety and responded to questions the government asked for comment on.

=== Baháʼí functions ===
Baháʼís have continued to interact with the Baháʼí administration. In 2001 sometime writer and artist George Fleming and quiltmaker Marion Khosravi represented Northern Ireland Baháʼís at the opening of the Terraces of the Baháʼí Gardens on the slopes of Mount Carmel out of more than 3,500 pilgrims from around the world for the ceremony. In 2002 Londonderry man, Dr. Keith Munro, was appointed chairman of the Baháʼí Council for Northern Ireland. The Council then held its first ever meeting in Londonderry in 2003. In 2003 and 2006 Baháʼí followers from across Northern Ireland went to Belfast to meet with the National Spiritual Assembly of the United Kingdom which meets regularly to oversee and administer the affairs of the community. Dr Iain Palin was a delegate from Foyle and returned from a UK-wide conference at the National Convention of the Baháʼís of the United Kingdom held in Wales. At a report of the events Dr. Palin shared about a showing of a new DVD about the Gardens of the World Centre of the religion in Israel. Among the current assemblies are: Belfast, Coleraine, Derry, Magherafelt, Newtownabbey, Newtownards, and Omagh.

=== Demographics ===
In 1993 there were twelve local spiritual assemblies in Northern Ireland. Baháʼí assemblies and communities are organised in four clusters – multi-community groupings – in Northern Ireland. There are just over a hundred Baháʼís in the Charles Dunning Cluster, (centred on Belfast,) – all of whom had finished Book 1 of the Ruhi Institute series by the fall of 2005. By 2005 Baháʼí sources claim some 300 Baháʼís across Northern Ireland.

== See also ==
- History of Northern Ireland
- Religion in Northern Ireland
- Category:Irish Baháʼís
- Baháʼí Faith in the United Kingdom
- Baháʼí Faith in England
- Baháʼí Faith in Wales
- Baháʼí Faith in Scotland
