= Moral Maze =

BBC Radio 4 discussion programme

- Title card from TV series
- Genre: Individual cross examinations of successive witnesses by a group of panellists on live radio
- Running time: 45 mins
- Country of origin: UK
- Language: English
- Home station: BBC Radio 4
- Hosted by: Michael Buerk
- Created by: Ernie Rea
- Produced by: Dan Tierney (BBC Religion & Ethics)
- Recording studio: BBC Manchester
- Original release: 20 August 1990
- Website: Website

Moral Maze is a live discussion programme on BBC Radio 4, broadcast since 1990. Since November 2011, it has also been available as a podcast.

== Structure ==
Four regular panellists discuss moral and ethical issues raised by a recent news story. Michael Buerk delivers a preamble launching the topic, then a series of "witnesses" – experts or other relevant people – are questioned by the panellists, who then discuss what each witness said.

== Panellists ==
As of 2025, the regular panellists are:

- Nazir Afzal
- Andrew Doyle
- Giles Fraser
- Nesrine Malik
- Anne McElvoy
- Ash Sarkar
- Mona Siddiqui
- Lord Jonathan Sumption
- Tim Stanley
- Matthew Taylor
- Inaya Folarin Iman

Notable former panellists include Rabbi Hugo Gryn, Janet Daley, Melanie Phillips, Edward Pearce, Geoffrey Robertson, Michael Mansfield, politician Michael Gove, Claire Fox, Michael Portillo, Ian Hargreaves, Kenan Malik, scientist Steven Rose, philosophers Simon Blackburn, Roger Scruton, and Galen Strawson, and historian David Starkey, who often attracted controversy for his blunt manner.

== History ==
The first edition was broadcast at 11:00 on Monday 20 August 1990 and was forty minutes long. It was made by the Factual Unit of Religious Programmes (later called Factual Programmes Religion) at BBC North in Manchester. It was hoped that the programme format would involve the panellists' views being revised during the course of a programme, but this rarely happened.

In April 1991 it moved to Tuesdays and was broadcast between 9:00 and 9:45. In July 1991 it moved to Fridays and was broadcast between 20:05 and 20:50, replacing Any Questions? for the summer recess. There was then a repeat at 13:00 the following Saturday and a phone-in from 14:00 to 14:30, replacing Any Answers?. There was also an end-of-year programme. In July 1992, it moved to Thursday mornings at 9:00. It became a de rigueur listen for Westminster MPs. By 1997, it was fifty-five minutes long, lasting until 10:00. It moved to Wednesday evenings from 13 May 1998 with a repeat of the forty-five-minute programme on Saturday nights at 22:15.

Michael Buerk has presented the programme since its inception. Cover presenters have included David Aaronovitch, Edward Stourton and William Crawley.

Originally produced at the BBC North West's New Broadcasting House on Oxford Road in Manchester, the programme production base is Salford Quays. The programme is broadcast live from BBC Broadcasting House in London.

=== TV pilot ===
A television version was broadcast on BBC2 on Saturday 10 September 1994 as a trial series of six 45-minute-long programmes broadcast around midnight, perhaps influenced by Channel 4's successful late-night discussion programme After Dark. The pilot had audiences of around 1.3 million. The final television episode was broadcast on 15 October 1994, at 23:00.

== Criticism ==
In his book Bad Thoughts (US title Crimes Against Logic), libertarian philosopher Jamie Whyte, who has been a witness on the programme, advises readers to listen to the Moral Maze for "innumerable examples of faulty reasoning". Journalist and author Nick Cohen has also criticised the programme, in a piece highlighting the media careers of Trotskyite-turned-libertarian former cadres of the Revolutionary Communist Party, centred on Spiked magazine.

On 2 April 2021, Scottish broadcaster Lesley Riddoch criticised the programme for taking an approach where observers and experts would discuss a particular issue without the actual participants being part of the discussion. Riddoch also stated that the programme was "too selective, elitist and abstract".

== See also ==
- List of national radio programmes made in Manchester
- The Choice – radio series
- Heart of the Matter – BBC One programme presented by Joan Bakewell
