= Ethel Jenner Rosenberg =

English Baháʼí

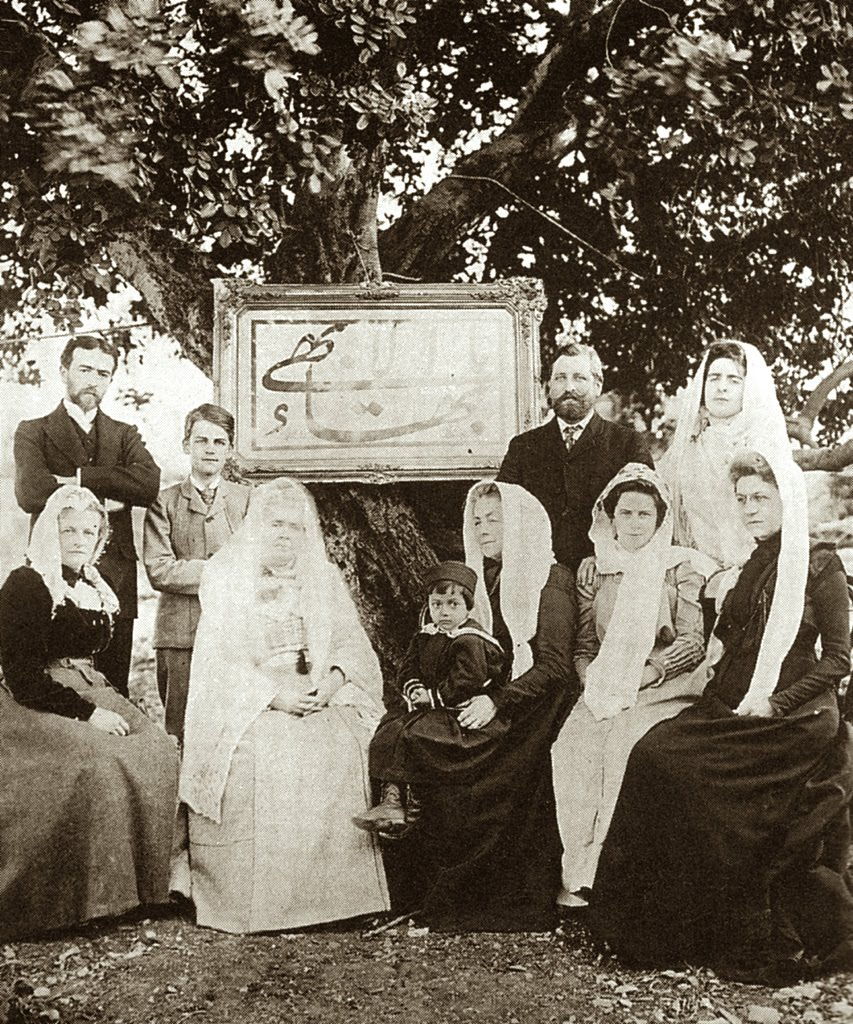
Early Western Baháʼí pilgrims. Standing left to right: Charles Mason Remey, Sigurd Russell, Edward Getsinger and Laura Clifford Barney; Seated left to right: Ethel Jenner Rosenberg, Madam Jackson, Shoghi Effendi, Helen Ellis Cole, Lua Getsinger, Emogene Hoagg

Ethel Jenner Rosenberg (6 August 1858 – 17 November 1930) became the first English Baháʼí.

Rosenberg became a Baháʼí when she converted in 1899, after having been introduced to the Baháʼí Faith by Mary Thornburgh-Cropper, an American resident in London who had converted in 1898. Rosenberg was born in the city of Bath, Somerset, to a Jewish family and was a painter trained at the Slade School of Fine Art in London. She was ʻAbdu'l-Bahá's social secretary during his visits to London. ʻAbdu'l-Bahá asked her, among others, to give consideration to publishing Baháʼí books, which resulted in the publication of ʻAbdu'l-Bahá in London and A Brief Account of the Bahai Movement. Rosenberg also assisted Laura Clifford Barney in compiling Some Answered Questions and Lady Blomfield in compiling Paris Talks.

Rosenberg traveled to America three times, initially doing so with Mírzá Abu'l-Faḍl and Laura Clifford Barney. She would spend many months in the United States and stayed with Phoebe Hearst.

Rosenberg made three pilgrimages to Haifa, in 1904, 1909 and 1921. When she arrived in Haifa for her third pilgrimage, in 1921, she found that ʻAbdu'l-Bahá had recently died. Remaining in Haifa, she greeted Lady Blomfield, Shoghi Effendi, and Shoghi Effendi's sister Ruhangiz when the three arrived from England on 29 December 1921. Shoghi Effendi gave her instructions for the calling of the first National Spiritual Assembly of England, on which she would serve.
