= Edict of Toleration (1844) =

On 21 March 1844, the Sublime Porte of the Ottoman Empire submitted a note to the British and French embassies promising to cease the executions of apostates from Islam. In the Baháʼí Faith, this is known as the Edict of Toleration and has a prophetic significance.

== Background ==
The edict took place during the process referred to as the Eastern Question in relations between European powers, Britain in particular, and the Ottoman Empire. This time was referred to in the empire as Tanzimat, which included other initiatives like ending the Ottoman slave trade. It was largely a result of pressure from the British government to stop the persecution of Christians. Tanzimat was an Ottoman reform process that sought equal protection under the law in Ottoman lands for all people; however, it did not address matters of religious freedom. In 1843 two incidents garnered international controversy, leading to death sentences for an Armenian Ottoman subject and a Greek national. This led to the Edict in March 1844. Reverend Edward Bickersteth referred to these developments in 1844 when he summarized diplomatic notes (Note: The original notes of the diplomatic letter noting this edict can be obtained from the Public Record Office in London. A translation of the edict, an acknowledgement from Stratford Canning, 1st Viscount Stratford de Redcliffe to the Sublime Porte, and an accompanying letter from Canning, dated 23 March 1844, is in Foreign Office, Turkey, FO78/555/No.49. There are several other letters from Canning in the same volume on the question of the religious intolerance of the Turks. The draft of a letter from the Foreign Office, dated 16 January 1844, which made plain the attitude of the British government and which provided the direct impetus for the negotiations leading eventually to the issue of the edict, is in FO78/552/No. 4.) presented to the British Parliament noting "The correspondence occupied a considerable part of the year—from Aug. 27, 1843, to April 19, 1844."

== Note (edict) ==
In February 1844 there is a question on the status of Jew apostates from Islam (who, it was claimed, must pass through being Christian on the way to Islam in the first place) and on March 21, 1844, appears (in translation):

It is the special and constant intention of His Highness the Sultan that his cordial relations with the High Powers be preserved, and that a perfect reciprocal friendship be maintained and increased.
The Sublime Porte engage to take effectual measures to prevent henceforward the execution and putting to death of the Christian who is an apostate.

According to Muslim Islamic scholar Cyril Glassé, death for apostasy in Islam was "not in practice enforced" in later times in the Muslim world, and was "completely abolished" by "a decree of the Ottoman government in 1260AH/1844AD." This short edict was advanced in the wider Ottoman Reform Edict of 1856.

== Prophetic interpretations ==
The Edict was seen by some especially among the religious as a specific sign leading towards the fulfillment of prophecy.

Research conducted by Michael Sours into this subject and the records of the development of the Edict did not refer directly to the Jews but rather infers religious tolerance through ending executions for apostasy for Jews that seemed to convert making their social situation easier while actually keeping their personal and group identity in their Judaic religion. Jerusalem has had the largest Jewish population in Palestine in recent centuries since about 1844 and been majority Jewish since about 1852.

The Edict was first publicly commented upon by Reverend Edward Bickersteth in his publication, Practical Guide to the Prophecies in the 1844 edition. Adventist William Miller, and those that disagreed with him, though unaware of the Edict and the diplomacy around it, still looked to the fortunes of the Ottoman Empire even in the period. Miller pointed to the year because of the 2300 day prophecy of Daniel 8:14, relying on the Day-year principle. The 2300 days are understood to represent 2300 years stretching from 457 BC, the calculated starting date of the 70 weeks prophecy based on the 3rd decree found in Ezra, thus leading to 1843/4. Bickersteth acknowledged the same interpretation and added a second - Ezekiel 4:5 - as a parallel to start the clock for understanding Revelation 9:15; taking 390 years as a period for persecution of Christians in the End time. Bickersteth takes this persecution from the triumph of Ottoman rule of Constantinople in 1453, thus 1453+390 is 1843/4, directly before these events. Thus, independently of Miller, a number of Christian authors followed the significance of this declaration from Bickersteth including Alfred Edersheim, a Jewish convert to Christianity and a Biblical scholar, and Henry Grattan Guinness who broadened the themes of the understanding of the edict and its importance, and into the early 20th century with Worth Smith who mentioned it in his 1934 Miracle of the Ages. Adventist mention of the Edict wasn't until 1917.

Thornton Chase, commonly recognized as the first convert to the Baháʼí Faith of Occidental background, noted the Edict in his publication The Bahai Revelation published in 1909. An Irish convert to the religion, George Townshend was the first broadly published to mention the Edict in Baháʼí literature in 1944 when he wrote:

The proclamation of His Faith was made in 1844, the year when the strict exclusion of the Jews from their own land enforced by the Muslims for some twelve centuries was at last relaxed by the Edict of Toleration and "the times of the Gentiles" were "fulfilled."

in the introduction to Shoghi Effendi's book, God Passes By, published in 1944. This was also centrally mentioned by William Sears in his book Thief in the Night originally published in 1961 and in its 17th edition circa 2012. Both Townshend and Sears had high offices in the religion as Hands of the Cause.

== See also ==
- Massacres of Badr Khan
- Demographics of Palestine
- Balfour Declaration
