= Frederick D'Evelyn =

Frederick W. D'Evelyn (c. 1855 – 1932) appears to have been the first person of Irish birth to accept the Baháʼí Faith. He was born in Belfast in or about 1855.

== Early life ==
Information about his early life is scanty. It is known that he qualified in medicine at the University of Edinburgh, Scotland, and subsequently served in a medical capacity with the British army in the South African campaigns, being wounded in 1887.

He emigrated to the United States and settled in San Francisco, where his career blossomed. He held a faculty position at the University of California and was president of the California Academy of Sciences. He was also active in civic matters and served as president of the Geographical Society of California and of the Audubon Society of the Pacific Coast.

== Life as a Baháʼí ==
In 1901 D'Evelyn became a Baháʼí, and he served the faith for the rest of his life. He was in the party (along with Helen Goodall, Ellen Cooper, and Mr and Mrs W. C. Ralston) that officially welcomed ʻAbdu'l-Bahá on his arrival in San Francisco in October 1912, and his name appears first of the list of recipients of a tablet from the Master published in Star of the West on 19 January 1915. D'Evelyn's account of the historic meeting is reproduced in Marion Carpenter Yazdi's Youth in the Vanguard which describes his involvement in Baháʼí activities a number of times. His service is mentioned in other books, such as Mahmúd's Diary and Leroy Ioas - Hand of the Cause of God by Anita Ioas Chapman, and he appears a number of times in Star of the West, sometimes referred to as "Frederick W. Evelyn". In addition to his local position he was a member of the Temple Unity Board, the forerunner of the National Spiritual Assembly. He was also a close friend of John David Bosch, for whom Bosch Baháʼí School is named.

In August 1932 he died after a brief illness and was interred at Cypress Lawn Memorial Park. The Spiritual Assembly of the Baháʼís of San Francisco expressed its "grief and sense of serious loss" and paid tribute to "the untiring services and inspiring leadership of their first Chairman, Dr Frederick W. D'Evelyn".

== See also ==
- Baháʼí Faith in Northern Ireland
