= George Townshend (Baháʼí) =

Irish Anglican clergyman (1876–1957)

George Townshend (June 14, 1876 – March 25, 1957) was born in Ireland and was a well-known writer and Anglican clergyman who converted to the Baháʼí Faith at age 70. Baháʼí leader Shoghi Effendi named Townshend a Hand of the Cause of God and one of the United Kingdom's three luminaries of the Baháʼí Faith.

== Early accomplishments ==
Townshend went to the University of Oxford for a time, then returned to Ireland where he was a lead writer for The Irish Times from 1900 to 1904. In 1904 he emigrated to the United States and was ordained in Salt Lake City. He then went to Sewanee, Tennessee, where he became Associate Professor of English at the University of the South.

== Return to Ireland ==
Townshend spent many years near Ballinasloe, County Galway, where he was incumbent of Ahascragh and Archdeacon of Clonfert. Around this time he achieved recognition with "The Alter on the Hearth (1927)" and more widely with "The Genius of Ireland (1930)". He then moved to Dublin where he became a Canon of St. Patrick's Cathedral. However, this lasted for only a short time before his resignation.

== Baháʼí life ==
In 1918, Townshend started correspondence with ʻAbdu'l-Bahá, the leader of the Baháʼí Faith. Townshend then adopted the Baháʼí teachings within his work as an Anglican clergyman, including his writing of two books, The Heart of the Gospel and The Promise of All Ages. This created increasing tensions between Townshend and other clergy and eventually caused Shoghi Effendi, the succeeding leader of the Baháʼí Faith, to call for Townshend to resign as a Canon of St. Patrick's Cathedral.

In 1947, at the age of 70, Townshend renounced his Anglican orders and wrote a pamphlet to all Christians under the title The Old Churches and the New World Faith, which was sent to 10,000 people in the British Isles on the occasion of his resignation. He then moved to a small bungalow outside of Dublin where he spent his last decade. Townshend was one of the founding members of the Dublin Local Spiritual Assembly and in 1951 was designated by Shoghi Effendi, then head of the religion, as a Hand of the Cause of God. With this designation he rendered many services to the religion, mainly in the area of writing, as Shoghi Effendi thought of him as "the best writer we have ... the pre-eminent Baháʼí writer". Townshend wrote the introduction the book God Passes By which recounted the events of the first century of the Baháʼí faith. In the introduction he was the first Baháʼí to mention the 1844 Edict of Toleration. Townshend also completed another book, Christ and Baháʼu'lláh, which Shoghi Effendi called "his crowning achievement" shortly before Townshend died from Parkinson's disease in 1957 at the age of 81.

== Family ==
George had a wife Nancy, a son Brian and a daughter Una. Una and Brian helped him to write "Christ and Baháʼu'lláh" by writing down his dictations as he was dying from Parkinson's. Brian died in 1988 and Una in 2003. Una married Richard "Dick" Dean, Baháʼí and one time Harlem Globetrotter, she also was a founding member of the Dublin Local Spiritual Assembly as well as a Knight of Baháʼu'lláh, a designation given to those Baháʼís who were the first to reside in a country, hers being Malta.

== Works ==
Shoghi Effendi once said about George Townshend that he feels "Mr. Townshend's services to the Faith can best be rendered by his writing about it, as he obviously has an outstanding ability in this direction..." (The Unfolding Destiny of the British Baha'i Community, p. 198).

- Townshend, George (1966). Christ and Baháʼu'lláh. Oxford, UK: George Ronald. ISBN 0-85398-005-5.

Christ and Baháʼu'lláh is notable for the changes made from the original publication to subsequent editions published after the passing of Shoghi Effendi. For example, a statement about the "first and present Guardian" has been removed and a section discussing "the lineage of succeeding Guardians" has been replaced with a section discussing "divinely guided institutions" in general.

- Townshend, George (1957). Abdu'l-Baha: The Master. Oxford, UK: George Ronald. ISBN 0-85398-253-8.
- Townshend, George (1951) [1939]. Heart of the Gospel, The. Oxford, UK: George Ronald. ISBN 0-85398-020-9.
- Townshend, George (1972) [1948]. Promise of All Ages, The. Oxford, UK: George Ronald. ISBN 0-85398-044-6.
