= Baháʼí Faith in Wales =

Spiritual movement in the United Kingdom

The Baháʼí Faith in Wales started shortly after the Second World War when a great pioneer movement began with sixty percent of the British Baháʼí community eventually relocating. This movement included taking the Baháʼí Faith to Wales.

The first Baháʼí resident in Wales was Rose Jones who married and moved to Cardiff from London in 1942. In 1947 she was joined by Joan Giddings. In 1948 the first local spiritual assembly of Cardiff was formed. In 1961 Pontypridd formed the first Baháʼí Local Spiritual Assembly composed entirely of native Welsh. The first Baháʼí literature in the Welsh language was published in 1950. Today there are local assemblies in Cardiff, Newport and Swansea. In 2017 it was reported that there were about 200 Welsh followers of the faith. In the 2021 UK Census, 223 people in Wales reported their faith as Baháʼí.

The 2005 UK-wide conference of the National Convention of the Baháʼís of the United Kingdom was held in Wales.

The Wales Baháʼís are organized under the Baháʼí Council of Wales under the National Spiritual Assembly of the Baháʼís of the United Kingdom. In 2007 there were registered communities in: Abercarn, Caerphilly, Carmarthen, Carmarthenshire, Chepstow, Conwy, Llanelli Rural, Llanelli Town, Maesteg, Mold, Monmouthshire, Newport, and Vale of Glamorgan.

== See also ==
- History of Wales
- Baháʼí Faith in England
- Baháʼí Faith in Scotland
- Baháʼí Faith in Northern Ireland
