= Thomas Breakwell =

British Baha'i

Thomas Breakwell (1872–1902) was the first Englishman to enter the Baháʼí Faith and the first to make the pilgrimage to Acre, Israel (a.k.a. ʻAkká). He was also the first western Baháʼí to give the Huqúqu'lláh "Right of God", a voluntary contribution to the head of the religion and considered a way to purify one's possessions. He was taught the Baháʼí Faith by May Bolles (later to become May Maxwell) while on vacation in the summer of 1901 in Paris, then immediately went on a pilgrimage to meet ʻAbdu'l-Bahá (eldest son of Bahá'u'lláh, founder of the Faith and His appointed successor) in ʻAkká that same summer. At ʻAbdu'l-Bahá's request, Breakwell took up permanent residence in Paris, where he worked enthusiastically to teach the religion and help develop the Paris Baháʼí community. Thomas Breakwell died of tuberculosis on 13 June 1902, less than one year after joining the religion.

From the Baháʼí perspective, the significance of Thomas Breakwell's life lies not in his material or professional accomplishments, but rather in his spiritual capacity. His purity, detachment and intense devotion were noted by a number of those who met him, most significantly and most keenly by ʻAbdu'l-Bahá. In 1955 Shoghi Effendi, then head of the religion, lauded Breakwell as one of the United Kingdom's three luminaries of the Baháʼí Faith.

== Early life ==
=== Born and raised ===
Thomas J. Breakwell was born on 31 May 1872, in the town of Woking in southern England, and was the youngest of five children. His father, Edward Breakwell, sold domestic ironware and was an herbalist. In the 1860s Thomas' father had joined the Primitive Methodist church and it is almost certain that this was the religious tradition that Thomas was exposed to while growing up. Thomas was educated in a public school.

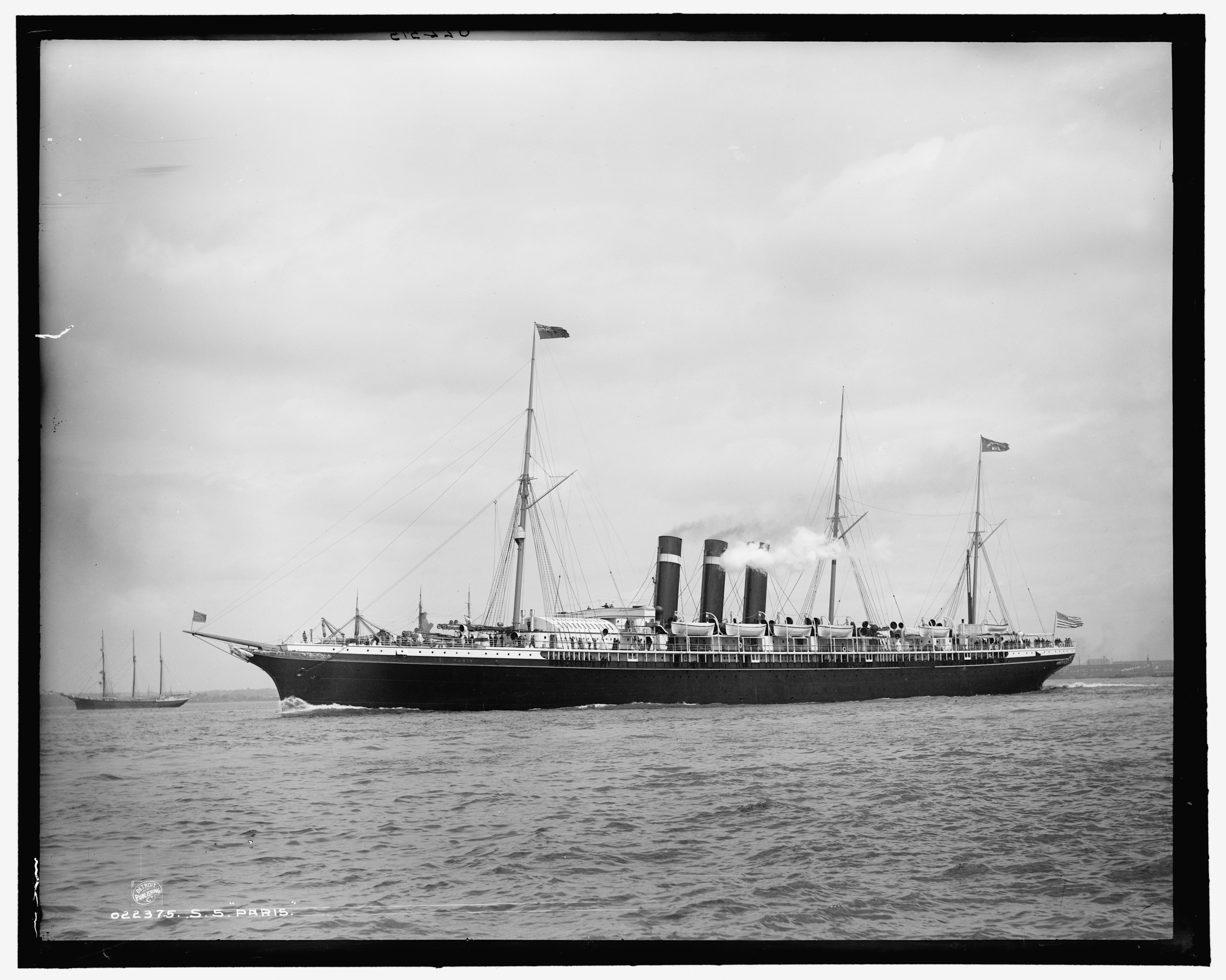
The SS City of Paris in the mid 1890s

=== United States ===
About 1888/9 Breakwell immigrated to the United States. Breakwell testified it was in May 1888 but a passenger manifest for the SS City of Paris shows him arriving 8 May 1889, in New York city bound for Illinois at age 16 arriving with 8 pieces of luggage as a second cabin passenger.

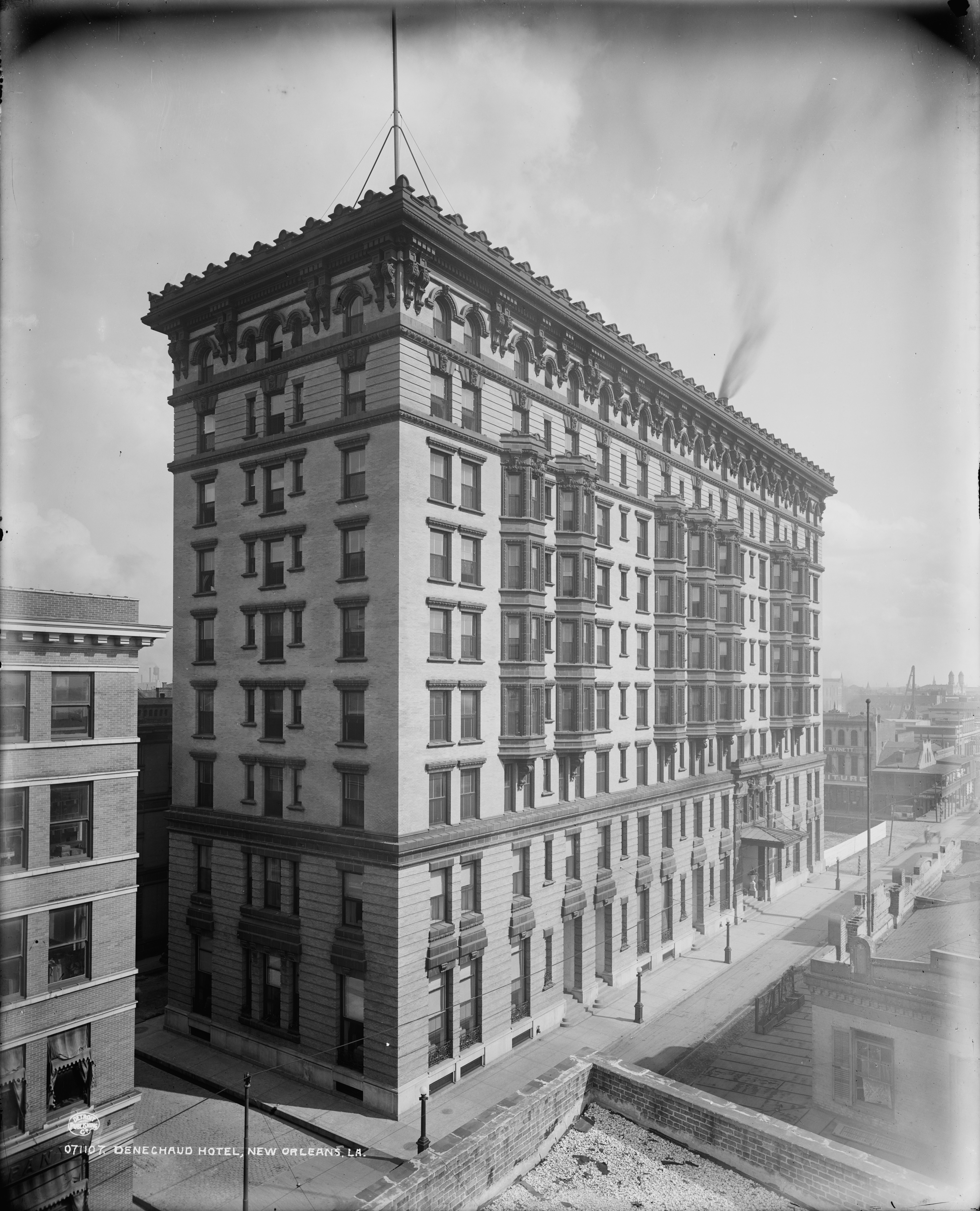
Denechaud Hotel circa 1900

He later testified he lived in Chicago two years and then moved to New Orleans, around the time of the 1892 New Orleans general strike and the 1893 Cheniere Caminada hurricane. Amidst the New Orleans of the 1890s, Breakwell appears staying at the Hotel Denechaud "from Chicago" in September, 1893.

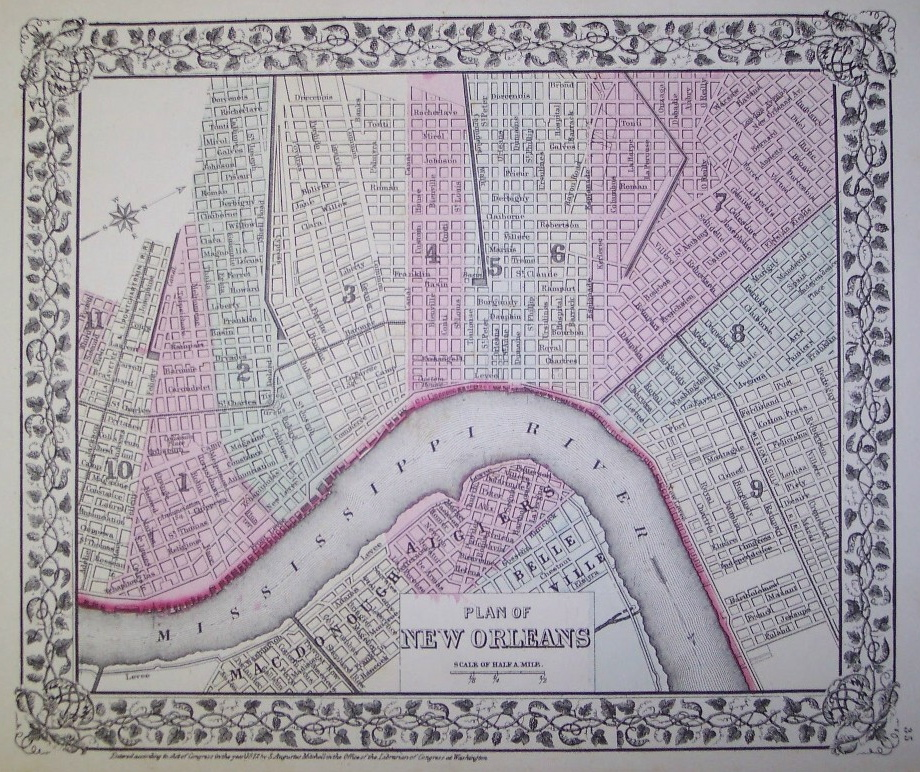
Carondelet crosses Ward 1 and 2

He does not appear in the city directory until 1894. It shows him employed with Flower, King & Putnam at 214 Gravier and residing at 212 Carondelet, both in downtown New Orleans. The Flower, of Flower, King & Putnam, was Walter C. Flower.

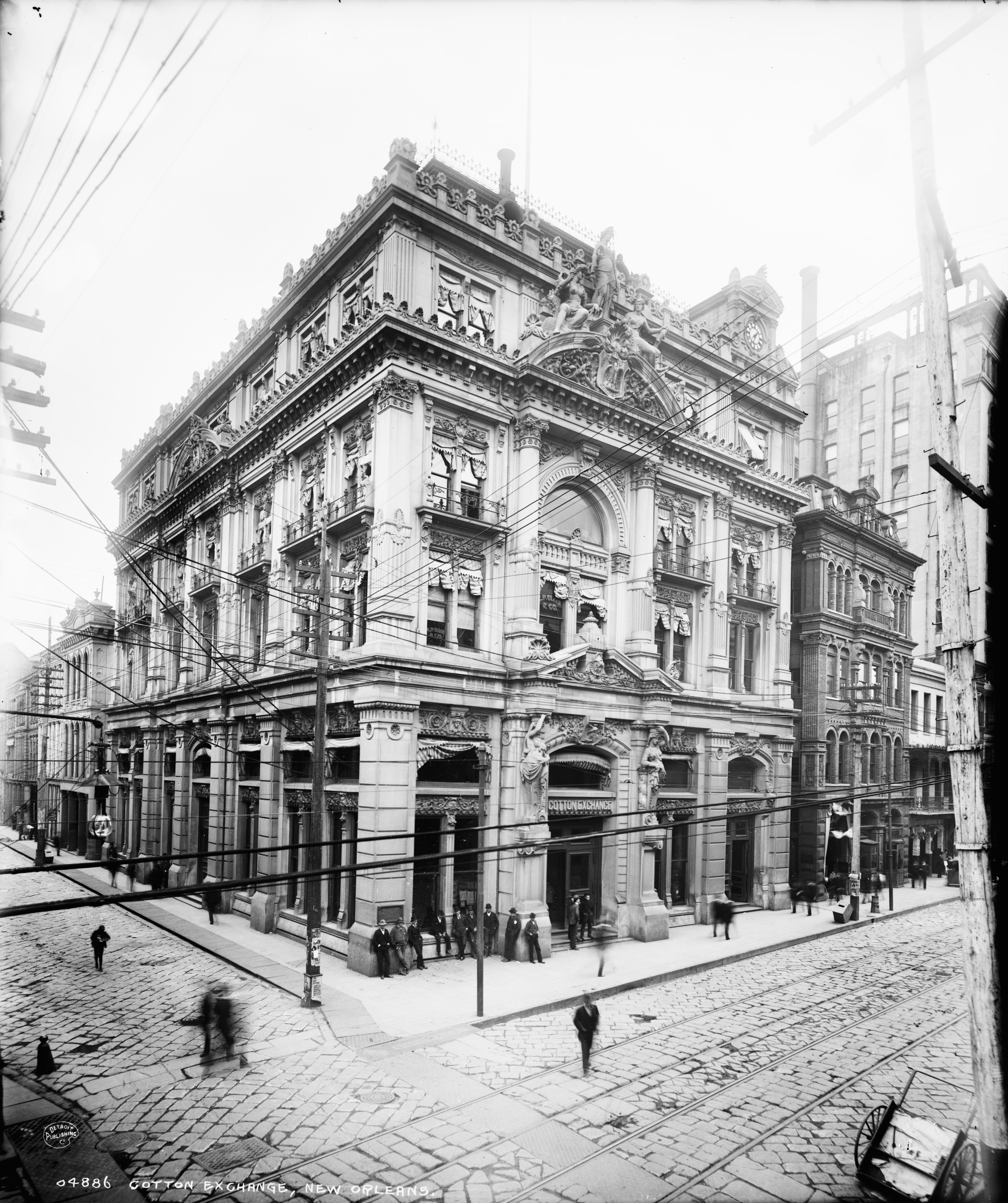
The New Orleans Cotton Exchange building c. late 1890s

Flower was of a plantation family which was in cotton production and who was also involved with the March 14, 1891 New Orleans lynchings of 11 Italians and would go on to be mayor of New Orleans from 1896 to 1900. The intersection of Gravier and Carondelet was the New Orleans Cotton Exchange. Breakwell would later remark that his employment depended on the trade of cotton and child labor such as in the textile mills of the time at which he felt sorrow.

1894 would also mark some concerns of Breakwell mentioned in later years – it is uncertain if he knew of these developments at the time which led him to further explorations later or if they were just not mentioned or if he forgot these had happened. First there was an article on the Baháʼí Faith published in The Times-Picayune in later January outlining the religion in positive terms and spoken of on the basis of the memorial of the death of Baháʼu'lláh. The source is not stated but he was staying at the Hotel Royal. It might have been one of the new boarders published a few days before. The article was echoed in other newspapers in the country for months. Accounts of his interests later do mention theosophy, (though which kind of it, is not defined.) 1894 was the year of new activity of theosophy in New Orleans. In February Anna Eva Fay came to town, followed by Constance Wachtmeister, and on 1 May an association was formed, which began to hold meetings, and advertise. It is not stated when this happened in later accounts but Breakwell reported that there was a three-month period when he felt "I was continually in communion with God." Regardless, late in 1894 Breakwell was visible at a Christmas party of the Sunbeam Club as the "ideal" Santa Claus. Breakwell was similarly visible in the city directory in 1895, and the earlier article about the Sunbeam Club article repeated. The 1895 New Orleans dockworkers riot took place that spring. Breakwell is also noted taking a return trip from England on the SS New York in August classified as a stenographer. This position with Flower, King & Putnam allowed him enough income and vacation time to visit his family in England and to travel in Europe.

While Flower served in office as mayor, Breakwell sought and received US citizenship the same day 16 June 1898. One of the witnesses produced to vouch for Breakwell was John S. Waterman. Waterman was an organizing member of the New Orleans chapter of the Society for the Prevention of Cruelty to Animals, as well as private secretary for Mayor Flower.

Mid-February 1899 was a time of extreme weather in New Orleans with the Great Blizzard of 1899 which produced an all-time record cold wave and with 3" of snow on the ground when normally it is between 50 °F (10 °C) and 80 °F. Another notable event in New Orleans was the Robert Charles riots. And as a new-ish citizen, the first elections he could have voted for were the elections in Louisiana of the 1900 United States elections. For Breakwell 1900 also marked a change in employment – now he worked for W. C. Craig & Co., still working in the main trade of the era of cotton, at 822 Gravier as a bookkeeper. W. C. Craig was a family connection with the Flower family of Vicksburg, Mississippi, with links to Louisiana but was mainly in North Carolina.

== Discovery of the Baháʼí Faith ==
Breakwell left the US 29 March 1901, and was living in England 2 through 28 July 1901. In very late July or very early August he visited France and encountered a Mrs. Milner on the boat voyage.

Champs-Élysées, circa Breakwell's 1901 "epiphany" there to Baháʼí Faith (1900 Edison film)

It is unknown if this Milner was a contact from New Orleans or encountered only on the boat to France – but there were two Mrs. Milners around New Orleans – the first was from Birmingham, Mississippi, with kin in town, and the second was wife of the New Orleans postmaster, though he was placed there only for one year. Regardless this Milner was acquainted with ideas in religion like theosophy and felt impelled to take Breakwell to see her acquaintance May Bolles (later Maxwell). At their first meeting in Paris, Bolles entertained Breakwell's questions on theosophy but on parting Breakwell asked if he could call on her the next day.

According to Bolles, when Breakwell returned the next day, he told her that he had experienced a profoundly spiritual moment after leaving her. Breakwell told her that while walking on the Champs-Élysées, "…suddenly a wind struck me and whirled around me, and in that wind a voice said, with an indescribable sweetness and penetration, 'Christ has come again! Christ has come again!' " When Breakwell asked Bolles if she thought him insane, she replied "No, you are just becoming sane." Over the next three days, Bolles explained the history, principles and laws of the Baháʼí Faith and gave him materials to read. Bolles arranged for Breakwell's letter of acceptance of ʻAbdu'l-Bahá as head of the religion on 8 August 1901. On hearing another Baháʼí, Herbert Hopper, an architect born in Nebraska, was going on Baháʼí pilgrimage, Breakwell decided to cancel his existing travel plans and went with Hopper, and applied for an emergency passport 9 August to travel in Europe and "Soul-East". Hopper had applied for an emergency passport 29 July.

=== Meeting with ʻAbdu'l-Bahá ===
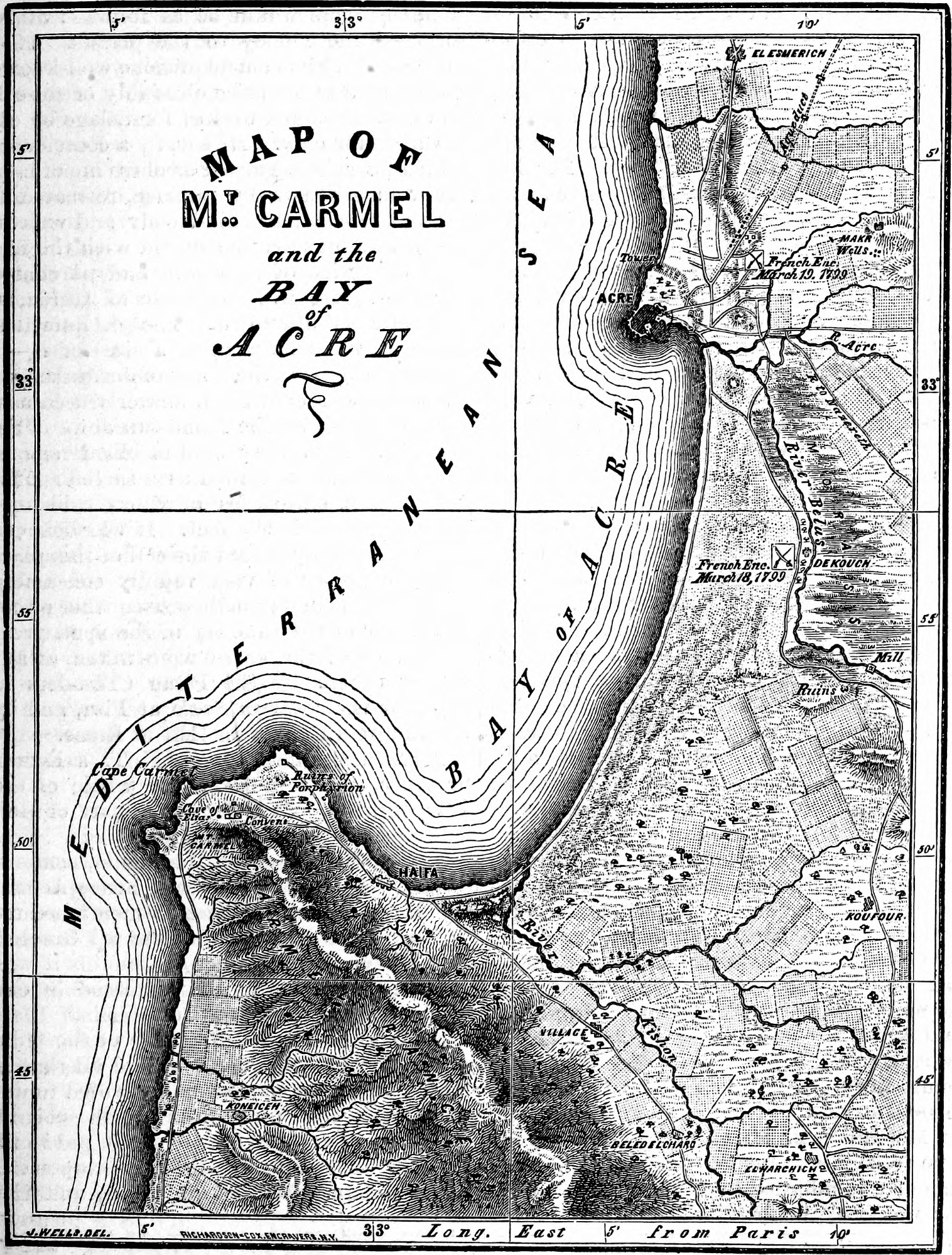
Bay of Akká

The visa Breakwell and Hopper had been able to secure only allowed them to stay in Akká for two days, two days and nights, and were joined by Isabella Brittingham. They were brought to ʻAbdu'l-Bahá's house in Akká. Breakwell was seized with doubt about the entire journey, to the point that he felt sick, until ʻAbdu'l-Bahá entered the room. He was observed by others there to be of Christian background and had accepted the religion on the basis of the Baháʼí writings and prophecies of prior religion(s). Non-authoritative pilgrim notes of their experience there emphasizes several points: warnings of prophetic troubled times meant good tidings of God's will, that a universal peace is to come, but dire events and overturning of society must be borne first, comparisons of the revelation of Jesus and of Baháʼu'lláh, and an emphasis to not use miracles as proofs of the religion or station of Baháʼu'lláh, though stories of miracles were also shared.

During his interview with ʻAbdu'l-Bahá, Breakwell explained that he benefited from the cotton industry which employed child labor and his sorrow over such work and asked ʻAbdu'l-Bahá what to do about his situation. On hearing this, ʻAbdu'l-Bahá instructed Thomas Breakwell to cable his resignation, which Breakwell did while there. Though social opposition to child labor in America dated from the 1870s regionally, nationally organized activism would begin circa 1901 with precursors of the National Child Labor Committee. Prior to leaving, ʻAbdu'l-Bahá also requested that Breakwell settle in Paris.

Breakwell wrote a letter to Bolles in Paris dated 8 September saying in part: "…But it is impossible, as you know, to express one's feelings, although it is like being bathed in a sea of spiritual water, and it covers the whole body. The atmosphere also seems, and is, different. I prayed God that he would teach me humility, and he is teaching me daily, for I never felt so deeply my imperfections and unworthiness. At times I feel as though I could throw myself at the Master's feet and cry for God's mercy, and indeed I will when I get a favorable opportunity…" ʻAbdu'l-Bahá did not escort the pilgrims to the Shrine of the Báb because of the restrictions placed on him by the local governor.

=== Life in Paris ===
Breakwell returned to Paris in September, and began to send letters, often on green sheets of paper, about every two weeks to a contact who saw ʻAbdu'l-Bahá often and who would communicate replies. Several letters ask for suffering to be borne to keep him mindful – "…I ask God for calamity; I desire undiminishing pain. I long for suffering without respite; I yearn for enduring agony and torment so that I may not for a moment neglect the mention of my Beloved." In the words of Violette Nakhjavani, "Thomas Breakwell was like a comet that blazed above the skies of Paris at the turn of the century. None could equal his ardour and sincerity; none could match the fervour of his faith. His is the story that will be forever associated with the mystery of ʻAbdu'l-Bahá's instructions to May to stay in the French capital at all costs that summer; his acceptance of the Cause was the fruit of her obedience." Bolles related that he demonstrated exemplary courtesy, intense fervor, eloquence, sympathy and genuine love, and began living a frugal lifestyle, walking instead of taking cabs and living in one of the poorer neighborhoods in Paris. Juliet Thompson received Gobineau's description of the Martyrdom of the Báb from Breakwell and she found it very confirming of her faith. During this time Breakwell's parents arrived to take him home and restore him to his family's religion; they disowned him when they failed. Less than two weeks later, however, his father also became a Baháʼí.

There is a single known picture of Breakwell. He is seated bottom center with May Bolles on his immediate left. It was originally published in Baháʼí World volume 2 in 1928, but has since been published in a few places and most of the names of the people have been identified.

=== Declining health and death ===
After many letters to ʻAbdu'l-Bahá Breakwell reported he was ill. Bolles observed signs of his being ill about six months after returning from pilgrimage and was soon under a family doctor's care though diagnosed as chronic bronchitis. Breakwell had in fact contracted tuberculosis. In his letters to ʻAbdu'l-Bahá, Breakwell demonstrates a radiant acquiescence regarding his condition, and is not only content with his suffering, but actually desires greater pain, stating, "Suffering is a heady wine; I am prepared to receive that bounty which is the greatest of all; torments of the flesh have enabled me to draw much nearer to my Lord."

Even as death approached, Breakwell was teaching the Baháʼí Faith to other patients in the tuberculosis ward where he was confined. Thomas Breakwell died at 7:00 pm on 13 June 1902, at the age of 30. He was buried in Pantin Cemetery in Paris. To Baháʼís in Akká ʻAbdu'l-Bahá said: "Did you hear? Breakwell has ascended. I was heartbroken. I have written a moving Tablet of Visitation for him. I wrote it with such emotion that I wept as I wrote. You must translate it well so that he who reads it will not be able to hold back his tears." It was written in response to the request of Breakwell's father in December 1902, and also shared through Charles Mason Remey. A small part:

O Breakwell! O my dear one! Where are thy beauteous eyes? Thy smiling lips? Thy princely cheek? Thy graceful form? O Breakwell! O my dear one! At all times do I call thee to mind, I shall never forget thee. I pray for thee by day and by night. I see thee plain before me, as if in open day. O Breakwell! O my dear one!…

Breakwell's father sent an envelope to ʻAbdu'l-Bahá who was noted saying: "What pleasant fragrance emanates from this envelope, open it quickly and see where it comes from. Hurry up." Inside was a postcard and a sealed envelope. The card had gold-colored handwriting and a violet attached reading: "He is not dead, he lives in the Abha Kingdom." And there was the added note: "This flower was picked from Breakwell's grave." ʻAbdu'l-Bahá suddenly leapt from His seat, seized the postcard, placed it on His blessed forehead and wept.

== Significance and legacy ==
The grave was leased for only five years and no surviving members of his family kept up the payments on the plot. His bones were gathered in the cemetery's charnel house. After many years the plot was vacant again and the Bahá'í National Spiritual Assembly of France applied for permission to erect a permanent monument to Breakwell on the site and it was established in 1997 though the management of the cemetery insisted the monument be "simple". The site has become a focal point of pilgrimage. The Universal House of Justice of the Baháʼí Faith, the modern head of the religion, has encouraged the French Baháʼí community to continue its efforts to retrieve Breakwell's remains from the charnel house and have them returned to their original grave.

Thomas Breakwell's stature as an early Baháʼí of note has a spiritual dimension as well as a material one. In the eulogy ʻAbdu'l-Bahá states that Breakwell had reached the highest spiritual station to which a human being can attain, and had seen the face of God. Within Baháʼí usage, in Arabic terminology, it is said Breakwell left the "world of Nasut" of human beings in the world, "a psychological world in which we must fight our spiritual battles", to that of Malakut, i.e. "the Supreme Concourse", then, confirmed, he ascended to stand before the throne of the "Lord of Jabarut" – "the world of the Mother Book and of the Preserved Tablet". Shoghi Effendi, head of the religion after ʻAbdu'l-Bahá, declared that Breakwell was one of the "three luminaries of the Irish, English and Scottish Baháʼí communities". Breakwell also became the first western Baháʼí to give the Huqúqu'lláh.

In remembrance of Thomas Breakwell, in the 1980s a nation-wide implementation of Baháʼí neighborhood schools was instituted in Great Britain and named in his honor, followed by a distance learning college. In 1998 Baháʼí musician Grant Hinden Miller released a CD with a song based on Breakwell.

== See also ==
- Baháʼí Faith in the United Kingdom
- Baháʼí Faith in France
- Baháʼí Faith in the United States
