= Ernie Rea =

Ernie Rea (born Belfast, 1945) is a British radio presenter. He is also a freelance writer and consultant on interfaith issues. He graduated from Queen's University, Belfast, with degrees in History and Politics and in Theology. He was ordained as a Presbyterian minister in 1971.

In 1978, he joined the religious broadcasting section of the BBC, and eventually rose to become Head of Religious Broadcasting. He presented Beyond Belief, a programme on BBC Radio 4 that discusses religious issues, from 2001 to 2022. He is a member of the Three Faiths Forum, an organization which exists to foster understanding between the three faiths of Christianity, Judaism and Islam.

Rea is also a trainer with The Media Training Company, along with producer Geoff Deehan.
