= John Esslemont =

British Hand of the Cause

John Esslemont

John Ebenezer Esslemont M.B., Ch.B. (1874 – 1925), from Scotland, was a prominent British adherent of the Baháʼí Faith. Shoghi Effendi, Guardian of the Baháʼí Faith, posthumously named Esslemont a Hand of the Cause of God, one of the Disciples of ʻAbdu'l-Bahá (Effendi's predecessor), and one of the United Kingdom's three luminaries of the Baháʼí Faith. He was the author of one of the foremost introductory texts on the Baháʼí Faith (Baháʼu'lláh and the New Era) and worked as a translator of Baháʼí texts near the end of his life. In addition to his work for the Baháʼí Faith, Esslemont was an accomplished physician, as well as a linguist, proficient in English, French, Spanish, German, Esperanto, and later Persian and Arabic. Dr Esslemont died of tuberculosis in Palestine in 1925.

== Background ==
=== Early life and education ===
John Ebenezer Esslemont was born in Aberdeen, Scotland on 19 May 1874, the third son and fourth child of John E. Esslemont and Margaret Davidson. The Esslemont family was distinguished and accomplished and John would prove to be no exception. He was educated at Ferryhill School and Robert Gordon's College in Aberdeen. He then went on to Aberdeen University, where he graduated with a combined degree in Medicine and Surgery with honorable distinction in 1898. In his final year, he won a medal in clinical surgery and was runner-up for the James Anderson Gold Medal and Prize in clinical medicine. As a winner of the Phillips Research Scholarship he spent the latter part of 1899 at the Universities of Berne and Strasbourg researching pharmacology. At the end of that year, he returned to Aberdeen and continued his research. At some point during his college years, Esslemont had contracted tuberculosis. This would fundamentally alter his career and his life, focusing his efforts on tuberculosis treatment, care and eradication, as well as working to preserve his own health to the extent possible. In December 1902, John married Jean Fraser, an accomplished pianist, and settled in Australia. Unfortunately, the marriage did not last long, and the couple had no children.

=== Medical career ===
Esslemont began his medical career in Aberdeen but moved to Australia in 1902. There he took a position at Ararat Hospital and became the District Surgeon and Health Officer for Alexandar County. He returned to Aberdeenshire in 1903 and, later that same year, left for South Africa in the hopes that the climate would be beneficial to his health. He worked in South Africa for five years, serving as Medical Officer of a government hospital and then as the District Surgeon at Kroonstad. He returned to Britain in 1908 and took a position as the Resident Medical Officer of the Home Sanatorium in Bournemouth, England. This was one of many facilities established for the care and treatment of tuberculosis patients, as the disease was quite common at the time. In addition to his role as a medical provider, John organized events for his patients to raise their morale, and spent long hours comforting those at the very end of their lives. Esslemont was also involved in the conceptualization of a comprehensive national health service. He helped establish the State Medical Service Association, producing recommendations which became the foundation of the British National Health Service. The combination of increasing health issues and his focus on the work of the Baháʼí Faith precluded the continuation of his medical career, and in the spring of 1923, Esslemont left Bournemouth and returned to Aberdeen..

=== Discovery of the Baháʼí Faith ===
Esslemont heard about the Baháʼí Faith in late 1914, from Katherine Parker, the wife of one of his professional associates. Having investigated many belief systems, Esslemont was interested to discover yet another in the Baháʼí Faith, borrowing a few pamphlets from Katherine Parker which intrigued him further. By March 1915 he had read several books and was beginning to adopt the patterns of Baháʼí life, becoming the first Baháʼí of Bournemouth. He helped form a Baháʼí group in Bournemouth and began to speak to various groups about the religion. He also contributed money to the Baháʼí temple fund in the United States and translated one of Baháʼu'lláh's early works, "The Hidden Words", into Esperanto.

In about 1918 ʻAbdu'l-Bahá, then head of the religion, wrote a tablet in Esslemont's honor, and also showed interest in a book he was working on. After receiving an early draft of this book ʻAbdu'l-Bahá invited Esslemont to Palestine, which he undertook in the winter of 1919–20, after the Battle of Megiddo (1918). Ultimately ʻAbdu'l-Bahá was able to personally review several chapters. News of Esslemont's declaration of faith, and his forthcoming book, played a role in establishing the beginning of the Australian Baháʼí community and elsewhere. Esslemont was elected chairman of the Bahá´í Local Spiritual Assembly of Bournemouth when it was elected in a few years and later as vice-chairman of the National Spiritual Assembly of the United Kingdom until he left the country in 1924 following the closing of the sanitorium where he had been employed. He then traveled to Palestine to assist in translation work.

Esslemont, besides speaking English well, was proficient in French, German, and Spanish, and was an Esperantist and later learned Persian and Arabic well enough to assist in translation. Following the death of ʻAbdu'l-Bahá, Shoghi Effendi vacationed in Esslemont's familiar area of Bournemouth. Subsequent to this, Esslemont took permanent residence in Palestine to assist Shoghi Effendi, who then also helped further refine Esslemont's book.

== Baháʼu'lláh and the New Era ==
In 1916 Esslemont began working on a book which was to become Baháʼu'lláh and the New Era, perhaps the foremost introductory volume on the Baháʼí Faith which was eventually published in 1923, and has since been translated into dozens of languages.

Due to the demands of his professional life, he had only completed half the book by May 1918, and when in the latter part of that year Abdu'l-Baha was made aware of Esslemont's book project, he requested a copy for his review, Esslemont forwarding the nine chapters he had completed in January 1919. His plan had been to visit Haifa in July 1919, Abdu'l-Baha requesting that he take the completed manuscript with him; however, since Esslemont hadn't completed the book he postponed his visit for a few months, arriving in Haifa in early November and staying until 23 January 1920. During this time, Abdu'l-Baha reviewed the book and spoke with Esslemont about suggestions for its improvement. As a result of having direct access to Abdu'l-Baha, Esslemont was able to collect a considerable amount of new information about the history and teachings of the Baháʼí Faith. He returned to England to revise the book, which he completed in June 1920. The work was then translated into Persian and forwarded to Abdu'l-Baha for final review. Because Abdu'l-Baha died in 1921 before reviewing the work in its entirety, the remainder was reviewed by Shoghi Effendi. The first edition of Baháʼu'lláh and the New Era was published in September 1923 and the American edition was published in October 1924. The book is still in print, though it has gone through many updates and revisions. Baháʼu'lláh and the New Era has been translated into 60 languages and is one of the most widely distributed books on the Baháʼí Faith in the world.

Esslemont also performed the first review of the worldwide progress of the Baháʼí religion in 1919. While unpublished it was identified and reviewed by recent scholars noting it was intended to be a chapter in the book. In 1920 a review of prayer in the Baháʼí Faith, especially the Long Obligatory Prayer as then translated, was published by Esslemont. Later an expanded version would be a chapter of Baháʼu'lláh and the New Era.

More than sixty years later in the 1980s it remained in the top ten of cited Baháʼí books and of the ten most numerous books on Baháʼí topics found in libraries in 2008 around the world the second highest is Baha'u'llah and the New Era.

Early editions contained several passages that could not be authenticated, or needed corrections. These have been reviewed and updated, under the authority of Baháʼí institutions, in subsequent editions. This practice has been pointed out by critics. Baháʼí institutions have written that it is an integral part of maintaining the integrity of the texts and correcting misunderstandings from the era in which it was written.

== Illness and death ==
Sometime during his early college years, John Esslemont contracted tuberculosis. As a result, he focused much of his career on the care and treatment of tuberculosis patients. He actively sought out new treatments and techniques to fight the disease, while personally moving to climates that he believed would be more hospitable to his health than his native Scotland. Although the progress of Esslemont's own case was slow, there were no medications available to cure Tuberculosis during his lifetime. After suffering bouts of illness of increasing frequency and duration over nearly three decades, Esslemont died of complications from the disease on 22 November 1925. He is buried in the Baháʼí cemetery at the foot of Mount Carmel in Haifa, Israel.

Shoghi Effendi posthumously designated Esslemont as the first of the Hands of the Cause he appointed in 1951, as well as one of the Disciples of ʻAbdu'l-Bahá. In 1955, Esslemont was described by Shoghi Effendi as one of the "three luminaries of the Irish, English and Scottish Baháʼí communities."

=== Name-giving ===
There is a Baháʼí school named after Esslemont, The John Esslemont School, in the Grampian region of North East Scotland operating since 1987.

There is also a John Esslemont Memorial Lecture held annually in November in Aberdeen, where speakers from medical backgrounds present research to peers.

In Austria a publishing house was founded in 2010 in memory of his lifework, the Esslemont Verlag, publishing Baháʼí gift books.

== Notable works ==
Assisted in the translation of the Hidden Words into Esperanto, 1916

What is a Baháʼí: pamphlet published in 1919

British edition of Baháʼu'lláh and the New Era: published in 1923

Baháʼu'lláh and His Message, pamphlet published in 1924

American edition of Baháʼu'lláh and the New Era: published in 1924

Assisted in the translation of the Tablet of Ahmad into English, 1924

Assisted in the translation of Nabil's Narrative into English, 1924

Assisted in the translation of the Hidden Words into English, 1925
