= Inder Manocha =

British actor and comedian

- Born: 1968 (age 57–58); London, England

Inder Manocha (born 1968) is a British-Indian stand-up comedian and actor.

== Early life ==
Born in London to Indian parents, Manocha read Modern History at Jesus College, Oxford University and worked in international relations and as a therapist before deciding to work professionally in comedy and acting in 2001. Manocha is a member of the Baháʼí Faith.

== Radio ==
- Freudian Slips Radio 4
- Beyond Belief Radio 5

== Television ==
- Mega Mela Malai BBC (2001)
- Life Isn't All Ha Ha Hee Hee BBC 1 (2005)
- Waking the Dead BBC1 (2005)
- Holby City BBC1 (2006)
- Skins (played Anwar's dad) E4 (2007)

== Film ==
- Filth and Wisdom
- The Blue Tower

== Print ==
- Baháʼí Art: Fact or Fiction? by Inder Manocha, Baháʼí Studies Review, Vol.3.1, 1993

== Awards ==
Winner of EMMA (Ethnic Multicultural Media Achievement Awards) Best Comedy/Comedian 2004
