= Beyond Belief (radio series) =

BBC radio programme, launched in 2002

Beyond Belief is a radio programme on the subject of religion, broadcast on BBC Radio 4. The show typically runs for 30 minutes, and features representatives of different faith traditions discussing a religious or moral issue. The programme, hosted by Ernie Rea from its inception until October 3, 2022, was first broadcast on 7 January 2002. Aleem Maqbool took over hosting duties from Rea in January 2023. The 200th edition was broadcast on 29 June 2009. On 15 July 2019, a special edition, looking at the relationship between religious faith and imagination, came from the Hay-on-Wye festival.
