= Baháʼí marriage =

Marital union in the Baháʼí Faith

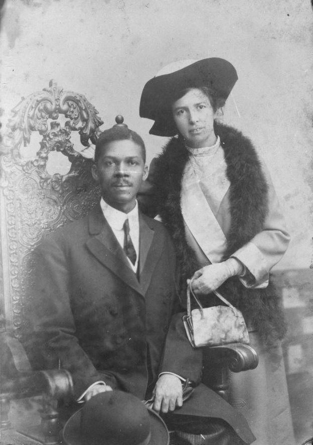
A portrait of Louis G. Gregory and Louisa Mathew Gregory, the first inter-ethnic Baha'i marriage in the United States

Baháʼí marriage is a physical and spiritual union between a man and a woman, primarily intended for spiritual purposes and to promote harmony, fellowship, and unity between the partners. The Baháʼí teachings describe marriage as "a fortress for well-being and salvation" and emphasize its role as the foundation of human society.

== Spiritual nature ==
The Baháʼí teachings on marriage describe it as an eternal bond that extends beyond physical life into the spiritual realms. As a result, the teachings emphasize that during courtship, partners should take great care to become thoroughly acquainted with each other's character. Furthermore, marriage is viewed as both a physical and spiritual union, with the expectation that spouses will support each other's spiritual growth and progress toward God.

== Engagement ==
In the Baháʼí Faith, parents cannot interfere with their children's choice of a marriage partner. However, the couple is required to obtain the consent of all living parents. This requirement aims to foster unity between the two families, as Baháʼí teachings regard marriage and family as the foundation of society. Disunity between families is seen as detrimental to this principle. The consent of all parents is required even if one of the partners is not a Baháʼí.

Some Baháʼís view this aspect of Baháʼí marriage as blending elements of marriage practices from both Eastern and Western traditions. In many Eastern cultures, arranged marriages are common, whereas in the West, marriages often proceed without parental input. The Baháʼí approach grants individuals full freedom to choose their partner while also emphasizing respect and gratitude toward their parents. According to Baháʼí teachings:

"A couple should study each other's character and spend time getting to know each other before they decide to marry, and when they do marry it should be with the intention of establishing an eternal bond."

=== Waiting period ===
The period between the official public announcement of the marriage and the wedding ceremony should not exceed 95 days. However, this 95-day engagement period is currently applicable only to Persian Baháʼís.

== Ceremony ==
The Baháʼí marriage ceremony varies across cultures, but the only mandatory element is the recitation of the wedding vows prescribed by Baháʼu'lláh. Both the bride and groom must solemnly state:

We will all, verily, abide by the Will of God.

This declaration must be made in the presence of two witnesses and recorded by a Baháʼí Local Spiritual Assembly. The legal recognition of the marriage depends on the civil laws of the respective country.

Most Baháʼí wedding ceremonies include the reading of Baháʼí writings, prayers, and music, followed by a talk on the spiritual significance of marriage. The ceremony concludes with the recitation of the vows.

== Laws ==
The Baháʼí Faith prescribes several laws regarding marriage:

- Marriage is not obligatory but is highly recommended.
- Sexual activity is permitted only within marriage.
- Both partners must be at least 15 years old at the time of engagement, though they must also comply with the civil laws of their country.
- Marriage requires the free consent of both individuals and the approval of all living parents.
- Marriage with non-Baháʼís is permitted. (See Interreligious marriage).
- The engagement period must not exceed 95 days, though this requirement is not universally applicable.
- A dowry is required for marriage. If the husband resides in a city, he must pay nineteen mithqáls (approximately 2.22 troy ounces) of pure gold, while if he lives in a village, the payment is the same amount in silver. However, it is preferable to pay the minimum amount of nineteen mithqáls of silver, regardless of location. Baháʼu'lláh also set a maximum dowry of 95 mithqáls (approximately 11.1 troy ounces), though this provision is not currently universally applicable.

== Children and parenting ==
As a natural extension of marriage, children—whether biological or adopted—should be raised in a spiritually nurturing environment. The Baháʼí Faith emphasizes the mutual responsibilities of parents and children, including education and obedience, as well as training and respect. Next to recognizing God, respect for one's parents is considered a fundamental duty. The Baháʼí teachings also place significant emphasis on reversing the degradation of women and children.
