= John Ferraby =

Prominent British Baháʼí

John Ferraby (January 9, 1914 – September 5, 1973) was a British Baháʼí born in Southsea, England, into a liberal Jewish family. He was educated at Malvern College and King's College, Cambridge, to which he won a major scholarship. He became a Baháʼí in 1941 and was elected as secretary of the National Spiritual Assembly of the Baháʼí community of the UK, which he remained until 1959.

In October 1957, Ferraby was appointed a Hand of the Cause of God by Shoghi Effendi. From 1959 to 1963, he served as one of the nine Custodians at the Baháʼí World Centre in Haifa, Israel.

After the formation of the Universal House of Justice, Ferraby settled in Cambridge and for a few years served in the secretariat for the Hands of the Cause for Europe and traveled extensively to assist European Baháʼí communities. He retired from actively serving Baháʼí due to poor health in his later years, and died in 1973.

== Works ==
- Ferraby, John (1987) [1957]. All Things Made New: A Comprehensive Outline of the Baháʼí Faith. Baháʼí Distribution Service of the UK. ISBN 978-0900125249.

All Things Made New is notable for the changes made from the original publication in 1957 to subsequent editions published after the passing of Shoghi Effendi. For example, comparing the original 1957 edition to the 1987 edition, among the numerous alterations, is the replacement of his dedication of the book to "The First Guardian of the Baháʼí Faith" to simply "The Guardian." Other references to "the Guardian" have been replaced with "the Universal House of Justice."

== Bibliography ==
- Harper, Barron (1997). Lights of Fortitude (Paperback ed.). Oxford, UK: George Ronald. ISBN 0-85398-413-1.
