= List of Baháʼís =

Baháʼís are followers of the Baháʼí Faith, a religion that teaches the essential worth of all religions and the unity of all people.

== Family of Baháʼu'lláh ==
- Ásíyih Khánum – known by her title Navváb
  - ʻAbdu'l-Bahá
  - Bahíyyih Khánum
    - Shoghi Effendi
  - Mírzá Mihdí

== Royalty ==
- Malietoa Tanumafili II (r. 1962–2007) – chieftain of the government of Samoa
- Marie of Romania (r. 1914–1927) – queen of Romania

== Artists ==
=== Bands ===
- Common Market – hip hop duo from the American Pacific Northwest
- Seals and Crofts – American soft rock duo in the early 1970s

=== Musicians ===
- Mirza Abdollah – Iranian musician
- Randy Armstrong – American musician and composer
- Cindy Blackman – American jazz and rock drummer
- Celeste Buckingham – singer/songwriter
- Doug Cameron – Canadian musician/composer
- Vic Damone – American singer and entertainer
- Khalil Fong – American-born Hong Kong singer and songwriter
- Hazel Scott- American pianist and activist
- Russell Garcia – motion picture composer
- Dizzy Gillespie – American jazz trumpeter
- Oluyemi Thomas - jazz saxophonist and clarinetist
- Andy Grammer – American singer-songwriter
- Red Grammer – American singer-songwriter best known for children's music
- Anousheh Khalili – Iranian-American singer, pianist and songwriter
- Jack Lenz – Canadian composer
- Kevin Locke – Lakota musician and dancer
- Mike Longo – American jazz pianist
- James Moody – American jazz saxophone and flute player
- KC Porter – American multi-Grammy winning producer
- Rachael Price – jazz vocalist
- Tom Price – conductor, composer and producer
- Flora Purim – Brazilian American jazz singer
- Dan Seals – American musician, of England Dan and John Ford Coley
- Tierney Sutton – American jazz singer
- Louie Shelton – American jazz guitarist and producer
- Charles Wolcott – pianist, arranger, composer for Disney and MGM films, credited with bringing rock and roll to the movies
- J. B. Eckl- songwriter, producer, recording artist
- Ryan Abeo – American singer/songwriter from Kentucky who performs under the moniker RA Scion

=== Broadcasters ===
- Susan Audé – news anchor at WIS, Columbia, South Carolina

=== Filmmakers ===
- Mark Bamford – writer, director (Cape of Good Hope)
- Sabour Bradley – Australian filmmaker
- Mary Darling – producer, Little Mosque on the Prairie
- Clark Donnelly – producer, Little Mosque on the Prairie
- Phil Lucas – Native American filmmaker
- Harold Lee Tichenor – film producer

=== Actors ===
- Penn Badgley – American movie and television actor (Gossip Girl, You)
- Justin Baldoni – American movie actor and director (Everwood, Jane the Virgin)
- Earl Cameron (Thunderball, The Interpreter)
- Omid Djalili – English comedian and actor
- Stu Gilliam – American movie actor and stand-up and TV comedian
- Barbara Hale – American Emmy Award winning actress (Perry Mason)
- Lois Hall – American movie and television actress
- Lloyd Haynes – American actor and television writer
- Jeremy Iversen – American actor and writer
- Eva LaRue – American movie and television actress (All My Children, CSI: Miami)
- Carole Lombard – American actress
- Inder Manocha – British stand-up comedian and actor
- Julie Mitchum – American actress
- Pardis Parker – Canadian comedian
- Alex Rocco – American actor (The Famous Teddy Z, The Godfather, The Wedding Planner)
- Rehana Sultan – Indian actress
- Valeska Surratt – American silent film actress
- Travis Van Winkle – American actor (The Last Ship, Hart of Dixie)
- O. Z. Whitehead – American character actor (The Grapes of Wrath, The Horse Soldiers, The Man Who Shot Liberty Valance, The Lion In Winter)
- Rainn Wilson – American movie and television actor (The Office, Six Feet Under)

=== Architects ===
- Hossein Amanat (Azadi Tower, buildings of the Baháʼí Arc, House of Worship of Samoa)
- Louis Bourgeois (House of Worship of Wilmette)
- Siamak Hariri (Baháʼí Temple of South America, House of Worship of South America)
- Fariborz Sahba (Lotus Temple, terrace gardens of Haifa)

=== Writers ===
- Burl Barer – true crime genre specializing, author of The Saint, as well as Baháʼí oriented articles
- Maya Kaathryn Bohnhoff – fantasy and science fiction author in short story and longer formats
- André Brugiroux – traveller and author
- Barry Crump – New Zealand comic author
- Margaret Danner – African-American poet
- Rod Duncan – author of the Gaslight series
- William S. Hatcher – mathematician, philosopher, educator
- Robert Hayden – Poet Laureate Consultant in Poetry to the Library of Congress from 1976 to 1978
- Louise Profeit-LeBlanc - an Aboriginal Canadian storyteller, cultural educator, artist, writer, choreographer, and film script writer from the Northern Tutchone Nation
- Guy Murchie – philosopher, scientific writer, aviator
- Bahiyyih Nakhjavani – Iranian writer
- Arvid Nelson – comic book writer, creator of Rex Mundi
- Margaret Bloodgood Peeke – traveler, lecturer, author
- Wellesley Tudor Pole – British writer
- Jeffrey Reddick – creator of the Final Destination series
- Holiday Reinhorn – writer
- Gholamreza Rouhani – poet and satirist
- William Sears – author of multiple books, an Emmy award-winning sportscaster, and host of a children's television program "In the Park."
- Farah Sprague – Qajar Iranian-born American lecturer, and writer
- Adib Taherzadeh – member of the Universal House of Justice and author of 'The Revelation of Baha'u'llah', a four-volume series on the writings of Baha'u'llah
- Sverre Holmsen – Swedish writer, environmentalist, traveller to Tahiti

=== Other artists ===
- Alice Pike Barney – portrait artist
- Laura Clifford Barney – humanitarian, philanthropist, and representative of the International Council of Women to the League of Nations
- Hussein Bikar – Egyptian painter
- Amelia Collins – philanthropist
- Sky Glabush – Painter
- Bernard Leach – potter, regarded as 'the Father of British Studio pottery'
- Anis Mojgani – spoken-word poet
- Tom Morey – musician, inventor of the bodyboard, founder and namesake for the Morey Boogie bodyboard company
- Fayard Nicholas – American dancer and one half of the Nicholas Brothers
- Rae Perlin (1910–2006) – artist
- Mishkín-Qalam – calligrapher
- Otto Rogers – Painter
- Juliet Thompson – portrait artist
- Mark Tobey – painter
- Gwen Wakeling – Academy Award-winning Hollywood costume designer

== Athletes ==
- Nelson Évora – Portuguese Olympic gold medalist (Beijing, 2008) and gold medalist at the 2007 Athletics World Championship in Osaka, Japan in Triple Jump
- Cathy Freeman – Australian Olympic gold medal-winning runner
- Matthew W. Bullock – American football player
- Khalil Greene – American professional baseball player
- David Krummenacker – Track & Field World Champion in 800m in 2003, NCAA Champion (Georgia Tech) 1997, 1998
- Pellom McDaniels – American professional gridiron football player
- Luke McPharlin – Australian footballer for the Fremantle Dockers

== Business ==
- Thornton Chase – first Baháʼí of the West, was a businessman when he joined the religion in 1894/5.
- Mildred Mottahedeh – founder of Mottahedeh & Company
- Steve Sarowitz (born 1965/1966), American billionaire, founder of Paylocity
- Zhang Xin and Pan Shiyi – famous Chinese business couple
- Zia Mody – Indian corporate lawyer and businesswoman

== Scholarly ==
=== Academics and Educators ===
- Alain LeRoy Locke – philosopher and writer, known as the 'Dean of the Harlem Renaissance'
- Roland Faber – Theologian and Philosopher, Professor of Religion and Philosophy at Claremont Graduate University.
- Thomas Kelly Cheyne - Theologian, Professor of scriptural interpretation at Oxford University
- Stanwood Cobb – Writer, as well as Founder and then president of the Association for the Advancement of Progressive Education
- Dwight W. Allen – American professor, author, education reformer, consultant and advisor to UNESCO and the World Bank Group
- Julie Oeming Badiee – American professor, Islamic art historian, educator
- Alessandro Bausani – linguist, translator and leading scholar of Iranian literature and religion
- Ali Murad Davudi (1922–1979?) – Iranian Baháʼí who was a member of the national governing body of the Baháʼís in Iran. He was a professor at Tehran University in the philosophy department. In 1979, during a wave of persecution toward Baháʼís, he was kidnapped and has been presumed a victim of state execution.
- Nava Ashraf - Professor of Economics at the London School of Economics, whose research focuses on development economics, behavioral economics, and family economics
- Donna Denizé – American poet and award-winning teacher
- Mae C. Hawes – African-American professor, settlement worker, literacy educator
- Phoebe Hearst – first woman Regent of the University of California
- Auguste-Henri Forel – Swiss myrmecologist, neuroanatomist and psychiatrist
- Jagdish Gandhi – founder of City Montessori School, Lucknow, India
- Firuz Kazemzadeh – Professor of History at Yale University, member of the National Spiritual Assembly of the United States
- Patricia Locke – Lakota Native American educator
- Pellom McDaniels – professor, researcher, inventor, author, historian, curator at Emory University and the University of Missouri at Kansas City. Founder of Arts For Smarts Foundation.
- Joseph Watson – Professor of Modern Irish at University College Dublin
- Todd Lawson – Emeritus Professor of Islamic thought at the University of Toronto and authority on the early writings of the Bab
- Professor Fariborz Moshirian - https://www.unsw.edu.au/staff/fariborz-moshirian

=== Journalists ===
- Robert Sengstacke Abbott – lawyer and newspaper publisher, one of the first self-made African American millionaires of the United States.

=== Public service ===
- David Kelly – former employee of the UK Ministry of Defence (MoD)
- Dorothy Wright Nelson – Senior Judge on the Ninth Circuit U.S. Court of Appeals; former dean, University of Southern California Gould School of Law
- Jacqueline Left Hand Bull – American Sicangu Lakota Health care policy administrator
- Layli Miller-Muro – former executive director of the Tahirih Justice Center
- Mahmud Jamal – Judge on the Supreme Court of Canada
- Payam Akhavan – prosecutor for United Nations tribunals and law professor
- Robert B. Powers – a prominent police officer in the history of California, during which he co-established one of the earliest training programs for police in matters of race relations.

=== Scholars (of Baháʼí history, Baháʼí theology, apologetics, etc.) ===
- Udo Schaefer – A German lawyer and prolific author, specialising in Baháʼí apologetics and theology, notably ethics.
- Moojan Momen – historian specializing in Baháʼí history and theology
- Peter Smith – historian and sociologist, author of a much-cited academic study of Baháʼí history, The Babi and Bahaʼi Religions: From Messianic Shiʻism to a World Religion.
- Franklin Lewis – author and translator in Iranian studies, who has also published literary analyses of the works of the Báb and Baháʼu'lláh
- Robert Stockman – historian, theologian, apologist and biographer, noted especially for works on the history of the Baháʼí community in North America
- Mírzá Abu'l-Faḍl (Persian language: ميرزا أبوالفضل), or Mírzá Abu'l-Faḍl-i-Gulpáygání (1844–1914) – foremost Baháʼí scholar who helped spread the Baháʼí Faith in Egypt, Turkmenistan, and the United States
- ʻAbdu'l-Hamíd Ishráq-Khávari (1902 – 1972) – prominent Iranian Baháʼí scholar. He became a Baháʼí in 1927. He was a teacher in one of the Baháʼí schools in Iran, until the schools were closed in 1934. He prepared many compilations of Bahá'í writings, commentaries, apologetic works, and historic studies.
- Hooshmand Dehghan – Iranian scholar and translator

=== Scientists ===
- Niky Kamran – Mathematician
- Peter J. Olver – Mathematician

== Others ==
- Leonora Armstrong – Baháʼí pioneer and international traveler
- Richard St. Barbe Baker – English environmentalist and founder of the International Tree Foundation
- Lady Blomfield – early Irish-British Baháʼí, and a supporter of the rights of children and women
- Dr Frederick D'Evelyn – first Irish-born Baháʼí
- Helen Clevenger – murdered college student
- Constance Langdon-Davies – among the early British converts to Baháʼí Faith
- Dhabihu'llah Mahrami – wrongfully accused Iranian Baháʼí, found dead in his cell in 2005
- Antony Moynihan, 3rd Baron Moynihan – British hereditary peer
- Nossrat Peseschkian – psychiatrist, psychotherapist; founder of Positive Psychotherapy
- Parivash Rohani – Iranian-American Baháʼí activist
- Hilda Yen – internationalist, diplomat, aviator
- Lidia Zamenhof – daughter of L. L. Zamenhof, inventor of Esperanto

== See also ==
- List of Apostles of Baháʼu'lláh
- List of the Hands of the Cause of God
- List of the Knights of Baháʼu'lláh
- List of former Baháʼís
- Category:Baháʼís
