= 1891 in Iran =

- Decades
- See also: Other events of 1891; Years in Iran

The following lists events that happened during 1891 in Qajar era.

== Incumbents ==
- Monarch: Naser al-Din Shah Qajar

== Births ==
- December 7 – Farah Sprague, Qajar Iranian-born American lecturer.
- ? – Ahmad Khonsari, Iranian grand ayatollah.
- ? – Ali Nasr, Iranian politician and playwright.
- ? – Freydun Atturaya, Assyrian physician and nationalist.
- ? – Mirza Rida Quli Shari'at-Sanglaji, Iranian akhoond and theologian.
- ? – Mohammad Vali Mirza Farman Farmaian, Qajar prince, Iranian politician.
- ? – Reza Hekmat, Prime Minister of Iran.
- ? – Shmuel Hayyim, Iranian journalist.
- ? – Zeynalabedin Qiyami, Chairman of the Supreme Court during the National Government of Azerbaijan..

== Deaths ==
- August 3 – Amina Aqdas, Persian royal consort.
