= High School Confidential =

The term High School Confidential may refer to:

- High School Confidential (Jerry Lee Lewis album), an album by Jerry Lee Lewis
- High School Confidential (Jerry Lee Lewis song), a song by Jerry Lee Lewis
- High School Confidential (film), a 1958 film starring Mamie Van Doren with a cameo by Jerry Lee Lewis
- High School Confidential (Rough Trade song), a song by Rough Trade
- High School Confidential (TV series), a documentary television series on the WE: Women's Entertainment network
- High School Confidential: Secrets of an Undercover Student, a book by Jeremy Iversen
- High School Confidential, the sole album by the short-lived band Tomcats
