= Philippe Jouvion =

Philippe Jouvion is a professional researcher, freelance reporter and film producer. He worked for several years with the Cité des Sciences de la Villette in Paris producing films, and a number of his documentaries have won awards. At present, he is working as a freelance journalist and is completing a television documentary on the environment.

As a journalist, he has mainly treated scientific and medical subjects, as well as tourism. He has published with Editions du Rouergue, in collaboration with Colette Gouvion.

== Works ==
- Gouvion, Colette and Philippe Jouvion. The Gardeners of God: an encounter with five million Bahai’ís (Originally published in French as Jardiniers de Dieu Oxford : Oneworld, 1993, ISBN 1-85168-052-7
- Une maison tout en récup' : Matériaux anciens, idées nouvelles, Philippe Jouvion, 2001, ISBN 2-253-08190-6
- La vie en vert, Philippe Jouvion, 1999, ISBN 2-84156-172-0
- Cadeaux gourmands, Philippe Jouvion, Dorian Shaw, Colette Gouvion, 1999, ISBN 2-84156-175-5
- Le Béret, Philippe Jouvion, 1998, ISBN 2-84156-122-4
- Ces petits riens qui changent tout, Philippe Jouvion
- Les Petits Meubles de récupération, Philippe Jouvion
- Tout pour l'enfant: vite et pas cher, ISBN 2-84156-148-8
