= Constance Langdon-Davies =

English early follower of the Baháʼí faith

- Born: Constance Rina Scott; 1898
- Died: December 1954 (aged 55–56); Oxford
- Education: Somerville College, Oxford
- Spouse: John Langdon-Davies

Constance Rina Langdon-Davies (née Scott; 1898 – 1954) was one of the early Baháʼís in Britain.

Born in 1898 as Constance Scott, she married author and journalist John Langdon-Davies in 1918. Because of this, he lost one of his scholarships which was tenable only by a single man. The resulting financial situation forced him to abandon his university career at St John's College, Oxford. In 1919, Constance started a Diploma in Anthropology at Somerville College, Oxford, where she did her History prelims.

She accepted the Baháʼí Faith in December 1936 in Torquay, Devon. By this time she was already divorced. She then served on the National Assembly for fifteen years from 1938 until her death. She associated with Mark Tobey, Bernard Leach and other artists and writers at Dartington Hall. She also translated Catalan poets into English, for example Clementina Arderiu. In the 1949, she helped set up the Local Spiritual Assembly in Oxford.

She died unexpectedly in Oxford in December 1954. She bequeathed Movement Round a Martyr by Mark Tobey to the UK National Baháʼí Community.

== See also ==
- Baháʼí Faith in England
- List of Baháʼís
