= John Langdon-Davies =

British writer

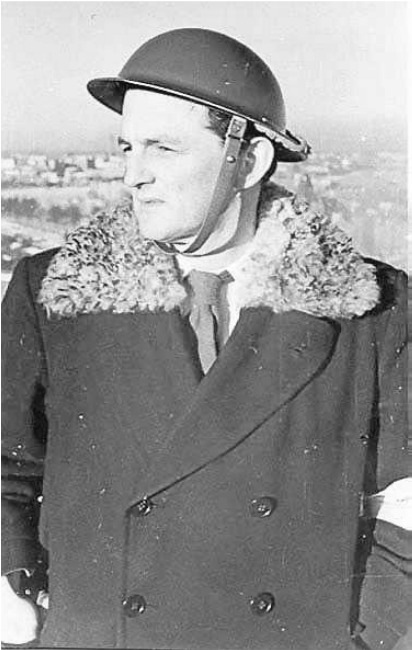
John Langdon-Davies in 1940.

John Eric Langdon-Davies MBE (18 March 1897 – 5 December 1971) was a British author and journalist. He was a war correspondent during the Spanish Civil War and the Soviet-Finnish War. As a result of his experiences in Spain, he founded the Foster Parents' Scheme for refugee children in Spain, which is now the aid organisation Plan International.

Author of books on military, scientific, historical and Spanish subjects, Langdon-Davies has been described as "an accomplished war correspondent" and "a brilliant populariser of science and technology".

== Early life ==
Langdon-Davies was born in Eshowe, Zululand (now in South Africa) in 1897. He was the son of the teacher Guy Langdon-Davies (died 1900), who described himself as "a Huxleyan, a Voltairean and a Tolstoyan pacifist." Langdon-Davies came to England at the age of six and attended Yardley Court prep school and Tonbridge School (he disliked the latter intensely). His first published work was an article entitled "The Hermit Crab", which appeared on the young people's page of The Lady in 1910.

In 1917, he published The Dream Splendid, a book of poetry inspired by the beauty of nature. According to one critic, it showed "all the young poet's faults"; to another, "Mr Langdon-Davies's verse owes nothing to the transient excitements of the hour", referring to the fact that it was not influenced by war fever. The Times Literary Supplement said it was "the outcome of a brooding imagination intensely affected by open-air influences ... and expressing itself with a real sense of style".

When called up in 1917 he declared himself a conscientious objector and refused to wear uniform. This resulted in a short term in prison before being given a medical discharge. He intended to continue his academic career at St John's College, Oxford, but one of his three scholarships was removed consequent upon his military record. Another, tenable only by a single man, was removed when he married Constance Scott, a history graduate from Somerville College, in 1918. The resulting financial situation forced him to abandon his university career, which ended with a diploma in anthropology and history.

== 1918–1936 ==
In 1919 Langdon-Davies wrote Militarism in Education, published by Headley Brothers, a study of the effect of the militarist and nationalist content of various educational systems. He stressed the importance of environment and early influences in the education of the young, compared with heredity. During this period he was moving between London, Oxford, Berkshire, Southampton, and Ireland, where he came to know leading figures in the political world.

He also made his first visit to Catalonia, after which, in 1921, he and Connie, with their two small sons, settled for more than two years in the Pyrenean village of Ripoll, where he met groups of left-wing intellectuals and Catalan nationalists. Here, reading a lot of poetry and much influenced by Arthur Waley's translations of A Hundred and Seventy Chinese Poems, he wrote a small book of verse, Man on Mountain, which was printed in Ripoll and published by Birrell and Garnett in 1922. Since the letter w is more widely used in English than in Catalan, the local printer was obliged to send to Barcelona for extra supplies. The new w, however, turned out to be marginally larger than the originals so a slight discrepancy appears on most pages, making the book a collector's item. He returned to London and spent another period travelling between England, the United States and Catalonia. The Daily News sent him to Barcelona in 1923 to report on the coup d'état by Miguel Primo de Rivera, which he evaluated as comparable to the Irish question.

In 1924 he began a series of lecture tours in the US, speaking to women's associations and universities on history, literature and his own work. He lived in New York between 1925 and 1926, during which time he wrote The New Age of Faith, a book of scientific popularisation, published by the Viking Press, N.Y. 1925, second ed. January 1926. In it, he attacked the pseudoscientists whose books were so popular in the US, particularly advocates of racial superiority, such as Madison Grant and Lothrop Stoddard, whom Langdon-Davies described as "Race Fiends". In January 1926, The New York Times reported that Langdon-Davies, noted as a member of the Labour Party, spoke out harshly against Stoddard in the wake of Stoddard's recent warm reception and the embrace of Stoddard's ideas by the Foreign Policy Association at a meeting in the Hotel Astor; speaking in a public forum, Langdon-Davies criticised Stoddard's beliefs in scientific racism and Nordicism or Nordic superiority, asserting that there was no scientific basis for racial distinction and arguing instead for the importance of environmental factors in influencing individuals. Langdon-Davies further challenged Stoddard to a public debate. Langdon-Davies's book and his passionate critiques of the scientific racism popular at the time provoked a number of counterattacks, pointing out that Langdon-Davies himself was not a professional scientist. Most of the 60 or more published reviewers of The New Age of Faith were in agreement with John Bakeless, who wrote that "rarely has popular science been written with such spicy impertinence, such gay insouciance, or with so much intelligence and such scrupulous regard for facts...".

Langdon-Davies then moved to Sant Feliu de Guíxols, on the Catalan coast, where he stayed from 1926 to 1928 and wrote Dancing Catalans, a study of the significance of the 'Catalan national dance', the sardana. Twenty years later the Catalan writer Josep Pla said that it was the best book ever published on the sardana: "With the exception of the poetry of Joan Maragall, there is nothing in our language comparable with this essay". A Short History of Women, published in New York, had also appeared in 1927. In it Langdon-Davies traced the development of the idea of Woman from the primitive taboo, the Christian fear, worship of fertility, etc., which was now to be reshaped by the new knowledge. Virginia Woolf commented on some of the author's ideas in A Room of One's Own. In 1929 he settled in Devon but three years later (1932) he moved back to the US. Langdon-Davies' Man and his Universe (1930) was a history of humanity's scientific views, covering the period from Ancient Greece to Einstein. He returned to England again in 1935 and lived at Clapham Common. During this time, Langdon-Davies developed strong left-wing views; although not a member of the Communist Party, he was sympathetic to its activities. His book A Short History of the Future argued an alliance of Britain, France and the Soviet Union was necessary as a bulwark against fascist aggression.

== Spanish Civil War ==
Langdon-Davies welcomed the establishment of the Second Spanish Republic, describing it as a "good-tempered revolution" that marked "a real break with the past" and which would deliver freedom to Catalonia. In May 1936, he went to Spain to report on the May Day celebrations in Madrid for the News Chronicle, who sent him out again in August that same year to cover the Civil War. On this second trip he travelled by motorbike with his 16-year-old son Robin, whom he left with the "Revolutionary Committee" in Puigcerdà for safe keeping. The following year he wrote Behind the Spanish Barricades, in which he recorded the exuberance of the short-lived proletarian revolution in Barcelona and also reported on the horrors of war as he visited Toledo during the siege of the Alcázar. The book was a critical success and "even received favourable mention in the House of Lords". Behind the Spanish Barricades has recently been republished by The Clapton Press, with a prologue by Paul Preston.

Langdon-Davies expressed admiration for anarchism in Spain. He described anarchists in 1938 as "superb, loveable human beings" but felt they could not arrange an effective defence against the Nationalists. On the other hand, Langdon-Davies disapproved of the activities of the Catalan party POUM, which he felt were undermining the Republican war effort, and that was reflected in his coverage. In a debate against Fenner Brockway, Langdon-Davies supported the motion "that the suppression of the POUM was vital to the anti-fascist cause in Spain". His coverage of the Barcelona May action was strongly criticised by George Orwell in Homage to Catalonia.

In 1937 with aid worker Eric Muggeridge he founded the Foster Parents Plan for Children in Spain which has become Plan International.

== Popular front ==
In Britain during 1939 there was a strong popular front movement inside both the Labour Party and the Liberal Party for the two parties to come together to support one candidate at constituency level. A general election was expected to take place later in the year. In some instances where it was difficult for Labour to support a Liberal candidate or Liberal to support a Labour candidate, the two parties would agree to support an independent progressive candidate. Even though Langdon-Davies had stood as Labour candidate for Epsom in 1923, he had not been involved with the party since. In Rye, Labour had not selected a candidate and the Liberal candidate had stepped down in February. The two parties formed a joint committee who approached Langdon-Davies who agreed to be their candidate. He was adopted as prospective candidate by this committee in July 1939 and spent the next five weeks campaigning in the constituency. After war broke out, the expected election was not called and he never contested the division.

== Later career ==
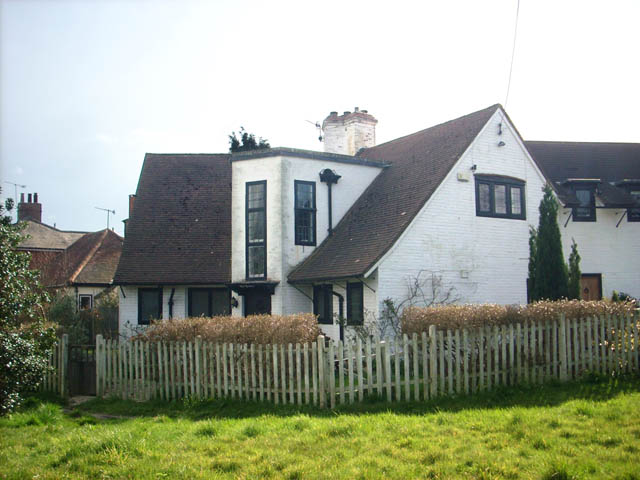
Langdon-Davies's home "The Sundial" in South Holmwood, near Dorking, was built in 1903 for Mr and Mrs Pethick Lawrence as a country home for the Espérance Club for working-class London girls. A sundial with the motto, "Let others tell of storms and showers, I tell of sunny morning hours", is on the south-east wall

Langdon-Davies was dismayed by the Molotov–Ribbentrop Pact which caused him to repudiate the Soviet Union as having become the betrayer of socialism. During World War II, he worked as a military instructor and writer of manuals for the Home Guard. Major Langdon-Davies of the Sussex Home Guard was awarded the MBE in 1943.

After the war Langdon-Davies was in the anti-Stalinist left and stated the Soviet government had "declared against the liberty of the mind of man". Langdon-Davies' Russia Puts the Clock Back was an indictment of Soviet science under Stalin's rule, particularly Lysenkoism. Gatherings from Catalonia was a travel book describing the history of the province. His biography of Charles II of Spain, Carlos: The King who would Not Die was praised by the journal Hispania, which stated, "The events of this history are recounted with a fine evocative power supported by impressive research".

In the early 1960s he created the "Jackdaw" series of history learning aids for school children, published by Jonathan Cape. The series was commended by the British Journal of Educational Studies.

== Legacy ==
Plan International, the children's charity Langdon-Davies co-founded, now works in 50 of the world's poorest countries across Africa, Asia and Latin America. In March 2014 his book The Invasion in the Snow, about the Soviet invasion of Finland in 1939, was translated into Finnish to mark the 75th anniversary. Proceeds from the book helped support Plan International.

== Bibliography ==
=== Books ===

- The Dream Splendid (1917)
- Militarism in Education (1919)
- Man on Mountain (1922)
- The New Age of Faith (1925)
- A Short History of Women (1927)
- The Future of Nakedness (1928)
- Dancing Catalans (1929)
- Man and his Universe (1930)
- Science and Common Sense (1931)
- Inside the atom (1933)
- Radio. The Story of the Capture and Use of Radio Waves (1935)
- Then a Soldier (1934)
- A Short History of the Future (1936)
- Behind the Spanish Barricades. 7 July 2022. (1936)
- The Spanish Church and Politics (1937)
- The Case for the Government (1938)
- Air Raid (1938)
- Parachutes over Britain (1940)
- Fifth Column (1940)
- Finland. The First Total War (1940)
- Nerves versus Nazis (1940)
- Invasion in the Snow (1941)
- The Home Guard Training Manual. 1942. (1940)
- Home Guard Warfare (1941)
- The Home Guard Fieldcraft Manual (1942)
- A Trifling Reminiscence from less troubled Times (1941)
- How to Stalk. A Practical Manual for Home Guards (1941)
- American Close-Up (1943)
- Life Blood (1945)
- British Achievement in the Art of Healing (1946)
- Conquer Fear (1948)
- Russia Puts the Clock Back (Introduction by Henry Hallett Dale) (1949)
- NPL: Jubilee Book of the National Physical Laboratory (1951)
- Westminster Hospital (1952)
- Gatherings from Catalonia (1953)
- Sex, Sin and Sanctity (1954)
- The Ethics of Atomic Research (1954)
- The Unknown, Is It Nearer? (With E.J. Dingwall) (1956)
- Seeds of Life (1957)
- Man, The Known and the Unknown (1960)
- The Cato Street Conspiracy (as John Stanhope) (1962)
- Carlos, the Bewitched (as John Nada) (1962) (US title: Carlos: The King who would Not Die)
- The Facts of Sex (1969)
- Spain (1971)

=== Articles ===
- "The truth about Madrid", News Chronicle (1936)
- "Workers are dining at the Ritz in Barcelona", News Chronicle (24 August 1936)
- "Struggle for Anti-Fascist Unity in Spain", Labour Monthly, (October 1937)
- "Bombs over Barcelona", The Listener nº 496 (1938)

=== "Jackdaws" ===
Titles include:

- The Battle of Trafalgar
- The Plague and Fire of London
- Magna Carta
- The Gunpowder Plot
- The Slave Trade and its Abolition
- Columbus and the Discovery of America
