= Lynden Behymer =

American music and theatrical manager

Lynden Ellsworth Behymer
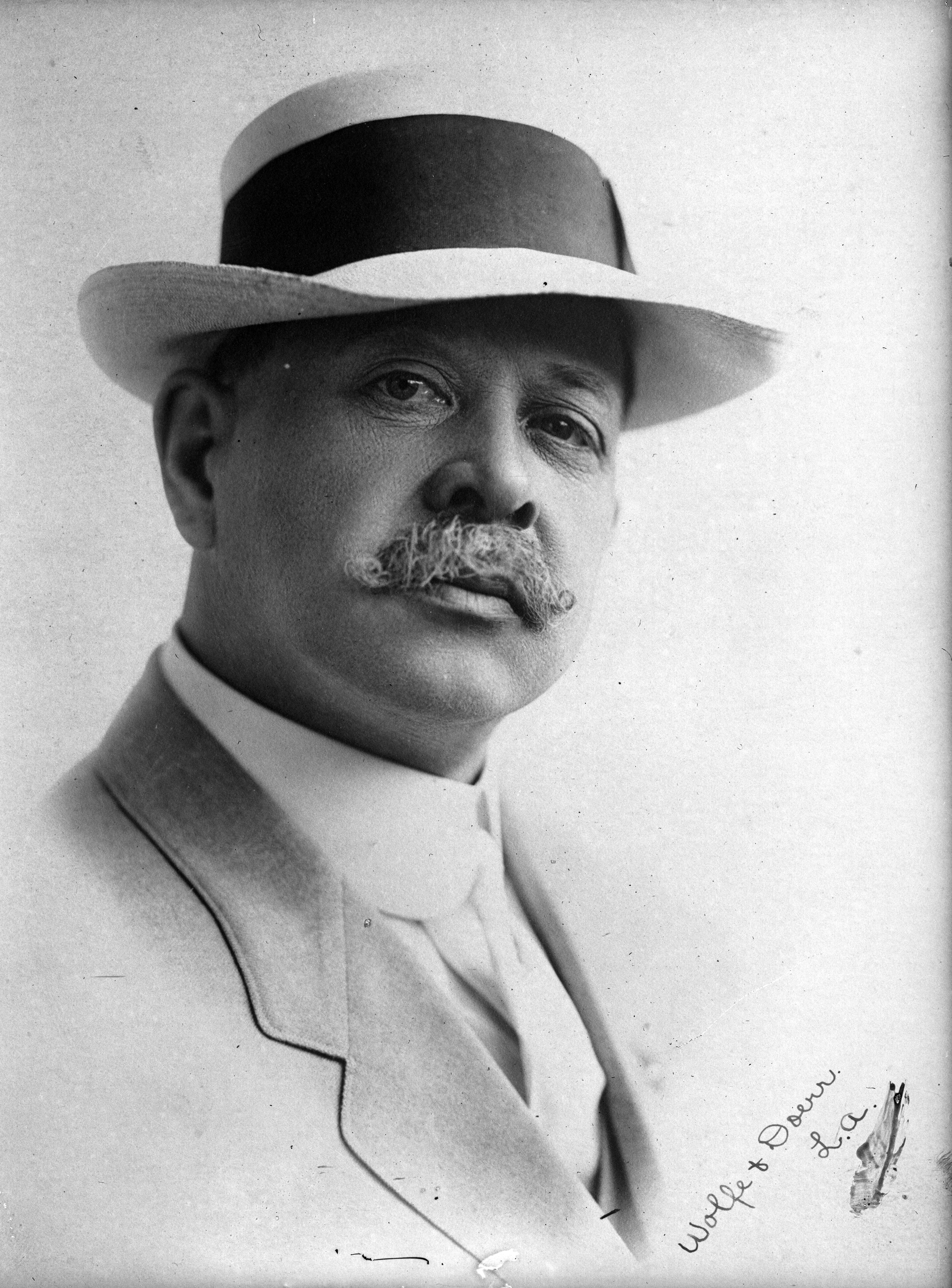
- Born: November 5, 1862; New Palestine, Ohio, U.S.
- Died: December 16, 1947 (aged 85); Los Angeles, California, U.S.
- Other names: L. E. Behymer "Bee"
- Occupations: Music and theatrical manager, impresario
- Years active: 1886–1947
- Known for: Founding the Los Angeles Philharmonic
- Awards: Order of Orange-Nassau; Order of St. Sava; Order of the Crown of Italy; Order of the White Lion; Order of the Redeemer

Lynden Ellsworth (L. E.) (Bee) Behymer (November 5, 1862 – December 16, 1947) was a music and theatrical manager in California for 60 years. In a time of theatrical and musical management typically dominated by large corporations, "Bee," as he was known, operated independently. Upon his death, Rabbi Edgar Magnin commented:, "Because of Behymer, we have a cultured city today."

== Early life ==
Behymer was born in New Palestine, Ohio during the American Civil War while his father, Aaron S. Behymer, served at the front with the Union Army in the Battle of Gettysburg. Following the war, the family moved to Shelbyville, Illinois, and young Lynden pursued an interest in books and music.

As a young adult, during the Black Hills Gold Rush era, he settled in the Dakota Territory to stake a mining claim. Here he married Minetta Sparks who was a local teacher and principal of a two-room schoolhouse. He became the proprietor of a store in Highmore, Hyde County (now South Dakota). After store and their home were destroyed in a cyclone, the couple relocated to California. He began working at the Grand Opera House in Los Angeles where he worked his way up to press agent and business manager.

== Career ==
In 1886, Behymer was instrumental in bringing Los Angeles its first important operatic production by the National Grand Opera Company. The first symphony orchestra in Los Angeles was organized by Behymer, who managed it for 18 years. He formed the Philharmonic courses in the larger cities of the American Southwest in conjunction with local music clubs and gradually built up these centers of music to rival those of the East. The Hollywood Bowl idea was formulated at the Behymer home. The first of the Easter services at Mount Rubidoux in Riverside, California, came about through a fiesta given by Behymer that was attended by Theodore Roosevelt. The annual pilgrimage to the mountain at daybreak continues today. At the pinnacle of Behymer’s career, an average season would include about 250 bookings in about 250 cities in California and the West. Behymer started his career offering a variety of entertainment programming that would appeal to all segments of the then-small population. He would mix operatic performances with the likes of Enrico Caruso, Adelina Patti and Sarah Bernhardt with other entertainment by performers like James Whitcomb Riley, Mark Twain or various vaudeville acts.

== Performers promoted ==
Many of the most famous individual artists in the musical, dramatic, scientific, historical and literary worlds have appeared in Los Angeles, California alone under Behymer’s management. Just a few of thousands of the personalities of the time presented under Mr. Behymer’s direction in the West: Sarah Bernhardt, Nellie Melba, Eleanora Duse, Tommaso Salvini, Edwin Booth, Adelina Patti, Enrico Caruso, Ignace Jan Paderewski, Mei Lan-Fang, Lily Pons, John Philip Sousa, Anna Pavlova, Isadora Duncan, Maud Allan and Mary Garden. He branched into management of lectures which included those of Mark Twain and James Whitcomb Riley.

== Honors ==
During Behymer's life he was decorated with 32 foreign honors as well as many local accolades. He held the Dutch Order of Officer of Orange-Nassau, the Serbian Order of St. Sava, the Italian Order of the Crown which made him a Cavalieri of Italy, the French Officer of the Palms, the Grecian Order of the Redeemer which came with a knighthood, the German Artistic Service, the Russian Order of St. Stanislaus, the Order of Danilo, Montenegro. On April 8, 1947, the President of Czechoslovakia presented Mr. Behymer with Czechoslovak Order of the White Lion at a luncheon in Los Angeles attended by 400.
