= Sky Glabush =

Canadian artist (born 1970)

- Born: August 26, 1970 (age 56); Alert Bay, British Columbia, Canada
- Education: University of Saskatchewan, University of Alberta
- Known for: Painter, Fabric artist

Sky Glabush (born 1970) is a Canadian artist based in Southwestern Ontario. He has created works in a number of media, but is best known as a painter. He is an associate professor of visual art at the University of Western Ontario. His work is in the collection of the National Gallery of Canada.

== Early life and education ==
Glabush was born in Alert Bay, British Columbia. He graduated with a Bachelor of Fine Arts from the University of Saskatchewan and a Masters of Fine Arts from the University of Alberta. Glabush is a Baháʼí, and the Baháʼí Faith is significant to his work.

== Career ==
In 2006 Glabush began teaching art at the University of Western Ontario. That year he held his first solo exhibition, Provisional Structures. In 2009 he exhibited Renting, a series of paintings of rental properties.

Over the next several years Glabush created and exhibited artwork in a variety of media, including sculpture, pottery, weaving and large-scale paintings. In 2016 he exhibited a series of neo-Modernist sculpture and tapestries at the Oakville Galleries, as well as holding an exhibition of woven artworks in Norway.

In 2020 Glabush travelled to Guyana, where he taught art to the inmates of prisons. That year two of his large-scale paintings were added to the collection of the National Gallery of Canada.

== Exhibitions ==
=== Solo shows ===
- All Night I Heard a Singing Bird, Philip Martin Gallery, Los Angeles, California, United States (2025)
- The Letters of this Alphabet Were Trees, Stephen Friedman Gallery, New York, United States (2024)
- The Arrangement of the Stars, Stephen Friedman Galary, London, England (2023)
- Weight of Light, Philip Martin Gallery, Los Angeles, California, United States (2021)
- The Caged Lark, Philip Martin Gallery, Los Angeles, California, United States (2021)
- The Structure of Painting, Philip Martin Gallery, Los Angeles, California, United States (2020)
- Projet Pangée, Montreal, Quebec, Canada (2018)
- The Valley of Love, Clint Roenisch Gallery, Toronto, Ontario, Canada (2018)
- A New Garden, MKG127, Toronto, Ontario, Canada (2017)
- The Window is Also a Door, Prosjektrom Normanns, Stavanger, Norway (2016)
- What is a Self? Oakville Galleries, Oakville, Ontario, Canada (2016)
- Display, MKG127, Toronto, Ontario, Canada (2014)
- The Kingdom on Names Thames Art Gallery, Chatham, Ontario, Canada (2012)
- Background, MKG127, Toronto, Ontario (2011)
- Renting, MKG127, Toronto, Ontario, Canada (2009)
- Homes for Canada, University of Manitoba, Winnipeg, Manitoba, Canada (2007)
- Provisional Structures, University of Alberta, Edmonton, Alberta, Canada (2006)

=== Group shows ===
- Flowers, Stephen Friedman Gallery, London, England (2025)
- The Sky Has a Thousand Windows, Philip Martin Gallery, Los Angeles, California, United States (2024)
- Spaces, Philip Martin Gallery, Los Angeles, California, United States (2024)
- The Place I Am, Stephen Friedman Gallery, London, England (2023)
- The Moth and The Thunderclap, Modern Art, London, England (2022)
- BodyLand, Galerie Max Hetlzer, Berlin, Germany (2022)
- Unnatural Nature, Acquavella Galleries, New York, United States (2022)
- Land of the Lotus Eaters, Louise Alexander Gallery, Sardinia, Italy (2022)
- Here Comes the Sun, Bark Berlin Gallery, Berlin, Germany (2021)
- Works from the Collection, National Gallery of Canada, Ottawa, Ontario, Canada (2021)
- Thinking with My Hands, Galerie Zink Waldkirchen, Seubersdorf, Germany (2018)
- A Home in the Country, Clint Roenisch Gallery, Toronto, Ontario, Canada (2018)
- Again, and Again, MKG127, Toronto, Ontario, Canada(2017)
- Stellar Living, Mercer Union, Toronto, Ontario, Canada (2015)
- The Painting Project, Galerie de l’UQAM, Montreal, Québec, Canada (2013)
- Go Figure, MKG127, Toronto, Ontario (2011)
- A Sudden Frost, Elissa Cristall, Vancouver, British Columbia, Canada (2010)
- Allure of the Local, Museum London, London, Ontario, Canada (2009)
- Hinterland, McIntosh Gallery, London, Ontario, Canada (2008)
- Canada Calling: Recent work by Sky Glabush and Shary Boyle, Suzanne Biederberg Gallery, Amsterdam, Netherlands (2006)
- Here and Now, Current Drawings, Art Gallery of Alberta, Edmonton, Alberta (2005)
