= Ali Nasr =

Ali Nasr (1891–1961) was an Iranian dramatist and playwright and one of the founders of theatre in Iran. He was born in Kashan. When he was a young man, he went to Tehran and started to study the French language and literature. Then he went to Europe and studied theatre. After coming back to Iran, he founded an intellectual group named “Iran comedy” in 1925. Many prominent Iranian theatrical figures were part of this group and it became a very important factor in the development of modern Iranian drama. Nasr wrote many plays, and also founded an acting school in Tehran in 1939, where many important dramatists and actors studied.

Nasr has been described as one of the "fathers" of modern Iranian theater, and its "leading personality".

Nasr became a prominent playwright during the reformist reign of Rezā Shāh. His plays expressed didactic, moralistic themes promoting modernization, including literacy, the emancipation of women and opposition to social backwardness. His best known play, and an example of the type, is "Wedding of Hosseyn Āqā", written in 1939.

== Some of his other plays ==
- Norouz and Golnaz
- Orphan
- Three bashful sisters
- The result of polygamy
- Men are like this
- Reconciliation of a husband and a wife
- Faithful wife
- Forced marriage
