= New Palestine, Ohio =

Unincorporated community in Ohio, United States

Coordinates: 39°0′30″N 84°18′18″W

New Palestine is an unincorporated community in Pierce Township, Clermont County, in the U.S. state of Ohio.

== History ==
An old variant name was Palestine. This site was laid out as Palestine in 1818. A post office called New Palestine was established in 1850, and closed in 1905.

== See also ==
- East Palestine, Ohio
- New Palestine, Indiana
