= Zeynalabedin Qiyami =

Chairman of the Supreme Court during the National Government of Azerbaijan

Chairman of Supreme Court in Azerbaijan's Government
- In office 1945–1946

Personal details
- Born: 1891 Ahar, Iran
- Died: Unknown Baku, Azerbaijan
- Party: Azerbaijani Democratic Party

Zeynalabedin Qiyami (Azerbaijani: Zeynalabidin Qiyami, Persian: زین‌العابدین قیامی; 1891 in Ahar – ? in Baku) was an Iranian Azerbaijani politician and Jurist. By Ja'far Pishevari with the formation Azerbaijan People's Government in 1945, he was the Chairman of the Supreme Court of Azerbaijan's Government in the Ja'far Pishevari Cabinet.
