= The Gardeners of God =

Study of the Baháʼí Faith

The Gardeners of God, subtitled "An Encounter with Five Million Baháʼís". Originally published in French under the title "Les Jardiniers de Dieu" by Berg International and Tacor International in 1989. The English edition was published by Oneworld Publications in 1993.

This is the account of two French journalists, Colette Gouvion and Philippe Jouvion, determined to conduct an objective and unbiased study of the Baháʼí Faith. They travelled to the Baháʼí World Centre in Haifa, Israel and interviewed Baháʼís from all over the world with strikingly different backgrounds.
