= Sascha Grabow =

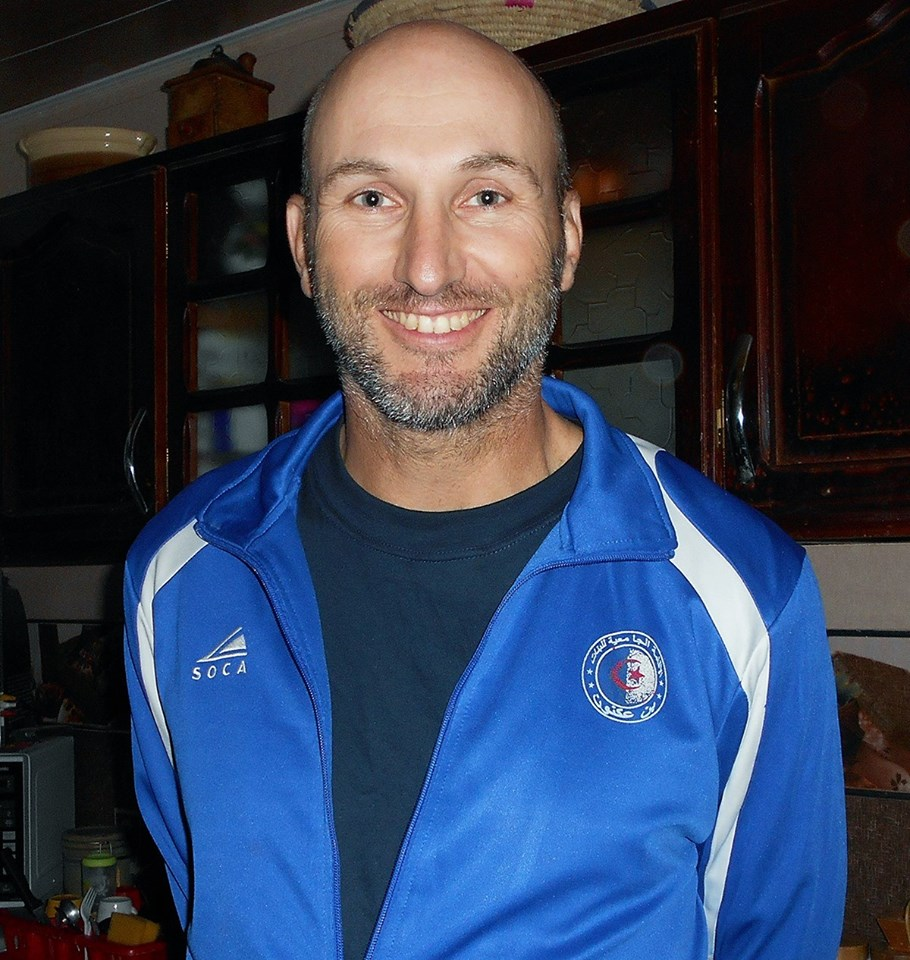
- Born: 15 January 1968 (age 58); Wolfsburg, West Germany
- Occupation: Adventurer
- Website: www.saschagrabow.com

Sascha Grabow (born 15 January 1968) is a German adventurer and mountaineer. He visited every country in the world between 1987 and 2016, and walked through both the smaller and greater Congo. Sascha Grabow in August 2021 reached world provinces' pole position as defined by both SISO and CHAD. Sascha also leads three further international travel rankings, TEC, RDW and Slowtravel. In March 2023 he became the first and for 30 months only person to visit every UN 193 Capital City. In November 2025 he won the international Nomadmania travel award "World's Biggest Traveler". According to Nomadmania, he has crossed more different land borders than any human ever has.

== Early life ==
Grabow was born in Wolfsburg, Lower Saxony. His father taught English and history while his mother was an aquarelle painter. He spent his childhood in Waiblingen, Baden-Württemberg, attended primary school in Untergruppenbach and high school at the Herzog-Christoph-Gymnasium in Beilstein.

Grabow operates a website called greatestglobetrotters.com which invites people to register their own travel histories.

== See also ==
- List of travelers
- List of explorers
- Perpetual traveler
- Global nomad
- Hitchhiker
