= Farah Sprague =

Qajar Iranian-born American lecturer (1891–1967)

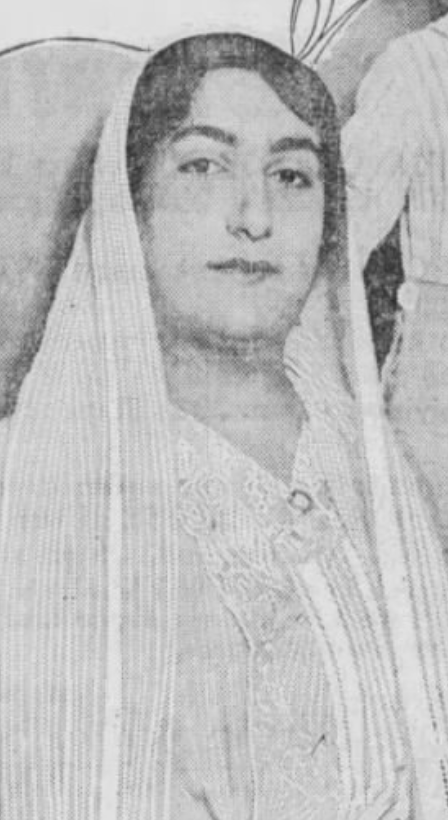
- Farahangiz Sprague, from a 1915 publication
- Born: Farahangiz Khanum; December 7, 1891; Isfahan, Qajar Iran (now Iran)
- Died: June 22, 1967 (age 75); Los Angeles, California, U.S.
- Other name: Farah Anguize Sprague
- Occupations: Lecturer, writer, hostess
- Spouse: Sydney Robinson Sprague

Farahangiz Sprague (December 7, 1891 – June 22, 1967) was a Persian-born American writer, lecturer and cultural hostess, based in Los Angeles.

== Early life ==
Sprague was from Isfahan, Qajar Iran, the daughter of Mírzá Asadu’llah Isfahani and Raziah Khanum. Her father was a poet and a philosopher, and her brother Aminu'llah Fareed was a translator for Bahá'i leader ‘Abdu’l-Bahá; both her father and brother traveled in the United States to work with American Bahá'is, and settled in the United States after they were dismissed from the Bahá'i Faith in 1914.

== Career ==
Sprague was known as a lecturer and playwright. She spoke on a panel of suffragists for peace in San Francisco in 1915. She and her husband gave a presentation on Omar Khayyam at the Ebell Club in Los Angeles in 1916. As co-producer of a play, The Hotel Imperial, in 1928, she was involved in years of legal battles with an actress, Olga Zacsek, over a salary dispute. She spoke on Persian art to the Redlands Contemporary Club in 1932, and to the Women Painters of the West in 1936, at a meeting in Barnsdall Park.

Sprague hosted a large annual Nowrooz celebration at her home. In 1942, the event featured entertainment provided by Lynden Behymer, George Wilton Ballard, and Yascha Borowsky, and a diverse guest list including Edmund Goulding, Robert Walker Kenny, Carla Laemmle, Mariska Aldrich, and Charles Wakefield Cadman. In 1952, she hosted a dinner at her home, for Iranian officials visiting California. That same year, she spoke about her childhood memories of Ramadan and Eid al-Fitr, to an audience at a rented dance hall, because there was no mosque in Los Angeles at the time.

== Publications ==
- Wedding Presents (1928, a one-act play, with Sydney R. Sprague)
- The Producer (1929, a three-act comedy, with Sydney R. Sprague)

== Personal life ==
Farahangiz married American educator Sydney Robinson Sprague in 1910, in Haifa, with her parents' approval, and with ‘Abdu’l-Bahá present for the wedding ceremony. They had a son, Howard, born in Egypt. She designed their home in Los Angeles. Her husband died in 1943, and she died in 1967, at the age of 75, in Los Angeles.
