= Parivash Rohani =

Iranian American Baha'i activist

Parivash Rohani is a Baha'i activist. She grew up in Iran but was sent to live with relatives in India when she was only nineteen, after an incident of violence against the Baha'i community in which her home was burned. While living in India, Rohani married. After six years, when seeking to renew her Iranian passport, she was told by government officials that in order to do so, she had to convert to Islam. She chose instead to let her passport lapse. She resettled in the United States in 1985, as a religious refugee, first living in California and then making a permanent home in Maine. Rohani is an advocate for a human rights campaign called “Education is not a crime”, which seeks to raise awareness of the challenges faced by the Baha'i community in Iran, including barriers to education. In addition, she also gives talks and shows documentaries on the Baha’i faith.
