= André Brugiroux =

French traveller and author (born 1937)

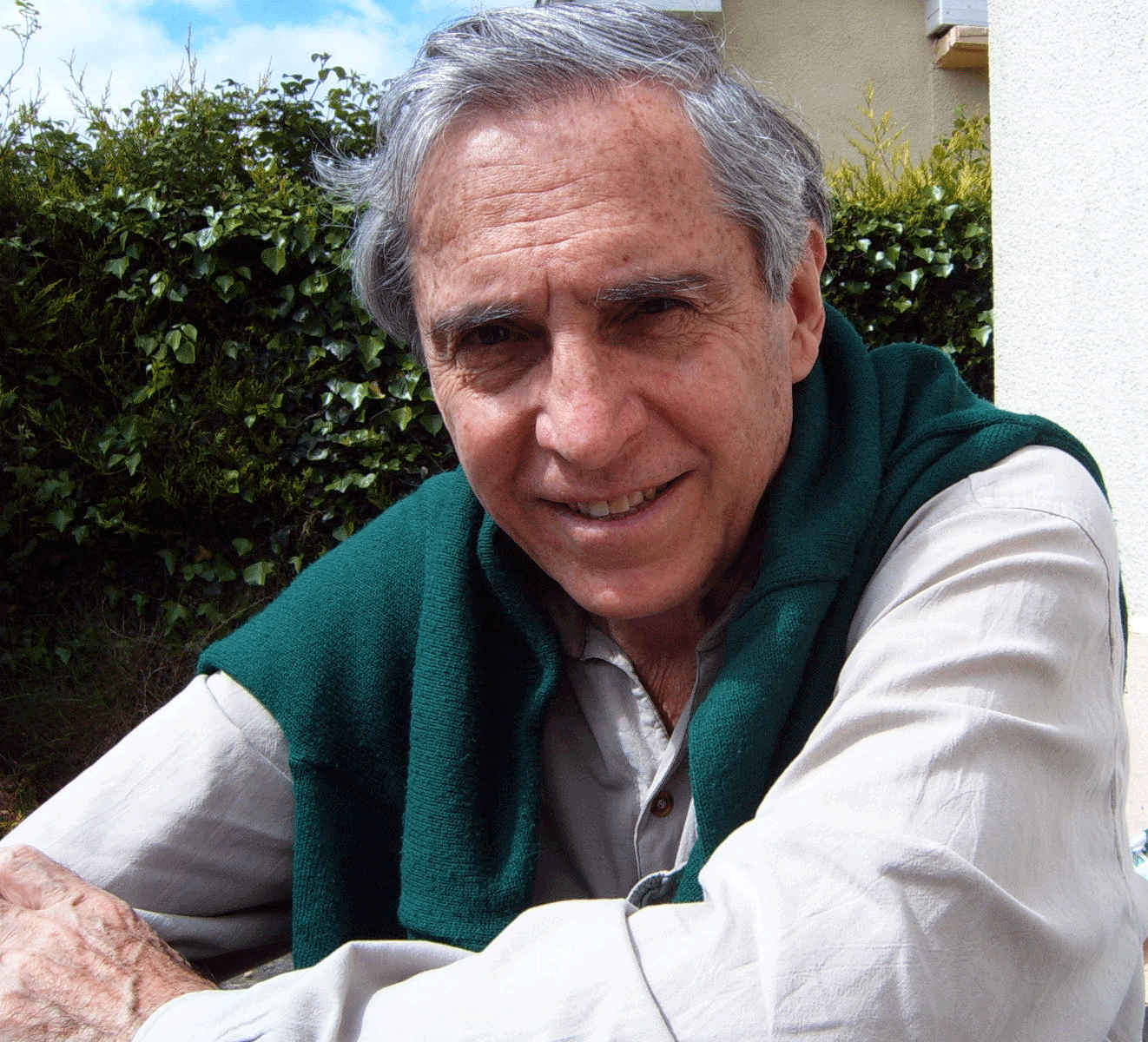
- Born: November 11, 1937; Villeneuve-Saint-Georges, France
- Occupations: Traveller, author
- Website: www.andre-brugiroux.fr

André Antoine Brugiroux (born 11 November 1937) is a French traveller and author who, between 1955 and 2005, visited every country and territory in the world, the last being Mustang. He was named "greatest living traveller on earth" in 2007 in Jorge Sánchez's list of Viajeros notables contemporaneous (Notable Contemporary Travellers). He has made a documentary film of his first, 18-year trip and has devoted his life to spreading the message of the Baháʼí Faith worldwide.

== Biography ==
Brugiroux was born in Villeneuve-Saint-Georges, Val-de-Marne, in the outskirts of Paris, to a railwayman father and an accountant mother. He spent his childhood in Brunoy, Seine-et-Oise and attended the Mardelles school in Brunoy and then the Saint-Augustin collège (secondary school) in Montgeron. Lack of work on the family farm in Langeac, Haute-Loire had led his father to move to the Paris region.

It was not his father who encouraged him to travel, however, but rather his mother, who had done some touring before getting married. She unwittingly gave him his taste for travel and provided him with the key to developing his future resourcefulness by enrolling him as a scout. The name he received as a scout was incredibly apt: "fouine babillarde" (in French), or "chattering beech marten" (a beech marten is a cunning animal and chattering means "talkative")

Growing up in wartime made such an impression on him from his early childhood that his decision to travel the world was unconsciously inspired by the desire to find out whether peace might one day be possible.

=== Travels ===
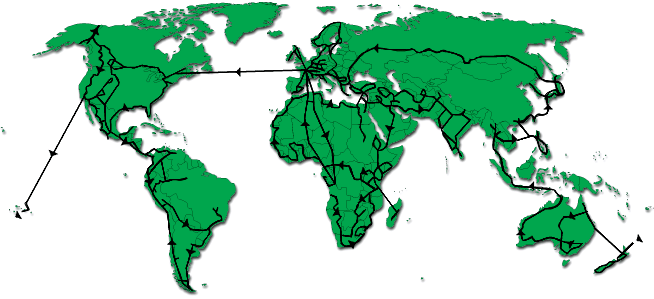
Hitchhiking around the world (400,000 km/250,000 miles) 1955-1973.

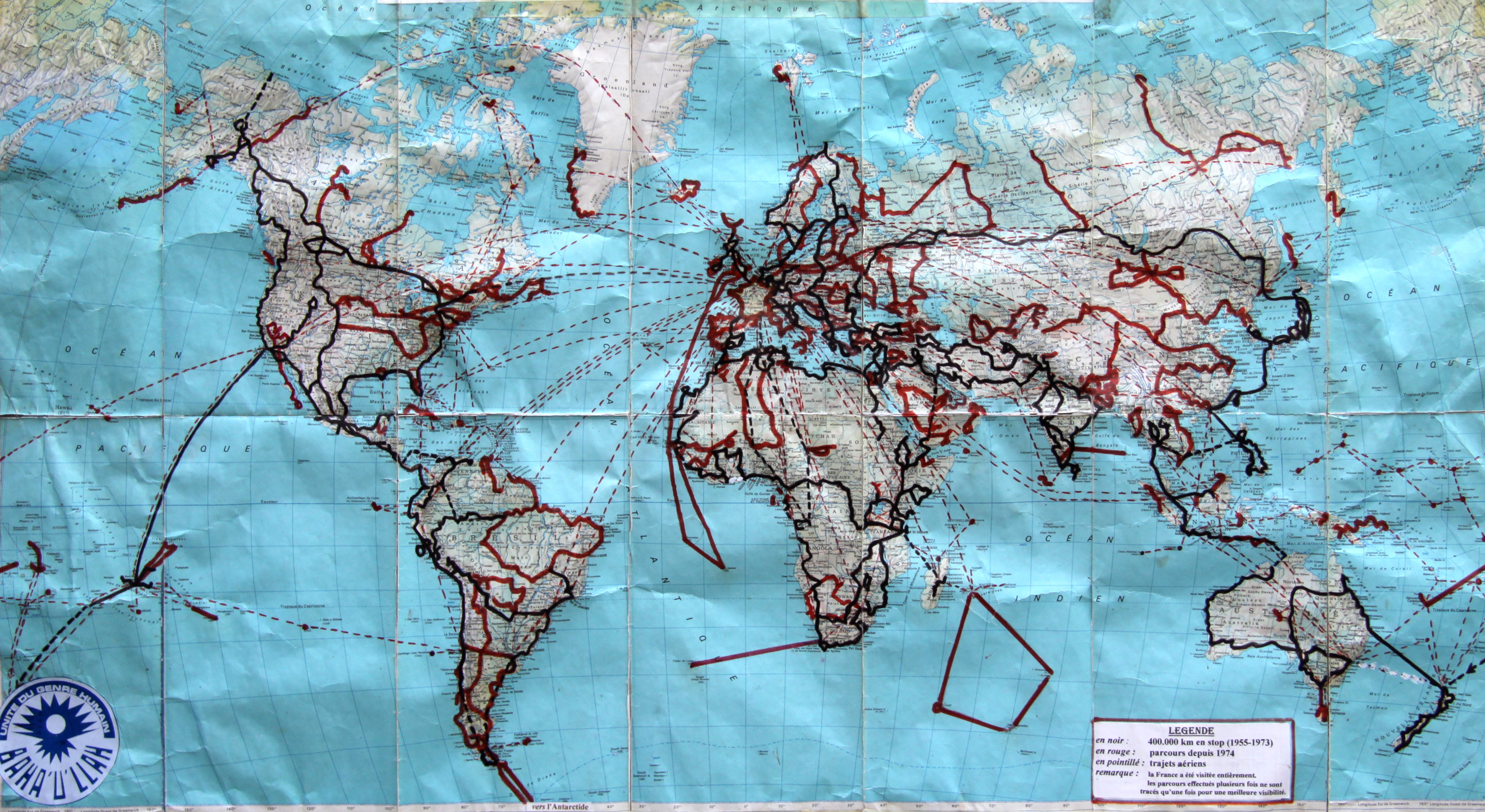
Complete journey (60 years on the road) 1955-2015.

Brugiroux left home in 1955, at the age of 17, with a diploma from the École hôtelière de Paris and ten francs in his pocket, working first for seven years in Europe to learn various foreign languages by doing part-time jobs. Between his time in Spain and West Germany he did his military service in the Congo (1958 and 1959).

Then, after working as a translator in Canada for three years (from 1965 to 1967) to save up the funds, he managed to visit the whole planet over six years without working. He travelled only by hitchhiking (including by plane, ship and yacht), spending no more than an average of one dollar a day.

During his travels he was imprisoned seven times, almost killed on several occasions, deported and robbed. He stayed with Dr. Schweitzer at his hospital in Lambaréné (Gabon) and the hippies in San Francisco, with head-hunters in Borneo and Buddhist monks in Bangkok; he studied Yoga at an ashram in India and worked on a kibbutz in Israel; he also saw, among other things, the gem-smuggling business in Ceylon (now Sri Lanka) and refugee camps in Cambodia.

In the course of his journey, he discovered and accepted an idea extolled in the nineteenth century by a Persian noble named Baháʼu'lláh: "The Earth is but one country." He returned home with a new vision of history.

After publishing his first book, producing a documentary film of his first trip and recovering his health, Brugiroux hit the road again in order not only to visit the countries he had missed the first time round and their peoples but to share the Baháʼí principles and teachings he had learnt. He travelled abroad from his base in France continuously for the next 30 years, spending six to eight months away each year and combining lectures with visiting new places. He has also travelled all over France.

In 1984 he married Rinia Van Kanten, a sociologist from Suriname whom he had met in Cayenne (French Guiana). They have a daughter named Natascha.

In 2005, Brugiroux completed his dream of seeing the whole world by watching polar bears in the bay at Churchill, Manitoba (Canada).

Since then, Brugiroux has kept travelling to know more about the world and share his convictions. In 2007, he celebrated his 70th birthday on the island of Socotra (Yemen) with other travellers. In 2008, he finally enjoyed the last forbidden kingdom: Saudi Arabia. In 2009, in Siberia, he went down the Lena River and drove along the road of bones from Yakutz to Magadan with the greatest travellers on earth.

In 2011, he visited a brand-new country: South Sudan. In 2013, he reached Tristan da Cunha, the remotest island in the world. Since then, in 2015 he entered Sascha Grabow's list GreatestGlobetrotters.com in 2nd position, and in 2016 Harry Mitsidis's Thebesttravelled22 in 6th position.

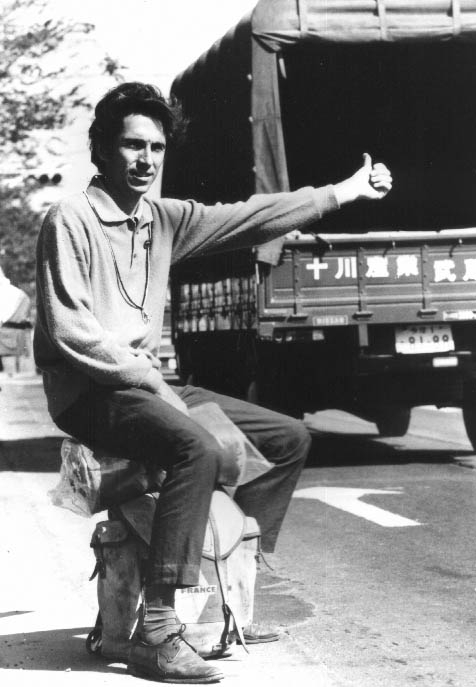
Japan, 1970

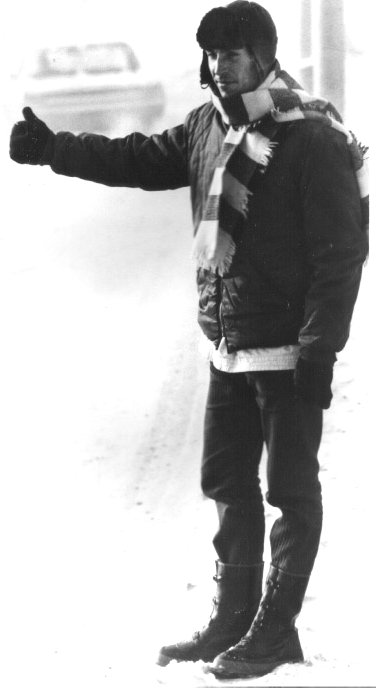
Alaska, 1969

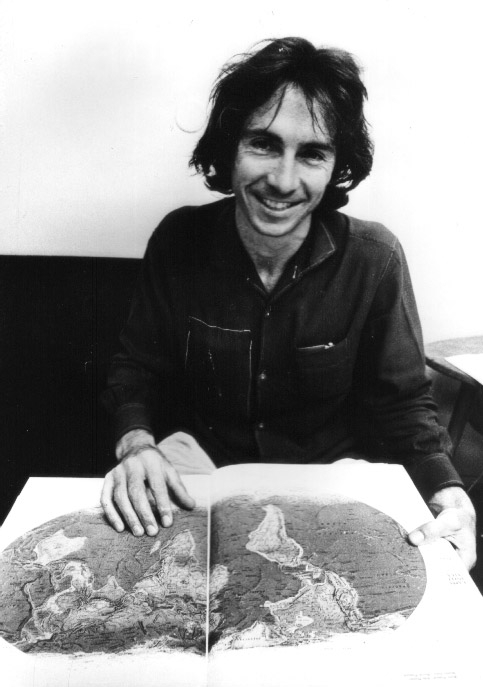
Oslo, 1973

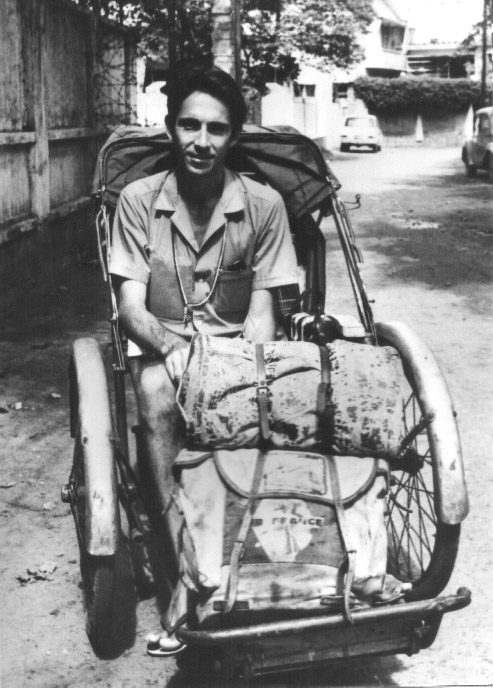
Jakarta, 1970

== Publications ==
The title of both his film and his first book, La Terre n'est qu'un seul pays (literally: "The Earth is but one country", published in English as One People, One Planet), is the conclusion to which his first journey around the world brought him, a journey which lasted 18 years before he returned home (1955 to 1973), and during which he hitchhiked 400,000 km (250,000 mi), hitchhiking through 135 countries on every continent.

== Works ==
=== Books ===
In French unless stated:

- André Brugiroux (1988). La Terre n'est qu'un seul pays (in French). Robert Laffont. ISBN 978-2-221-00265-0. (The Earth is but one country), Robert Laffont, 1975, "Vécu" collection; republished in 2007 by Géorama éditions.
  - André Brugiroux (1977). La tierra es un solo país (in Spanish). Plaza y Janés. Republished in 2016 by Alcalagrupo.es. ISBN 978-8-415009474.
  - André Brugiroux (1991). One People, One Planet: The Adventures of a World Citizen. Oneworld Publications. ISBN 978-1-85168-029-0. (English)
- André Brugiroux (1978). La Route et ses chemins. R. Laffont. (The road and its pathways).
- André Brugiroux (2006). Le prisonnier de Saint-Jean-d'Acre. Editions Etre et connaître. ISBN 978-2-911198-16-8. (The Prisoner of Acre).
- André Brugiroux (20 October 2009). Les chemins de la paix: La grande aventure des années soixante. Editions Géorama. ISBN 978-2-915002-33-1. (Pathways to Peace).
- André Brugiroux (2002). Bloc-notes d'un enseignant itinérant. LB. ISBN 978-2-912155-09-2. (Notes of a Travelling Teacher).
- André Brugiroux (2006). Une vie sur la route: chroniques d'un sac à dos. Editions Géorama. ISBN 978-2-915002-11-9. (A life on the road).
- André Brugiroux and Jérôme Bourgine (2014). L'Homme qui voulait voir tous les pays du monde. City éditions. ISBN 978-2-8246-0449-7.(The man who wanted to see all countries in the world).
- André Brugiroux and Jérôme Bourgine (2016). Le Monde est mon pays. City éditions. ISBN 978-2-8246-0769-6.(The world is my country).
- André Brugiroux (2017). Victor Hugo et l'ère nouvelle. Riveneuve éditions.(Victor Hugo and the new era).

=== Film ===
- La Terre n'est qu'un seul pays/One People, One Planet – a 400,000 km hitchhike around the globe visiting 135 countries and world civilization. This film is a documentary filmed at the time, produced and narrated by the author. Available on DVD (in French and English) since 2005.
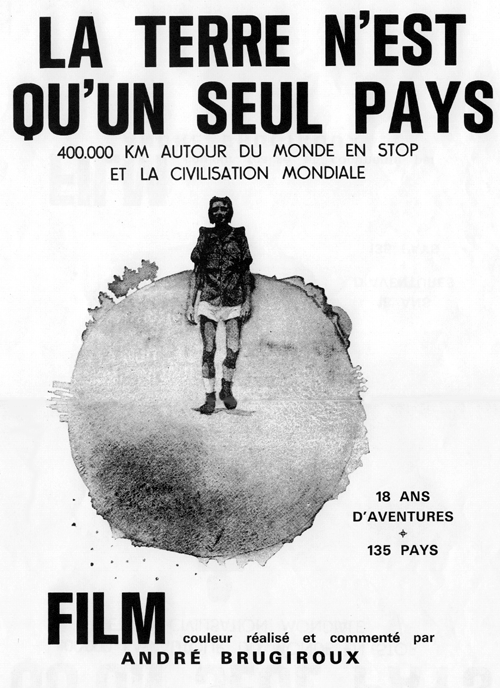
Poster for the French version of the film

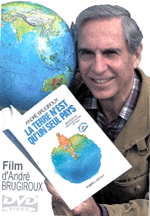
DVD of the film "One People, One Planet"

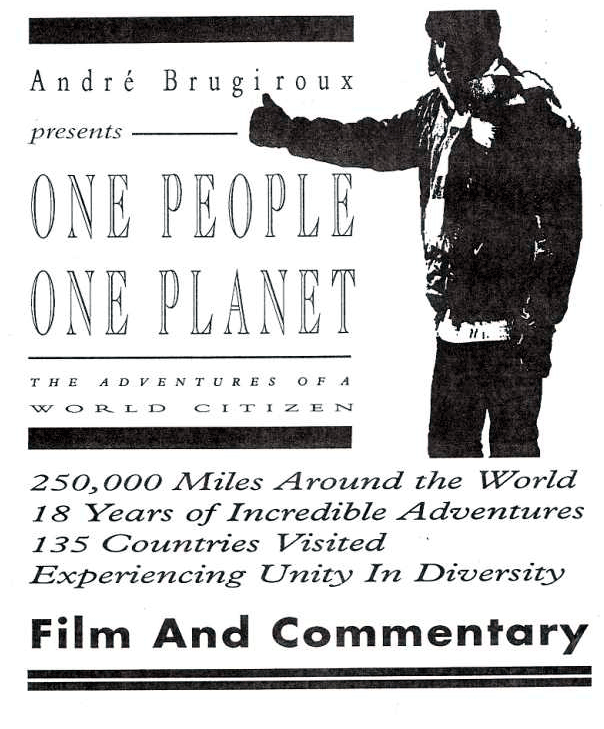
Poster for the English version of the film
