= Mae C. Hawes =

American educator (1886–1979)

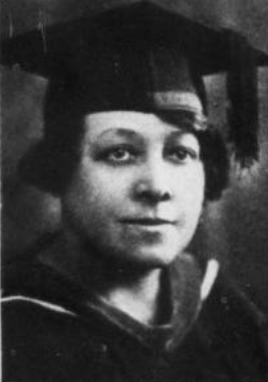
- Mae C. Hawes, from a 1926 publication
- Born: September 7, 1886; Macon, Georgia
- Died: February 1979 (aged 92); Woodbury, New York
- Occupation: Educator
- Relatives: Charles DeWitt Watts (nephew)

Mae C. Hawes (September 7, 1886 – February 1979) was an American educator and social worker, focused on adult literacy. She held positions on the faculties of several historically Black colleges, including Atlanta University, Bethune-Cookman College, Tennessee State University, and Cheyney State College.

== Early life and education ==
Hawes was born in Macon, Georgia, one of the fourteen children of Hampton B. Hawes and Janie Glover Hawes. Surgeon and activist Charles Dewitt Watts was one of her nephews.

Hawes earned a bachelor's degree at Atlanta University, and a master's degree in library science at Columbia University in 1926. While there, she lived at the International House of New York. She pursued further studies at the University of Chicago and the International People's College in Denmark. She was a member of Alpha Kappa Alpha sorority.

== Career ==
After graduate school, Hawes was the first superintendent of the Emma Ransom House, a dormitory of the Harlem YMCA. She was also active in the national YWCA, and headed the thrift department of Dunbar National Bank. She worked with Alain LeRoy Locke on literacy projects in Harlem and Atlanta during the 1930s. In 1937, she became head worker of the Southeast Settlement House in Washington, D.C.

For most of her career, she was an adult educator and college faculty member. She worked at Auburn University and taught at Bethune-Cookman College, the Atlanta University School of Social Work, and Tennessee State University. She was dean of women at Cheyney State College in Pennsylvania. In the 1950s, she was director of Stephens House at the University of Southern California.

In 1955, Hawes attended the World Assembly for Moral Re-Armament meeting in Washington. D.C. She was a member of the Women's International League for Peace and Freedom, the National Association of College Women, and the Washington Federation of Churches.

In 1968, Hawes was profiled in Ebony magazine as the "oldest VISTA volunteer", because she was still doing adult literacy work at age 81, while living at the Henry Street Settlement in New York City. "I've worked all my life and I guess I can't stop," she explained. Her congressman, Joseph Y. Resnick, was so taken with the article that he read its text into the Congressional Record.

== Personal life ==
Hawes was an adherent of the Baháʼí Faith. She died in 1979, aged 92 years, in Woodbury, New York.
