= Jeremy Iversen =

American actor

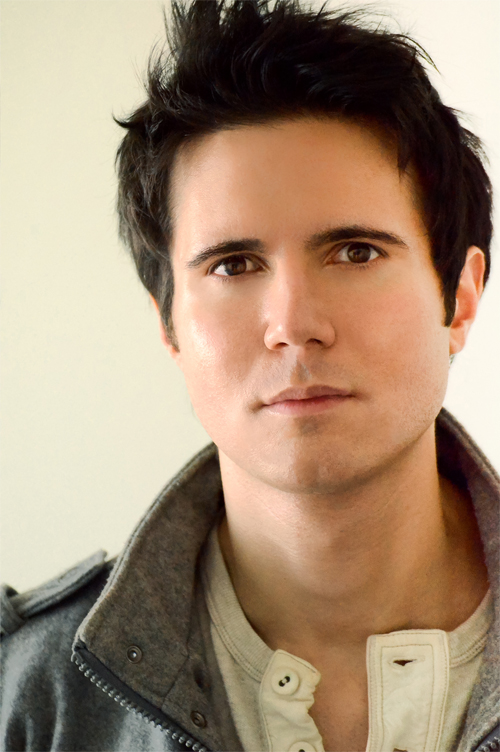
- Born: Jeremy Watt Iversen; New York City, New York, U.S.
- Occupation: Actor/Author/Speaker
- Website: jeremyiversen.com

Jeremy Watt Iversen is an American actor, author, and speaker from Manhattan, New York. He is known for his acting project of attending a California high school undercover pretending to be a teenager, about which experience he wrote the bestselling nonfiction book High School Confidential. Aside from acting and writing, he speaks to audiences ranging from corporate executives to teenage students about youth and the Millennial Generation.

== Life ==
As a child, Iversen attended the elite boarding school Phillips Exeter Academy, attaining cum laude with highest honors, and went on to gain dual degrees in international relations and political science from Stanford University, where he was graduated Phi Beta Kappa with distinction. At Stanford, he served as vice-president of the Delta Tau Delta fraternity, and was in charge of fraternity rush for the entire university.

Iversen lived in Mexico and Chile and speaks Spanish with near-native proficiency. Predominantly of Norwegian heritage, he is also a direct descendant of the British inventor and industrialist James Watt, whose steam engine ushered in the global Industrial Revolution. He worked for some time in New York as a runway model, and currently lives in Santa Monica, California.

== High School Confidential ==
At age 23, Iversen enrolled undercover at Claremont High School (Claremont, California) with the school's permission, pretending to be an ordinary high school student transferring from another school. The undertaking was partly influenced by Cameron Crowe, who had himself returned to high school undercover one generation prior, to write the book and movie of Fast Times at Ridgemont High. Iversen likewise wrote a book about his experience, titled High School Confidential: Secrets of an Undercover Student. The CBS Corporation's publishing house Simon & Schuster, one of the largest publishers in the world, released the book in hardcover, trade paperback, and eBook editions.

Iversen subsequently appeared on over seventy local and national radio shows reaching millions of listeners, as well as television programs such as Good Morning America, CNN's Showbiz Tonight, Inside Edition, and The View. He was featured in national newsmagazine U.S. News & World Report and pop-culture publication Entertainment Weekly.

=== The Sipchen Scandal ===
True to his word to the school's administrators, Iversen kept the school's identity secret, and undertook extensive measures to create composite characters of the students and teachers and blur any identifying characteristics of individuals or the school. But the site's carefully protected identity was nationally exposed by the Los Angeles Times. As Iversen appeared in media, he was identified by staff at Claremont High's newspaper, the Wolfpacket, which the L.A. Times gave an ad hoc student journalism award for its exposé, claiming it would be the first of many annual awards—although future awards never occurred. After the award had been given, the L.A. Times's Bob Sipchen, who opposed Iversen, then went on to extract quotes from precisely the five students his paper had awarded, even though none of those students had ever met Iversen, getting one ex-Wolfpacket staffer to say that Iversen was "exaggerating everything that happened and blatantly lying about his experience." The only student Sipchen interviewed who actually knew Iversen said that the book was “dead on.” Sipchen came under attack for his journalistic integrity with this technique, leading pundit Dr. Blogstein to write, “Butter up your sources with prizes and then get quotes to support your opinion. How is that legal?” Shortly thereafter, Sipchen was bought out by Times management to quit and departed to work at the Sierra Club newsletter, of which exit 39-year Times veteran Ken Reich wrote, “Not such a loss is Bob Sipchen, whose ill-informed educational column was the latest in a whole series of assignments he had filled unsuccessfully.”

=== Reception ===
Library Journal found High School Confidential "personal, emotional, and well written." John Derbyshire in National Review felt the book had few surprises and its dominant theme was the mediocrity of everyone in the school. Salon acknowledged the book's similarity to Cameron Crowe's earlier work but noted that Iversen was more serious, discussing education policy. Stephanie Zvirin at Booklist wrote that readers "will find themselves wrapped up in the lives of [Iversen's] composite kids. He catches them at their very worst and their best as they rage, dream, and struggle to move on with their lives."

Barnes & Noble selected High School Confidential as one of its ten recommended new titles, and called the book "outrageously entertaining," saying, "We give High School Confidential a resounding A+ for its irresistible smarty-pants tone and its surprising revelations about students and teachers alike." A.J. Hammer of CNN's Showbiz Tonight praised the work, and said "really nothing could compare to Jeremy Iversen's experience of posing as a student," calling the book "a fascinating read." High School Confidential made the Top 50 at Barnes & Noble—and out of over 2.5 million titles at Amazon.com, it ranked among the Top 100, where customers voted it four out of five stars.

== rush ==
rush is Iversen's coming-of-age novel about an American college student's 21st birthday celebration, in which protagonist Bret must take 21 drinks between sunset and dawn. Iversen began writing the book during his freshman year at Stanford in response to an English class assignment, and added to it over subsequent years until the story was complete. A preliminary edition of the novel was released under the title 21. Simon & Schuster published rush in trade paperback and eBook editions.

To promote the book's release, Iversen went on a nationwide tour to each of the top 21 party schools on Playboy's annual listing, holding events at every college campus with media attention. The tour also included some extra schools that weren't officially on the "party schools" list, such as Georgetown University and the University of Pennsylvania.

=== Plot ===
College junior Bret lives a hedonistic lifestyle at a fictional mediocre West Coast college called Poniente University. Fraternity tradition states that he has to take 21 drinks on his birthday night, which coincides with a raging party at his fraternity house. Bret seems to live the perfect life—wealthy, good-looking, and ultra-popular—but as the night moves forward and he gets progressively drunker, he begins to reflect on the long-forgotten decisions that got him to the top of the social pyramid. The action of the book intercuts between the wild fraternity party raging around him and flashbacks to critical moments in his younger life.

Progressively it becomes obvious that Bret was once an awkward, science-minded kid who brutally repressed everything authentic about himself in order to fit in. Now he goes through the motions of a hollow existence, unable to admit even to himself the depth of his misery. As his certainties unravel, the night does as well. A fraternity prank goes wrong and propels Bret from his comfort zone into a cross-campus adventure, where he discovers devastating truths about the house president he once idolized. Meanwhile, it becomes clear that the school and society are moving beyond the values that Bret has built his life around: while tech careers have become the hope for a dawning Information Age, his fraternity is a hated and secretly bankrupt enclave slated for demolition. With the help of a beautiful but troubled girl named Caitlin, Bret finds the strength to take a last-ditch stand in an attempt to redeem himself from years of mistakes—before it becomes too late.

rush weaves in magic realist elements, from the purportedly Atlantean medallion that Bret wears and obsessively struggles to understand, to the overarching Gnostic mythos of a hostile universe determined to keep the human spirit bound at any cost.

=== Reception ===
RT Book Reviews criticized the preliminary edition 21 for being jumbled and "tough to tell what happened when or why it matters." Publishers Weekly found the plot had some "creative turns" but was also often heavy-handed and over-the-top. In contrast, Booklist chose the book as a recommended selection, noting its "of-the-minute cultural references" and writing that "the immediate, unvarnished view will speak directly to many college-bound readers." Likewise, Sharon Morrison at School Library Journal said "readers are given realistic and. . . moving insight into one young man's spiritual soul searching. Even though the setting is a college in California, the message is universal." Joseph DeMarco of KLIATT, while noting the explicit language and sex, wrote that "the novel is humorous and provocative and though some may argue otherwise, young people should read it." Teenreads called rush "lyrical and introspective" and termed it "both a cautionary tale and one of self-discovery."

College students themselves responded favorably, with The Daily Pennsylvanian—student paper of the Ivy League University of Pennsylvania—writing that "Iversen showed that fraternity parties can inspire art." Meanwhile, Katie Haegele at The Philadelphia Inquirer wrote that "like a superfun rush event, the book pulls you in….Iversen’s book packs more punch than the detachment of American Psycho." Calling the title "compulsively readable," she added that "with its moving images of leaders and followers, teams and coaches, this book speaks intimately to the burdens that weigh on young men." Readers on Amazon have awarded the book four-and-a-half out of five stars.
