= Colette Gouvion =

French journalist and author

Colette Gouvion is a journalist and author. She worked for 13 years on the French weekly L'Express, and for 15 years was editor-in-chief of the magazine Marie Claire. She is currently the editor of Partance, a new travel magazine. She has written a number of books, including Les Enfants Problemes, La Symbolique des Rues et des Cités, La Voix des Nouveaux Paysans, Béatrice de Planissoles, Plus vous que Moi and The Gardeners of God.
