= Baháʼí Faith in Russia =

The history of the Baháʼí Faith (Вера Бахаи) in Russia began soon after the founding in 1844 of the Bábí religion, viewed by Baháʼís as the direct predecessor of the Baháʼí Faith, with Russian diplomats to Qajar Persia observing, reacting to, and sending updates about the Bábís. The woman later known as Táhirih, who played a central role in the religion of the Báb, was from an influential clerical family from Azerbaijan, which was then ruled by Russia. Russian diplomats later protected Baháʼu'lláh, the founder of the Baháʼí Faith, before and after his exile from Persia. Around 1884, the religion began to spread into the Russian Empire, where the Baháʼí community in Ashgabat built the first Baháʼí House of Worship, elected one of the first Baháʼí local administrative institutions and became a center of scholarship. The Baháʼí Faith also attracted the attention of several Russian scholars and artists. During the Soviet period, Russia adopted the Soviet policy of oppression of religion, leading the Russian Baháʼí community to abandon its administration and properties in accordance with its principle of obedience to legal government, though Baháʼís across the Soviet Union were nevertheless sent to prisons and camps or abroad. Before the dissolution of the Soviet Union Baháʼís in several cities were able to gather and organize as Perestroyka spread from Moscow through many Soviet republics. The Baháʼí National Spiritual Assembly of the Russian Federations was ultimately formed in 1995. The Association of Religion Data Archives (relying on World Christian Encyclopedia) estimated the number of Baháʼís in Russia at about 18,990 in 2005.

== Early period ==
=== Russian Empire ===
In the beginning of the earliest phase, the religion had strong connections with Azerbaijan during the Russian rule in Azerbaijan in the Russian Empire. Among the most notable facts is a woman of Azerbaijani background who would play a central role in the religion of the Báb, viewed by Bahá´ís as the direct predecessor of the Baháʼí Faith – she would be later named Tahirih, though her story would be in the context of Persia. She was among the Letters of the Living of the Báb.

In 1847, the Russian ambassador to Tehran, Prince Dimitri Ivanovich Dolgorukov, and other diplomats became aware of the claims of the Báb and seeing the fleeing of Bábís across the border requested that the Báb, then imprisoned at Maku, be moved elsewhere; he also condemned the massacres of Iranian religionists. Dolgorukov wrote some memoirs later in life but much of it has been shown to be a forgery. But his dispatches show that he was afraid of the movement spreading into the Caucasus.

In 1852, after a failed assassination attempt against the Shah of Persia for which the entire Bábí community was blamed, many Bábís, including Baháʼu'lláh, who had no role in the attempt and later severely condemned it, were arrested in a sweep. When Baháʼu'lláh was jailed by the Shah, his family went to Mírzá Majid Ahi who was married to a sister of Baháʼu'lláh, and was working as the secretary to the Russian Legation in Tehran. Baháʼu'lláh's family asked Mírzá Majid to go to Dolgorukov and ask him to intercede on behalf of Baháʼu'lláh, and Dolgorukov agreed however this assistance was short lived and again the memoirs are known to have many impossible dates in them. In addition, Baháʼu'lláh refused exile in Russia. In God Passes By, Shoghi Effendi alludes to the protection the Russian ambassador gave Baháʼu'lláh on different occasions, first after the attempted assassination of Naser al-Din Shah Qajar and again after the decision to exile Baháʼu'lláh from Iran, expressing his "desire to take Baháʼu'lláh under the protection of his government, and offered to extend every facility for His removal to Russia."

Starting in 1866, while in Adrianople, Baháʼu'lláh started writing a series of letters to world rulers, proclaiming his station as the promised one of all religions. His letters also asked them to renounce their material possessions, work together to settle disputes, and endeavour towards the betterment of the world and its peoples. Czar Alexander II of Russia was among them.

“O Czar of Russia! Incline thine ear unto the voice of God, the King, the Holy, and turn thou unto Paradise, the Spot wherein abideth He Who, among the Concourse on high, beareth the most excellent titles, and Who, in the kingdom of creation, is called by the name of God, the Effulgent, the All-Glorious. Beware that nothing deter thee from setting thy face towards thy Lord, the Compassionate, the Most Merciful.”

In his Súriy-i-Haykal, Baháʼu'lláh included the Lawh-i-Malik-i-Rús, praising Czar Alexander II of Russia in these terms: "when this Wronged One was sore-afflicted in prison, the minister of the highly esteemed government (of Russia)—may God, glorified and exalted be He, assist him!—exerted his utmost endeavor to compass My deliverance. Several times permission for My release was granted. Some of the ʻulamás of the city, however, would prevent it. Finally, My freedom was gained through the solicitude and the endeavor of His Excellency the Minister. …His Imperial Majesty, the Most Great Emperor—may God, exalted and glorified be He, assist him!—extended to Me for the sake of God his protection—a protection which has excited the envy and enmity of the foolish ones of the earth."

The text of the letter from Baháʼu'lláh to the Shah carried by Badíʻ was sent to Russian scholars by Russian diplomats and a catalog of works made its way to E.G. Browne awakening his interests. A few scholars in St. Petersburg reviewed Babí activities including the arrest and banishment of a Bábí to Smolensk.

While the Baháʼí Faith spread across the Russian Empire in the late 1800s and early 1900s, and attracted the attention of scholars and artists, the Baháʼí community in Ashgabat built the first Baháʼí House of Worship, elected one of the first Baháʼí local administrative institutions and was a center of scholarship.

Early 1900s Russian Orthodox missionaries shared warnings against the religion, asserting that it violated 'the feelings of loyalty towards the Russian White Czar' and the law of the land made it illegal for Russians to convert from Christianity to another religion.

There are several references to translations being undertaken of works into Russian in 1927 as well as correspondence with Baháʼís in Moscow and Ashgabat.

==== Eastern Europe ====
A group of Bábís formed in Nakhchivan and spread before 1850 largely of Persian expatriates who were fleeing persecution in Persia. This group was attacked by the Russian army, under the command of General Vasili Bebutov.

From 1850 on, small communities established themselves in elsewhere in Azerbaijan. Soon the community of Baku counted the largest number of believers in the region and in 1860 obtained official recognition from the authorities. The community recognized the newly announced position of Baháʼu'lláh. Soon there was more public awareness and some favor from leaders of the broader community and at the same time the Baháʼí community of Baku broadened its communication with other Baháʼí communities in Russia, Turkey and Ashkhabad and did much work printing materials in Turkish. The most publicly recognized member of the community approaching 1900 was Musa Nagiyev, one of Azerbaijan's richest citizens of the times though there were many public figures before and after who seem to have admired the religion or even been members of it.

Similarly there were developments in to the north of Russian control. In Finland, contact began between traveling Scandinavians with early Persian believers of the religion led to published accounts in 1869, and the first mentions of Baháʼu'lláh were made in 1896 while Finland was politically part of the Russian Empire. In and during the Third Partition of Poland The first may have been in the 1870s when Polish writer Walerian Jablonowski wrote several articles covering its early history in Persia. This interaction was succeeded by writer Isabella Grinevskaya who joined the religion as well as interest by Leo Tolstoy (see below.)

==== Central Asia ====
The Baháʼí Faith in Turkmenistan begins before Russian advances into the region when the area was under the influence of Persia. By 1887 a community of Baháʼí refugees from religious violence in Persia had made something of a village in Ashgabat. Several years later — by 1894 — Russia made Turkmenistan part of the Russian Empire.

Initially Russian diplomats observed the community as distinct from the Moslem one but being “closely knit community of honest, law-abiding people, somewhat reminiscent of the early Christian churches in the first century after Christ.”

During that narrow period of time between 1887 and 1894, a court case was held following the assassination of a Baháʼí that for a time would vindicate the Baháʼís. The Baháʼís were represented by Mirza Abu'l-Faḍl Gulpaygani along with Shaykh Muhammad-'Alí, each an Apostle of Baháʼu'lláh, individuals who played a vital role in the development in the early stages of the religion comparable to the apostles of Jesus. Gulpaygani lived in Ashgabat off and on from 1889 to 1894. A short time after moving there, the assassination of one of the Baháʼís there, Haji Muhammad Rida Isfahani occurred and Gulpaygani helped the Baháʼí community to respond to this event and later he was the spokesman for the Baháʼís at the trial of the assassins was initiated by Czar Alexander III through a military commission from St. Petersburg. This event established the independence of the Baháʼí Faith from Islam both for the Russian government and for the people of Ashgabat. Under the protection and freedom given by the Russian authorities, the number of Baháʼís in the community rose to 4,000 (1,000 children) by 1918 and for the first time anywhere in the world a true Baháʼí community was established, with its own hospitals, schools, workshops, newspapers, and a cemetery. This first Baháʼí House of Worship was constructed inside the city of Ashgabat. The design of the building was started in 1902, and the construction was completed in 1908 and was supervised by Vakílu'd-Dawlih, The city's general population was between 44 and 50 thousand at this time.

Within the lifetime of Baháʼu'lláh, the religion was established in Samarkand, Uzbekistan, then under Russian control. While in Samarkand in 1892 Gulpaygani wrote a book, Fassl-ul-Khitab (Conclusive Proof), in response to the questions of Mirza Haydar-Ali of Tabriz. It was in Samarkand, too, that he debated a Protestant preacher. In 1910 the Samarkand Baháʼí community elected its first assembly in addition to having a school, and built a center which held four meetings a week.

In Tashkand, a community of Baháʼís had expanded to about 1900 members, supporting a library, Persian and Russian language schools, and large meetings were being advertised with the permission of government authorities. Baháʼí literature published in Tashkand included several works of ʻAbdu'l-Bahá, the next head of the religion.

After the death of Gulpaygani, his papers, including several unfinished works, were taken to Ashqabat, where his nephew lived; many of these papers were, however, lost after the Russian Revolution of 1917.

=== Russian intellectuals ===
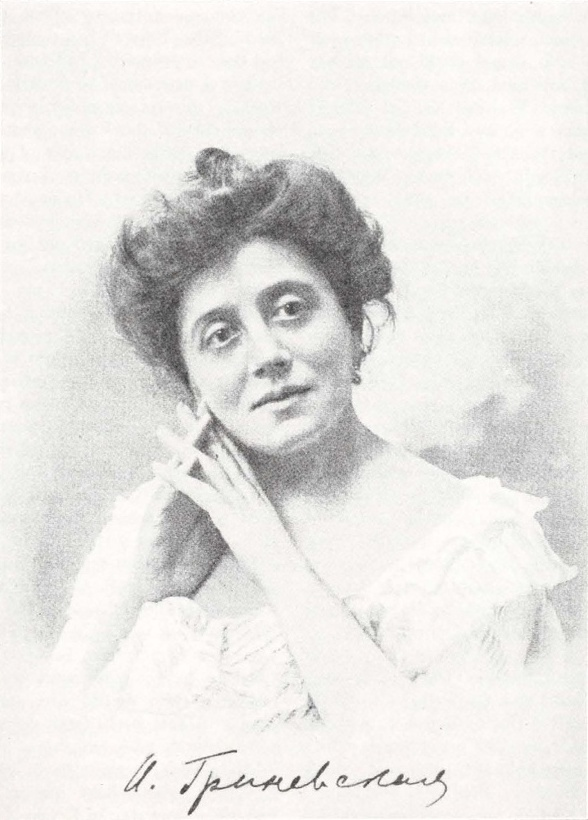
Isabella Grinevskaya.

About nine Russian intellectuals or artists investigated the religion to varying degrees. Among the more well known and closest to the religion are Alexander Tumansky, Isabella Grinevskaya, and Leo Tolstoy. Lidia Zamenhof also was active towards the end of the period and into the Soviet era. Among the lesser known but more substantive in gathering original materials and from an earlier dates from the 1860s would be Jean-Albert Bernard Dorn and Nicolai Vladimirovich Khanykov both from St. Petersburg. Together their work was collected and published in Russian by Viktor Rosen and another book beginning to include works written by Baháʼu'lláh was done by Alexander Kasimovich Kazembek.

An early translation of the Kitab-i-Aqdas into Russian was done by orientalist Alexander Tumansky published in about 1899. He befriended the Baháʼís in Ashgabat during the trial where Gulpaygani wrote a treatise for him on the Risáliy-i Iskandaríyyh as a summary of the life of the founder. Later Tumansky was a professor of Arabic language at Tiflis.

Isabella Grinevskaya was the pen name of a very early Russian Baháʼí born in Grodno. Grodno was sometimes part of Poland and Belarus but during her entire lifetime was part of Russia. She is well known because of a play she wrote called Báb which was performed in St. Petersburg in 1904 and again in 1916/7, translated into French and Tatar, and later wrote a play Baháʼu'lláh though it was never staged.

Leo Tolstoy corresponded on the Bábí and Baháʼí Faiths from 1894 until shortly before his death in 1910. His correspondents, who also sent him translations of Baháʼí writings, include Baháʼís such as Hippolyte Dreyfus, Isabella Grinevskaya, Dr. Yúnis Khán-i-Afrúkhtih, and ʻAli-Akbar Nakhjavání (father of Alí-Yulláh Nakhjavání.) In the fall of 1902 Mirza 'Azizu'llah visited Tolstoy with a personal message from ʻAbdu'l-Bahá and discussed the history and teachings of the religion during a period of house arrest that followed his excommunication from the Orthodox church. Elsewhere ʻAbdu'l-Bahá suggests that Tolstoy was a well-wisher of humanity but that he was still caught up in politics and opinion. Luigi Stendardo's thesis “Tolstoj et la Foi Baháʼíe” (later revised and published in English as "Leo Tolstoy and the Baháʼí Faith") provides an excellent analysis of Tolstoy's changing views on the religion. Tolstoy ended life feeling that he could possibly subscribe to the religion but at the same time had major reservations with regard to the Baháʼí doctrine of the Manifestation of God, which insists that God is knowable only through his Manifestations, that these Manifestations are in essence different from and above other humans and that they are infallible. In sum Tolsoy, despite his inability to accept some Baháʼí doctrines, was able to declare that “the teachings of the Bábís which come to us out of Islam have through Baháʼu'lláh's teachings been gradually developed and now present us with the highest and purest form of religious teaching”.

Lidia Zamenhof, the youngest daughter of Ludwig Zamenhof, was born in 1904 in Warsaw, then in the Russian Empire. She was an active promoter of Esperanto and around 1925 she became a member of the religion. Through her efforts and a Russian translation of "Baháʼu'lláh and the New Era" the first Ukrainian joined the religion in 1939.

=== Period of the Soviet Union ===
Since its inception the religion has had involvement in socio-economic development beginning by giving greater freedom to women, promulgating the promotion of female education as a priority concern, and that involvement was given practical expression by creating schools, agricultural coops, and clinics. The religion entered a new phase of activity when a message of the Universal House of Justice dated 20 October 1983 was released. Baháʼís were urged to seek out ways, compatible with the Baháʼí teachings, in which they could become involved in the social and economic development of the communities in which they lived. World-wide in 1979 there were 129 officially recognized Baháʼí socioeconomic development projects. By 1987, the number of officially recognized development projects had increased to 1482. However, only in the brief period before the 1930s in the Soviet Union were Baháʼís able to provide services based on their teachings. After that Soviet member states adopted the Soviet policy of oppression of religion, so the Baháʼís, strictly adhering to their principle of obedience to legal government, abandoned its administration and properties. For example, in 1924 Baháʼís in Turkistan had schools and a special committee for the advancement of women. All such developments were dissolved in the face of advances of policies on religion in the Soviet era.

In 1922 early Baháʼí Wellesley Tudor Pole began a long association with a project aimed at relieving the oppression the Bolsheviks imposed on religionists in Russia.

ʻAlí-Akbar Furútan, born 1905, moved with his family to Ashgabat in what was then Russian Turkestan and, through his years of school and university, he took an active part in the work of the Baháʼí communities of Ashgabat, Baku, Moscow, and other parts of Russia. He attended secondary school in Ashgabat and later graduated from Moscow University with a degree in psychology and child education. In 1930 he was expelled from the Soviet Union during the Stalinist persecution of religion, and, from that time on, played an ever more significant role in the work and administration of the Iranian Baháʼí community. Other tales of arrests and forced deportations are noted as early as March. Nevertheless, the head of the religion personally covered the costs of translating the Hidden Words into Russian in 1933.

Rules against the religion began in 1922 of a general nature. Then in 1926 Baháʼís in Moscow were detained, printed materials confiscated and some homes seized. Communist anti-Baháʼí pamphlets had been produced and encyclopedic articles were published in 1930 and 1933 partially reacting to the success of the religion reaching those who rejected by Islam and Communism.

Queen consort Marie of Romania had received a brooch from her royal relatives in Russia in previous decades. Circa 1926 she joined the religion and gave this brooch to Martha Root who in turn sent it as a gift to the first Baháʼí House of Worship of the West where it was sold to raise money for the contraction to a Willard Hatch. In 1931 he took it with him when he went on Baháʼí pilgrimage where with approval of Shoghi Effendi it was placed in the archives of the religion.

In 1938 "monstrous accusations" accusing Baháʼís of being 'closely linked with the leaders of Trotskyite-Bukharinist and Dashnak-Musavat bands'. Following this numerous arrests and oppression of the religion, Baháʼís across the Soviet Union were being sent to prisons and camps or sent abroad. Baháʼí communities in 38 cities across Soviet territories ceased to exist. In Tashkent Baháʼís were interrogated and imprisoned. Aqa Habibullah Baqiroff of Tashkent was sentenced to ten years imprisonment "in the neighbourhood of the North Sea and the polar forests." Many were sent to Pavlodar in northern Kazakhstan. (See Baháʼí Faith in Kazakhstan.)

By 1946 in all Turkestan only Ashgabat, Samarkand and Tashkand communities continued. Baháʼís had managed to re-enter various countries of the Eastern Bloc through the 1950s, following a plan of the head of the religion at the time, Shoghi Effendi. But by 1956 there is a vague mention of an operating community of Baháʼís in Uzbekistan. In 1955 a delegation of Russian journalists to America were forbidden to visit the North American Baháʼí House of Worship. The 1957 letter of the head of the religion challenged Baháʼís to find a way to have one Baháʼí in each Soviet Republic on the European continent: Estonia, Latvia, Lithuania, White Russia, Moldavia and Ukraine.

In 1962 in "Religion in the Soviet Union", Walter Kolarz notes:

"Islam…is attacked by the communists because it is 'reactionary', encourages nationalist narrowmindness and obstructs the education and emancipation of women. Baha'iism(sic) has incurred communist displeasure for exactly the opposite reasons. It is dangerous to Communism because of its broadmindness, its tolerance, its international outlook, the attention it pays to women's education and its insistence on equality of the sexes. All this contradicts the communist thesis about the backwardness of all religions."

A pair of small communities are listed in 1963 - Tashkand and an isolated Baháʼí in Fergana. The Universal House of Justice, the head of the religion since 1963, then recognized small Baháʼí presence across the USSR of about 200 Baháʼís.

In 1973 two aides and their wives from the Russian delegation to Panama went on a brief tour of the House of Worship built there. There are reports of sporadic arrests and interviews in Ashgabat by the KGB as late as 1982. However, in November 1987 the second Secretary in the Russian Embassy to India escorted the USSR's Ambassador-at-Large to the Baháʼí Lotus Temple and later a group of 120 performing artists from the Bolshoi Theatre of Russia visited it too. And the Baháʼí Publishing Trust of Germany was able to have a booth at the sixth International Book Fair in Moscow. Russian diplomats in India as well as ballet dancers again visited the Indian House of Worship in 1988 and 1989 this time including Orthodox Church leaders, film personalities, poets and intellectuals. Also in 1989 twenty-six Baháʼís from Finland took part in a "Peace and Environmental Festival" in Murmansk.

== Re-development ==
As Perestroyka approached, the Baháʼís began to organize and get in contact with each other.

Before the Dissolution of the Soviet Union Baháʼís in several cities were able to gather and organize. The Baháʼí community of Ashgabat was the first to re-form its Local Spiritual Assembly approximately in 1987 and had doubled its numbers from 1989 to 1991 and had successfully registered with the city government of Ashgabat. From 1988 the Baháʼís in Moscow and then in Baku became active (see also Baháʼí Faith in Ukraine.) Baháʼís in Azerbaijan sought recognition from the State Department of Religion of Azerbaijan. By the end of 1990, after 50 almost years, the election for the Spiritual Assembly of the Baháʼís of Baku was held followed by other communities before 1992.

In this brief time ʻAlí-Akbar Furútan was able to return in 1990 as the guest of honor at the election of the National Spiritual Assembly of the Baha'is of the Soviet Union. Continuing the popularity of the Indian Baháʼí House of Worship, individuals from multiple cities of Russia and former Soviet republics, as well as groups of researchers, reporters, and their families went in winter 1989 and spring 1990.

However, as the nations established themselves they began drawing up laws regulating religions to the point all the Baháʼí communities were de-established. In 1995 in Turkmenistan, 500 adult religious adherent citizens were required in each locality in order for a religious community to be registered. Thus by 1997 the Baháʼís were unregistered by the government along with several other religious communities, and more than just being unable to form administrative institutions, own properties like temples, and publish literature, perform scholarly work and community service projects -their membership in a religion is simply unrecognized, the religion is considered banned, and homes are raided for Baháʼí literature. As of 2007, under these harsh conditions, the Baháʼí community in Turkmenistan has still been unable to reach the required number of adult believers to be recognized by the government as a religion.

In 1992 the Parliament of Azerbaijan adopted the law of religious liberty and Baháʼís gained an opportunity to officially register communities and the National Spiritual Assembly of the Baháʼís of Azerbaijan was elected, effectively disbanded since 1938. In 1993 the Governing Board of the Ministry of Justice of the Azerbaijan Republic gave official permission for the functioning of the Baháʼí Community of Baku.

The Baháʼís of Baku are seeking the return of property confiscated during the Soviet era—especially a house that served as the Baháʼí Center.

In the case of Russia proper the situation was similar. From 1990 to 1997 Baháʼís had operated in some freedom, growing to 20 groups of Baháʼís registered with the federal government, but the Law on Freedom of Conscience and Religious Associations passed in 1997 is generally seen as unfriendly to minority religions though it hasn't frozen further registrations.

== Modern community ==
Because of the quick pace of the Dissolution of the Soviet Union simultaneously with the religious freedoms initially achieved, local, regional and national assemblies formed and evolved in parallel. The first Local Spiritual Assembly of Moscow was elected in 1990 followed by a summer Baháʼí school attended by some 60 Baháʼís from across the region and followed by a public concert. The National Spiritual Assembly (NSA) of the USSR was elected in 1991 which in 1992 became the NSA of Russia, Georgia & Armenia, and then in 1995 became NSA of the Russian Federation, while over the same period various Soviet republics formed their own NSAs from 1992 through 1994.

In the late summer of 1992, members of the Marion Jack Teaching Project who were working mostly within Russia at the time, came to Mongolia to participate in a concerted effort to share the religion with a wider range of Mongolians.

Ulaanbaatar was the gathering place for more than 1,800 Baháʼís from Mongolia and Russia in 2008.

After Liudmila St. Onge (Luda) was interested in the religion while in America she mentioned she was on her way to Russia. She was encouraged to seek out the Baha'is in Moscow and in Russia officially joined the religion. Luda's trip to Russia lasted much longer than anticipated, as she decided to introduce her new business of scrapbooking to Russia. This has proven very successful. She returned to New Hampshire in July 2010, and informed the local Baha'is that she had joined the religion and was eager return.

Firuz Kazemzadeh is a noted scholar on Russian history, born in Moscow, and an active Baháʼí in the United States. He has published several works on Russian history.

The Association of Religion Data Archives (relying on World Christian Encyclopedia) estimated about 18,990 Baháʼís in 2005.

=== Persian accusations associated with community in Russia ===
Both Soviet and Iranian governments produced trumped up charges against the religion as an excuse to pursue a violent oppression of the religion. In the case of the Soviets in 1938 "monstrous accusations" accusing Baháʼís of being 'closely linked with the leaders of Trotskyite-Bukharinist and Dashnak-Musavat bands'. Following this numerous arrests and oppression of the religion, Baháʼís across the Soviet Union were being sent to prisons and camps or sent abroad. Baháʼí communities in 38 cities across Soviet territories ceased to exist.

In the case of modern Iran it used the history of conflict between Iran and Russia as a circumstance to find Baháʼís blameworthy. During the 19th century Russia had been expanding south and east into Central Asia toward India where Britain held power at the time. A rivalry started between Britain and Russia over territorial and political control in Central Asia followed. The middle zone of land was where both Russia and Britain worked to gain influence. Struggles in the region lead to Persian antagonism to both foreign powers. Muslim clerics and other anti-Baháʼí groups connected the Baháʼí Faith, and its predecessor the Bábí movement, to the external governments of Britain and Russia to project the mistrust of these two latter groups onto the Baháʼís.

In addition to government and clergy-led persecution of the Baháʼís, Iranian government officials and others have claimed that Baháʼís have had ties to foreign powers, and were agents of Russian imperialism and more. These accusations against the Baháʼís have been disputed, and described as misconceptions, with no basis in historical fact. Baháʼu'lláh, the founder of the Baháʼí Faith, taught that Baháʼís are to be loyal to one's government, not be involved in politics, and to obey the laws of the country they reside in.

The foundation of much of the propaganda relating the Baháʼí Faith to Russian influence is a memoir attributed to Dimitri Ivanovich Dolgorukov who was the Russian ambassador to Persia from 1846 to 1854. The memoir states that Dolgorukov created the Bábí and Baháʼí religions so as to weaken Iran and Shiʻa Islam. The memoir was first published in 1943 in Persian in Mashhad, and shortly thereafter published again in Tehran with some of the most glaring errors corrected. The book still, however, contains so many historical errors that it is inconceivable that it is genuine.

And for all the assistance that may have come from Russian diplomats they neither intervened, nor voiced opposition, when thousands of Baháʼís were killed later even when other Europeans did. In addition, Baháʼu'lláh refused exile in Russia.

== See also ==
- History of Russia
- Religion in Russia
