= List of converts to the Baháʼí Faith =

This is a list of converts to the Baháʼí Faith organised by former religion.

== Converted from Abrahamic religions ==
=== From Islam ===
Most of the early followers of Baháʼu'lláh came from an Islamic background.

- Mírzá Abu'l-Faḍl (1844–1914) – foremost Baháʼí scholar who helped spread the Baháʼí Faith in Egypt, Turkmenistan, and the United States.
- Mishkín-Qalam (1826–1912) – prominent Baháʼí and one of the nineteen Apostles of Baháʼu'lláh, as well as a famous calligrapher of 19th-century Persia.
- Nabíl-i-Aʻzam (1831–1892) – Baháʼí historian and one of the nineteen Apostles of Baháʼu'lláh
- Hají Ákhúnd (1842–1910) – eminent follower of Baháʼu'lláh. He was appointed a Hand of the Cause, and identified as one of the nineteen Apostles of Baháʼu'lláh.
- Ibn-i-Abhar (died 1917) – appointed a Hand of the Cause, and identified as one of the nineteen Apostles of Baháʼu'lláh.
- Mírzá Mahmúd (died 1927/1928) – eminent follower of Baháʼu'lláh, the founder of the Baháʼí Faith.
- Núrayn-i-Nayyirayn – two brothers who were beheaded in the city of Isfahan in 1879.
- Somaya Ramadan (born 1951) – 2001 winner of the Naguib Mahfouz Medal for Literature.
- Hasan M. Balyuzi (1908–1980) – a descendant of relatives of the Báb, he was nevertheless a Muslim until he joined the religion following developing a friendship with Shoghi Effendi circa 1925, and eventually was named a Hand of the Cause of God.

=== From Judaism ===
- Lidia Zamenhof (1904–1942) – Polish writer, translator, active promoter of Esperanto (daughter of L. L. Zamenhof, the creator of Esperanto), killed by Germans during the Holocaust.
- John Ferraby (1914–1973) – British, Baháʼí Hand of the Cause
- Flora Purim (born 1942) – Brazilian jazz singer
- Ethel Jenner Rosenberg (1858–1930) – painter, the first English Baháʼí, secretary and publisher of Baháʼí books.
- Steve Sarowitz (born 1965/1966) – American billionaire businessman, the founder of Paylocity.

=== From Christianity ===
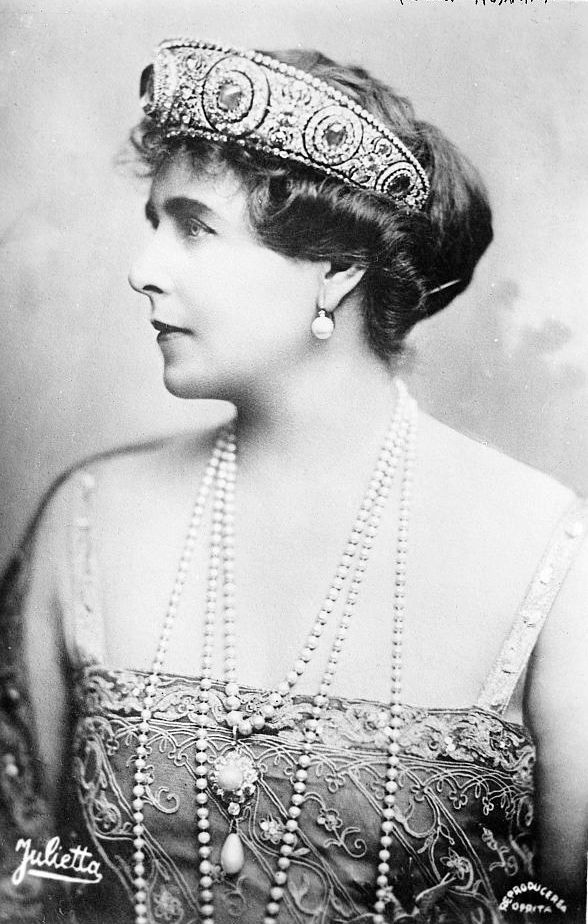
Marie of Romania converted to the Baháʼí Faith, from the Romanian Orthodox Church and previously the Church of England.

- Russell Garcia (1916–2011) – motion picture composer
- David Krummenacker (born 1975) – Track & Field indoor World Champion in 800m in 2003, NCAA Champion (Georgia Tech) 1997, 1998
- Jacqueline Left Hand Bull (born 1943) – American Indian Health care policy administrator (from Catholicism)
- Queen Marie of Romania (1875–1938) – final Queen of Romania as the wife of Ferdinand I of Romania.
- Jesse O. McCarthy (1867–1937) Toronto municipal politician and social reformer. Previously a Methodist.
- Luke McPharlin (born 1981) – Australian footballer for the Fremantle Dockers
- Julia Lynch Olin (1882–1961) – American author and Baháʼí who co-founded the New History Society in New York City.
- Enoch Olinga (1926–1979) – born to an Anglican earned the title Hand of the Cause of God.
- Mason Remey (1874–1974) – prominent American Baháʼí.

== Converted from unknown religions ==
- Arvid Nelson – American comic book writer, best known for Rex Mundi
- Zhang Xin (born 1965) – Chinese businesswoman.
- David Kelly (1944–2003) – former employee of the British Ministry of Defence and a United Nations weapons inspector in Iraq who was an authority on biological warfare.

== See also ==
- List of Baháʼís
- List of excommunicated Baháʼís
