= Shaykh Muhammad-ʻAlí =

Shaykh Muhammad Alíy-i-Qá'iní (born in Birjand in 1277 AH (1860–1861 AD); died 1924 AD (1341 AH?)) was a speaker, known to know about the art of music. He was the nephew of Nabíl-i-Akbar (Mullá Muhammad-i-Qá'iní), another apostle of Baháʼu'lláh. Under the guardianship of his paternal uncle Mulla Aqa Ali, he engaged in religious studies in Mashhad. He encountered the Baháʼí Faith and soon became an ardent believer. He became a close companion of his uncle, Nabíl-i-Akbar, until the latter died in 1892. In 1903, Shaykh Muhammad Alí was instructed to accompany Mírzá Hasan-i-Adíb to India, but on the way to India, he was caught up in the persecution against the Baháʼís in the city of Isfahán. He was stripped of his clothes, severely beaten, and fortunate to escape with his life. He had to return to Tihrán, but later reached India and stayed there for a year and a half. He then traveled to Haifa. There, ʻAbdu'l-Bahá sent him to Ishqábád to take care of the education of children. In Ishqábád, he was well-revered in the Baha'i community. Under the guidance of ʿAbdu'l-Bahāʾ, the leader of the Baha'i community, he traveled extensively across Persia, India, Russia, and Egypt to promote the faith. Apart from journeys he made for the service of the faith, he stayed in Ishqabad for the rest of his life. After the death of Mírzá Abu'l-Faḍl, Shaykh Muhammad Alí was called to Haifa to complete, with the help of others, the unfinished writings of Mírzá Abu'l-Faḍl, leaving for Ishqábád shortly before ʻAbdu'l-Bahá died.

During his career, Shaykh Muhammad Alíy-i-Qá'iní contributed significantly to Baha'i scholarship and education. In 1905, ʿAbd-al Bahāʾ instructed him to teach Bahai children and youth in Ashkabad. His intellectual skills, oratory talent, and artistic abilities in calligraphy and music were well-recognized. Shoghi Effendi, the leader of the Bahai community, listed him among the nineteen "Apostles of Baha'u'llah". His primary work, Dorus al-diāna, became a standard textbook in Bahai schools across various regions, including Persia, Egypt, and South America. He also authored letters, treatises, and participated in significant Bahai dialogues, leaving behind published and unpublished works that contributed to the community’s educational and cultural growth.

Shaykh Muhammad Alí died in 1924 after a prolonged illness.
