= Political objections to the Baháʼí Faith =

Opponents of the Baháʼí Faith have accused the faith's followers of committing various acts of political mischief, such as having a supposed "dual loyalty" and being secretly in the employ of foreign powers supposedly inimical to the interest of their home state. These accusations, together with others with a more theological bent, have been used to justify persecution of adherents of the Baháʼí Faith and the religion itself.

In support of government and clergy-led persecution of the Baháʼís, Iranian government officials and others have claimed that Baháʼís have had secret ties to foreign powers such as the Russians, British, Americans and Israelis, as well as being responsible for Zionism and the policies of the last Shah of Iran, Mohammad Reza Pahlavi.

These accusations against the Baháʼí have been disputed, and described by historians as being based on misconceived, and exaggerated interpretations of the historical records. Baháʼu'lláh, the founder of the Baháʼí Faith, preached that Baháʼís are to be loyal to one's government, not be involved in politics, and to obey the laws of the country in which they reside.

== Historical context ==
The Baháʼí Faith and its predecessor, the Bábí religion, originated in the nineteenth-century Persian Empire, arousing considerable opposition, initially on purely theological and doctrinal grounds; it was perceived by many Iranians as threat to established power and authority in Persia.

In 1852, two years after the execution of the Báb, a fringe element in the Bábí community made an unsuccessful assassination attempt against the Shah of Iran, Naser-al-Din Shah, in retaliation for his decision to order the execution of Báb. While Baháʼu'lláh strongly condemned the assassination, and renounced the movement's early anti-Qajar stance, on 15 August 1852 radicalized Bábís once again attempted to assassinate the Shah, with this second attempt proving likewise unsuccessful. Notwithstanding the assassins' claim that they were working alone, and that Baháʼu'lláh had not participated in the planning of the assassination attempt, the entire Bábí community was pronounced guilty of the plot, and a massacre of several thousand Bábís followed. From that point onwards, Naser held a deep-rooted suspicion of the Bábís and Baha'is, viewing them as political agitators similar to the anarchists of Europe.

The Shah of Iran and the Sultan of the Ottoman Empire, ʻAbdu'l-ʻAziz, successively exiled Baháʼu'lláh from Persia to Baghdad, then Constantinople, and eventually to the fortress of Acre for lifetime incarceration.

By the end of the 19th century, there was growing dissension within the Qajar state, and in an effort to draw public attention away from the government and instead toward the evils of the 'devious sect', charges of subversion and conspiracy against the Bábís and Baháʼís increased. In the early 20th century, the Baháʼís were seen as being non-conformist in a society which looked to comfort in unified ideals and fearful of losing its perceived unique Shiʻa culture due to increasing influence from outside the boundaries of Persia. During the 1940s, the Iranian government and Muslim clerical groups started espousing the belief that the religion had been intentionally manufactured by Western powers to destroy the "unity of the Muslim nation", and that those who did not share the beliefs of the Muslim majority were agents of foreign powers.

By the 1960s opponents of the Baháʼí Faith increasingly placed charges of spying on Baháʼí, along with other forms of connections to foreign powers rather than simply labelling Baháʼís as heretics. These new charges helped define a new 'other' and reaffirmed a threatened Shiʻi self. This new attitude towards the Baháʼís was now not confined to the clerics, but was also rampant among the secular Iranian middle-class. In the 1970s accusations of Baháʼís being numerous in the Shah's regime surfaced, as well as there being a perception that Baháʼís were generally better off than the rest of the population. Historian H.E. Chehabi notes that while the teachings of the Baháʼí Faith mitigate the possibility of a preferential attachment of Baháʼís to Iran, Iran is seen by Baháʼís as the "Cradle of the Cause" to which it owes a degree of affection by Baháʼís worldwide.

Since the founding of the state of Israel in 1948, there have also been several accusations of Baháʼís being associated with Zionist activities, largely on the grounds that the Baháʼí World Centre is located in the modern boundaries of Israel, even though the centre was founded prior to 1948, and was not established at the invitation of the Israeli government. The Baháʼí World Centre has its historical origins in the area that was at the time part of Ottoman Syria. This dates back to the 1850s and 1860s and the repeated forced exiles of Baha'i leaders.

=== Since the Iranian revolution ===
After the overthrow of the Shah during the Iranian Revolution, the new Islamic regime targeted the Baháʼís in Iran, since they held a deep hostility toward them as they saw them as infidels. As nationalistic beliefs increased in Iran, Baháʼís were viewed as unpatriotic and connected with foreign elements. During this time the Baháʼís were accused of being anti-Islamic, pro-Zionism agents, supporters of the Shah's regime, and being engaged with the governments of foreign powers. The National Spiritual Assembly of the Baháʼís of Iran, both privately and publicly, addressed the charges against them point by point, but received no response to their rebuttal.

In January 1980 with the election of President Bani Sadr and the continuing anti-Baháʼí sentiment, the Baháʼí Faith was officially described by the government as a political movement against the Iranian Revolution and Islam. Before the revolution, Bani Sadr had claimed the universal message of the Baháʼí Faith was connected with Western powers. In February 1980, the Iranian ambassador to the United Nations stated that Baháʼís were SAVAK agents and repeated the cleric's charges; only later when he broke with the regime in 1982 did he recant his previous statements.

By 1981, however, revolutionary courts no longer couched the execution of Baháʼís with political terms, and they instead cited only religious reasons. Also documents were given out to Baháʼís that if they would publicly embrace Islam, that their jobs, pensions and property would be reinstated. These documents were shown to the United Nations as evidence that the Iranian government was using the political accusations as a front to the real religious reason for the persecution of the Baháʼís.

In 1983, Iran's prosecutor general once again stated that the Baháʼís were not being persecuted because of their religious belief, but that instead they were spies, and that they were funnelling money outside the country. The National Spiritual Assembly of the Baháʼís of Iran, once again, addressed the issues raised by the prosecutor point by point; the letter was sent to various government agencies. The letter acknowledged that funds were being sent abroad as Baháʼí contributions to the shrines and holy places, but denied all other points, and asked for proof of the charges. No response was obtained from the government to this letter. The clerics continued to persecute the Baháʼís and charged the Baháʼís with "crimes against God" and Zionism.

In 1983 to a report to the Human Rights Commission of the United Nations the official view of the Islamic Republic was published in a twenty-page document; the document stated that Western powers had encouraged the founding of the Baháʼí Faith; that it was not actually a religion, but a political entity created by foreign powers, and that there was a link between the Baháʼí Faith and Zionism and SAVAK. The United Nations Human Rights Commission Sub-Commission Expert Mr. Eide stated that the publication provided by the Iranian government "recalled the publications disseminated in Europe in the 1920s and 1930s, which had contributed to severe prejudice costing the lives of hundreds of thousands of peoples. The Sub-Commission should be on guard against any recurrence of such campaigns".

The Iranian government's statement was not accepted by the United Nations as the UN had received no evidence from the Iranian government regarding its claims. The representative from Germany stated that "the documents concerning the Baháʼís showed that the latter were persecuted, not for criminal offences, but simply for their religious beliefs". The Iranian delegate dismissed the text of the Commission's resolution, and persecution of the Baháʼís continued.

In 1991, the Iranian government again gave a statement to the United Nations stating that since the administrative centre of the Baháʼí Faith is located in Israel, it is directly controlled by "Zionist forces", although the Baháʼí World Centre has its historical origins in the area that was once Ottoman Syria. In the late 1990s during Muhammad Khatami's presidency, the name-calling and outrageous accusations did not end, and with the election of President Mahmoud Ahmadinejad in 2005, the frequency and intensity of these accusations has increased.

== Russian and British ties ==
During the 19th century, the Indian subcontinent was part of the overseas possessions of Britain; at the same time Russia had been expanding its influence south and east into the Caucasus and Central Asia toward India, and a rivalry started between Britain and Russia over the influence of one another in Central Asia. The middle zone of land that was located between India and Russian holdings included Persia, and was a region of great significance, where both Russia and Britain worked to gain influence.

The support of the British government during the Persian Constitutional Revolution, the Anglo-Russian Convention which clearly defined the borders of Russian and British influence in Central Asia (thus bringing an end to the Great Game), the occupation of Iranian territory during the First and Second World Wars by Russian, Ottoman and British forces, all encouraged the development of antagonism in Iran towards these foreign powers. Muslim clerics and other anti-Baháʼí groups connected the Baháʼí Faith, and its predecessor the Bábí movement, to the governments of Britain and Russia to project the sentiments towards these two groups onto the Baháʼís.

=== Russian ties ===
In God Passes By, Shoghi Effendi alludes to the protection the Russian ambassador gave Baháʼu'lláh on different occasions, first after the attempted assassination of Naser al-Din Shah Qajar and again after the decision to exile Baháʼu'lláh from Iran, expressing his "desire to take Baháʼu'lláh under the protection of his government, and offered to extend every facility for His removal to Russia." In his Súriy-i-Haykal, Baháʼu'lláh included the Lawh-i-Malik-i-Rús, praising Czar Alexander II of Russia in these terms: "when this Wronged One was sore-afflicted in prison, the minister of the highly esteemed government (of Russia)—may God, glorified and exalted be He, assist him!—exerted his utmost endeavor to compass My deliverance. Several times permission for My release was granted. Some of the ʻulamás of the city, however, would prevent it. Finally, My freedom was gained through the solicitude and the endeavor of His Excellency the Minister. …His Imperial Majesty, the Most Great Emperor—may God, exalted and glorified be He, assist him!—extended to Me for the sake of God his protection—a protection which has excited the envy and enmity of the foolish ones of the earth." When Baháʼu'lláh and his family traveled from Iran to Baghdad subsequent to his exile in 1853, they were accompanied by a representative of the Russian legation.

Opponents of the faith base much of their amplification and exaggeration of these "ties" on a document, allegedly a "memoir" of Dolgorukov (also known as Dolgoruki), who was the Russian ambassador to Persia from 1846 to 1854. The memoir states that Dolgorukov created the Bábí and Baháʼí religions so as to weaken Iran and Shiʻa Islam. The document was first published in 1943 in Persian in Mashhad, and shortly thereafter published again in Tehran with some of the most glaring errors corrected. The book still, however, contains so many historical errors that it is inconceivable that it is genuine.

The memoir states that Dolgorukov used to attend gatherings of Hakím Ahmad Gílání, where he would meet Baháʼu'lláh. However, Gílání died in 1835, three years before Dolgorukov's arrival in the Persia. There are numerous other errors relating to the dates and times of events that the memoir describes; the memoir describes events after the death of personages, or when the people involved were young children, or when they were in different parts of the world.

Dolgorukov actually only became aware of the Bábí movement in 1847, three years after it started, and his dispatches show that he was initially afraid of the movement spreading into the Caucasus, and asked that the Báb be moved away from the Russian border. In 1852, after a failed assassination attempt against the Shah for which the entire Bábí community was blamed, many Bábís, including Baháʼu'lláh, who had no role in the attempt and later severely condemned it, were arrested in a sweep. When Baháʼu'lláh was jailed by the Shah, his family went to Mírzá Majid Ahi who was married to a sister of Baháʼu'lláh, and was working as the secretary to the Russian Legation in Tehran. Baháʼu'lláh's family asked Mírzá Majid to go to Dolgorukov and ask him to intercede on behalf of Baháʼu'lláh, and Dolgorukov agreed.

The memoirs, however, extend this assistance to all facets of Baháʼu'lláh's life. In one edition of the memoir, Dolgorukov is said to have provided money for Baháʼu'lláh to build a house in Acre, but Dolgorukov died in 1867, before Baháʼu'lláh arrived in Acre. Thus newer editions of the memoir state that Dolgorukov sent money for a house to be built in Edirne. As Dolgorukov left the Russian diplomatic service in 1854 and died in 1867, he was unable to interact with Baháʼu'lláh in the manner in which the memoir states.

Communist Soviet sources produced polemical pamphlets in 1930, an encyclopedic article in 1933, and most seriously in 1938 "monstrous accusations" accusing Baháʼís of being 'closely linked with the leaders of Trotskyite-Bukharinist and Dashnak-Musavat bands'. Following this numerous arrests and oppression of the religion, Baháʼís across the Soviet Union were being sent to prisons and camps or sent abroad. Baháʼí communities in 38 cities across Soviet territories ceased to exist.

=== British ties ===
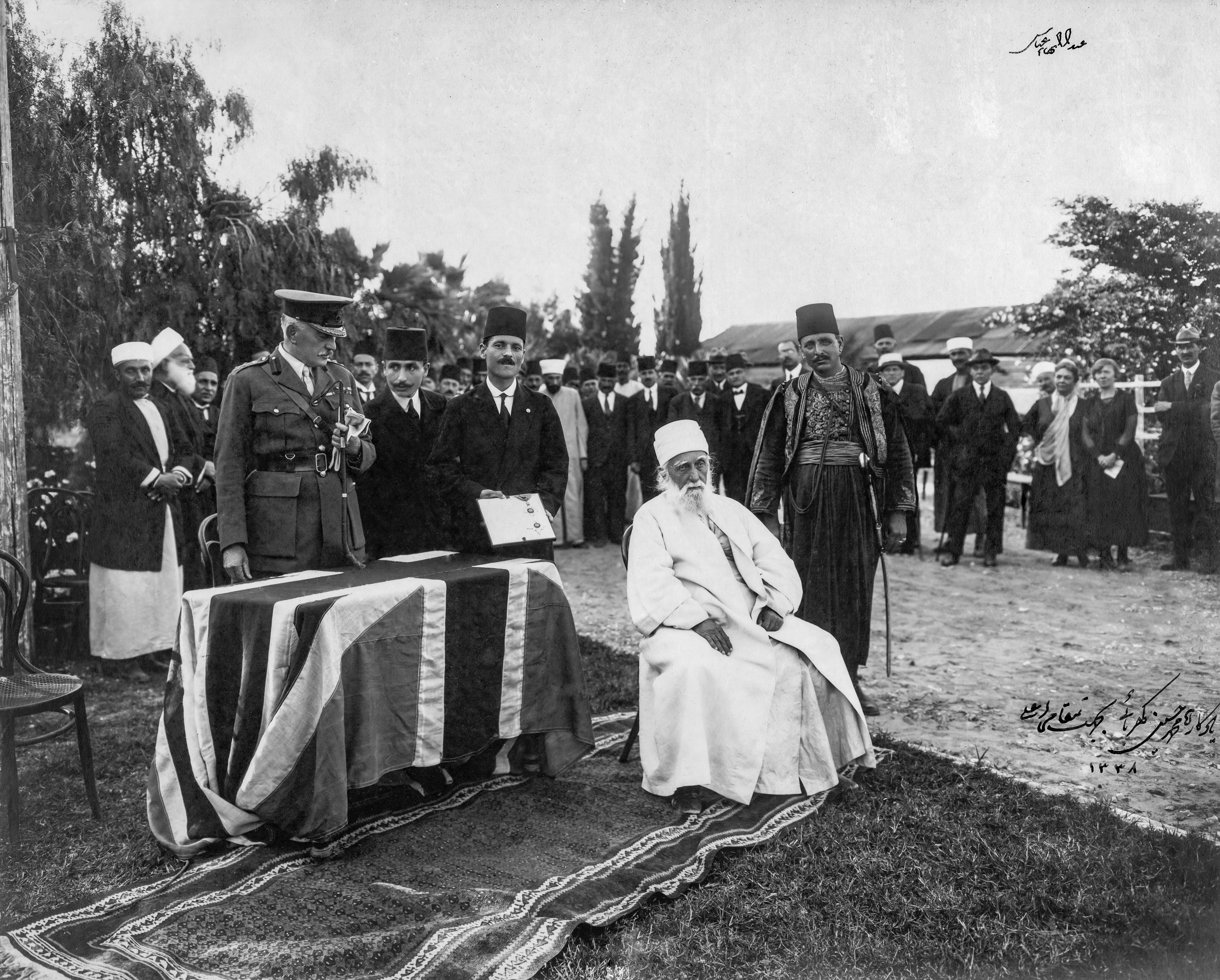
ʻAbdu'l-Bahá was knighted by the British army in 1920.

There have also been claims that the Bábí movement was started by the British, and that the Baháʼí Faith maintains ties with the British government; the supposed connection to the British have only ever been supported by false evidence. Firaydun Adamiyyat, in a biography on Naser-al-Din Shah's first Prime Minister Amir Kabir, stated that Mulla Husayn, the Báb's first disciple, was in actuality a British agent who was recruited by Arthur Conolly, a British intelligence officer, explorer and writer. Adamiyyat states that the evidence of such an accusation appears in Conolly's book Journey to the North of India Overland from England through Russia, Persia, and Affghaunistaun, but no mention of Mulla Husayn or the Báb appears in the book. In later editions of Adamiyyat's biography on Amir Kabir, the fabrication has been removed.

Accusations of supposed ties to the British have also arisen from the knighting in 1920 of ʻAbdu'l-Bahá, then head of the Baháʼí faith, by the British authorities in Mandatory Palestine. According to Harry Charles Luke, an official in the Colonial Office who served as assistant Governor of Jerusalem, ʻAbdu'l-Bahá "on the 4th December, 1919, was created by King George V a K.B.E. for valuable services rendered to the British Government in the early days of the Occupation." According to a recently published PhD, ʻAbdu'l-Bahá, received this award solely in recognition of his "humanitarian work in Palestine" during the war, especially his distribution of grain from his personal supply, which averted a famine in Northern Palestine. He was ceremonially knighted on 27 April 1920, an event which was prominently reported in the Star of the West as "a most wonderful celebration."

== Political contacts in the Ottoman Empire ==
During this period, ʻAbdu'l-Bahá communicated with a number of different actors who were civilian, parliamentarians of the Young Turks, opposed to the reign of Sultan Abdul Hamid II, including Namık Kemal, Ziya Pasha and Midhat Pasha, in an attempt to disseminate Baháʼí thought into their political ideology.

‛Abdu'l-Bahá also had contact with military leaders as well, including such individuals as Bursalı Mehmet Tahir Bey and Hasan Bedreddin. The latter, who was involved in the overthrow of Sultan Abdülaziz, is commonly known as Bedri Paşa or Bedri Pasha and is referred to in Persian Baháʼí sources as Bedri Bey (Badri Beg). He was a Baháʼí who translated ‛Abdu'l-Baha's works into French.

ʻAbdu'l-Bahá also met Muhammad Abduh, one of the key figures of Islamic Modernism and the Salafi movement, in Beirut, at a time when the two men were both opposed to the Ottoman ulama and shared similar goals of religious reform. Rashid Rida asserts that during his visits to Beirut, ʻAbdu'l-Bahá would attend Abduh's study sessions. Regarding the meetings of ʻAbdu'l-Bahá and Muhammad ʻAbduh, Shoghi Effendi asserts that "His several interviews with the well-known Shaykh Muhammad ʻAbdu served to enhance immensely the growing prestige of the community and spread abroad the fame of its most distinguished member."

Due to the concerns of Hamid II views of ʻAbdu'l-Bahá's activities, a Commission of Inquiry interviewed him in 1905, with the result that he was almost exiled to Fezzan. In response, ʻAbdu'l-Bahá wrote the sultan a letter protesting that his followers refrain from involvement in partisan politics and that his tariqa had guided many Americans to Islam. Subsequent to the Young Turk Revolution ʻAbdu'l-Bahá was released from his imprisonment and allowed to travel away from Palestine. He freely expressed his disapproval of Sultan Abdul Hamid II and his policies. ʻAbdu'l-Bahá would continue to praise the Committee of Union and Progress, and during his tour of North America in 1912, the Ottoman embassy in Washington, D.C. held a dinner in his honor.

== Alleged Baháʼí ties to Zionism ==
Baháʼís have also been accused of ties to Zionism, a movement that supported the establishment of a Jewish homeland in the territory defined as the historic Land of Israel (roughly corresponding to Canaan, the Holy Land, or the region of Palestine). This claim is typically advanced by noting that the most holy shrines of the Baháʼís are located in current-day Israel. However, Baháʼu'lláh was banished from Persia by Naser-al-Din Shah, at which time Baháʼu'lláh went to Baghdad in the Ottoman Empire. Later, he was exiled by the Sultan of the Ottoman Empire, at the behest of the Persian Shah, to territories further away from Iran and finally to Acre in Syria, which was only incorporated into the state of Israel a century later.

Baháʼu'lláh died in 1892 near Acre, and the burial place is in Bahji. Following his death, Baháʼu'lláh's son and appointed successor, ʻAbdu'l-Bahá, lead the religion until his death in 1921. He is buried in Haifa, which became part of British Mandatory Palestine during the events of the First World War. Another important figure for Baháʼís, the Báb, whose remains were secretly transferred by Baháʼís to Palestine in 1909, is also buried in Haifa. Israel was not formed until 1948, almost 60 years after Baháʼu'lláh's death, 40 years after the Báb's remains were brought to the region, and 27 years after ʻAbdu'l-Bahá's death.

On 23 February 1914, at the eve of World War I, Baron Edmond James de Rothschild, a member of the Rothschild banking family, stopped in Haifa for a few hours during one of his early trips to Palestine. Rothschild was a benefactor of thousands of Jews then settling in Palestine, and was a leading advocate and financier of the Zionist movement. That evening a general meeting was held at the home of ‘Abdu’l-Bahá. ‘Abdu’l-Bahá is reported to have commented on Rothschild's arrival to Haifa in the gathering that evening, although it does not appear the two had interacted at all that day. ‘Abdu’l-Bahá remarked:

"Today Baron Rothschild came to Haifa. He is one of the wealthiest men of Europe. He is much interested in the Jewish colonization of Palestine and is devoting much of his time and attention to this problem. Now he has gone to Tiberias. He is busy all the time. He could not stay longer than one hour."

He went on to comment on the voracious nature of the pursuit of wealth, stating that "[wealth] bewilders the sight of its charmed victims with showy appearances and draws them on and on to the edge of yawning chasms. It makes a person self-centred, self-occupied, forgetful of God and of holy things."

Subsequent to the British mandate over Palestine following the First World War, ʻAbdu'l-Bahá remarked,

If the Zionists will mingle with the other races and live in unity with them, they will succeed. If not, they will meet certain resistance. For the present I think a neutral government like the British administration would be best. A Jewish government might come later.
There is too much talk today of what the Zionists are going to do here. There is no need of it. Let them come and do more and say less.
The Zionists should make it clear that their principle is to elevate all the people here and to develop the country for all its inhabitants. This land must be developed, according to the promises of the prophets Isaiah, Jeremiah, and Zachariah. If they come in such a spirit they will not fail.
They must not work to separate the Jews from the other Palestinians. Schools should be open to all nationalities here, business companies, etc. The Turks went down because they attempted to rule over foreign races. The British are always in power because they keep fair and promote harmony.
This is the path to universal peace here as elsewhere - Unity. We must prevent strife by all means.

— Star of the West (8 September 1919)

Baháʼís have from time to time negotiated with the government of Israel over such matters as the acquisition of properties that currently compose the Baháʼí World Centre buildings. For example, a cablegram sent by Shoghi Effendi on 12 November 1952 announced the "acquisition of vitally-needed property" of the Mansion of Bahjí and the area around it from "the Development Authority of the State of Israel...The exchange of said property, including land and houses, was made possible by the precipitate flight of the former Arab owners."

Similarly, the mansion of Mazra'ih was transferred by the nascent Israeli government from a Muslim waqf to the Baháʼí administration in 1951.

"Masra'ih is a Moslem religious endowment, and it is consequently impossible, under existing laws in this country, for it to be sold. However, as the friends are aware, the Ministry of Religions, due to the direct intervention of the Minister himself, Rabbi Maimon, consented, in the face of considerable opposition, to deliver Masra'ih to the Baha'is as a Holy Place to be visited by Baha'i pilgrims. This means that we rent it from the Department of Moslem and Druze affairs in the Ministry of Religions. The head of this Department is also a Rabbi, Dr. Hirschberg. Recently he, his wife and party, visited all the Baha'i properties in Haifa and 'Akka, following upon a very pleasant tea party in the Western Pilgrim House with the members of the International Baha'i Council." (Baháʼí News, no. 244, June 1951, p. 4)

The mansion was ultimately purchased by the Baháʼís in 1973.

Since the Iranian Revolution there have been accusations that the Baháʼís support Israel because they send fund contributions to the Baháʼí World Centre which is located in northern Israel. The donations are used in the Baháʼí World Centre for upkeep of the Baháʼí properties, as well as the administration of the worldwide Baháʼí community. The National Spiritual Assembly of the Baháʼís of Iran in a 1983 letter to the Iranian government stated that while Muslims were praised for sending money out of the country to Iraq and Jerusalem for the upkeep of their religious shrines, when Baháʼís sent money for the upkeep of their own shrines it was considered an unforgivable sin.

== Baháʼís as agents of the Shah's regime and its secret police ==
Another criticism claims that the Baháʼís, during the time of the Pahlavi dynasty, collaborated with the SAVAK, the Iranian secret police, and held positions of power in the government. Even before the Iranian revolution, the Baháʼís, viewed as the "other" in Iranian society, were held responsible by the rest of the Iranians for the abusive suppression by SAVAK and the Shah's unpopular policies. After the revolution, the assertion that the Baháʼís were agents of the Shah perhaps partly originates because Baháʼís did not help the revolutionary groups, since one of the tenets of the Baháʼí Faith is to obey the government of one's country.

The Baháʼí International Community has, however, stated that the Baháʼí community in Iran was the victim of the Shah's regime, and that SAVAK was one of the main ways of persecuting the Baháʼís. For example, Reza Shah's government ordered the closure of Baháʼí schools, such as Tehran's Tarbiyat school for boys and girls, in 1934. Also during the month of Ramadan in 1955, when the Shah's government needed to distract the general population from its decision to join the Baghdad Pact together with the British and American governments, it sought the support of the clerics. Ayatollah Seyyed Hossein Borujerdi, acting as the Marja Taqlid, a Grand Ayatollah with the authority to make legal decisions within the confines of Islamic law, pushed the Shah's government to support the persecution of the Baháʼí community.

The 1955 attacks were particularly destructive and widespread due to an orchestrated campaign by the government and clergy who utilized the national Iranian radio station and its official newspapers to spread hatred which led to widespread mob violence against Baháʼís. The Shah's military also occupied the Baháʼí centre in Tehran, which was destroyed in the violence. Mottahedeh states that under the Pahlavi dynasty, the Baháʼís were actually more a "political pawn" than a collaborator, and that Reza Shah's government toleration of Baháʼís in the early 20th-century was more a sign of secular rule and an attempt to weaken clerical influence than a signal of favour for the Baháʼís.

There is also evidence that SAVAK collaborated with Islamic groups throughout the 1960s and 1970s in harassing Baháʼís. SAVAK also had links to Hojjatieh, a radical anti-Baháʼí group. Rahnema and Nomani state that the Shah gave Hojjatieh free rein for their activities toward the Baháʼís. Keddie states that the accusations of Baháʼís being part of SAVAK were mainly false pretexts for persecution.

With regards to the accusation that Baháʼís held many prominent positions in the government of Mohammad Reza Pahlavi, there is no empirical study that endeavours to determine the truth of such an accusation. There were a number of individuals who were part of the government and who had Baháʼí backgrounds, but were not Baháʼís themselves. One problem that arises is the definition of a Baháʼí: a Baháʼí is a member of a voluntary association that admits people only when they meet certain religious qualifications, and one can choose to become, remain or cease to be a Baháʼí. However, Muslims who do not recognize the possibility of apostasy (leaving one's religion) may not understand that individuals are free to reject their previous, in this case Baháʼí, beliefs .

Baháʼís have used the term Baháʼízada to refer to people of Baháʼí background who are not Baháʼís themselves or part of the Baháʼí community; there is no Muslim equivalent of the term. Of the Baháʼís who held positions near the Shah, the best known is the Shah's personal physician, Abdol Karim Ayadi. While Asadullah Sanii, another Baháʼí, was appointed Minister of Defence, the Baháʼí community of Iran revoked his administrative rights — as he had accepted a political position and Baháʼís are prohibited from involvement in partisan politics — the public, however, still continued to associate him with his previous religion. Parviz Sabeti, a SAVAK official, was raised in a Baháʼí family, but had left the religion and was not a member of the community by the time he started working with the agency.

Other people who were associated with the Baháʼí Faith either had Baháʼí backgrounds or were not connected with the religion at all. For example, it was often rumoured that the Prime Minister Amir-Abbas Hoveida was a Baháʼí. While Hoveida's father had been a Baháʼí, he had left the religion and Hoveida himself was not religious. Other people rumoured to be Baháʼís included Mahnaz Afkhami, who was the Minister for Women's Affairs and the daughter of a Baháʼí mother, and Farrokhroo Parsa, a cabinet member who was not connected to the religion at all. Chehabi notes that the allegations that half of the Shah's cabinet were Baháʼís are fanciful and, given the persecution the Baháʼís have suffered, irresponsible exaggerations.

== Alleged Baháʼí ties to Freemasonry ==
Iranian critics of the Baháʼí Faith have accused the religion of having ties to Freemasonry. As Freemasonry originated in the West, and is perceived as a secretive society, many in Iran connect the fraternity with the introduction of foreign ideas into the country which they perceive as undermining Iranian values. Claims were made that many of the earliest Masonic lodges, such as Malkom Khan's faramush-khanih, which were founded in 1858, prior to the emergence of the Baha'i Faith, were linked to European lodges. However, Freemasonry was brought to Iran by Iranians who had encountered the fraternity in other parts of the world.

Specific accusations connecting the Baháʼí Faith to Freemasonry often include an assertion that Dhabih Qurban, who was a well-known Baháʼí, was also a freemason. This assertion is based on an Iranian book publishing documents related to Freemasonry in the country; that book states that in specific pages of Fazel Mazandarani's book on the Baháʼí Faith there are statements that Dhabih Qurban is a freemason, but in fact Freemasony is not mentioned in the pages of the referenced Baháʼí book. Furthermore, the Iranian book that is the source of the accusation includes a discussion between the grandmaster of the Grand Lodge of Iran, and the grandmaster notes that "no Baháʼís have become masons and this is repeated by others present with no-one disagreeing."

Shoghi Effendi, the head of the Baháʼí Faith in the first half of the 20th century, stated that the teachings of the Baha'i Faith expressly forbid membership in secret societies, and asked all Baháʼís to remove their memberships from all supposed secret societies, including the freemasons, so that they can serve the teachings of the Baháʼí Faith without compromising their independence.

== See also ==
- Criticism of the Baháʼí Faith
