= Muhammad Mustafá Baghdádí =

One of the nineteen Apostles of Bahá'u'lláh

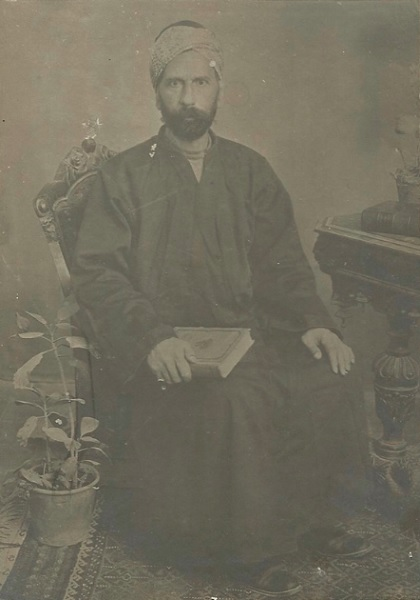
Muhammad Mustafá Baghdádí

Mírzá Muḥammad Muṣṭafá al-Baghdádí (1837/8—1910) was a prominent Iraqi adherent of the Baháʼí faith and one of 19 Apostles of Baháʼu'lláh. Mustafá was among the leading Baháʼís in Iraq until he moved to Beirut in the late 1870s, where he coordinated pilgrims going to see Baháʼu'lláh in ʻAkká, and later he was involved with the movement of the Báb's remains to ʻAkká.

As a child, his family hosted Táhirih in Baghdad and later accompanied her on a trip to Iran, where they met Mullá Husayn.

== Background and family ==
Mustafá was the son of Shaykh Muhammad Shibl (a.k.a. Shaikh Mohammad Šebl) Baghdadi, a high-ranking ulama of the city. Mustafa's father, grandfather (Sayyed Darvish), great-grandfather (Sayyed Shebl), and great-great-grandfather (Sayyed Sharif Kazemi) were all theologians in Kufa, then his father moved to Baghdad in 1827-28, a decade before Mustafá was born, taking the role of teaching theosophy for Siyyid Kázim. Mustafá's father became Kázim's personal representative in Baghdád, and later became one of the first Shaykhi leaders to become a Bábí in the mid-1840s, having been taught by Mullá ʻAlíy-i-Bastámí (one of the Báb's Letters of the Living) when he was brought to Baghdád and imprisoned. He later attempted to meet the Báb in Iran, but due to the Báb's banishment to Azerbaijan, he went to Khurasan and met Quddús instead.

=== Travel to Iran ===
When Mustafá was nine years old, his family hosted Táhirih for about ten weeks in 1846, where she taught unveiled and enraged students by speaking of the need to abrogate the Sharia. Mustafá waited upon her and transmitted her messages in Baghdad and later Iran. The letter from the Báb bestowing the title Táhirih was read to a gathering of people at their home by Mustafá's father. When she was eventually expelled from Baghdád, Mustafá, his father, and about thirty armed men left with her to Iran in March 1847 on a trip paid for by Mustafá's family. They arrived in Kirmanshah, then Qazvin for one month, after which they separated from Táhirih and went to Tehran, at her request, to meet Mullá Husayn on his way to Mazandaran. They then returned to Baghdad, where his father died on 11 July 1850.

== Service to Baháʼu'lláh ==
During the period that Baháʼu'lláh was in Baghdád (1853-1863), Mustafá became devoted to him and was among the few who recognized him as the Báb's prophesied He whom God shall make manifest, before Baháʼu'lláh's proclamation in 1863. After Baháʼu'lláh's further banishment, Mustafá was recognized as a leader among the Baháʼís in Iraq and sought after for help.

In 1867, 53 Baháʼís of Baghdad wrote an appeal to the Congress of the United States for assistance in freeing Baháʼu'lláh from confinement by Ottoman authorities. This appeal arrived at the American Consul in Beirut and was commented upon by American missionary Henry Harris Jessup.

Beginning in 1868, and instigated by conversions of Sunni Muslims to the Baháʼí Faith, the Baháʼís of Baghdad were arrested and imprisoned repeatedly. In April–May 1868, three or four Baháʼís of Baghdad were killed by Persian Shias, likely offended by Baháʼís celebrating holy days during their mourning ceremonies.

In 1872, Mustafá was attacked by an angry mob and nearly killed. Two years later he spent eight months in prison, along with many other Baháʼís of Baghdad. Upon his release in 1874, he traveled to ʻAkká and Baháʼu'lláh instructed him to move to Beirut.

While in Beirut he was the main conduit for coordinating Baháʼí pilgrims on their way to Palestine. Mustafá became the liaison between the Ottoman political authorities and the Baháʼís, and his home became a meeting place of dignitaries such as the mufti and ʻAbdu'l-Bahá's family. For decades, he was the focal point of internal and external communications. The "facilities provided by [Baha'u'llah's] staunch follower, Muhammad Mustafá, now established in Beirut to safeguard the interests of the pilgrims who passed through that city" was listed by Shoghi Effendi as one several milestones that attested to the vitality of the religion toward the end of Baháʼu'lláh's life.

His home in Beirut was host to the remains of the Báb for twelve days in January 1899, as they made their way secretly from Persia to ʻAkká, via Baghdad, Damascus, and Beirut. The casket was carried by hand by Mustafá and seven others from Beirut to ʻAkká, arriving 31 January 1899.

After the passing of Baháʼu'lláh in 1892, he served as ʻAbdu'l-Bahá's representative in Beirut. As he got older, his eyesight began to fail. In 1910 he moved north to Alexandretta (Iskandarun) where he died soon after.

== Legacy ==
Mustafá wrote a chronicle of the Bábí movement, ar-Risalah al-Amriyyah (The Treatise on the Cause), that was appended to Ar-Risalah at-Tis` `Ashariyyah (The Treatise of Nineteen) by Ahmad Sohrab. The works were published in Cairo in 1919. Abbas Amanat wrote in Resurrection and Renewal of Mustafá's work,

Another published account of this kind is that of Aqa Muhammad Mustafa al-Baghdadi, which was compiled at the request of Abul-Fazl Gulpayigani. He was an Arab Babi and later Baha'i (still in his early youth when his father, Shaykh Muhammad Shibl al-Baghdadi, became one of the early Babi converts in Iraq and a follower of Qurrat al-`Ayn). In his narrative, which is compiled mainly from his own and his father's recollections, he describes the mission of Bastami to the `Atabat [Shi`ite shrine cities of Iraq that include Najaf and Karbala'] and gives some valuable information about Qurrat al-`Ayn and her supporters.

Mustafá wrote poetry, which was requested by Edward Browne and is now kept at the Cambridge University Library. Browne met him on 22 April 1890 in Beirut, on his return from meeting Baháʼu'lláh. Browne wrote of the encounter,

On the evening of the following day (Tuesday, April 22nd) we entered [Beirut], and halted for a while to rest and refresh ourselves with tea at the house of a Bábí of Baghdad which was situated in the outskirts of the town. This man had as a child gone with his father to Persia in the hope of seeing the Báb. This he was unable to do, the Báb being at that time confined in the fortress of Chihrík, but at Teheran he had seen Mulla Huseyn of Bushraweyh. I asked him what manner of man Mulla Huseyn was. 'Lean and fragile to look at,' he answered, 'but keen and bright as the sword which never left his side. For the rest, he was not more than thirty or thirty-five years old, and his raiment was white.'

The Guardian of the Baháʼí faith, Shoghi Effendi listed Muhammad Mustafá as one of the nineteen Apostles of Baháʼu'lláh, giving him an equivalent level of distinction to Baháʼís as the Twelve Apostles are to Christians.

Muhammad Mustafá's burial was personally managed by ʻAbdu'l-Bahá, who wrote the epitaph for his tombstone. In Memorials of the Faithful, ʻAbdu'l-Bahá wrote of him,

The opposition was powerful, the penalty obvious, the friends, every one of them, terrified, and off in some corner hiding their belief; at such a time this intrepid personality boldly went about his business, and like a man, faced up to every tyrant. The one individual who, in the year seventy, was famed in `Iráq for his love of Bahá'u'lláh, was this honored person. A few other souls, then in Baghdád and its environs, had crept away into nooks and crannies and, imprisoned in their own lethargy, there they remained. But this admirable Muhammad-Mustafa would boldly, proudly come and go like a man, and the hostile, because of his physical strength and his courage, were afraid to attack him.

He had three sons: Hosayn Eqbal (1864-1952), ʻAli Ehsan (1874-1917), and Ziaʾ Mabsut (1884-1937). A fourth son, Amin Abu'l-Wafa, was born 1878 but died 1898. Zia Mabsut was a leading Baháʼí in the United States, joined the editorial staff of the Star of the West from 1911 to 1915, accompanied ʻAbdu'l-Bahá on his journeys, supervised the construction of the Baháʼí House of Worship, played a leading role in the American race amity movement, and wrote his own memoirs, al-Reḥla al-baḡdādiya. One of ʻAli Ehsan's sons, Jamil Baghdadi (1913–87), was for many years the secretary of the National Spiritual Assembly of Iraq and imprisoned for six years (1973–79) during a government crackdown on Baháʼí activities. Another son of ʻAli Ehsan, ʿAbbās Baḡdādi (1915-1975), was professor of geology at the University of Baghdad (1961–71), imprisoned during the crackdown, and died in prison on 20 January 1975. Another son of ʻAli Ehsan, Adib Rażi Baḡdādi (1905-1988), was a member of the National Spiritual Assembly of Iraq as both treasurer or secretary, the first pioneer to southern Yemen (1 December 1952) and received the title Knight of Baháʼu'lláh, and was later of the National Spiritual Assemblies of Kuwait and Lebanon.
