= Kázim-i-Samandar =

S͟hayk͟h Káẓim-i-Samandar (Persian: کاظم سمندر; died 1918), known as Samandar, was an eminent follower of Baháʼu'lláh, the founder of the Baháʼí Faith. He was born to a prominent Baháʼí family of Qazvin of Bábí and Shaykhi background. Favored by Baháʼu'lláh, he was identified as one of his nineteen Apostles.

== Early life ==
Samandar was born Muhammad Kázim Qazvíní in February 1844 in Qazvin, the eldest surviving son of Shaykh Muhammad Qazvíní. Shaykh Muhammad was an early Bábí and later accepted the Baháʼí Faith. His father was bastioned in Qazvín and attained the presence of the Báb who was then imprisoned in Máh-Kú. Later Shaykh Muhammad was entitled Nabil by Baháʼu'lláh. He was named after Siyyid Kázim whom his family had close connections with. His mother was a disciple of Táhirih. Samandar was of a wealthy mercantile family, and Shaykh Muhammad Qazvini had made a success of the business. From an early age he was a devout Baháʼí, and clearly remembered the days of persecution as a little boy.

== Prominence ==
Samandar was living in Qazvin when a group of very active Azalis begun disputing Baháʼu'lláh and his claims. Samandar studied the writings of both Azali and Baháʼu'lláh. He subsequently became a staunch believer in Baháʼu'lláh, and wrote a pamphlet denouncing the Azali's and stating they based their claims on nothing. The document was read widely, and reduced influence of the Azali's in Qazvin.

Baháʼu'lláh then renamed Muhammad Kázim Qazvíní as Samandar a Persian word meaning phoenix. Baháʼu'lláh also sent Samandar numerous tablets and prayers in his honour, much of which is still extant. The most famous is perhaps Lawh-i-Fu'ád (tablet of Fuʼád) which was addressed to Samandar. He worked tirelessly teaching the faith in Persia. He traveled all around Iran teaching people of the Baháʼí Faith and its principles. ʻAbdu'l-Bahá also kept in regular correspondence with him.

He had many children; a mixture of boys and girls of whom all married into prominent Baháʼí families of Persia. His most famous child is possibly Tarázʼu'lláh Samandarí, a Hand of the Cause of God. In Acre Samandar's daughter Thurayyá Khánum was married to Baháʼu'lláh's younger son Mírzá Ḍíyáʼu'lláh. She later became a covenant breaker devastating Samandar. He made two pilgrimages to ʻAkká to visit Baháʼu'lláh and the Baháʼí holy family (ʻAbdu'l-Bahá, Ásíyih Khánum, Bahíyyih Khánum and Munírih).

== Death ==
Samanadar died February 5, 1918. Shoghi Effendi described him a “flame of the love of God” and identified him as one of the Apostles of Baháʼu'lláh. His memoirs Tárikh-i-Samandar was regularly referred to and seen a source of valuable Baháʼí history. His relatives are known by the surname Samandarí.
