= Adíb =

Follower of Baháʼu'lláh, the founder of the Baháʼí faith

Mírzá Ḥasan
- حج مرزا حسن أديب العلماء
- Adíb

Personal life
- Born: September 1848
- Died: 2 September 1919 (71-72)

Religious life
- Religion: Baháʼí Faith

Hájí Mírzá Ḥasan-i-Adíbu'l-ʻUlamá (Arabic: حاج میرزا حسن اديب‌العلماء; September 1848–2 September 1919), known as Mírzá Ḥasan or Adíb, was an eminent follower of Baháʼu'lláh, the founder of the Baháʼí Faith. He was appointed a Hand of the Cause and identified as one of the nineteen Apostles of Baháʼu'lláh.

== Background ==
Mírzá Hasan was born in Talaqán in September 1848. His father was an eminent Islamic cleric and Mírzá Hasan went through the usual religious education in Tihrán and Mashhad. He became the Friday prayer leader at the Daru'l-Funun, Iran's first technical college set up by the Shah, where he received his title of Adíbu'l-'Ulamá (littérateur of the 'Ulamá) In 1874 he was employed by the Qajar princes, writing a large number of encyclopedic books on their behalf.

== Conversion ==
Mírzá Hasan's acceptance of Baháʼu'lláh was the result of several Baháʼí friends, including Nabíl-i-Akbar, who prompted him to investigate the teachings. Upon converting to the Baháʼí Faith, he was expelled from his work. In 1889, his conversion was made official and he soon became one of the four Hands of the Cause appointed by Baháʼu'lláh.

== Service and final years ==
After the passing of Baháʼu'lláh in 1892, Mírzá Hasan became instrumental in dealing with the activities of Covenant-breakers in Iran. He later participated in the meetings that evolved into the Central Spiritual Assembly of Tihrán, which later became the National Spiritual Assembly of Iran, of which he was the chairman.

In 1903, he travelled to Isfahan, where he was briefly imprisoned. From there he also visited Shiraz, Bombay, and ʻAkká, where ʻAbdu'l-Bahá instructed him to travel with an American Baháʼí to India and Burma to help spread the Baháʼí Faith in those areas.

After returning to Tehran, he died on 2 September 1919.
