= Mírzá Mahmúd =

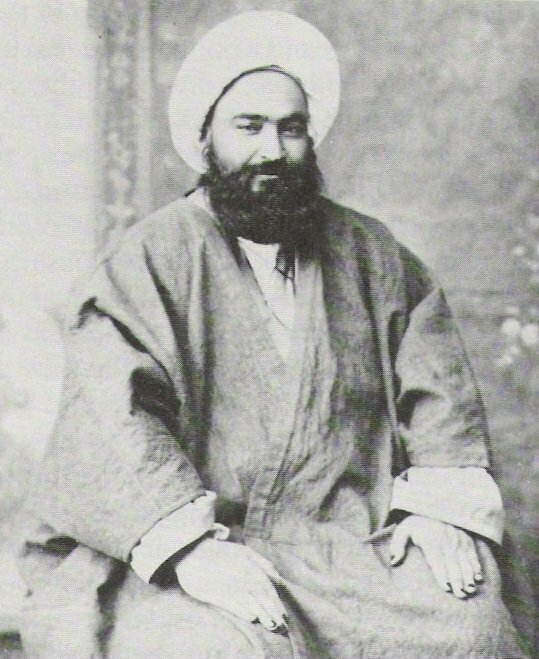

Mírzá Maḥmúd-i-Furúg͟hí (Persian: میرزا محمود ; died AH 1346 (1927/1928 CE)), also known as Fádil-i-Furúg͟hí, was an eminent follower of Baháʼu'lláh, the founder of the Baháʼí Faith. He was the only Iranian Baháʼí teacher who was given the chance to meet face to face with a Qajar Shah. He was later identified as one of the nineteen Apostles of Baháʼu'lláh.

== Background ==
Mírzá Mahmúd came from a remote village in Khurasan named Dúghábád. His father was Mullá Mírzá Muhammad, one of the few survivors of the battle of fort Tabarsi, who was an influential Shiʻa divine prior to becoming a Bábí. Mullá Mírzá Muhammad, who had never before used a weapon, was wounded five times by bullets or swords; but in the end he survived and made his way back home, where he faced persecution for his new faith.

Mullá Mírzá Muhammad was taken in chains to Mas͟hhad, and after a long interim in the prison was released again, only to become a devoted follower of Baháʼu'lláh. He travelled often to Ishqabad with his son Mírzá Mahmúd, where many persecuted Baháʼís settled. In Ishqabad, Mírzá Mahmúd became a well known teacher of the Baháʼí Faith, often dedicating himself to the welfare of the youth. One biographer described his time there:

"He was never impatient, never autocratic. Kind and considerate, he led the youth gently to better manners, better understanding, better conduct. And he was exceedingly modest."

(Eminent Baháʼís, pg. 160)

== Travels ==
The Islamic divines of Dúghábád caused the governor of the district to have Mírzá Mahmúd arrested for being a Baháʼí. He was sent in chains to Mas͟hhad. From his prison-cell, he managed to secretly send a letter to Nasiri'd-Din Shah, who issued an order for the release of Mírzá Mahmúd. The clerics of Mas͟hhad managed to have him exiled, rather than set free, to a remote corner of Khorasan named Kalát.

In Kalát, the governor soon became good friends with Mírzá Mahmúd, and informed him of the death of Baháʼu'lláh. In his grief, Mírzá Mahmúd began a three-day fast. On the fourth night, Baháʼu'lláh appeared to him in a dream, which he claimed gave him new life.

He then travelled to Haifa and Akka in Palestine where he met ʻAbdu'l-Bahá and then to Cairo where he met Mírzá Abu'l-Faḍl. He then returned to Tehran where he met face to face with the Qajar prince, Kamran Mírza, son of Nasser al-Din Shah and brother to Mozzafar al-Din Shah. He then travelled to Ashgabat, to Haifa where he met ʻAbdu'l-Bahá again, and then back to Iran. After once again travelling to Haifa and returning to Iran, where he was severely beaten in a mob attack he met with the Shah of Iran Mozzafar al-Din Shah Qajar. His later travels included times in Yazd, Khorasan, his home town of Dúghábád, Ashgabat, Mashad, where he survived a murder attempt, Ashgabat, Egypt, Haifa, Mashad, and then Dúghábád. Here Mírzá Mahmúd was poisoned by one of his enemies, and died in AH 1346 (CE 1927-1928).
