= Nabíl-i-Aʻzam =

Iranian Baháʼí historian and poet (1831–1892)

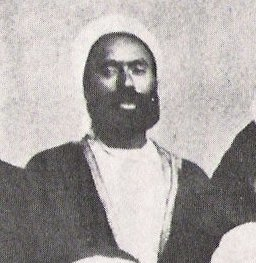
- Born: 29 July 1831; Zarand, Iran
- Died: 1892 (aged 60–61) ʻAkká, Ottoman Empire
- Occupations: Historian, poet
- Writing career
- Language: Persian
- Genres: Religious history, poetry
- Notable work: The Dawn-Breakers

Mullá Muḥammad-i-Zarandí (29 July 1831 – 1892), born Yár-Muḥammad and better known as Nabíl-i-Zarandí ("Nabíl of Zarand") or Nabíl-i-Aʻzam ("Nabíl the Great"), was an Iranian Baháʼí historian and poet, and one of the nineteen Apostles of Baháʼu'lláh. Baháʼu'lláh bestowed on him the title Nabíl, meaning "noble". He became a follower of the Báb in 1847 and later joined Baháʼu'lláh, undertaking numerous journeys to teach his religion and enduring imprisonment and other hardships.

Nabíl is best known for The Dawn-Breakers, a narrative of early Bábí and Baháʼí history. Portions of his manuscript were reviewed by Baháʼu'lláh and ʻAbdu'l-Bahá, and Shoghi Effendi later translated and edited its account of the Bábí period for publication in English. He also wrote devotional and mystical poetry, particularly in the mathnawi and ghazal forms. Baháʼu'lláh addressed several Tablets to him, including the Súriy-i-Damm and the two Súriy-i-Ḥajj Tablets, while ʻAbdu'l-Bahá included an account of his life in Memorials of the Faithful.

After Baháʼu'lláh's death in 1892, Nabíl remained loyal to his appointed successor, ʻAbdu'l-Bahá. Overwhelmed by grief at Baháʼu'lláh's death, he subsequently died by suicide by drowning himself in the sea near ʻAkká.

== Life ==
=== Early life and conversion ===
Nabíl was born in Zarand on 29 July 1831. He worked as a shepherd and received only an elementary education, but was eager to continue learning. He read and memorised passages from the Qurʼán and accompanied his father to Qom, where he became acquainted with Islamic religious teachings.

In 1847, while visiting his uncle in Rubát-Karím, he overheard a conversation about the Báb that aroused his interest. Siyyid Ḥusayn-i-Zaváriʼí subsequently introduced him to the Báb's writings, and discussions with Siyyid Ismáʻíl-i-Zaváriʼí deepened his understanding of the new religion.

Nabíl hoped to join the Bábís at Fort Tabarsi, but learned of their defeat before he could set out. In Tehran, he lived in a madrasa with Mullá ʻAbdu'l-Karím, a transcriber of the Báb's writings, and became acquainted with other Bábís, including Baháʼu'lláh. He copied and circulated the Báb's writings among people from different social backgrounds. He also frequented Baháʼu'lláh's house, a meeting place for Bábís and visiting believers, and later recorded many recollections of this period in his history.

=== Association with Baháʼu'lláh ===
In 1852, an attempt on the life of Náṣiri'd-Dín Sháh was followed by persecution of the Bábí community. During this period, Nabíl put forward a claim to its leadership, stating that he had received divine inspiration. He later withdrew his claim after meeting Baháʼu'lláh in Baghdad and recognising him as the fulfilment of the Báb's prophecies. According to Vahid Rafati, he became one of Baháʼu'lláh's followers in 1858.

Baháʼu'lláh gave him the title Nabíl and sent him on missions to various places. These journeys exposed him to imprisonment and other forms of persecution. He also accompanied Baháʼu'lláh and his family during part of their journey into exile. Although known as a poet among Persian-speaking Baháʼís, his reputation in the West rests chiefly on Shoghi Effendi's English translation of The Dawn-Breakers.

=== Travels and teaching ===
While living in Adrianople, Baháʼu'lláh sent Nabíl to Iran to inform the Bábí communities of his declaration as "Him whom God shall make manifest", the figure promised in the Bayán. Baháʼu'lláh dispatched him on numerous journeys from both Baghdad and Adrianople; in 1867–1868, a principal purpose of these missions was to acquaint the Bábís with this claim and invite them to accept it.

Baháʼu'lláh also instructed Nabíl to undertake pilgrimage to the house of the Báb in Shiraz and to his own house in Baghdad. He prescribed the rites for these pilgrimages in two Tablets known as the Súriy-i-Ḥajj, written during his residence in Adrianople. Pilgrimage to these houses was subsequently ordained in the Kitáb-i-Aqdas. Nabíl was the first person to perform the prescribed rites and is described in Baháʼí sources as the only person known to have completed both pilgrimages in accordance with the two Tablets.

In 1868, Baháʼu'lláh sent Nabíl to Egypt, where he was imprisoned. After his release, he travelled to ʻAkká, but followers of Mirza Yahya stationed near the city gate identified him, and the authorities expelled him. He travelled in the surrounding region, spending time on Mount Carmel and in Nazareth, before gaining entry to the city. On this occasion, he remained for 81 days, meeting Mírzá Áqá Ján and then Baháʼu'lláh. He was then sent back to Iran to encourage and strengthen the Baháʼí communities.

In 1888, Nabíl began writing his historical narrative in ʻAkká, drawing on information supplied by Mírzá Músá, Baháʼu'lláh's brother. The work took approximately a year and a half to complete. Parts of the manuscript were reviewed and approved by Baháʼu'lláh, while other portions were examined by ʻAbdu'l-Bahá.

=== Influence on Badíʻ ===
Among those influenced by Nabíl was Áqá Buzurg-i-Khurásání, later known as Badíʻ. As a young man, he had been rebellious, and his father had regarded him as resistant to instruction. After meeting Nabíl and hearing about the sufferings Baháʼu'lláh had endured, he became devoted to him. In 1869, he travelled through Mosul to ʻAkká to meet Baháʼu'lláh.

Baháʼí accounts describe Badíʻ as having undergone a profound transformation during two meetings with Baháʼu'lláh, who gave him the title Badíʻ and entrusted him with delivering the Lawḥ-i-Sulṭán, a letter addressed to Náṣiri'd-Dín Sháh. After returning to Iran and presenting the letter to the shah, Badíʻ was arrested, tortured and killed. Baháʼu'lláh called him the "Pride of Martyrs", and Shoghi Effendi later included him among the nineteen Apostles of Baháʼu'lláh.

== Writings ==
Nabíl wrote both poetry and prose. Much of his poetry concerns events in Bábí and Baháʼí history, and he circulated historical poems among the Baháʼís of Iran. His best-known historical poem, Mathnaví-yi-Nabíl-i-Zarandí, was published in Cairo in 1924 as a 65-page volume and reprinted in Langenhain, Germany, in 1995. It recounts major events from the beginnings of the Bábí movement to 1869.

Another mathnawi, comprising 666 verses, describes Baháʼu'lláh's exile from Adrianople to ʻAkká. His other historical poems include Mathnaví-yi-Viṣál va Hijr ("Reunion and Separation"), in 175 verses, and a 303-verse biography of Áqá Muḥammad-i-Qáʼiní, known as Nabíl-i-Akbar. Only a portion of his substantial body of poetry has been published.

His prose works include a treatise on the Bábí–Baháʼí calendar, a discussion of Baháʼí inheritance laws, and an account of Baháʼu'lláh's death. The latter was included on pages 67–108 of the 1995 Langenhain edition of Mathnaví-yi-Nabíl-i-Zarandí.

His most celebrated prose work is Maṭáliʻ al-Anvár, better known in English as The Dawn-Breakers, an extensive narrative of Bábí history written in ʻAkká in 1888–1890. Shoghi Effendi edited and translated the work into English, and it was first published in the United States in 1932. It is a major source for the history of the Báb's ministry. Baháʼís regard it as a principal and authoritative account of the early Bábí movement in Iran. Its translations into numerous languages have helped acquaint Baháʼís worldwide with the origins of their religion and the social and religious setting in which it emerged. The original Persian manuscript, preserved in the International Baháʼí Archives in Haifa, consists of 1,014 pages, with 22–24 lines per page.

Baháʼu'lláh addressed Nabíl by name in a Tablet later included as section CXXXIX of Gleanings from the Writings of Baháʼu'lláh, describing him as "numbered with My favored ones whose names the Finger of God hath inscribed".

== Death ==
Nabíl attended Baháʼu'lláh during his final illness and recorded the sorrow surrounding his last days. At ʻAbdu'l-Bahá's request, he compiled passages from Baháʼu'lláh's writings into a Tablet of Visitation, which Baháʼís recite when visiting the Shrine of the Báb and the Shrine of Baháʼu'lláh.

Although this task brought him some consolation, his grief persisted, and he drowned himself in the sea. According to ʻAbdu'l-Bahá's account, before his death Nabíl recorded its year in the word gharíq ("drowned"), whose numerical value in the abjad system is 1310, corresponding to the Islamic year in which he died.

Shoghi Effendi later designated Nabíl as one of the nineteen Apostles of Baháʼu'lláh, a title recognising the distinguished services of prominent early Baháʼís.

== See also ==
- Baháʼí Faith in Iran
- Apostles of Baháʼu'lláh

== Sources ==
- ʻAbdu'l-Bahá (1971). "Nabíl-i-Zarandí". Memorials of the Faithful. Translated by Gail, Marzieh. Wilmette, Illinois: Baháʼí Publishing Trust. pp. 32–36.
- Baháʼu'lláh (1990). "CXXXIX". Gleanings from the Writings of Baháʼu'lláh. Translated by Shoghi Effendi. Baháʼí Publishing Trust. pp. 302–305.
- Balyuzi, H. M. (1980). Baháʼu'lláh: The King of Glory. Oxford: George Ronald.
- Balyuzi, H. M. (1985). Eminent Baháʼís in the Time of Baháʼu'lláh. Oxford: George Ronald. pp. 268–270.
- Momen, Wendi, ed. (1989). A Basic Baháʼí Dictionary. Oxford: George Ronald.
- Nabíl-i-Aʻzam (1932). "The Seven Martyrs of Tihrán". The Dawn-Breakers: Nabíl's Narrative of the Early Days of the Baháʼí Revelation. Translated by Shoghi Effendi. Baháʼí Publishing Trust. pp. 434–441.
- Rafati, Vahid (29 June 2016). "Nabil-e Aʿẓam Zarandi, Mollā Moḥammad". Encyclopædia Iranica.
- Smith, Peter (2000). A Concise Encyclopedia of the Baháʼí Faith. Oxford: Oneworld Publications.
- Taherzadeh, Adib (1997). Nafaḥát-i-Ẓuhúr-i-Ḥaḍrat-i-Baháʼu'lláh [The Revelation of Baháʼu'lláh] (in Persian). Vol. 1. Translated by Forghani, Baher. Association for Baháʼí Studies in Persian. p. 221.
- Nuzdah Hizár Lughat [Nineteen Thousand Words] (in Persian). Vol. 2. p. 968.
- Zabihi-Moghaddam, Siyamak (2004). "The Babi-State Conflict in Mazandaran". In Sharon, Moshe (ed.). Studies in Modern Religions, Religious Movements and the Bābī-Bahā'ī Faiths. Numen Book Series: Studies in the History of Religions. Vol. 104. Leiden: Brill. pp. 217–218. ISBN 90-04-13904-4.
