= Hají Ákhúnd =

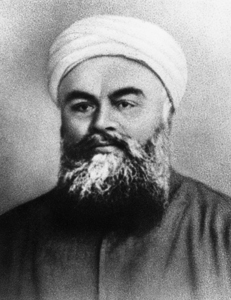
Hají Ák͟húnd.

Ḥájí Mullá ʻAlí-Akbar S͟hahmírzádí (Persian: حاج ملا على أكبر شهميرزادي 1842 – 1910), known as Ḥájí Ák͟húnd, was an eminent follower of Baháʼu'lláh, the founder of the Baháʼí Faith. He was appointed a Hand of the Cause, and identified as one of the nineteen Apostles of Baháʼu'lláh.

== Background ==
Hájí Ákhúnd was born in the village of S͟hahmírzád, Iran in 1842. He was the son of Mullá ‘Abbás who had become a Bábí in 1840's but lost interest in the new religion later on. Hájí Ákhúnd thus grew up in a household where there was some mention of this new religion.

Following some preliminary studies, he went to Mashhad to undertake further religious studies investigating Sufism and Shaykhism at the Madrasa Mirzá Jafar. In 1861, when he was 19 years old, he encountered Bábís and converted to the Báb's religion. Later on at some point after 1863 when he heard Bahá'u'lláh's claim to be the Manifestation of God as prophesied by the Báb, he became a Bahá'i. This was the reason for his expulsion from his madrasih in Mashhad and his subsequent return to Shahmirzád in 1863 where he was an active teacher of his newfound Faith.

Over the years his parents as well as his two brothers and four sisters accepted the new religion. Due to opposition to his teaching work in Shahmirzád he was forced to leave his wife and child and go to Tehran in 1868,where he studied for a while at the two madrasihs of Hakim Háshem and Mu'ayyer ul-Mamálik, and continued to teach his new Faith.

He married Fátimih Bagum in 1872 and they had two daughters, Munirih who married Ibn-i-‘Abhar and Forughiyyih who married Diyáu'd-Din Munádi. They also had a son who moved to France and married there establishing his family under the name Ekber.

== Imprisonment ==
‘Ali Akbar was arrested a number of times in Tehran throughout the 1870's and 1880's. Altogether he spent about seven years in Iranian jails. As he was well-known as a Bahá'i, whenever he heard of opposition to the Faith stirring up in Tehran, he would dress in a cloak and sit waiting for the guards to come and arrest him.

He was imprisoned on the orders of Mullá ʻAli Kani in 1868. Later in 1872, three days after his wedding, he was arrested and imprisoned on the order of Náyibu's-Saltanih Kámrán Mirzá for seven months. During this imprisonment he was tortured in order to pressure him to identify other Bahá’ís in Tehran. Despite the torture he refused to cooperate and did not give any information to his interrogators.

During his imprisonment in Tehran in 1882, the Sháh decided that he would like to meet ‘Ali Akbar; yet, since he was awe-inspired to visit him face-to-face, he decided to see him from behind a window. The Sháh was so impressed by the prisoner's dignity and bearing while seated in chains and stocks in the prison, that he ordered his photographer to take a picture of Háji Ákhund.

He was also arrested along with many other Tehran Baha'is in 1883, for two years, again on the order of Náyibu's-Saltanih. This was followed by a brief period of further imprisonment in 1887. Finally, he was arrested and imprisoned for another two years from 1891 to 1893 along with Hájí Amín in Tehrán and Qazvin.

== Travels ==
He visited ʻAkká, where Baháʼu'lláh and his family were prisoners, on four occasions. During his trip in 1870(1287 Lunar Hijri) his first wife died, so that after returning to Tehran he married Fátimih Bagum a descendent of one of the kings of Safavid dynasty. He later visited ′Akká in about 1874, as well as in about 1887(1305 Lunar Hijri), and finally in late 1894.

He was given the task of transferring the remains of the Báb from various secret locations to ʻAkká, where they remained for several years until they were eventually entombed in the Shrine of the Báb. He was one of the four Hands of the Cause appointed by Baháʼu'lláh himself in 1880's, and was responsible for much of the Baháʼí activity in Iran until his death, in Tehran, on 4 March, 1910.
