= Badíʻ =

Prominent Baháʼí, bearer of a letter by Baháʼu'lláh to the Shah

- ﺑﺪﻳﻊ
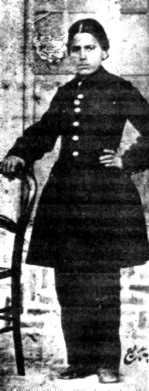
- Badíʻ at age 15
- Born: Mírzá Áqá Buzurg-i-Nís͟hábúrí Persian: میرزا آقا بزرگ نیشاپوری; 1852
- Died: 1869 (aged 16–17); Ṭihrán
- Cause of death: Torture
- Title: Badíʻ
- Father: Haji ʻAbdu'l-Majíd-i-Nís͟hábúrí, A.K.A. Haji 'Abdu'l-Majid-i-Shalfurush (dealer in shawls), A.K.A. Aba Badi' (Father of Badi')

Badíʻ (1852 – 1869) was an eminent early follower of Baháʼu'lláh, founder of the Baháʼí Faith, and considered one of his chief apostles. At the age of 17 he delivered a letter from Baháʼu'lláh to Náṣiri'd-Dín S͟háh, for which he was tortured and killed.

== Background ==
Badíʻ was from Nís͟hábúr, in the province of Khurásán. His given name was Buzurg, and the title Badíʻ' (Arabic: ﺑﺪﻳﻊ meaning "wonderful") was given to him by Baháʼu'lláh after his martyrdom. His name sometimes appears as Mírzá or Áqá Buzurg-i-Nís͟hábúrí (or Nís͟hápúrí) or Khurásání.

Although his father, Haji ʻAbdu'l-Majíd, was a Baháʼí, at first Badíʻ was not drawn to the new religion. He was an unruly and rebellious youth, and for this reason, his father had originally described him as the "despair of the family".

Haji ʻAbdu'l-Majíd was later addressed by Baháʼu'lláh as Aba Badíʻ ("Father of Badíʻ"). Haji ʻAbdu'l-Majíd was a dealer in shawls and a noted merchant who had survived the Battle of Fort Tabarsi (1848 -1849). In 1877, at age 85, Badíʻs father was executed at a public square in Mashhad because he repeatedly refused to recant his faith.

== Travels ==
It was upon a meeting with Nabíl-i-Aʻzam that Badíʻ heard a poem by Baháʼu'lláh and began weeping. After finishing his studies, he gave away his possessions and set out on foot for Bag͟hdád, where a significant number of Baháʼís were under persecution. Finally he set out on foot from Múṣul through Bag͟hdád to the prison city of ʻAkká.

As guards protected against Baháʼís entering ʻAkka, Badíʻ dressed as a water-carrier and slipped by the guards, and then proceeded to a mosque, where he recognized ʻAbdu'l-Bahá and gave him a note. Badíʻ received two interviews with Baháʼu'lláh, who requested that he deliver the Lawh-i-Sulṭán, Baháʼu'lláh's tablet to Náṣiri'd-Dín S͟háh. Badíʻ received the tablet in Haifa to avoid being caught by Ottoman officials. From there he travelled for four months on foot to Ṭihrán. Along the way he was reported to "be full of joy, laughter, gratitude and forbearance, walking around one hundred paces then leaving the road and turning to face ʻAkká. He would then prostrate himself and say: 'O God, that which you have bestowed upon me through Your bounty, do not take back through Your justice; rather grant me strength to safeguard it'".

== Execution ==
After three days of fasting, Badíʻ went to the Shah's summer camp, and the Shah came upon him while hunting in the woods. Badíʻ approached the monarch with respect and calmly said: "O King! I have come to thee from Sheba with a weighty message". Badíʻ was arrested, branded for three successive days, his head beaten to a pulp with the butt of a rifle, after which his body was thrown into a pit and earth and stones heaped upon it.
