= Ibn-i-Abhar =

Ḥájí Mírzá Muḥammad-Taqí (died 1917), known as Ibn-i-Abhar (Arabic: ابن أبهر), was an eminent follower of Baháʼu'lláh, the founder of the Baháʼí Faith. He was appointed a Hand of the Cause and identified as one of the nineteen Apostles of Baháʼu'lláh.

== Background ==
Ibn-i-Abhar was born in the village of Abhar. His father came from a family of the leading Islamic clergy of the village, and became a Bábí after reading some of the writings of the Báb. Due to the persecution which followed, the family moved to Qazvin, and in 1868 became followers of Baháʼu'lláh, who claimed to be the messianic figure of which the Báb had foretold.

== Travels ==
In 1874, his father was poisoned. He began travelling to different parts of Iran, where he taught many in the Bábí community who accepted Baháʼu'lláh. His teaching, however, led to a fourteen-month imprisonment. After his release, he continued travelling throughout Iran, and in 1886 made a trip to ʻAkká. That same year he became one of the four Hands of the Cause appointed by Baháʼu'lláh, and began travel-teaching outside of Iran, to Caucasia, Turkmenistan, and India.

From 1890 to 1894, he was imprisoned in a dungeon in Tihrán, wearing the same chains that once were used on Baháʼu'lláh while a prisoner there.

After his release in 1894, he again travelled to ʻAkká, and then to ʻIshqábád. In 1897 he participated in the gathering which led to the formation of the Central Spiritual Assembly of Tihrán, which later became the National Spiritual Assembly of Iran.

In 1907, he travelled across India with Mírzá Mahmúd-i-Zarqání and two American Baháʼís, Harlan Ober and Hooper Harris.

Throughout his life he was able to visit the Holy Land eleven times. He also travelled extensively inside Iran. He died in 1917.
