= Alexander Tumansky =

Major General of the Imperial Russian Army

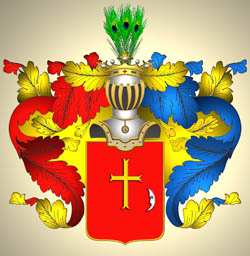
Coat of arms of the Russian nobility Tumansky

Tumanskiy, Aleksandr Grigorevich (Russian: Туманский, Александр Григорьевич) (1861–1920) was an orientalist, military interpreter, and Major General of the Imperial Russian Army, belonging to an ancient Ukrainian aristocratic family.

== Biography ==
Aleksandr Grigorevich Tumanskiy (Toumansky) (Tumansky) was born on 23 September 1861. From 1888 to 1891 Tumansky, then an officer in the Imperial Russian Army, received his Oriental education at the Officers' Courses of Oriental Languages organized by the Russian Ministry of Foreign Affairs. He studied Arabic, Turkish and Persian; in all he spoke eleven languages.

From 1891 to 1895 Tumansky was stationed in Central Asia. In 1894 he was responsible for establishing communications with Persia. Between 1900 and 1905 he served as the Russian vice consul in Van, Turkey. From 1908 to 1909 he was ordered to Persia again to resume his diplomatic duties. In 1911 he was appointed the head of the officers' Oriental language preparatory school in Tiflis (Tbilisi), which functioned under the Headquarters of the Caucasian Military Command.

In March 1917, Tumansky retired from the military service with the rank of Major-General. He left Russia after the October Revolution in 1917 and died in Constantinople (Istanbul) on 1 December 1920.

== Scientific activity ==
Tumansky is one of the first Russian-language scholars to investigate Bábism in Persia in the middle of the 19th century and the first followers of the Baháʼí Faith in the East. He befriended the Baháʼís in Ashgabat where Mirza Abu'l-Faḍl wrote for him the Risáliy-i Iskandaríyyh, a summary of the life of the founder of the Baháʼí Faith. In 1899 he discovered the Kitáb-i-Aqdas by Baháʼu'lláh and translated it into Russian. Now the Kitáb-i-Aqdas is generally known, but in that time it was an epochal discovery. During his research of the Bábí movement Tumansky corresponded with E.G. Browne through Baron Victor Romanovich Rosen.

Another of his discoveries was a lost work of Ulugh-Beg, an ancient manuscript entitled "Olus-e-Arbaʻa", part of which, "Hudud ul-ʻalam", was published in 1930 and in 1937.

Being a military man, he wrote a book entitled Military Art of the Ancient Arabs in 1897.

== Opinions and memories about A.G. Tumansky ==
Russian Orientalist I. U. Krachkovskiy (1883–1951) wrote that Tumansky was one of the rare orientalists by his calling but not by his profession.

== Bibliography ==
1. Russian State Archive of Literature and Art, case 777, dos'e 87, sheets 7, 8
2. Full service record of Colonel A.G. Tumansky in March 1917, Russian State Military-Historical Archive, fond 409, opis' 1, case 148-610 (1917 year)
3. И.Ю. Крачковский, "А.Г. Туманский" [некролог], 'Новый Восток', блокнот 1, Москва и Петроград, 1922, стр. 112.
4. 'Худуд аль-алам': рукописи Туманского, введение и содержание В.В. Бартольда, Ленинград, 1930 (факсимиле. издание).
5. Hudüd al-ʻĀlam: 'The Regions of the World', A Persian Geography 372 A.H. — 982 A.D., ed. and tr. V.Minorsky, London, 1937.
6. Н.А. Кузнецова К истории изучения Бабизма и Бахаизма в России, Иранский сборник 6, Москва, 1963 г., стр. 90–91
7. Hudüd al-ʻĀlam: 'The Regions of the World', A Persian Geography 372 A.H. — 982 A.D., 2nd ed. pref. V.V.Barthold, ed. C.E. Bosworth, London, 1970.
8. Идем (Рай), Иран в период революции XIX века, 1983 г., стр. 199–231.
9. Дж. Дорри, "Proceedings of a Seminar on Nabil-i-Aʻzam-i-Zarandi" Wienacht, Switzerland, 1996, pp. 125–50.
10. Абу'ль-хази Бахадор Хан, Родословная Туркмен (Генеалогическое древо туркменского народа), перевод А.Г. Туманского, Ашхабад, 1897 г.
11. М.К. Басханов, "Русские военные востоковеды до 1917 года: библиографический словарь", Москва, 2005, стр. 242–243.

== See also ==
- Arabic Bayán
- Azalism
- Báb
- Bábism
- Baháʼí Faith
- Persian Bayán
