= Dimitri Ivanovich Dolgorukov =

Russian diplomat

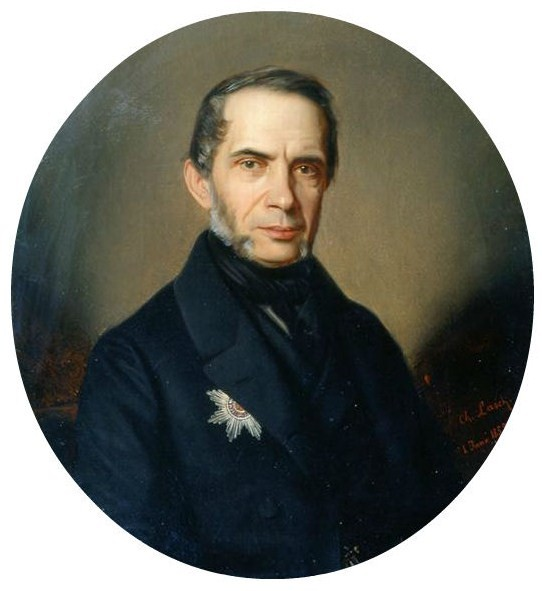
Dimitri Ivanovich Dolgorukov by Carl Johann Lasch, 1855

Prince Dimitri Ivanovich Dolgorukov (Russian: Князь Димитрий Иванович Долгоруков; 1797–1867) was a Russian career diplomat born into one of the most prominent families in Russia.

He held several diplomatic posts, first in Constantinople, Ottoman Empire, and then in the Russian Embassy in Madrid, Spain (1826–1830). In the late 1820s, he travelled with American diplomat and writer Washington Irving from Seville to Granada and stayed at the Alhambra with Irving between May and June 1827. He also held diplomatic posts from 1832 to 1837 in the Hague, from 1838 to 1842 in Naples and in 1842-1845 again in Constantinople.

He was also the Russian Minister in Iran from 1845 to 1854. Dolgorukov retired from the diplomatic service in 1854 and died in 1867.
