= Nabíl-i-Akbar =

Áqá Muḥammad-i-Qá'iní (1829-1892), also known as Fadil-i-Qa'ini ("Learned One of Qa'ín") and surnamed Nabíl-i-Akbar (Arabic: نبيل الأكبر) was a distinguished Baháʼí from the town of Qá'in. He is one of 19 Apostles of Baháʼu'lláh, and referred to by ʻAbdu'l-Bahá as a Hand of the Cause of God.

In the abjad notation, the name "Muhammad" has the same numerical value as "Nabíl". ّ The word "Nabil" also means 'noble', and Akbar means 'great' in Arabic.

Nabíl-i-Akbar was the recipient of the Tablet of Wisdom from Baháʼu'lláh.

ʻAbdu'l-Bahá recounted that Aqa Muhammad-i-Qa'ini, later titled Nabil-i-Akbar, was a distinguished disciple of the renowned Mujtahid Shaykh Murtada Ansari in Najaf. Nabil was uniquely gifted and achieved the rare honor of being made a mujtahid by Shaykh Murtada, who seldom conferred that title. Nabil-i-Akbar excelled not only in theology but also in the humanities, philosophy, mysticism, and Shaykhi teachings, making him a true polymath. Upon recognizing the divine truth, he was spiritually transformed, becoming passionately devoted and ablaze with divine love.

== Early life and education ==
Naw Ferest is a village in the district of Qa'in, near Birjand, where Aqa Muhammad was born to a family of ulama on 29 March 1829. His father, Mulla Ahmad, was a well-known, influential, and popular cleric. He raised his son in traditional Islamic religious studies. Then he studied under various distinguished divines, becoming interested in philosophy, which took him to Sabzavar. Aqa Muhammad studied the philosophy of illuminationism for five years under Hiji Mulla Hadi Sabzavari, the most renowned philosopher of the nineteenth century in Persia. Thereafter, to complete his education, Nabil took the road from Savsavar to Najaf and Karbila in 1852. When he arrived in Tehran, it was at the height of the persecution of the followers of the Bab. At the instigation of an ill-wisher that was exposed later, he was arrested as a Babi, which he denied, and was freed. However, this incident aroused his curiosity about the Babi movement, and while in Tehran, he came into contact with the writings of the Bab through meeting Siyyid Ya'qub, one of the Bab's followers. Upon studying the writings of the Bab, he became a believer in the Babi Faith.

=== In Iraq ===
In Najaf, he studied Islamic jurisprudence with well-known Mujtahids of the 'Oṣuli School of Islam, especially Shaykh Murtaza Ansari. This eminent mujtahid was the same Shaykh who refused to associate himself with the Shi'i divines gathered to make plans against Baha'u'llah during his time in Baghdad.

After six years with Shaykh Mortaza Ansari, his impressive dissertation earned him the license for Ijtihad from Ansari. Nabil's mastery of both the illuminationism philosophy and Islamic jurisprudence made him a notable scholar of the religion. With the completion of his studies, Nabil moved from Najaf to Baghdad in 1859, before heading back to Iran. Shaykh Mortaza Ansari was the same Shaykh who refused to associate himself with the Shiʻi divines gathered together to concert plans against Baháʼu'lláh during his time in Baghdad.

==== Baghdad ====
On his way back to Iran, Nabil stayed for a while in Baghdad. A Shaykh Hasan-i-Rashti, one of the Babis, invited him to visit Baha’u’llah, who lived in that city. Nabil-i-Akbar was a guest of Baha’u’llah for a while in Baghdad and is one of the few who recognized Baha’u’llah’s station before he announced his mission in 1863. At the instruction of Baha’u’llah, Nabil proceeded to his hometown in Iran to promote the teachings of the Bab.

== In Iran ==
Returning to his hometown of Qa’in, he was received with respect and caught the attention of the ruler of Qa’in, Hishmat’ul-Mulk (Amir Alam Khan), which attracted the ulama’s jealousy toward Nabil. The cleric coordinated a discussion between Mulla Ibrahim and Nabil-i-Akbar, where everyone present testified to Nabil’s elevated knowledge, causing an invitation for him to preach from the pulpit at the mosques. He accepted the invitation; however, he also taught the teachings of the Bab privately. This aroused the anger of the ulama, and Nabil ended up in prison and suffered torture in Birjand for two months. Then, after two years under house arrest, Nabil was exiled to Mashhad.

=== Accepting Baha'u'llah's claim ===
Nabil-i-Akbar was in Mashhad when he heard, through Mulla Muhamad Ali Zarandi (Nabil-i-A’zam), of Baha’u’llah’s public declaration in Baghdad in 1863. It was then that he wrote to the followers of the Bab in the region, inviting them to accept Baha’u’llah’s claim as fulfillment of the promise of the Bab in his book of Persian Bayan. This act upset the ulama of Mashhad, causing Nabil to be exiled to Tehran by the Shah's order in 1970. Although he was stripped of his symbols of Islamic authority (turban and aba/cloak), he continued to promote the teachings of Baha’u’llah among the masses.

In 1874, he decided to visit Baha’u’llah in Akká. He took the road from Tehran to Qazvin and, after a short stay there, traveled to Akko, where he received the title of Nabil-i-Akbar and the Tablet of Wisdom from Baha’u’llah.

=== Activities in Iran and beyond ===
Upon returning to Iran, despite threats on his life, Nabil-i-Akbar continued to promote the teachings of the Baha’i Faith in different cities and towns such as Tehran, Tabriz, Isfahan, Shiraz, Yazd, Kerman, Mashhad, Zanjan, and Qazvin. In these cities, personalities such as Mirza Hasan Adib joined the Baha’i Movement. Following the heightened opposition in Iran, he took the road to Ishqabad with his nephew, Sheikh Muhammad Ali, in 1890. On the way, he was arrested in Sabzavar. However, recognizing his dignified personality, the town’s mayor arranged for Nabil’s escape. He resided in Ishqabad and played a significant role in developing the Baha’i community. In 1890-1891, he accompanied Mirza Abu’l-Faḍl Golpayegani to establish Baha’i communities in Bokhara and Samarqand. Nabil-i-Akbar died in Bokhara in 1892 and was buried there. ‘Abdu’l--Baha, Baha’u’llah’s son and the leader of the Baha’i Faith since 1892, wrote a special prayer recited at the time of entering a shrine for Nabil and instructed the local Baha’is of Ishqabad to send a delegation of nine Baha’is on his behalf to Bokhara to visit Nabil’s grave and recite this special text (ziyartnameh). Twenty years later, Shaikh Moḥammad-ʿAli, Nabil’s nephew, upon the instruction of ‘Abdu’l-Baha, transferred his remains to the Baha’i cemetery in Ishqabad. Abdu’l-Baha also instructed Moḥammad-ʿAli Zarandi (Nabil-i-A'zam)to compose a versified biography of Nabil-i-Akbar, which he did in the form of a maṯhnawi.

== His legacy ==
Nabil was a man "of wide learning, at once a mujtahid, a philosopher, a mystic, and gifted with intuitive sight, he was also an accomplished man of letters and a speaker without a peer." In recognition of his contributions to the development of the Baha’i communities, he was posthumously given the title of Hand of the Cause of God, an honorific title given to eight Baha’is during the lifetime of Baha’u’llah, and referred to as one of the nineteen “Apostles of Baha’u’llah” by Shoghi Effendi.

ʻAbdu'l-Bahá recounted:

There was, in the city of Najaf, among the disciples of the widely known mujtahid, Shaykh Murtada, a man without likeness or peer. His name was Aqa Muhammad-i-Qa'ini, and later on he would receive, from the Manifestation, the title of Nabil-i-Akbar. This eminent soul became the leading member of the mujtahid's company of disciples. Singled out from among them all, he alone was given the rank of mujtahid -- for the late Shaykh Murtada was never wont to confer this degree. He excelled not only theology but in other branches of knowledge, such as the humanities, the philosophy of the Illumination, the teachings of the mystics and of the Shaykhi School. He was a universal man, in himself alone a convincing proof. When his eyes were opened to the light of Divine guidance, and he breathed in the fragrances of Heaven, he became a flame of God. Then his heart leapt within him, and in an ecstasy of joy and love, he roared out like leviathan in the deep.

It has been claimed that "no one within the enclave of the Baháʼí Faith has ever surpassed the profundity of his erudition". As far as the accomplishment demanded of a Shiʻih mujtahid is concerned, his attainment was superb, but naturally he had little knowledge of the lore and the scholarship of the West. Mírzá Abu'l-Faḍl of Gulpáygán, on the other hand, was well versed in Islamic studies and had a wide and comprehensive knowledge of Western thought as well.

=== Works ===
- His major work is his dissertation (Resaleh, 1858), a versified treatise in Arabic covering the fundamental verities of Islam, for which he received the license from Shaikh Mortaza Ansari to practice ijtihad. Copies exist in private collections.
- Qaṣida-i-Ta’iyyeh is a poem in 445 verses in Arabic, an imitation of the classic mystical style of Ibn al-Farez. It is a description of Nabil’s mystical search for truth and his eventual belief in Baha’u’llah. It was composed in Iraq in 1859.
- A 65-verse incomplete qaṣida, in Arabic, discussing Islamic eschatology, in particular the Baha’i proofs for the causes of Bāb and Baha’u’llah
- a versified letter of 31 couplets in Persian addressed to ʿAli-Moḥammad Varqā, and
- A collection of mostly apologetic letters, in Persian and Arabic, to government officials, religious leaders, and friends.

Also, following Baha’u’llah’s request, Nabil-i-Akbar edited the history of Badi’-i-Bayani of Mirza Huseyn Hamadani (1883–84). It is thought that Nabil wrote the latter part of this book, dealing with the Babi movement, because of its similarity with his writing style; a copy can be found in the International Baha’i Archives in Haifa. Nabil’s unpublished manuscripts and an apologetic in Persian, Tohfeh-i-Naseriyeh, are in private collections.

It is said that no one in the Baháʼí Faith surpassed his scholarly depth. While he excelled in the standards of a Shiʻih mujtahid, he lacked knowledge of Western thought. In contrast, Mírzá Abu'l-Faḍl was well-versed in both Islamic and Western scholarship.
