= Apostles of Baháʼu'lláh =

Type of apostles

The Apostles of Baháʼu'lláh were nineteen prominent followers of Baháʼu'lláh, the founder of the Baháʼí Faith. The apostles were designated as such by Shoghi Effendi, head of the religion in the earlier half of the 20th century, and the list was included in The Baháʼí World, Vol. III (pp. 80–81).

These individuals played a vital role in the development of the Baháʼí Faith, consolidating its adherents and bringing its teachings around the world. To Baháʼís, they filled a similar role as the sons of Jacob, the apostles of Jesus, Muhammad's companions, or the Báb's Letters of the Living.

== List of Apostles ==
Many of the stories of the Apostles are well known to Baháʼís. The names of the apostles were:

1. Mírzá Músá - a.k.a. Kalím, the brother of Baháʼu'lláh
2. Badíʻ - a.k.a. Mirza Buzurg, the 17-year-old who delivered Baháʼu'lláh's tablet to Nassiru'd-Din Shah and was subsequently killed.
3. Siyyid Hasan - the 'King of Martyrs' of Isfahan who was beheaded with his brother.
4. Hájí Amín - a.k.a. Mulla Abdu'l-Hasan, the trustee of Huqúqu'lláh.
5. Mírzá Abu'l-Faḍl - The scholar who travelled as far as America and wrote several notable books about the Baháʼí Faith.
6. Varqá - a.k.a. Mírzá ʻAlí Muhammad, the father of Rúhu'lláh. The two were killed at the same time for their adherence.
7. Mírzá Mahmúd - a.k.a. Maḥmúd-i-Furúg͟hí, he was a well known teacher of the Baháʼí Faith, often dedicating himself to the welfare of the youth.
8. Hají Ákhúnd - a.k.a. Mullá ʻAlí-Akbar S͟hahmírzádí, he was given the task of transferring the remains of the Báb from various secret locations to ʻAkká. He was responsible for much of the Baháʼí activity in Iran until his death.
9. Nabíl-i-Akbar - a.k.a. Aqa Muhammad Qa'ini, teacher, and recipient of several tablets from Baháʼu'lláh.
10. Vakílu'd-Dawlih - a.k.a. Ḥájí Mírzá Muḥammad-Taqí, a cousin of the Báb and the chief builder of the first Baháʼí House of Worship in Ishqábád which was initiated by ʻAbdu'l-Bahá in or about 1902.
11. Ibn-i-Abhar - a.k.a. Ḥájí Mírzá Muḥammad-Taqí, he traveled and taught about the religion in countries and regions of Iran, Caucasus, Turkmenistan and India.
12. Nabíl-i-Aʻzam - a.k.a. Mulla Muhammad, the author of the historical narrative The Dawn-breakers.
13. Kázim-i-Samandar - a.k.a. Shaykh Kázim, the favourite Apostle of Baháʼu'lláh. He travelled teaching the religion in Persia, the Lawh-i-Fu'ád is addressed to him.
14. Muhammad Mustafá Baghdádí - Served the Baha'is travelling to Akká while living in Beirut on instructions of Baháʼu'lláh. He also met some of the Bab's Letters of the Living.
15. Mishkín-Qalam - a.k.a. Mirza Husayn, noteworthy calligrapher of his time and designer of the Greatest Name.
16. Adíb - a.k.a. Mirza Hasan, after the passing of Baháʼu'lláh, he became instrumental in dealing with the activities of Covenant-breakers in Iran. Chairman of the first National Spiritual Assembly of Iran. He travelled to India and Burma to help spread the Baháʼí Faith in those areas.
17. Shaykh Muhammad-'Alí - Nephew of Nabíl-i-Akbar. Traveled to India and later Haifa and taught about the Baháʼí Faith. He was later sent to Ishqábád by Abdu'l-Bahá to take care of the education of children there. Along with other followers he helped in completing the unfinished writings of Mírzá Abu'l-Faḍl.
18. Zaynu'l-Muqarrabín - a.k.a. Mullá Zaynul-ʻÁbidín, doctor of Islamic law. He submitted questions to Baháʼu'lláh regarding the Kitáb-i-Aqdas, the Baháʼí book of laws, which have been published in an appendix to the book.
19. Ibn-i-Asdaq - a.k.a. Mírzá ʻAlí-Muḥammad-i-K͟hurásání, was addressed by Baháʼu'lláh as Shahíd Ibn-i-Shahíd (Martyr, son of the Martyr). He was the son of Mullá Sádiq, a martyr of the Bábí movement. Along with Ahmad Yazdani, brought the Tablet to The Hague from ʻAbdu'l-Bahá to the Central Organisation for Durable Peace in The Hague.

== Tablets of the Divine Plan ==
ʻAbdu'l-Bahá addresses the Baháʼís of the United States and Canada in the Tablets of the Divine Plan with the phrase: "O ye Apostles of Baháʼu'lláh!" He goes on to encourage them to "strive ye with heart and soul so that ye may reach this lofty and exalted position".

He outlines certain conditions for this attainment, namely firmness in the Covenant of God, fellowship and love amongst the believers, and continually travelling to all parts of the continent, "nay, rather, to all parts of the world".

Shoghi Effendi referred to Martha Root as "that unique and great-hearted apostle of Baháʼu'lláh", but she is not considered one of the nineteen Apostles designated as such by Shoghi Effendi. (Baha'i Administration, p. 112)

== See also ==
- Disciples of ʻAbdu'l-Bahá
- Hands of the Cause
