= Summons of the Lord of Hosts =

Collection of texts of Baháʼu'lláh

The Summons of the Lord of Hosts.

The Summons of the Lord of Hosts is a collection of the tablets of Baháʼu'lláh, founder of the Baháʼí Faith, that were written to the kings and rulers of the world during his exile in Adrianople and in the early years of his exile to the fortress town of Acre (now in Israel) in 1868. Baháʼu'lláh claimed to be the Promised One of all religions and all ages and summoned the leaders of East and West to recognize him as the promised one. The Summons of the Lord of Hosts is the printing of five distinct tablets of this material.

== Súriy-i-Haykal (Tablet of the Temple) ==
See online text here

The Súriy-i-Haykal (Persian: سورةى هيكل) or Tablet of the Temple, is a composite work which consists of a tablet followed by five messages addressed to Pope Pius IX, Napoleon III, Tsar Alexander II of Russia, Queen Victoria, and Naser al-Din Shah Qajar. The messages were written while Baháʼu'lláh was in Adrianople, and shortly after its completion, Baháʼu'lláh instructed the Surih and the tablets to the kings be written in the form of a Haykal (temple), a five-pointed star, and added to it the conclusion:

Thus have We built the Temple with the hands of power and might, could ye but know it. This is the Temple promised unto you in the Book. Draw ye nigh unto it. This is that which profiteth you, could ye but comprehend it. Be fair, O peoples of the earth! Which is preferable, this, or a temple which is built of clay? Set your faces towards it. Thus have ye been commanded by God, the Help in Peril, the Self-Subsisting.

Shoghi Effendi, who described the tablet as one of Baháʼu'lláh's most challenging works, writes about the Súriy-i Haykal, "words which reveal the importance He attached to those Messages, and indicate their direct association with the prophecies of the Old Testament", referring to the prophecy where Zechariah had promised the rebuilding of the Temple in the End of Times. In the Book of Zechariah it is recorded:

And speak unto him, saying, Thus speaketh the LORD of hosts, saying, Behold the man whose name is The BRANCH; and he shall grow up out of his place, and he shall build the temple of the LORD: Even he shall build the temple of the LORD; and he shall bear the glory, and shall sit and rule upon his throne; and he shall be a priest upon his throne: and the counsel of peace shall be between them both.

— Zechariah 6:12-13

Shoghi Effendi, in The Promised Day is Come (pp. 47–8), refers to this rebuilding of the temple as fulfilled in the return of the Manifestation of God in a human temple. Throughout the tablet, Baháʼu'lláh addresses the Haykal ("the Temple") and explains the glory which is invested in it. Baháʼu'lláh, in response to a question, has stated that the Haykal is the person of Baháʼu'lláh. Adib Taherzadeh has written that "[i]t is fascinating to know that the One Who speaks with the voice of God in this Tablet is identical with the One spoken to."

Regarding the Haykal, Baháʼu'lláh writes that it refers to the human or physical temple of the Manifestation of God (prophets of God). He states that the Manifestation of God is a pure mirror that reflects the sovereignty of God and manifests God's beauty and grandeur to mankind. In essence Baháʼu'lláh explains that the Manifestation of God is a "Living Temple" and every time that Baháʼu'lláh addresses the Haykal he shows a new facet of God's revelation.

The Haykal, which represents the Manifestation of God who spreads the Word of God in the form of a human temple, has members each of whom symbolize one of the signs and attributes of God. To the eyes of the Haykal he asks it to not look at the world of creation, but instead to focus on the beauty of God. To the Haykal's ears Baháʼu'lláh asks it to become deaf to the voices of the ungodly and to listen to the Word of God. To the tongue of the Haykal Baháʼu'lláh states that it has been created to mention the name of God. To the hands of the Haykal Baháʼu'lláh asks them to stretch out upon all humankind and hold within their grasp the reins of God. Finally, Baháʼu'lláh states that from the heart of the Haykal knowledge will emerge and raise scientists who will bring about technological achievements.

Another symbol used by Baháʼu'lláh in describing the Haykal is through the four letters (H, Y, K, and L) that compose the word in Arabic. Baháʼu'lláh in the tablet explains the spiritual significance of each letter: H is for Huwiyyah (Essence of Divinity), Y is for Qadír (Almighty), K is for Karím (All Bountiful), and L is for Fadl (Grace).

Regarding the five other messages to the rulers that form the pentacle of the Súriy-i-Haykal, Baháʼu'lláh tells them he is the Manifestation of God for this day, and that they should accept his message. The message to Naser al-Din Shah Qajar, which is the longest message, was delivered to the Shah by Badíʻ, a youth who was killed by the Shah shortly thereafter.

== Súriy-i-Ra'ís "Tablet of the Chief" ==
Muhammad Ismaʻil Kashani, a follower of Baháʼu'lláh, in whose honour the Súriy-i Ra'ís was written.

See online text here

The Súriy-i-Ra'ís (Persian: سورةى رئيس, Suriy-e Ra'is), or "Tablet of the Chief", which addresses Mehmed Emin Âli Pasha, the Ottoman Prime Minister, was written in August 1868, when Baháʼu'lláh and the other Baháʼís were being exiled from Adrianople to Gallipoli to their final destination of the prison city of Acre. The Súriy-i Ra'ís, written in Arabic, was revealed in honour of Muhammad Ismaʻil Kashani, a faithful believer of Baháʼu'lláh. In the tablet, Baháʼu'lláh writes about Âli Pasha's claimed abuse of civil power.

In the tablet, Baháʼu'lláh tells Âli Pasha, whom he calls chief, to listen to the voice of God, and that no power on earth can prevent him from proclaiming God's message and from achieving his purpose. Baháʼu'lláh further accuses Âli Pasha of conspiring with the Qajar Empire's ambassador to harm him, and forecasts that because of this injustice he will find himself with a "manifest loss." Furthermore, Baháʼu'lláh compares Âli Pasha with those who rose up against previous prophets, such as Nimrod against Abraham, Pharaoh against Moses, and the Sasanian emperor against Muhammad.

Regarding Âli Pasha's superior, Sultan Abdülaziz, Baháʼu'lláh prophesies that the Sultan will no longer control Adrinople:

Land of Mystery (Adrianople) and what is beside it ... shall pass out of the hands of the King, and commotions shall appear, and the voice of lamentation shall be raised, and the evidences of mischief shall be revealed on all sides.

Another topic discussed in the tablet is that Baháʼu'lláh glorifies his own revelation, and prophesies that it will encompass the entire earth. Regarding his revelation, he wrote:

Had Muhammad, the Apostle of God, attained this Day, He would have exclaimed: 'I have truly recognized Thee, O Thou the Desire of the Divine Messengers!' Had Abraham attained it, He too, falling prostrate upon the ground, and in the utmost lowliness before the Lord thy God, would have cried: 'Mine heart is filled with peace, O Thou Lord of all that is in heaven and on earth! I testify that Thou hast unveiled before mine eyes all the glory of Thy power and the full majesty of Thy law!'... Had Moses Himself attained it, He, likewise, would have raised His voice saying: 'All praise be to Thee for having lifted upon me the light of Thy countenance and enrolled me among them that have been privileged to behold Thy face!

Baháʼu'lláh also describes the nature of the soul. He explains that if the soul acquires spiritual qualities in this world it will move towards God. After physical death it will separate from the body and live in the worlds of God, but if the soul does not acquire spiritual attributes it will be far from God.

Concerning the significance of the Súriy-i Ra'ís, Baháʼu'lláh, in a later tablet, wrote that from the moment it was written, the world has been in constant tribulation and that an immense cataclysmic process has been set in motion, and he warns that only remedy is that people accept his message.

== Lawh-i-Ra'ís (Tablet of the Chief) ==
See online text here

The Lawh-i Ra'ís (Persian: لوح رئيس) or "Tablet of the Chief", is also addressed to Âli Pasha. Baháʼu'lláh wrote this tablet in Persian shortly after his incarceration in Acre (August 1868) soon after the death of three of his followers.

In the second tablet, to Âli Pasha, Baháʼu'lláh further rebukes Âli Pasha for acts which Baháʼu'lláh claims are cruel, and compares him to those who had opposed the prophets of the past. Baháʼu'lláh states that Âli Pasha's true motives are self, passion and power, and blames him for visiting a number of cruelties on innocent people including sending women and young children to prison. He also writes about the treatment that the Baháʼís were given when incarcerated in Acre, which he states was inhumane, including receiving no food and water, causing two deaths. Baháʼu'lláh also informs Âli Pasha that if he would change course and accept Baháʼu'lláh's message, he would become transformed, but if he continues his ways God will chastise him from all directions.

In this tablet Baháʼu'lláh also states that while at Gallipoli he sent a message to the Sultan through a Turkish office asking for a face to face meeting where he could convey the truth of his message, and that he would be ready to produce anything the Sultan considered would be proof of the truth of his message. He stated that if in this meeting he fulfilled the Sultan's request, then the Sultan should release all the innocent prisoners. Baháʼu'lláh states that the Sultan never accepted His request.

== Lawh-i Fu'ád "Tablet of Fu'ad Pasha" ==
See online text here

The Lawh-i Fu'ád (Persian: لوح فؤاد) or Tablet of Fu'ád revealed in 1869 was addressed to S͟hayk͟h Kázim-i-Samandar, a native of Qazvin, and one of the Apostles of Baháʼu'lláh. The tablet was written in Arabic shortly after the death of Fu'ád Páshá, the foreign minister of Ottoman Empire, who was dismissed from his post in 1869 and died shortly thereafter in Nice, France.

Mehmed Fuad Pasha was a close collaborator of Grand Vizir Âli Pasha, who had exiled Baháʼu'lláh to the prison city of Acre. In the tablet, Baháʼu'lláh rebukes Fuad Pasha and states that God had taken his life as a punishment for inflicting suffering on Baháʼu'lláh. Baháʼu'lláh states that Fuad Pasha's soul will face the wrath of God in the afterlife.

Baháʼu'lláh in the tablet also foreshadows the downfall and the overthrow of both Sultan Abdülaziz and the Grand Vizir Âli Pasha. Soon thereafter, Âli Pasha was dismissed from his post, and died in 1871. At this time, opposition to the Sultan started which led to his losing power in 1876, and being killed a few days later.

Fulfillment of the prophecies in the Lawh-i Fu'ád regarding the downfall of the Sultan and the Grand Vizer played an important role in the conversion of Mírzá Abu'l-Faḍl, one of the Baháʼí Faith's foremost scholars.

Other topics discussed in the tablet include the spiritual consequences of the abuse of power as well as covenant-breaking.

== Súriy-i Mulúk "Tablet of Kings" ==
See online text here

The Súriy-i Mulúk (Persian: سورةى ملوك), or the Tablet of Kings is a tablet written by Baháʼu'lláh that was addressed collectively to the monarchs of the East and the West. The tablet was likely written in early 1868 in Arabic while he was in Adrianople.

The tablet has three main themes: the responsibility of kings to accept his message, some general counsel for kings and rulers, and the consequences of not accepting his message. Baháʼu'lláh discloses the character of his mission to the monarchs and tells them to accept his message. He states that he is the Manifestation of God for this age, and that his mission is to unite the human race. He also warns of the consequences of not following his advice. The tablet serves as a third stage of Baháʼu'lláh's claim to the station of He whom God shall make manifest to the world. The first stage consisted of Baháʼu'lláh telling those who accompanied him to Constantinople in the Garden of Ridván; the second stage consisted of Baháʼu'lláh announcing his station to all the members of the Bábí community in Adrianople through various tablets, and the final stage consisted of Baháʼu'lláh proclaiming his claim to the world at large through its kings and rulers.

In the tablet, Baháʼu'lláh first rebukes the kings for their failure to follow the message of the Báb, and then rebukes them further for not having accepted his own message:

My face hath come forth from the veils, and shed its radiance upon all that is in heaven and on earth; and yet, ye turned not towards Him, notwithstanding that ye were created for Him, O concourse of kings! Follow, therefore, that which I speak unto you, and hearken unto it with your hearts, and be not of such as have turned aside.

Baháʼu'lláh also counsels the kings on the qualities which they must exhibit. These include not laying aside the Fear of God, and following the laws of religion. He states that countries should work towards reducing their differences. In this way, weapons can be reduced which would assure the safety of the world and save money for the governments which can be used for other purposes. He tells the monarchs to limit their extravagance, and instead to live in moderation, so that the burden on their citizens will be lessened, and he tells them to deal justly with everyone, especially the poor. Having counseled the rulers, Baháʼu'lláh warns that if they do not follow his counsels God will chastise them from all directions.

While the tablet is addressed to all the rulers of the world, he writes to some specific groups as well. To the Christians he writes that he is the return of Jesus:

O kings of Christendom! Heard ye not the saying of Jesus, the Spirit of God, 'I go away, and come again unto you'? Wherefore, then, did ye fail, when He did come again unto you in the clouds of heaven, to draw nigh unto Him, that ye might behold His face, and be of them that attained His Presence? In another passage He saith: 'When He, the Spirit of Truth, is come, He will guide you into all truth.' And yet, behold how, when He did bring the truth, ye refused to turn your faces towards Him, and persisted in disporting yourselves with your pastimes and fancies. Ye welcomed Him not, neither did ye seek His Presence, that ye might hear the verses of God from His own mouth, and partake of the manifold wisdom of the Almighty, the All-Glorious, the All-Wise.

Baháʼu'lláh also addresses Sultan Abdülaziz, the only monarch addressed individually, and reproves him for entrusting the affairs of his empire to ministers whom he claims are not trustworthy. As for the ministers of the Sultan, Baháʼu'lláh criticizes them for actions which he claims are power-hungry. As for the clergy of Constantinople he denounces them for not investigating Baháʼu'lláh's message, and criticizes them as worshippers of "names" and lovers of leadership; he states that they are spiritually dead. To the philosophers of the world, Baháʼu'lláh warns them not to become proud of their knowledge, and he states that true wisdom and knowledge is to recognize the Manifestations of God and to follow his precepts.

In a message to the French ambassador of Constantinople, Baháʼu'lláh criticizes him for collaborating with the Qajar Ambassador to act against him, and claims that the ambassador was not following the teachings of Jesus Christ. As for the Qajar ambassador, Mirza Husayn Khan, Baháʼu'lláh blames him for actions which Baháʼu'lláh claims have caused injustice to himself.
