= Mírzá Abu'l-Faḍl =

Prominent Iranian Baháʼí scholar

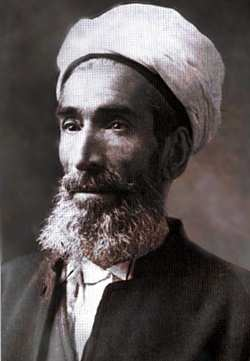
Mírzá Abu'l-Faḍl-i-Gulpáygání

Mírzá Muḥammad (Persian: ميرزا ابوالفضل), or Mírzá Abu'l-Faḍl-i-Gulpáygání (1844–1914), was the foremost Baháʼí scholar who helped spread the Baháʼí Faith in Egypt, Turkmenistan, and the United States. He is one of the few Apostles of Baháʼu'lláh who never actually met Baháʼu'lláh. His given name was Muhammad, and he chose the alias Abu'l-Faḍl (progenitor of virtue) for himself, but ʻAbdu'l-Bahá frequently addressed him as Abu'l-Fada'il (progenitor of virtues).

== Early life ==
Mírzá Abu'l-Faḍl was born in a village near Gulpaygan, Iran, in June or July 1844. His family were prominent religious scholars in the village; his father, Mirza Muhammad Rida Shariʻatmadar, was a religious leader, and his mother, Sharafu'n-Nisa, was related to the prayer leader of the town. Abu'l-Faḍl completed his preliminary education in Gulpaygan, and then successively went to Arak, Karbala and Najaf to continue his education. In 1868 he left for Isfahan to study Islamic sciences at one of the religious colleges in the city; he was given a room by one of the prayer leaders, Imam-Jumʻih, Sayyid Muhammad Sultanu'l-ʻUlama, who was a friend of his father's. Abu'l-Faḍl remained at the college for three years, becoming well-versed in several branches of knowledge. Abu'l-Faḍl's father died in the winter of 1871, and after his death, Abu'l-Faḍl's brothers schemed against him and took all their father's inheritance.

In October 1873, Mírzá Abu'l-Faḍl was invited to Tehran to teach Kalam, or speculative theology, at the Madrasih Hakim Hashim, one of the religious colleges in the city. During his time there he continued learning about philosophy and mystical philosophy, or Irfan, by attending the lectures of Mírzá Abu'l-Hasan Jilvih, one of the leading figures on the subject. He also discussed the history of religion with two Buddhist scholars who were in Tehran at the same time, and attended science classes at the élite school of Dar ol-Fonoon, founded by Amir Kabir, the grand vizier to Nasereddin Shah. After a short time at the Madrasih Hakim Hashim, he was selected to be the head of the religious college.

== Conversion to the Baháʼí Faith and arrests ==
Mírzá Abu'l-Faḍl's first encounters with Baháʼís was in the beginning of 1876 during his time in Tehran. Abu'l-Faḍl, at one point, met an uneducated cloth-seller, named Aqa ʻAbdu'l-Karim, with whom he would have discussions over difficult religious questions. Over time Abu'l-Faḍl came to appreciate ʻAbdu'l-Karim's keenness and moral qualities, but when eventually he learnt that ʻAbdu'l-Karim was a Baháʼí and that the points he was making were predominantly derived from Baháʼí scripture, Abu'l-Faḍl was saddened. Abu'l-Faḍl, however, became curious about the Baháʼí Faith, and asked to meet other Baháʼís. There is a famous story of Mírzá Abu'l-Faḍl's meeting with a Baháʼí blacksmith:

"It so happened that on the way out one of the donkeys lost a shoe, so the party called at the nearest blacksmith for help. Noticing the long beard and large turban of Mirza Abu'l-Faḍl -- indications of his vast knowledge -- the blacksmith Ustad Husayn-i-Na'l-Band (shoeing smith), who was illiterate, was tempted to enter into conversation with the learned man. He said to Mirza that since he had honoured him with his presence, it would be a great privilege for him if he could be allowed to ask a question which had perplexed his mind for some time. When permission was granted he said, 'Is it true that in the Traditions of Shí'ah Islam it is stated that each drop of rain is accompanied by an angel from heaven? And that this angel brings down the rain to the ground?' 'This is true,' Mirza Abu'l-Faḍl responded. After a pause, the blacksmith begged to be allowed to ask another question to which Mirza gave his assent. 'Is it true', the blacksmith asked, 'that if there is a dog in a house no angel will ever visit that house?' Before thinking of the connection between the two questions, Mirza Abu'l-Faḍl responded in the affirmative. 'In that case', commented the blacksmith, 'no rain should ever fall in a house where a dog is kept.' Mirza Abu'l-Faḍl, the noted learned man of Islam, was now confounded by an illiterate blacksmith. His rage knew no bounds, and his companions noticed that he was filled with shame. They whispered to him, 'This blacksmith is a Baháʼí!'"

In the next several months, Abu'l-Faḍl met with some of the leading Baháʼís including Nabíl-i-Akbar, Mirza Ismaʻil Dhabih and Aqa Mirza Haydar ʻAli Ardistani. While he was at Mirza Ismaʻil Dhabih's house, he read two of Baháʼu'lláh's tablets, the Lawh-i-Ra'ís (Tablet of the Chief) and the Lawh-i-Fu'ád (Tablet of Fu'ad Pasha), which contain prophecies both of the fall of the Ottoman Sultan Abd-ul-Aziz and vizier ʻAli Páshá and of the loss of Adrianople from the Sultan. He determined that if the events portrayed in those tablets came to pass, he would believe in Baháʼu'lláh.

A few months later, when precisely the events foretold in the tablets occurred, Mírzá Abu'l-Faḍl accepted the Baháʼí Faith and became a Baháʼí on 20 September 1876. As soon as he became a Baháʼí, Abu'l-Faḍl began to teach the new religion to others, and when news spread of his conversion away from Islam, he was removed from the religious college. He found a new position as a teacher at a school for Zoroastrian children that was established by Mánikc͟hi Sáhib, an Indian Parsi. During his time at the school, a number of Zoroastrians converted to the Baháʼí Faith including Ustad Javanmard and Mulla Bahram Akhtar-Khavari. He continued to teach the Baháʼí Faith during the next ten years that he spent in Tehran, and helped Mírzá Husayn Hamadani produce an account of the history of the Bábí and Baháʼí religions, the Tarikh-i-Jadid (The New History), which was commissioned by Mánikc͟hi Sáhib. In Tehran, he was also imprisoned on three occasions. He was first imprisoned in December 1876 when it was found that he had converted to the Baháʼí Faith; he was released after five months. He was next imprisoned in 1882-83 for 19 months, with 50 or so other Baháʼís in Tehran, when the governor of the city, Kamran Mirza, ordered their arrests at the instigation of Sayyid Sadiq Sanglaji, a religious leader in the city. Then, in October 1885 he was imprisoned for another six months, once again, due to orders from Kamran Mirza.

== Travels ==
After his 1882 imprisonment, he began extensive travels throughout the Persian Empire, especially after he received letters from Baháʼu'lláh in 1886 asking him to travel to teach the Baháʼí Faith. It was principally through his writings that the Baháʼí Faith was presented to the Jews of Iran in such a way as to bring a large number of them into accepting Baháʼu'lláh. During his travels in Iran he visited Kashan, Isfahan, Yazd and Tabriz. In 1888 and the three years thereafter he travelled to Ashgabat, Samarkand, and Bukhara. During his time in Ashgabat, Haji Muhammad Rida Isfahani, a prominent Baháʼí was assassinated; Abu'l-Faḍl acted as the spokesman on behalf of the Baháʼí at the trial of the murders, and helped establish the independence of the Baháʼí Faith from Islam for the Russian government. In Samarkand, his teaching efforts allowed for the conversion of the first Afghan Baháʼí, Dr. ʻAta'u'llah Khan.

In 1894 Abu'l-Faḍl spent ten months with ʻAbdu'l-Bahá in 'Akká, then in 1894 went to Cairo, where he settled for several years. In Egypt, he was successful in converting some 30 of the students of Al-Azhar University, the foremost institution of learning in the Sunni Muslim world. Abu'l-Faḍl also became friends with writers and magazine publishers, and he authored many articles in the Egyptian press. In 1896, when Nasiru'd-Din Shah was assassinated in Iran, an enemy of the Baháʼís, Zaʻimu'd-Dawlih, used the rumour that the assassination had been performed by Baháʼís, to cause a massacre of the Baháʼís in Egypt. When Abu'l-Faḍl stood up in defence for the Baháʼís and stated that he himself was a Baháʼí, his allegiance became public; then when his two books Fara'id and Al-Duraru'l-Bahiyyih were published in 1897-1900 the al-Azhar University decreed that Abu'l-Faḍl was an infidel.

Between 1900 and 1904 he travelled to Paris and the United States, by request of ʻAbdu'l-Bahá, where his talks and writings enabled the fledgling Baháʼí communities to gain confidence and a clear understanding of the religion. During his travels, he was accompanied by Laura Clifford Barney, an American Baháʼí. In Paris, his talks were translated by Anton Haddad, and over 30 people became Baháʼís. Then in the autumn of 1901 he travelled to the United States, and specifically to Chicago, where the largest Baháʼí community was, and gave a large number of talks. Then in December 1901, Abu'l-Faḍl travelled to Washington D.C. and gave talks to both Baháʼís and the general population. During this time, he also continuously worked on an introductory book on the Baháʼí Faith.

Abu'l-Faḍl then travelled to the Green Acre Baháʼí School in Eliot, Maine where he stayed during July and August 1903 and lectured to a Baháʼí audience. In 1904, ʻAbdu'l-Bahá asked that Abu'l-Faḍl return to the Middle East, and the Baháʼís held a large farewell gathering for him in New York City on 29 November 1904.

== Later years ==
Mírzá Abu'l-Faḍl lived most of his later years in Cairo until his death on 21 January 1914. During his final years, he visited Beirut and Haifa. Abu'l-Faḍl was in Egypt when ʻAbdu'l-Bahá visited Egypt in August 1910, and he stayed near ʻAbdu'l-Bahá in Alexandria in mid 1911. Near the end of 1912, Abu'l-Faḍl he became ill, and Aqa Muhammad-Taqi Isfahani was able to move Abu'l-Faḍl to his house in Cairo, where he remained until his death on 21 January 1914.

After his death, ʻAbdu'l-Bahá gave a eulogy which can be found in Baháʼí Proofs. Moojan Momen, a historian of Baháʼí studies, states that Abu'l-Faḍl possessed a critical mind, and had a complete devotion to the Baháʼí Faith. Momen states that Abu'l-Faḍl's writings "show a keen understanding of modern currents of thought remarkable in a man who only knew oriental languages." and was able to apply the Baháʼí teachings to a wide range of different issues.

== As an author ==
Mírzá Abu'l-Faḍl wrote on a wide range of Baháʼí subjects, including extensive amounts of material about the proofs of Baháʼu'lláh's mission. He was consistently praised by the central figures of the Baháʼí Faith and Shoghi Effendi. His papers and letters include a wide range of presentations of the Baháʼí Faith for those of Christian and Jewish backgrounds, and his concepts in the presentation of the Baháʼí Faith continue to be important today. After his death, his papers, including several unfinished works, were taken to Ashqabat, where his nephew lived; many of these papers were, however, lost during the Russian Revolution.

ʻAbdu'l-Bahá once wrote, referring to The Brilliant Proof:

"His Honour Mírzá Abu'l-Faḍl has written a treatise answering the criticisms of a London preacher. Each one of you should have a copy. Read, memorize and reflect upon it. Then, when accusations and criticisms are advanced by those unfavourable to the Cause, you will be well armed."

== Publications ==
- Fara'id (The Peerless Gems): A book written in 1898 in reply to a critique on the Kitáb-i-Íqán and published in Cairo. Generally considered Mírzá Abu'l-Faḍl's greatest work, written in Persian, with occasional citations of Arabic statements.
- Al-Duraru'l-Bahiyyih (The Shining Pearls): Published in 1900, it is a collection of essays on the history of the Baháʼí Faith. Since it was written in Arabic, it was responsible for making the Baháʼís known in Egypt. It has been translated by Juan Cole as Miracles and Metaphors (Mírzá Abu'l-Faḍl Gulpáygání (1981), Miracles and metaphors, Los Angeles: Kalimát Press, ISBN 0-933770-22-7)
- Burhan-i-Lamiʻ (The Brilliant Proof): Published, along with an English translation, in Chicago in 1912, the paper responds to a Christian clergyman's questions. Republished as Mírzá Abu'l-Faḍl Gulpáygání (1998), The Brilliant Proof, Los Angeles: Kalimát Press
- Sharh-i-Ayat-i-Mu'arrakhih (In Explanation of Massacre Verses that Prophesy Dates): Written in 1888, the work discusses the date of the prophecies concerning the coming of the Promised One in the scriptures of Islam, Christianity, Judaism, and Zoroastrianism.
- Risalih Ayyubiyyih (Treatise addressed to Ayyub): Written in 1887, concerning prophecies relating to the Promised One in the Torah.
- Faslu'l-Khitab (The Decisive Utterance): A large book written in Samarqand in 1892; among its subjects, it discusses the traditions in Shia Islam regarding the persecution of the Promised One. The book was written in reply to a critique by an Adharbayjan Shia cleric. No known copy of the work exists.
- Risaliyyih Iskandaraniyyih: Published along with Al-Duraru'l-Bahiyyih, the paper provides proofs for Muhammad's prophethood from Christian and Jewish scripture. It also explains the verse from the Qurʼan "Then it is ours to explain it."
- The Kitab-i-Ibrar (Book of Justification): While no manuscript of this book currently exists, it was referred to in Abu'l-Faḍl's other works and seems to have dealt with the Covenant.
- Al-Hujaju'l-Baháʼíyyih (The Baháʼí Proofs): A book written while in the United States, which explains and defends the Baháʼí Faith from a Christian point of view.
- Kashfu'l-Ghita (The Uncovering of Error): After E.G. Browne published the Nuqtatu'l-Kaf, which was hostile to the Baháʼí Faith, Abu'l-Faḍl began working on refutations of that book. When he learned that other Baháʼí scholars had also started working on refutations that had reached an advanced stage, he suspended his writing. He never completed the book, and when his papers were sent to his cousin in Ashkhabad, his cousin worked on completing the book, of which 132 of 438 pages are written by Abu'l-Faḍl.

=== Letters ===
In addition to the books that Abu'l-Faḍl wrote, he also wrote a number of shorter works in response to questions addressed to him; some of these letters have been published in a number of compilations:

- Majmuʻiy-i-Rasaʼil-i-Hadrat-i-Abi'l-Faḍl: Published in Cairo in 1920 and contains 16 letters and treatises.
- Rasa'il wa Raqa'im: Published in Persian in Tehran in 1977, and contains 23 treatises and 59 letters. Some of the treatises from this work have been translated by Juan Cole into English in Letters & Essays including:
  - Two treatises on the Covenant: Published in 1911 in Cairo consisting of two treatises written in 1899 and 1896 which deal with proofs from the Bible and the Qurʼan, and about the actions of Covenant-breakers.
  - Risalih Iskandariyyih (Treatise of Alexander): Written in response to a request by E.G. Browne to write about the life of Baháʼu'lláh among other things. The letter was named in honour of Alexander Tumansky, who had also requested information about Baháʼu'lláh.
  - Al-Bab wa'l-Babiyyih (The Báb and Bábísm): A brief history of the Baháʼí Faith commissioned by the editor of the Egyptian magazine Al-Muqtataf after the assassination of Nasser al-Din Shah.
- A treatise regarding Baháʼu'lláh's ancestry which traces it to the last Sasanian king, Yazdgerd III. Part of this text was translated by H.M. Balyuzi and published in his book Eminent Baháʼís in the time of Baháʼu'lláh.

== See also ==
- Mírzá Asadu'llah Fádil Mázandarání (1881–1957)
- ʻAbdu'l-Hamíd Ishráq-Khávari (1902–1972)
- Adib Taherzadeh (1921–2000)
