= Richard Walter Thomas =

Retired African-American professor (born 1939)

- Born: April 2, 1939 (age 87); Detroit, Michigan
- Known for: Scholarly works
- Spouse: June Manning Thomas
- Children: 2

Academic background
- Education: Michigan State University
- Alma mater: University of Michigan at Ann Arbor
- Thesis: Black history of Detroit from 1915 to 1945 (1976)

Academic work
- Discipline: Black issues and Race relations
- Institutions: Michigan State University

Richard Walter Thomas (born April 2, 1939) is a retired African-American professor of Michigan State University known for his work in black issues and race relations. He has published a number of scholarly works, his poetry has been gathered in various anthologies, and he has given a variety of talks, workshops, and interviews on issues of race and race relations.

Born and raised in Detroit, Michigan, in his later youth Thomas was introduced to the early forms of black power movements and joined the Baháʼí Faith in 1962. He met people like Margaret Danner and Ron Milner. Thomas then became a student at Michigan State University (MSU) in 1966. When he returned home that summer he experienced the 1967 Detroit riot, and after some campus activism and success publishing, in his junior year he attended the funeral of Martin Luther King Jr. and began an activism on race issues on and beyond campus. In his senior year Thomas founded an assistance program for black students on campus, wrote for the campus newspaper and transitioned directly to a Master's Degree program. In 1970 Thomas graduated and joined the staff of the new Center for Urban Affairs on campus and his poetry was included in A galaxy of black writing. Around the same time Thomas married South Carolinian June Manning. Before coming to MSU in 1968 she had been part of the reaction to the Orangeburg massacre. Both continued to hold various positions over the next few years and by 1976 they had two children and both began to pursue PhDs at the University of Michigan at Ann Arbor – he finished his in 1976 on black history of Detroit from 1915 to 1945 and she finished hers in 1977.

Returning to MSU in 1979, Thomas started as an associate professor of racial and ethnic studies working in the department's new program in the study of human rights. It was the first campus program that would feature African-American history as well as examples from the wider world of race issues and the work being done to address them. That year he also co-wrote the book Blacks and Chicanos in Urban Michigan. The Thomas' kept up service and visibility in the Baháʼí community such as being present for the 50th anniversary of Louhelen Baháʼí School. Thomas gave a 30 minute talk at the 9th Association of Baháʼí Studies (ABS) conference in 1984 and would continue to contribute to ABS conferences and publications in succeeding years: a day-long seminar on inter-cultural issues, a convener and editor for invited papers on "Models of racial unity" and the Hasan M. Balyuzi Memorial Lectureship. He also contributed a chapter to a book Circle of Unity. Thomas also began to make appearances at and gave assistance to initiatives on race justice and equality in communities such as in Chicago at an award-winning program.

In 1987 Thomas was named a professor at MSU and co-wrote Detroit: Race and Uneven Development via Temple University Press, a text that has been updated and printed by MSU Press. His contribution highlighted what Thomas began to think of as the "Other Tradition" of black-white cooperation, anti-racism. That same year Thomas became a founding member of the Black Men's Gathering (BMG) to encourage the leadership of service of black men in the religion. In 1992 Thomas revised his PhD and published Life for Us is what We Make it: Building Black Community in Detroit, 1915–1945 through Indiana University Press and the Thomas' were also noted attending the Baháʼí World Congress. Now using the term "The Other Tradition", in 1993 Thomas wrote Racial Unity: An Imperative for Social Progress and Understanding interracial unity: a study of U.S. race relations. 1996 was the beginning of the implementation of the Multi-Racial Unity Living Experience (MRULE) project at MSU he founded with one of his advanced degree students and was eventually the subject of several advanced degrees at several universities. In 1997 Thomas contributed a chapter to a book on how non-profit non-governmental organizations contributed to social justice in Social justice philanthropy reviewing the American Baháʼí community as one case. Since 1997 Thomas had often been elected annually to the Regional Baháʼí Council of the area – a mid-level institution with responsibilities over Baháʼí communities in several states. In 2002 Thomas wrote Bridging Racial Divides in Michigan's Urban Communities published through MSU Press and several decades of work culminated in the text Lights of the Spirit: Historical Portraits of Black Baháʼís in North America, 1898–2004 with Thomas as a co-editor, wrote three chapters of it, and was published by the US Baháʼí Publishing Trust. In 2007 Thomas contributed to The State of black Michigan, 1967–2007 by MSU Press and his poetry was included in Black Fire: An Anthology of Afro-American Writing.

In 2012 Thomas retired from MSU. In 2013 he wrote and co-wrote two texts – Disenfranchisement: Social Health Issues and Implications and Detroit: Race Riots, Racial Conflicts, and Efforts to Bridge the Racial Divide. Since 2015 he has made several appearances discussing "The Other Tradition" theme.

== Biography ==
=== Born and raised in Detroit ===
Richard Walter Thomas was born April 2, 1939, in Detroit, Michigan, son of Walter and Estelle Thomas, living in the Brewster-Douglass Housing Projects, near Hastings Street, later calling it a ghetto. The Brewster-Douglass Project were built for the "working poor"; the Detroit Housing Commission required an employed parent for each family before establishing tenancy.

Thomas commented his father didn't believe in non-violence such as by Dr. Martin Luther King Jr., though they did support the union movement in the city. Thomas recalled his parents talking about the 1943 Detroit race riot and said it affected the state of race identity and relations as he grew up and he still gets nervous from the history of "boundaries" and warnings his parents gave him of crossing them in the 1940s and 50s. In the period from 1940 to 1950, more than 66% of the black population in Detroit had been born outside the area, with most born in the South. The increase in population had strained city schools and services for all residents and began an era from 1950 to 1970 of de facto racial segregation in the Metro Detroit area. Those white people who were more established economically moved out of the city to newly developed suburbs, which often were divided by class and income levels. In that period black growth in the suburbs averaged 2.7%, while in previous decades it had been 5%. Social tensions increased as blacks felt oppressed by discrimination, a majority-white police force, and restricted housing.

Thomas was a graduate of the last non-integrated class of Miller High School in 1957, after which he joined the United States Marine Corps. He was discharged from the Marines in 1960, returned to Detroit to live with his parents and four siblings. Contrasting with being a black man serving in an integrated military, he recalls being arrested near Canfield Ave and W Woodward Ave in Detroit as part of the norms in Detroit, akin to an incident of Driving while black and that stores and hospitals would not serve blacks.

He "flitted with the idea of becoming a minister" but other friends inspired him to try poetry instead. "This is one of the roads that led me to the (Baháʼí) Faith".

=== Black Poetry and Baháʼí ===
Thomas hung out at Bill and Marie "Mama" Summer's home. There he encountered the National Islam, even being "courted" and visiting an orthodox Muslim home, as well as Marie's less heated and "rough street approach" of her husband Bill. While at their home, Thomas encountered "...Fred _ , (who) was a Baháʼí white graduate student from Wayne State University (WSU,) and 'was very naive about race'". "Fred's religion did not interest me at the time. I was too involved in poetry." Nevertheless, it was Fred who introduced Thomas to the work of Margaret Danner – a Baha'i and well known black poet and then poet-in-residence at WSU and stayed at the home of Naomi Oden. Thomas was invited to share his poetry with Danner and he was "ecstatic" to visit a published black poet though he felt threatened by the mention of the religion. Thomas also met black poet Ron Milner and "with their help and inspiration I got myself together." Danner was visible in the local Detroit news from July. Danner and Milner were among a group working on publishing in 1961.

==== Joined the Baháʼí Faith ====
The presence of Baháʼís was visible in Detroit back to 1916; and well known Baháʼís visited – Martha Root, and Louis George Gregory. The Davison area Louhelen Baháʼí School opened in 1931 some 60 miles away. 1960 opened with the Baháʼís holding World Religion Day, followed by the June Race Amity Day talk, and classes on the Baháʼí view of race unity at Louhelen. In 1961 the Baháʼís in Detroit held the Race Unity Picnic, and WSU hosted a multifaith meeting that included the Baháʼí Club in the autumn. Thomas recalled his fundamentalist Black Baptist mother thinking talk about interracial unity was from communists. Nevertheless Thomas joined the religion in 1962 after a period of study. As he says:

I had got quite comfortable hanging out with Baháʼís, ... (and) was seriously studying the Faith, but for me, a devout Baptist, a monumental religious barrier stood in the way: was Bahá'u'lláh really the return of the Spirit of Christ? ... It would have profound personal, family, social and church community consequences. And Mama Bruce was not budging. 'Boy!!' she exclaimed one day. 'Do you know what day you're living in!!?' She would not suffer vacillation, foolish or otherwise.

I know exactly where I was and what I was doing when I decided to accept Bahá'u'lláh as the return of the Spirit of Christ and the Prophet of God for this day: sitting at the dining room table in my parents' house reading Thief in the Night .... Then, thanks to Mr. Bill Sears's wonderful book, it struck me! These people, these good, God-intoxicated Christians in 1844 were looking in the wrong place! They were searching for the Second Coming in the clouds of their spiritual misunderstanding.... As much as I loved my mom, minister, friends, Sunday school teachers, and dearly loved listening and singing and swaying with the choir, I had to make a decision, scary as it was to make. I decided in that quiet night, while the household slept, that I was going to accept Bahá'u'lláh as the return of the Christ Spirit, as the Prophet for this day and age.

Naomi and Mama Bruce would leap with joy! But, Lord help me! What would Mom say when she heard I was not only leaving the church of my birth but joining a strange religion that placed a strange Prophet on the same level as precious Jesus, who rescued our slave forebears and softened our present sorrows and grief.... I now recall how I did not help matters much by being overly enthusiastic about my new Faith. I could have been far more diplomatic in my dealings with Mom and my former church community but I was young and excited and inspired by the stories of the Báb and the Bábís and their sacrifices of life and limb.... At the same time, it also inspired me more than I had ever been inspired by the years of listening to preaching, choir singing and Sunday school lessons. The more I read of the life of the Báb, Bahá'u'lláh and `Abdu'l-Bahá, the more I wanted to tell the entire world, to hit the streets like the Bábís, proclaiming the good news to everyone who would listen, regardless of the risks.

But this was a turbulent time for black Baháʼís and Thomas speaks of his own struggles:

There were times when, like other young African-American Baháʼís, I found myself at odds with older Baháʼís views of the racial crisis. We younger African-Americans were greatly influenced by Malcolm X and the civil rights and Black Power movements. We were the first generation of African-American Baháʼís to be shaped by these powerful social forces.... This tended to strain relationships within local Baháʼí communities between some older Black and White Baháʼís, ... and younger Black 'radical' Baháʼís.... The latter's concerns were often interpreted by the former as a source of disunity. On the other hand, the younger Black Baháʼís felt that some of the older Baháʼís wanted to maintain the racial status quo within the Baháʼí community. Thanks to older, wiser and especially sensitive African-American Baháʼís such as Naomi, ... we were able to survive our frustrations and eventually come to terms with those Baháʼís who were not yet prepared to challenge the racial status quo, even as the racial conflicts of the 1960s exploded around them. In the process we learned a valuable lesson about the power of the Covenant to create unity in the midst of racial and cultural differences."

Out of this, Thomas says, "For the first time in my angry bag, I was able to see what Black poets could do with an eye big as the earth." In 1966 Marie Bruce had gone to Mississippi. The year Thomas joined the religion opened with the Baháʼís mentioned in the newspaper in January. In March another article profiled the religion, and then a Baháʼí appeared on local television. That Fall an advertising campaign promoted the claims of Bahá'u'lláh in Detroit associated with some meetings organized by Winston Evans. Margaret Danner was still noted active in the area for years to come. Naomi was a businesswoman and joined the religion in 1949. Naomi would be noted in the newspaper at her death in 1987 with long years of service in the community.

==== Louhelen and SC ====
In 1964 Thomas took part in an initiative similar to the Freedom Summer campaign with connections at the Baháʼí School in Michigan, later called Louhelen Baháʼí School, and the burgeoning Baháʼí community of Greenville, South Carolina, which was integrating its schools that Fall. Training sessions for a project were noted in the Baháʼí News in August. Some 80 youth attended the training in mid-June with faculty like Firuz Kazemzadeh. After the classes in various subjects, 27 individuals went to 8 locations including Greenville, S.C. Six youth including Thomas went to Greenville under the sponsorship of the local assembly there for a 6 week program. Local youth joined in. The group worked on tutoring some 55 black students about to attend newly integrating schools, held informational meetings on the religion, and supported petitioning for the public swimming pool being integrated. The work was capped with a parent-teacher banquet reception at a church and a picnic for the students conducted by the Baháʼí teachers. The group visited many churches, restaurants, parks, stores, and a community center to demonstrate solidarity with the black community. Side ventures included the Baháʼí Summer School near Asheville, NC, going to Greensboro, NC, and the Southern Christian Leadership Conference training camp near Savannah, GA. Thomas met men who cooperated with projects he was later involved with: John Mangum, and William "Smitty" Smith. Thomas recalled that black and white Baháʼís stayed in the homes of the other color and that their efforts received threatening notes because they held interracial meetings. Thomas also recalled a tense morning breakfast he and a white Baháʼí went on one Sunday morning.

Back in Detroit later in the spring of 1965 Joe Louis' sister, Eulalia Barrow Bobo, gave a talk on the religion, followed a couple days later by a resister of the Nazi regime and soon Baha'i,(next year) Rosey E. Pool.

=== Michigan State University ===
Thomas was soon to attend Michigan State University (MSU) in Lansing, Michigan. There was Baháʼí activity on MSU campus before Thomas arrived in 1966. The Baháʼí club was officially organized in 1963. John Magnum, a former police officer and a Golden Gloves champion, was also on campus – he had been involved in the 1964 trip to Greenville, S.C. Magnum was also an original member of the Black Men's Group with Thomas.

==== Freshman ====
That Fall when Thomas entered as a freshman, a slideshow of Baháʼís held on campus in July. The Baháʼí club at MSU that fall had four Baha'is – Bob Cameron, Faramarz Samadany, Richard Thomas himself, and Kenneth Gottlied. That year's state Baháʼí convention to elect a delegate to the national convention was held in Lansing and expected some 300 to attend. The club opened 1967 sponsoring a talk, followed by a profiles of the religion published in the campus newspaper, and presented a panel discussion on racial crisis and the international situation. Thomas' poetry was also criticized in the student newspaper. Later that Spring Robert L. Green, who had worked with Martin Luther King Jr and the Southern Christian Leadership Committee, criticized some black students, including Thomas, while attending a campus Malcolm X rally – that if they believed in black nationalism they were being hypocritical for staying on the white MSU campus vs being on the streets like Malcolm X but then complimented them for various actions he knew they were involved with and working towards an integrated society as the "... best hope for freedom and equality for black people...."

Thomas, at home in Detroit that summer, was there amidst the 1967 Detroit riot, one of 159 riots that swept cities in the United States during the "Long Hot Summer of 1967". He recalls calling it the "rebellion"; the most severe riot in Detroit ever and the worst of the country that year, but as in comments of Joe Darden, that the conflict included dimensions beyond black-white issues.

==== Sophomore ====
The Fall of 1967 was noted with the Baháʼí community observing the centenary of Bahá'u'lláh's Summons of the Lord of Hosts with the Baháʼís in Lansing, Thomas taught a session that winter as part of an overall theme of the anticipated centennial observations. In February 1968 Thomas wrote a letter to the editor responding to what he saw as a defensive reaction by campus administration to demands made for teaching black history. In early April Thomas wrote a review of black poetry debating LeRoi Jones vs Robert Hayden. He supported that Jones was reflected more in black society while Hayden pursued black identity amidst human reality and then stated both are needed for a complete picture. "They are proclaiming the aesthetic legitimacy of each flower in the human garden – as black flowers." And then Thomas contributed three poems to the newspaper: "The 9th Savior", "Ethnography of a downtown joint", "Edith mother of man". One stanza of "Edith":

Edith mother of man

and sister of broken brothers
who wore their iron too black
would not adjust their speed
to quit bumping the white sun

in their bleeding skies

Thomas later recalled a black student organization was born on campus following the speech of Congress of Racial Equality's Floyd McKissick at MSU. In late April Thomas was a representative of the Black Student Alliance at MSU "Days of Conscience" investigations in the campus relationships to the Vietnam war. He spoke of the "assassination of MLK and its implication on white America.... (to those that mourned his assassination) Tears are not enough... (to those that inherited white racism) there will be no rest", blamed both sets of whites for the death, and then addressed the black students to question if "'law and order' was orderly racism, not justice." In May an essay by Thomas' was first place in a campus contest in the humanities school with reviewers affirming it as both highly scholarly and an organic expression of culture. Thomas' award winning essay begins as an analysis/reflection of Camus' The Stranger and The Plague as going towards a new morality, a new humanism: "a shift, a deliberate sensitizing of the basic components of humanity that are a very real and essential part of us – to extend ourselves into another person's soul as they are." And that year Nine Black Poets was published which included Thomas' work, considered one of the significant works of the year, though at least one reviewer found the attention of calling to God tiresome.

==== Junior ====
Thomas had attended the funeral of Martin Luther King, Jr, and wrote an article for the student newspaper. In it Thomas reviews hearing attendees struggle with the assassination as framed between various points of view. On one side was NAACP leader from NC Robert Williams (who felt non-violence should only be seen as a tactic and not a principle) and those advancing the non-violence and civil disobedience approach by talking with others. Then Thomas gave a talk about the relevance of MSU to "black power" speaking on behalf of the Black Student Alliance. Later in August Thomas wrote an article on the Baháʼís and the race crisis in the campus newspaper. He summarized `Abdu'l-Bahá's actions in light of race and then America as a place of the international struggle of racism. He underscored the standards at Baháʼí schools following `Abdu'l-Bahá's guidance and then Shoghi Effendi on inter-racial unity and that this had particularized to the voting system inside the religion and quoted Shoghi Effendi's "most challenging issue" statement at length. In September Thomas is called a Special Assistant to the "National Baháʼí Department of Youth and College Activities" and was quoted speaking of how to be relevant across a cultural divide: "Unity in diversity rather than integration, which is paternalistic, is the thing." Thomas also spoke at a Phoenix gathering sponsored by the assembly. In October Thomas wrote an article for the MSU news about the increasing complexity of leadership in black power movements, some only tangentially interested in addressing the social change while other leaders were becoming insensitive to engaging the wider community with an increasing "more radical-than-thou" tone, and then speaking in November for the Black Student Association sisterhood. Hayden again appeared on MSU campus in November. After the winter break an article covered Baháʼí activity in the Lansing community and noted there were 16 Baháʼís in the area, and then that summer the community had a Race Unity picnic.

==== Senior ====
In 1969 Thomas co-founded a black aid program. That summer Thomas attended the "YOW! summer seminar" of youth facing social justice issues for the Baháʼí Faith. Thomas shared "his experience as a black man and a black Baháʼí, exposed daily to the anger and agony of fellow blacks in the North, forever having to explain to the increasingly fervid adherents of black nationalism and black liberation his continued involvement in a movement that is not only "religious" but interracial. Then Thomas attended a youth Baháʼí conference at Frogmore, SC where he spoke. Back in Lansing the film "A New Wind" was debuted for the Birth of Bahá'u'lláh observance. That year Thomas was among those proposed by a black student organization to begin offering classes at MSU that winter of 1969–70.

In the spring of 1970 Thomas spoke at a national conference on education among Baháʼís for a focus on minorities. and then there were talks on campus on the religion, including sponsored by the club. That summer Baháʼís held Race Unity Day picnic. Meanwhile Thomas finished his Master's Thesis.

=== Professional academic and married ===
==== Center for Urban Affairs ====
In 1970 Thomas was noted contributing to a book A galaxy of black writing. At the same time the Lansing Baháʼí assembly undertook various actions and observances, and often with the college club such as UN Day, and World Religion Day.

In 1968 the MSU Board of Trustees created a combination unit of the Center for Urban Affairs and Equal Opportunities Programs (CUE-EOP) to develop instructional, research and service programs relative to urban and minority programs; to facilitate an increase in minority faculty, staff and students at MSU; and to develop an affirmative action and anti-discrimination program for the university. In 1970, the CUA-EOP office separated and with the Center for Urban Affairs(CUA) retaining most of the budget. Thomas contributed some poems to the student newspaper and the article noted he was recently married and now worked in the Center for Urban Affairs. Richard's wife was June Manning. June, daughter of then Claflin University president Reverend Hubert V. and Ethel Manning, The reverend was president starting in 1956, moving from Charleston, SC. June attended the black Wilkinson High School for 1963–4 and then was to finish her high school in the newly integrating Orangeburg High School in 1964 which she attended through 1967. June was one of about a dozen black students who desegregated the formerly all-white school. June attended a special summer training school for experience before hand, similar to the project Richard had taken part in in Greenville. And the integration process was from a lawsuit of her parents and was June's 10th grade. During her senior year she learned of the Baháʼí Faith. Some supportive contributions to her transition came from some white friends and teachers who demonstrated personal comfort with her and respect. June's experiences were included in a middle-school spiritual training text. June won national awards despite the violence done to her by others at the school, and attended Furman University as part of the class after the first black student attended there the year before, and where she made the Dean's list. The Orangeburg massacre happened during her last year at Furman and she worked as a voting educator before coming to MSU in 1968. She continued to achieve high grades, scholarships and awards at MSU. In 1970 she was co-director in the Office of Black Affairs and finished her BA in Sociology, graduating magna cum laude and joined Phi Beta Kappa. Thomas recalled his brother attending the marriage and seeing the diversity of people attending the Baháʼí wedding commenting "What is this, the United Nations?!?" Thomas' employment was initially part time but shifted to full-time in June 1972.

In the fall of 1971 the Baháʼís held UN Day with the club. On campus there was a shuffle of jobs at the CUA. Meanwhile the club at MSU held a meeting about "revitalizing" education. At the time June was a research assistant at the Center for Urban Affairs. That Fall Thomas gave a talk on campus about the struggles of black men in America. Next April Thomas was among those also spoke at a series of Baháʼí seminars in the city. In April 1973 Thomas was shifted from being an instructor and research director for media projects to instructor in racial and ethnic studies. That summer the Baháʼís held Race Unity Day, and in the fall Thomas' mother Estelle joined in a letter to the editor community response to a case of harassment in Detroit.

In 1974 June was Policy Planner in the Michigan Department of Social Services for a few months but for the next couple years had no professional or academic work on her vita. However she made her first appearance giving a Baháʼí talk. In November the MSU campus Baháʼís were active and the Thomas' were among those hosting Baháʼí events in their home. Thomas spoke again a couple weeks later, and they hosted events in their home in succeeding weeks the rest of 1974, and into 1975. As a PhD student Thomas was teaching a class on race relations at the University of Michigan at Ann Arbor and a professor asked him "why was he wasting his time".

In the autumn of 1975 June and Richard published an article in Futurology. All along Thomas had been working on his PhD which he finished January 1976. He noted now 5 years since being married they had two children: Kemba and Ali. And along the period June also worked on her PhD.

In late February 1976 Thomas was among those who answered student questions responding to three hooded men who marched through campus. In March Baháʼís from four communities gathered for a Baháʼí New Year observance at which Thomas spoke.

==== Assistant/associate professor ====
The next several years the Thomas' and the regional Baháʼí community were visible in various circumstances and events. That summer June was an Instructor in Urban & Metropolitan Studies at MSU and finished her PhD in 1977. There were four distinct communities of Baháʼís around the Lansing area in a survey of religious communities published in the local newspaper. The Bahá'is organized public meetings and observances. In January 1977 Thomas was mentioned among all the MSU professors that contributed to The Third Coast. The Civic Art Center in Battle Creek hosted "Riverlight Poetry Fair" where Thomas appeared with Dudley Randall in May. That year June was an assistant professor in a joint effort of the Departments of Urban & Metropolitan Studies and Urban Planning at MSU. The following January 1978 Thomas gave the talk for the Baháʼí sponsored World Religion Day in Lansing. That year Thomas was listed as an assistant professor of Racial and Ethnic Studies. Both Thomas' aided in the coordination of a public meeting as part of a race unity conference held at MSU sponsored by the four area assemblies. The public meeting featured a talk by Magdalene Carney, then a member of the National Spiritual Assembly of the Baháʼís of the United States. Follow-up coverage summarized Carney's speech. In December both Thomas', with Tina Guy and Napolun Birdsall, were on the committee for holding the Human Rights Day event sponsored by the Lansing Baháʼí assembly.

Professional advances also came along for both Thomas'. In 1979 Thomas was interviewed for the campus radio station WKAR; he was called an associate professor of racial and ethnic studies and discussed the department's new program in the study of human rights. There would be four new classes as part of it – introduction to human rights, violations of human rights, human rights advocates, and affirmative action. He thought interested students would be aiming at policy and programs of the topics and those who want to learn about these issues, the traditions of human rights and violations and wider context of these around the world and across disciplines. That year Thomas also authored a chapter of, and co-edited, Blacks and Chicanos in Urban Michigan. His chapter was entitled "The black urban experience in Detroit: 1916–1967," occupying nearly 30 pages of the text. In 1980 both Thomas', along with others co-authored a set of recommendations for an Urban Policy Working Group appointed by the US Department of Housing and Urban Development as a chapter in a report to then president Carter. Then in May Thomas was a member of a "teach in" responding the unrest of camps following the Mariel boatlift of Cuban refugees.

In 1981 the Thomas' were present for the 50th anniversary of Louhelen Baháʼí School and the return of Magdalene Carney. June was then an associate professor in the Department of Urban Studies at Cleveland State University and both were on unpaid leave from MSU. That year the Thomas' guest edited and wrote parts of a special issue of Catalyst magazine entitled "The State of the Black Community in Capitalist America". They co-wrote the introduction and June wrote one of the articles. This issue was published as one of the few that year for various challenges in the magazine. In 1982 June joined the MSU fault as an associate professor in the Urban Planning and Urban Affairs Programs which continued into 1995. In October 1983 Thomas presented on "The Black Church and Trade Unionism: 1925-1941" at the 68th Annual Meeting of the Association for the Study of Afro-American Life and History. Thomas was also visible giving a 30 minute talk at the 9th Association of Baháʼí Studies (ABS) conference that Fall. In it Thomas speaks on Shoghi Effendi's statements and punctuates it with comments of history dwelling at some length on the requirements Shoghi Effendi specified for the "new race of men" – a high sense of moral rectitude, absolute chastity, and complete freedom from prejudice. The first was emphasized on the leaders of the religion. The second was pointed out to the youth especially. The third was specifically addressed to all Baháʼís, since racial prejudice had attacked the American society – the "most vital and challenging issue". Thomas credited Shoghi Effendi's correct view of the challenge of racism in America from afar and was punctuated by riots and struggles in American society since then. Thomas called the work unprecedented and "sharply contrasted" to the race-ideas common in America. He underscored that Baháʼís had resolved matters among them they could demonstrate it to the wider society – that the "double crusade" was still the work to be done and that Baháʼís would face misunderstanding, misconstrued goals, be scorned, belittled, undermined, deserted from time to time, but that criticism reinforced the spread of awareness, unpopularity strengthened the contrast, and ostracism actually attracts some. Also in 1984 Thomas co-wrote a paper "The State of Black Detroit: Building from Strength, the Black Self-help Tradition in Detroit" which was published in a couple of books. And, last for 1984, Thomas contributed a chapter to a book Circle of Unity published by a Baháʼí associated publishing house. The overall text generated a lot of discussion, sometimes heated. In 1985 Thomas spoke at the 10th ABS conference.

In 1986 Thomas was part of a panel at a Baháʼí peace conference in San Francisco, and contributed a paper "Promoting Unity in a Multi-racial society" to the next ABS meeting. Thomas was later noted as a co-founder of Fathers, Inc. in Detroit in 1986 along with John Mangum Jr and Marvin Hughes. The organization was the initiative of John Magnum, former policeman, as a response to the goal of the Baháʼí Six Year Plan calling for "a greater involvement of the Faith in the life of society" starting with Mangum's own children and adding cousins and friends until it reached some 40 young people and incorporated as a non-profit in 1989.

==== Professor ====
===== On Detroit and the gathering theme of "The Other Tradition" =====
In 1987 Thomas co-wrote Detroit: Race and Uneven Development via Temple University Press, and was reviewed positively as a portrayal of the difficulties Detroit suffered particularly since 1952, (a separate revisit to the subject was published in 2013 via Michigan State University Press.) That same year Billy Roberts, then an Auxiliary Board member of the Baháʼí Faith, a mid-lower level administrative position, and later member of the National Assembly, observed that, to his view, few black men were visible participating in local and regional leadership among Baháʼís. He called for a meeting of black Baháʼí men to see about ways of enlivening black men participating in the community more. Eleven men met him in Greensboro, NC, in late October 1987. This was the start of the Black Men's Group. John Mangum, Richard Thomas, and Marvin Hughes drove together to the Greensboro meeting. In the summer of 1988 a larger group met at Louis Gregory Institute and in 1998 it was moved to Green Acre. It was cathartic and dedicative and met annually to assist the activity of black men in the Baháʼí community. In 1988 the MSU Baháʼí club sponsored a talk for Black history month. and June spoke at a spring meeting of the club. And a couple weeks later Thomas was part of a panel sponsored by the club, as part of a campus "Cross cultural week".

Thomas' talks on race-issues awareness in scholarly and Baháʼí circles continued. In 1989 Thomas gave a day-long seminar on inter-cultural issues before the start of the 14th annual ABS conference. The 1990 15th ABS conference invited papers for presenting on "Models of racial unity" and Thomas was the convener to whom papers could be sent. In December 1990 Thomas was among the featured speakers at the sixth annual Grand Canyon Baháʼí Conference in Phoenix, Arizona, which some 1900 Baháʼís attended. In Feb 1991 Thomas was among the presenters at the North Shore Race Unity Task Force coalition in Evanston and Wilmette, Illinois, with the theme "Weekend for Racial Unity". Thomas was interviewed by Vernon Jarrett on his program the week before the conference, and was cosponsored to open the conference presentations at Northwestern University describing his forthcoming book Racial Unity: An Imperative for Social Progress by the African American Studies Department. The book includes the first reference to the term "The Other Tradition", akin to the idea of Anti-racism, and a revised edition was published in 1993. This Task Force in Chicago had arisen in February 1990 when four Baháʼís from northern Illinois met. Intervening years had had increasing levels of action in the community. The group had most recently aided the city win an award from the National Association of Town Watch, the sponsors of National Night Out, and the Task Force was recognized by the Evanston Police Department for their efforts. The conference also held a panel discussion on "Racial Unity: Models That Work" including Thomas. The weekend's final event was a talk by Thomas at the Wilmette Baháʼí House of Worship entitled "An Agenda for Racial Unity and World Peace," drew an audience of about 200, many of whom had attended the other events that weekend.

There were about 75 Baháʼís in the area around Lansing in 1991. In June Ali Manning Thomas, son of Richard and June, won an international scholarship going to Japan. In October Thomas was a principal speaker at the fourth session of a Black-Jewish conference at MSU detailing the Jewish involvement in the civil rights movement, in the defense of the Scottsboro Boys, and the relationship between Thurgood Marshall and Jackson Greenberg.

In 1992 Thomas published Life for Us is what We Make it: Building Black Community in Detroit, 1915–1945. It was a revised and updated work based on his PhD thesis, called "ambitious" though it also had numerous errors according to a review as well as not following the standard thought on black history of using proletarianization as an organizing principle, though Thomas was an early scholar in the subject, and now focused on community building, instead, as the basis of analysis. However others found it very worthwhile, though sometimes too prone to rhetoric and limited engagement of other interests in the progress of the times. That year the Thomas' were also noted attending the Baháʼí World Congress. A year later Thomas contributed to a series of monthly meetings held by Baháʼís from Detroit and Grosse Pointe, Michigan, with a talk "Overcoming Racial Prejudice: Baháʼí and Other Working Models". Thomas published a revised edition of Racial Unity: An Imperative for Social Progress through the Association of Baháʼí Studies in 1993. In November Will C. van den Hoonaard used it as a reference in a race unity and racism draft for an encyclopedic article, and called it the "best analysis of factors that contribute to racial unity, integrating Baháʼí and non-Baháʼí perspectives". Another review was published in 1997. June was noted at a discussion of city planning integrating her scholarly and Baháʼí-based ideas.

In January 1994 Thomas' Life for Us is what We Make it was briefly reviewed in the local newspaper, and in May Thomas was among a panel of Baháʼís invited to a show on WLNS-TV. In 1995 June was a full professor at MSU (up to 2007).

===== More on the "other tradition" =====
1996 opened with Thomas' book Understanding interracial unity: a study of U.S. race relations published through SAGE Publications as part of two academic series: Sage series on race and ethnic relations and the Sage Yearbooks in Women's Policy Studies. The text received mixed reviews in a number of journals. Later that year the Universal House of Justice asked groups of Baháʼís to go to places around the world – such as African Americans to Africa; 9 members of the Black Men's Group(BMG) went in 1997 to Namibia and other places and successively beyond Africa each year and much of the time a 3 day stay at the Baháʼí World Center afterwards. After starting with 9 participants they ended with 53 the last year of that practice. 1996 was also the beginning of the implementation of the Multi-Racial Unity Living Experience (MRULE) project, partly as a response to the tensions raised following the OJ Simpson trial/verdict in Oct 1995. Thomas was approached by then provost Lou Anna Simon of MSU to have a means of resolving racial tensions in the midst of increasing diversity on campus. There were indeed riots on campus in several years to come.

In 1997 a chapter by Thomas was published in Social justice philanthropy published by JAI Press entitled "The role of the American Baháʼí community in addressing racial injustice and racial disunity". The text is a broad review of nonprofit support for social justice and highlights the contribution and complexities of religious institutions in that light. Thomas mentions quickly the Antislavery movement of the Quakers, Mahatma Gandhi's Satyagraha, and its inspiration to Martin Luther King Jr. He then draws attention to the Baháʼí Faith's priority of justice as a core spiritual principle and details specific instances in Baháʼí history on the activities of Baháʼís in this area both locally and administratively, by leadership and individuals and in ways to keep the black population highlighted still in the then current iteration of the initiatives of the community and facing the subsequent resurgent racism in society responded to by the revised national and international institutions speaking out on the issue. The same year June came out with her own book, Redevelopment and Race: Planning a Finer City in Postwar Detroit. Also since 1997, (and to 2011,) Both June and Richard Thomas had often been elected annually to the Regional Baháʼí Council of what was at first called the Central States and later called the Regional Baháʼí Council for the Great Lakes States. June's father Hubert V. Manning also died in 1997, and June was named Director of the Urban and Regional Planning Program M.S.U. (to 2000.)

1998 seems to have been quiet for the Thomas' – but in 1999 June was named Director of the Urban Collaborators Program at MSU Extension (to 2001,) and Thomas was the Hasan M. Balyuzi Memorial Lecturer for the ABS conference. The next year Thomas taught a series of classes on racial unity for the Wilmette Institute.

2000 was another quiet year of public comment on the Thomas'. In 2001 June was named Co-Director of the Urban Collaborators Program, MSU Extension (MSUE), and Co-Director of Urban Planning Partnerships, an outreach initiative. Thomas published in article "Interracial and Multiracial unity movements in the US: Models of World Peace", in World Order magazine, and Gavel's PhD reviewing the MRULE projects with Thomas as her thesis committee lead was accomplished.

In 2002 a Lansing newspaper article profiled the poetry of Thomas and another "Richard" at MSU. That year Thomas also came out with another book, Bridging Racial Divides in Michigan's Urban Communities, "develop(ing) a historical analysis of selected organizations and groups involved in bridging racial divides in two highly racially segregated metropolitan communities: the Detroit Metropolitan and the Benton Harbor/St. Joseph communities." That year June's mother Ethel A. Manning died in September.

In 2003 Thomas was noted on the dissertation committee of Wilbert Jenkins about post-Civil War Charleston, SC, and was inspirational to a master's degree student at MSU extending the review and work of MRULE.

Another World Order edition in 2004 included articles from Thomas and June each. Thomas also visited NAACP officials and the Seacoast African-American Cultural Center near Green Acre Baháʼí School for the centenary of the Treaty of Portsmouth in 1905 that ended the Russo-Japanese War "to discuss Building Multi-Racial Communities."

In 2005 scholar Christopher Buck noted Thomas' interest in documenting the contributions of early black Baháʼí Alain Locke. Thomas also was recorded giving a talk based on a paper in Haifa, Israel, possibly during pilgrimage. The paper reviewed the circumstances of early black Baháʼís. Thomas' text Understanding Interracial Unity had been used in some courses at MSU and with MRULE one observer thought change in race relations was proceeding at MSU and some courses focused on Baháʼí inputs to the issue as well. Thomas also served in the Wilmette Institute, a Baháʼí study institution founded in 1995 to provide classes on the religion that has moved to a largely online study approach of some 50 courses for thousands of students from approaching 100 countries.

In 2006 June worked in the Planners of Color Interest Group project and then was founding co-chair, in its organization as part of ACSP (Association of Collegiate Schools of Planning), while Lights of the Spirit: Historical Portraits of Black Baháʼís in North America, 1898–2004, came out the long mentioned text reviewing many early black Baháʼís to which Thomas was a contributing co-editor and wrote three chapters;

- Introduction to the Baháʼí Faith, pp. 5–18
- The "Pupil of the Eye": African-Americans and the Making of the American Baháʼí Community, pp. 19–48
- Spreading the divine fragrances: African-American Baháʼís in the Global Expansion of the Baháʼí Faith, 1937–1963 pp. 95–121

That year Thomas also published a review of The Last War – Racism, Spirituality, and the Future of Civilization which he thought was on its way to being a classic in the field of the scholarly review of racism and the need for presenting spirituality in academic circles.

In 2007 June was named Centennial Professor of the Urban and Regional Planning Program at the University of Michigan. At MSU Thomas contributed to a book The State of black Michigan, 1967–2007. and his poetry was anthologized by Amiri Baraka and Larry Neal.

Thomas was on the planning committee for the second "Black religion & spirituality in the 21st century" in Nov 2007 at MSU, and held a session featuring the book Lights of the spirit: historical portraits of black Baháʼís in North America, 1898–2004.

In 2007 Thomas and June joined son Ali in a letter to editor of the Annals of Internal Medicine about racism in medical practice.

Thomas was part of a panel discussion, the "Second Annual Louis Gregory Symposium on Race Unity", at Huston-Tillotson University sponsored by the Baháʼís of Austin, Austin Area Interreligious Ministries, Huston-Tillotson University, and the Student Government Association in 2008.

In 2009 Thomas contributed a talk for Black history month with a recorded presentation at Grand Rapids Community College commenting on the election of President Obama. Thomas cooperated in an October 2010 conference co-sponsored and organized by ABS and the Office of Communications of the National Spiritual Assembly of the United States held at Louhelen Baháʼí School.

=== Retired academic and active Baháʼí ===
In 2011-2 Thomas retired from MSU, then living in Ypsilanti. He was still a PhD advisor directly and indirectly. MRULE was studied at MSU as well.

In 2012 Thomas appeared on the radio show The Takeaway interviewed by Celeste Headlee on "The Other Tradition" theme for a conference on race unity with William Smith and the role of "amity". Then Thomas took part in the Wilmette Institute course Social Action and Public Discourse. That year a BMG history was published. It lasted 25 years as a national Baháʼí organization with the goal of raising up black men for service in the religion. The annual meeting of the group grew to 200, started having to limit attendance, and then devolved regionalized meetings. In 2012 the international governing body of the Baháʼís, the Universal House of Justice, commended the fact that black men had been energized and could localize the process and ended the national group.

In 2013 June was president Association of Collegiate Schools of Planning (after being a rising officer since 2011,) and Thomas co-wrote Detroit: Race Riots, Racial Conflicts, and Efforts to Bridge the Racial Divide.

Thomas gave a talk for the Civic, Literary, and Mutual Aid Associations in Detroit in 2013, and was plenary speaker for the ABS meeting.

A video interview with Richard Thomas was done at the ABS conference in 2013 "about scholarship, learning, and action in the field of race relations." Thomas also had a book published Communication and Disenfranchisement: Social Health Issues and Implications. Thomas and Joe Darden presented on black history and riots in Detroit for the African American and African Studies section at MSU, and a documentary on BMG released.

In 2014 Thomas was noted supporting black women scholarship, was given an award by the Michigan historical society, and presented at the National Conference on Race Amity Forum.

In 2015 Thomas gave a talk at the Ann Arbor Washtenaw Community College on "The Other Tradition" theme.

In 2017 Thomas appeared with his co-writer on several projects, Joe Darden, at the Association of American Geographers, and also published a review of Louis Venters No Jim Crow Church: The Origins of South Carolina's Baháʼí Community. He made a presentation on the BMG, and was videotaped as part of a Baháʼí review of struggling with issues of racism about a university-wide discussion program to teach acceptance of diversity to college faculty and students.

== Projects ==
Across Thomas' life he's also engaged in particular acts of service in various circumstances.

- In 1964 Thomas took part project run from Louhelen Baháʼí School for a Baháʼí community of Greenville, S.C., which was integrating its schools that Fall.
- Serving during his rising presence at MSU

In 1969 as a MSU senior Thomas co-founded a black aid program on campus. In 1979 Thomas was an associate professor of racial and ethnic studies and was part of the department's new program in the study of human rights including black history and persecution.

- Thomas was a co-founder of Fathers, Inc. in Detroit in 1986.
- Multi-Racial Living Experience (MRULE)

1996 was the beginning of the implementation of the Multi-Racial Unity Living Experience(MRULE) project. Thomas co-established the MRULE project following the OJ Simpson trial/verdict in Oct 1995. Thomas was approached by then provost Lou Anna Simon of MSU to have a means of resolving racial tensions in the midst of increasing diversity on campus. Thomas brought in Jeanne Gazel, a current graduate student and their small consulting business. MRULE then began to evolve as it ran in the residence halls and introduced the basic concept of the organic oneness of humanity, tools for discussion-based engagement, and multiple degrees from studying the process. Gavel's PhD reviewing the MRULE projects with Thomas as her thesis committee lead was finished in 2001 as well as inspiring parallel research elsewhere.

- The Other Tradition – the history of the interracial struggle for racial justice, unity, love, and fellowship.

Thomas has done scholarly work on a theme he named "The Other Tradition" after many years of teaching issues of race. He had been teaching race relations at MSU such as a class "Racism and ethnocentrism". After about 15 years of teaching the class he was concerned about dejected students and uncovered instances of cooperation and respect across the races that he felt was not being documented. He also felt scholars had focused on the violence and oppression to the exclusion of instances of cooperation. He first specifically began to entertain the work in 1981 at a conference at the University of Warwick where he offered a paper on interracial groups that formed after riots in Detroit noting in particular the fluidity in racial connections – and also met with resistance that such groups formed. He observed that fellow scholars and students in classes did not believe actual instances of interracial cooperation which lead him to contribute a chapter in Detroit: Race and Uneven Development from 1987. He "felt compelled to include the history of "The Other Tradition" of American race relations, namely: the history of the interracial struggle for racial justice, unity, love, and fellowship. People needed to know, I reasoned, both the history of racism and the history of those who have struggled against racism and have envisioned a social order in which people not only accept each other as equal but also have a profound appreciation of each other as members of the one human family." Racial Unity: An Imperative for Social Progress from 1991 and revised in 1993, was the first publication to use the term "The Other Tradition". In this theme, Thomas includes mention of Bacon's Rebellion, black and white soldiers during the American Revolutionary War on the side of Britain, Abolitionism in the United States, black and white cooperation in the Underground Railroad, John Brown, black and white soldiers during the American Civil War, the Grimké sisters, the period of Knights of Labor and the general Reconstruction Era, the NAACP, the Baháʼí Faith, interracial coalition building in the democratic party, The Communist Party USA and African Americans, Highlander Folk School, Southern Conference for Human Welfare, and the Educational Fund it developed, the Church for the Fellowship of All Peoples, the Civil Rights Movement, the "Beloved Community" of Martin Luther King Jr., Freedom Summer and the various freedom marches, the Detroit organization of "Focus Hope", and MRULE. Some reviewers of Understanding interracial unity: a study of U.S. race relations noted Thomas ignored the question of the effectiveness of efforts of interracial unity. One saw that and noticed Thomas saw increasing racism since the 1970s, and his effort was aimed at showcasing examples of people who worked for unity and "a tradition of courageous struggle for racial justice" and working in a similar vein to other works though perhaps misjudging the virtue of protests. Another noted the question of effectiveness as well as the call for a critical mass multiracial group could "break the cycle of racial polarization and fragmentation" and noted institutions Thomas documented that contributed to interracial justice and unity but wanted more development of the cases and that the overall subject needs a broader grasp than individualist and psychology which could reach towards being effective. A couple briefer reviews noted the work as the "first in a decade" on the subject, and honest. Thomas also acknowledged he did not speak to the effectiveness of the efforts.

== Publications ==
- Black poetry

- Anthologized in Nine Black Poets in 1968.
- Anthologized in A galaxy of black writing in 1970.
- Anthologized in The Third Coast in 1977.
- Anthologized in Black Fire: An Anthology of Afro-American Writing in 2007.

- Black studies

- Master's thesis on Carter G. Woodson.

- Blacks in Detroit

- PhD thesis From peasant to proletarian: The formation and organization of the black industrial working class in Detroit, 1915–1945
- A chapter of Blacks and Chicanos in Urban Michigan
- Thomas co-wrote a paper "The State of Black Detroit: Building from Strength, the Black Self-help Tradition in Detroit" which was published in two books.
- A chapter of Detroit: Race and Uneven Development and was revised
- Life for Us is what We Make it: Building Black Community in Detroit, 1915–1945
- A race relations lecture in 2014 about life after the 1967 Detroit riot.

- Blacks in Michigan

- Bridging Racial Divides in Michigan's Urban Communities
- Co-wrote The State of black Michigan, 1967–2007 published in 2007 by MSU Press.
- Co-wrote a chapter in Communication and Disenfranchisement: Social Health Issues and Implications

- About blacks, race issues, and the Baháʼí Faith

- Contributed a chapter to a book Circle of Unity
- Racial Unity: An Imperative for Social Progress from work done in 1991 and a revised edition was published in 1993
- A chapter published in Social justice philanthropy entitled "The role of the American Baháʼí community in addressing racial injustice and racial disunity".
- Lights of the Spirit: Historical Portraits of Black Baháʼís in North America, 1898–2004
- The Story of the Baháʼí Black Men's Gathering Celebrating Twenty-Five Years, 1987–2011

- The Other Tradition

- Racial Unity: An Imperative for Social Progress was the first publication to use the term "The Other Tradition".
- Understanding interracial unity: a study of U.S. race relations

- Autobiographical: "Bahá'í Teachings on Racial Unity: Influences on My Academic Career" in The Baha'i Faith in African American Studies, Lexington Books, 2023.

- Emeritus

- Richard Walter Thomas (Jul 13, 2023). Abdu'l Baha: Pioneer in Anti-racism, Racial Unity, and Cultural Diversity. Abdu'l Baha at Stanford: A Centennial Conference (YouTube). San Francisco, CA: Stanford Iranian Studies Program.

== See also ==
- History of African Americans in Detroit
- Baháʼí Faith and the unity of humanity
- "The Other Tradition, Bellingham (Washington) Racial History Timelines". Western Washington University. 2021.
