= Marion Holley =

American high jumper

Marion Holley Hofman

Marion E. Holley (later Hofman, May 17, 1910 – December 15, 1995) was a US track and field athlete who competed in the 1928 Summer Olympics as a high jumper and went on to many years of service in the Baháʼí Faith.

Raised in Visalia, California, Holley excelled academically and athletically at Stanford University, where she was a member of the debate club, a pianist, and a standout athlete. During her studies at Stanford, Holley competed at the 1928 Summer Olympics, placing 9th in the high jump category.

After graduating with honors, Holley experienced a spiritual transformation, formally embracing the Baháʼí Faith in 1932. She became a pioneering leader in Baháʼí youth work across the United States, contributing to major Baháʼí publications and helping develop programs at Baháʼí schools.

In 1945, she married David Hofman and moved to the UK, where she served in national Baháʼí institutions and managed the George Ronald publishing company. Later, she supported her husband’s work with the Universal House of Justice in Haifa. Holley remained active in Baháʼí service and education until her death in London in 1995.

== Early days ==
Born May 17, 1910, Marion Elizabeth Holley Hofman was the first child of Grace Bruckman and Harry Holley living in Visalia, California. Bruckman was a Leland Stanford Junior University graduate and while there was a social organizer and a violinist. In 1905, Bruckman was employed as an assistant in the Physics Department. Harry was a successful waterworks civil engineer active in Tulare County from circa 1900 through 1963. Harry and Grace married on July 2, 1906 and lived in Visalia, CA Harry was employed from 1917 by the Kaweah and St. John's River associations during some court battles over river management. There is very little about the family or Marion before her college years.

Mother Grace and daughter learned of the Baháʼí Faith from about 1917 from Disciple of ʻAbdu'l-Bahá Isabella D. Brittingham. Brittingham was in Portland Oregon in 1917, had been there before, and had a residence in Santa Barbara in 1918. Grace was secretary of the Visalia Baháʼí Spiritual Assembly in 1925, the year of its first election.

== Youth ==
Holley had experiences in college such that she lost her faith in God and encountered some kind of crisis, as commented on by Baháʼí sources. The details are not clear, but after her college career, she wrote of the challenges that youth face. Certainly, she was popular and her academic success was not just in sports, though the public commentary about her college career was remarkable because of her sports achievements. She followed her mother, attending Stanford University.

=== Stanford ===
==== 1926–27 freshman year ====
Holley attended her mother's alma mater, Leland Stanford Junior University, starting in the fall of 1926, when she was 16 years old.

She was noted in the school newspaper as active in the Stanford women's debate team. Her team's position, already in the lead among the audience before the debate, increased its lead after. She studied social sciences at Stanford but it was not commented on by the public coverage of her career.

Though there is a lack of coverage on her sports activities up to this point, in the spring freshman semester at Stanford Holley was a named member of the women's all-star basketball team. This is the first sign of her athletic career that could characterize most of her college career as documented in the newspapers. That year she was also accepted by the Delta Delta Delta sorority. She was also in the Women's Glee Club concert broadcast on KFRC as part of an instrumental trio playing the piano to Drigo's "Serenade". In May Holley broke records in the running broad jump as it was called then called, and high jump.

==== 1927–28 sophomore year ====
With the announcement of women's participation in the 1928 Olympics, coverage of women sports activities at Stanford increased, and Holley was one of those whose achievements were taken more and more note of. At 17 at her first meet of the sophomore year she won the 50-yard dash, high jump and team relay race for the Northern California Athletic Club. Soon after, she tied in the high jump, set a campus record in the hop step and jump, and in an event in October came behind another in the high jump because she set a new world record. Holley was also the sophomore field hockey captain.

In February Holley was named to a committee that managed a three-college meet that year held at Stanford. For the event Holley was a sports official for the basketball events. It was also announced she would train for the Olympics. Richard Templeton was her coach. She also played as the forward of the sophomore women's basketball team, and was the basketball manager for the teams. She was noted representing Stanford in a track meet in March, and in April was recognized as one of five women to try-out to join the Stanford Daily student newspaper. Holley also attended exhibition fundraising for the Olympics. In May Holley set a new record for throwing a basketball on campus and then went on to a weekend meet.

Holley was nominated for the Women's Athletics Association (WAA) Board vice-presidency in the spring semester and won.

Holley set a new Stanford high-jump record that summer, and made the 1928-9 all-star track team for Stanford but was not a point leader in overall sports achievement. That summer Holley was also elected to the campus "Women's 'S' Society".

Holley took third place in the regional trials for the Olympics in the high jump though she had improved her height 2" at the meet. The list of contenders for the final Olympic trials was trimmed among fundraising limits to 20 in June and the Pacific teams headed to Newark, NJ for the American finals. She tied for second place in the high jump there, passing the trials, to join the American Olympic team in July.

Ultimately she placed 9th in the high jump at the Olympics held in Amsterdam, Holland. She was photographed with Doris Metcalf, and Rose Mallor. See also Women at the Olympics. She returned aboard the S S President Roosevelt, Aug 22, 1928.

==== 1928–29 junior year ====
At the junior year at Stanford in November, Holley was the field hockey junior team center forward. She also joined the 3rd annual student session of the Institute of Pacific Relations among the 25 delegates. The group discussed racism towards far-eastern Orientals. Despite not being active in the college club of Baháʼís or their meetings, Holley was listed in the Bahaʼi World directory of contacts.

In January Holley was elected captain of the juniors basketball team, one of four block 'S' lettered women, and was on the All-Star basketball team, as well as the Junior Class team. Holley was elected president of WAA and was a delegate to the nation conference of the organization. While there she presented a paper on how the Olympics connect with women's athletics in college, and co-led a discussion as part of the Sixth Annual Athletic Conference of American College Women (ACACW) when it had opposed women further participating in the Olympics with a result of the ACACW changing the position. Holley was again on the tri-college meet committee a week later. In the meet of juniors and freshmen Holly won the 50 and 100 yard dash, the high jump, and the running broad jump, (out of 11 events total.) Holley was then named to the New Gymnasium Committee, (later named "Roble Gymnasium Building".) The plans for the new gymnasium for women had been submitted for approval and the 1929-30 committee would advance the work for a new women's gym. In the May, inter-class meet Holley was the overall high-point winner while breaking the campus record in the broad jump she had set herself, winning three first places on her own and being on the winning team of the relay. She won the 100 yard dash, 100 yard low hurdles, and running broad jump. Though the seniors won the overall standing the news lead that Holley broke three campus records in the final inter-class meet of the year, in running broad jump, basketball throw, and 100 yard dash. She was the individual point champion making the highest points possible. Over the same period Holley also addressed a discussion of the women's gymnasium in the campus newspaper co-writing a letter-to-the-editor defending the progress made in getting a new gym for women. She continued to serve advocating for the new gym into May. And as president of the WAA, Holley and her appointed team of people updated the WAA handbook following the revision of the election procedures for the organization, (so now the looser for president automatically becomes vice-president.)

The Holleys had a guest in the summer of 1929 - Holley's roommate Joyce Lyon (later Dahl) was invited to Visalia and their high Sierra cabin, after both Lyon and the Holleys went to the 3rd Geyserville Baháʼí School, a precursor of Bosch Baháʼí School, and the family exchanged Christmas gifts for the end of 1929 (or 1930.)

Though Baháʼís were visible in the campus newspaper, and the club existed across several of her years there, she never appeared associated with the Baháʼís on campus. She was listed in the Bahaʼi World directory as attending Stanford for 1928-9.

==== Senior year ====
Things changed significantly in her senior year of 1929-1930. In the fall of 1929, Holley arranged to do a year of advanced work at the University of California at Berkeley in anthropology with Professor Edward Winslow Gifford. She was not mentioned in any 1930 sports coverage or thereafter, save for contributing to a report recommending the Olympic games for women; the committee suggested that better health conditions and opportunities for meeting socially with other athletes be allowed. She was back at Stanford in the fall of 1930. She was admitted to the Phi Beta Kappa honor society in November 1930, and finished as part of the Stanford class of 1930. Sources say she finished her Stanford degree summa or magna cum laude.

=== After college ===
==== Crisis ====
Though home from college, and elected to the Spiritual Assembly of Visalia, she felt agnostic and alienation from the Baháʼí Faith. During this time her family was visited by leading Baháʼí women Martha Root and Keith Ransom-Kehler. Root was in the San Francisco area in the fall/winter of 1930-1 before going to the Geyserville Baháʼí School in January 1931, while Ransom-Kehler left for a world-wide trip from San Francisco in the early winter of 1931-2. Though Ransom-Kehler did not specifically discuss the religion with her, Ransom-Kehler gave many talks per week, and Holley gained an intellectual appreciation for the religion and re-declared to the Pasadena Baháʼí Spiritual Assembly in early 1932. In another year, Holley would begin writing in part about the difficulties youth faced.

==== Activity ====
In June 1932 it was announced Holley was a committee member for producing the Baháʼí World volume 5. To it she contributed the article "A new cycle of human power", saying, "…whether the evidence is small or great, local or universal, it indicates an attitude which has pervaded our society - an attitude minimizing the possibilities of the spiritual, or, if you prefer, disregarding those non-material values which contribute so profoundly to character". She ends by underscoring the "challenge which demands investigation… For what right does any man walk abroad, and call himself a citizen of the world, if be not cognizant of its condition and enamored of its promise?"

In August Holley was chair of the multi-religious commission of the World Council of Youth as a representative of the US Baháʼí National Assembly. It met at the California Institute of Technology organized by the Youth Division of the Olympic Games and the Junior Council of International Relations of Southern California with the intention of making it a regular part of the Olympics. Four sud-divisions formed - history, international understanding, future activity, and the place of religion in the world. Baháʼís were themselves explicitly mentioned. Holley herself wrote an article about the meeting for the Baháʼí periodical Star of the West, printed in October, and referred to it as "a mental counterpart of the Olympic Games", and that it included three Baháʼís. She summarized the conclusions of the group saying they arrived at an understanding of a shared core teachings of religions but a diverse and obstructive secondary aspect dividing religions - its social laws and the problem of confusing form with fundamentals. They also arrived a five point list of the needs of modern religion: religion must satisfy the intellect, religion must aid the development of culture, religion must strive to abolish prejudices and rivalries, religion must increase humanitarian activities while developing spiritual life to avoid being too-absorbed in alleviating suffering, and religion must cultivate recreation and a balanced life between body and spirit. Another article on the event was done by Nellie French, who noted the age limit of 30 year-old for participants. In the December issue of World Unity Magazine, another article by Holley reviewing the meeting appeared saying in part “Unorthodox youth, international and organized, has for the first time in unremembered years rallied to religion.” In answer to a letter by French about the Council meeting Shoghi Effendi, then head of the Baháʼí Faith, wrote in part “The activities, hopes and ideals (of youth) are close and dear to my heart. Upon them rests the supreme and challenging responsibility…. Theirs is a mighty task, at once holy, stupendous and enthralling.” In November Holley's article of her experience later at Geyserville Baháʼí School was published.

In early 1933 it was published in Baháʼí News Holley was a member of the new national youth group-cum-committee formed by the National Spiritual Assembly of the United States in consultation with Shoghi Effendi - in fact mother Grace and daughter Marion were both on the committee and Marion was the secretary. Holley presented the report of the Youth Committee to the national Baháʼí convention in April. She reported the agreed on goals of the committee on youth activities was to 1) educate themselves and 2) educate their contacts. For local youth groups the committee also underscored the need for elasticity of organization and suggested a method of focus - an informal gathering for discussion of youth under a chair and gradually draw the group towards a systematic study of the Baháʼí teachings - and that a course be taught to train individuals in this approach. After her and Mary Maxwell's presentations (some four years before Maxwell's marriage to Shoghi Effendi,) the youth separated to their own meeting and later returned to the general convention with a contribution towards the building of the Baháʼí Temple. The summer of 1933 Holley was a faculty at the Pacific Coast Baháʼí School held in Geyserville and was still living in Visalia, CA. and an article she contributed to Star of the West was published in which she spoke of the chaos youth are facing: “They cannot cement a defunct family tie, outline a normal ethics, or steer bizarre night life into the channels of sane recreation” and refers to the recent dinner held at the national convention with youth speaking with a depth of heart and attachment to Shoghi Effendi. An August 1933 letter of Shoghi Effendi directed that the youth committee seek a broad international body of active youth to help "spread the Holy Word”. In later 1933 Holley became a contributing editor to Star of the West.

In January 1934 Holley contributed an article of an interview with Norman Thomas to Star of the West. Thomas was a socialist candidate for president in 1932. In March Holley attended the 7th annual conference of the Los Angeles Girls' Council about coping with the changing world - her talk was entitled 'Religion'. In May the report of the youth committee including Holley was published in Baháʼí News. It included a recommendation modeled on the World Youth Council of “informal discussion groups for strangers, organized about some inquiry such as “The place of religion in society.” It also suggested a census be taken of youth to see about filling requests for presenters on the religion and a national campaign be based on national issues, as well as attention to the progress of youth into roles of active mature responsibility. The youth committee had asked assemblies to appoint local youth to committees "not over 25 years of age" and initiated contacts with some 15 Baháʼí youth groups in other countries and 17 groups in America in preparation for a survey the results of which would be for inclusion in Baháʼí World volume 5 and also was promised 3 articles by youth in it. In January letters were sent to the local groups outlining the plan for a campaign of 6 weeks to publicize the religion. In February, a letter asking for names of people 15 to 21 who might be subject to being drafted and to be a means for Assemblies to approve their status as public speakers of the religion. The committee submitted an outline of a class as a suggestion for assemblies for their youth. The committee was also working on a youth newsletter, a specific program at Green Acre Baháʼí School while members supported all three schools, and coordination with youth newsletters in Australia and Hawaii. That summer Holley was also faculty at the Louhelen Baháʼí School teaching a course in effective leadership in the 4 day youth conference. It was also published that Holley continued to work on the Baháʼí World committee. Holley also kept up a column in the weekly Pasadena Star by Nellie S. French when she was away in Europe during the summer, as well as being among the public speakers for the religion in Los Angeles during the year. That Fall an update pointed out Holley was the committee's secretary and now living in Glendale, CA. Holley published part 1 of an article in Star of the West in October reviewing the dark social context into which the Báb appeared. Communities of youth working for the promulgation of the religion were excited but struggled with the age limit. The committee highlighted the example of success as the Montreal Youth Group. The endeavors of the youth committee were again encouraged on behalf of Shoghi Effendi saying in part to “create a new spirit of service, and of common devotion to the Cause among young and intelligent Baháʼís…." During the year Holley also listed Holley among the speakers at the Baháʼí House of Worship in the year.

During 1934 Marion's mother grew ill and would not be visible in Baháʼí activities though she would live another 30 years. And Holley worked with May Maxwell and was much affected by her - seeing a unity of spiritual and intellectual contributions to life in action - resulting in Holley speaking of May Maxwell as her spiritual mother. It was also through Maxwell that Holley met her future husband and they began to correspond long distance.

In the summer of 1935 new pamphlet by Holley was listed available in Baháʼí News - The Most Great Peace - and Holley chaired a meeting of Baháʼís at the California Pacific International Exposition. In later 1935 the overall sized of the youth committee was increased and its basis also regionalized - with Holley secretary of the Pacific coast group. This regionalization was so that members could more directly support local youth groups and address their problems as well as foster regional youth conferences and was felt more in line with the guidance of Shoghi Effendi. The youth committee report for 1935 noted Holley as its overall secretary and that there were 43 localities in America that could be reached where youth lived, with 30 organized groups with them, and 49 other localities around the world. Among the regional groups mentioned in the report was one for northern and southern California that succeeded best with inter-group cooperation and a Naw-Rúz celebration marked by youth from sixteen countries participating, a youth group was forming to assist the Geyserville school, and assemblies were being asked to sponsor youth delegates for each region for its school's youth program. The newsletter Baháʼí Youth had begun in December 1935 to be published quarterly. And there was news of teams of youth to promulgate the religion in Los Angeles and San Francisco and that some committee members had now moved abroad. Overall some 200 youth between 15 and 21 years of age had been identified though only six had actually registered with assemblies in order to serve on local committees. The expanded committee included Holley's future husband David Hofman.

Holley received a letter from Shoghi Effendi in Feb 1936 commending the new publication Gleanings from the Writings of Baháʼu'lláh hoping it “will enable (youth) to gain a fuller consciousness of their functions and responsibilities, and to arise and set the example…”

The Baháʼí World volume 6 committee reported in the spring of 1936 that it felt the need to address the idea that communities didn't need keep materials in preparation for volume 7 already started and communities were bound to preserve records of activities that could be included in the reports, as well as a request contributors add transliteration marks on their own so committee members didn't have to, that two copies of printed matter be presented, to the committee and that the work of getting submissions has to be timely for the volume to be finished on time. Volume 6 was published in 1937 and included an article by Holley, “The 'Most Great Peace; a new phase of human thought”. It also included the details of the survey of Baháʼí youth: “Youth activities through the Bahá'í World; an estimate and survey of international events 1934-1936”, written by her.

==== Youth survey ====
She noted that the survey was of necessity incomplete because of barriers of language and space. She named the first standard Bahá'í youth had to live up to as character in order to fulfill the work asked and that it had been previously neglected or overlooked or a feeling of shyness of being visible distinct had to be set aside. She named the qualities of character sought for as giving up intoxicants, presenting virtues in general and chastity in particular and of love. She then named the second standard for youth to strive for - the universality of oneness - and that achieving it in practice for the committee was a challenge and not usually obvious in other youth movements and groups because they do not aim at unity. She noted distinctions of age as a source of division at first occupying the committee to define and then to later abolish while continuing to suggest to communities that they advance the young into service and responsibility. It was her observation that youth had to originate “a fresh imagination, a profound and mature originality” identifying and integrating people into one cohesive work. She identified that youth had been attracted to the Bábí Faith before and that waves of the young continued in each stage of leadership of the religion yielding "…a sense of greatness of the Cause, teaching by their example that devotion and reverence, that patient service.” She then highlighted then present examples of youth community in action. Her first was that of the youth of Flint MI who formed an assembly all of young people, (that even the few more elderly fit in naturally,) in September 1935. Their community was active with discussion, recreation, and traveling speakers stopping in. Aside from that singular community, she outlined a breadth of youth among existing communities. The fall 1935 survey found 28 organized groups of youth in America and a total of 61 localities with Baháʼí youth, 16 to 25 years old. She highlighted the London youth group as fielding a dynamic program of activities with a total of 25 Baháʼís there. Then she pointed out the success of teams presenting the religion specifically in Los Angeles, San Francisco, and New York, where non-Baháʼís played central roles of bringing events together followed by a brief discussion and then the floor was opened up. Such work brought unity, she claimed. Inter-community conferencing was successful at raising levels of activity. A national youth conference held during the 1934 national convention had attracted 73 youth and a lively round-table discussion. A need she identified is that of a closer geography - that centers of activity around New York, San Francisco and Los Angeles existed as well but the densest and largest area was the Midwest from Urbana-Peoria to Milwaukee-Kenosha who met at Louhelen Baháʼí School in 1935 and other regional meetings. Indeed across America by far the largest gathering of youth to 1936 was at Louhelen. She noted a group of Iranian youth in Paris succeeding as a community at conferences, a group in Baghdad, Sydney, Maui (with a large Japanese group being a uniquely diverse group,) Beirut and Qazvin, Iran, Belgrade, and Tokyo.

With the burgeoning work accelerating, the report outlined that the US was divided into three regions to better assist and understand local action came about as a follow-up of the national assembly doing this to expedite its own business following the natural concentration around the three Summer Schools. She noted the first regional youth conference in 1934 at Louhelen (aka the Central State Summer School) and the group of almost 50 there elected a Youth Council - an event that was responded to by Shoghi Effendi. Sixty attended the next year and their Youth Council sent a letter to Shoghi Effendi summarizing the spirit and classes offered and to which he replied August 3. Though Geyserville and Green Acre had not achieved independent youth conferences they were both taking steps of specialized offerings for youth. The 1935 Geyserville youth were summarized as: 15 youth, 15 to 25 years old, plus 17 for 10 to 14 years old, and 13 for 7–9 years old. The Geyserville school was looking at establishing a small youth newsletter among the Western states. Green Acre had three classes for youth held one weekend in 1934, but not enough had committed to attend a 1935 follow-up noting the expense and remoteness of the school relative to the youth population centers and resources. The 1936 religious census conducted by the United States government reported 2,584 adult Baháʼís. Summer schools were also noticed in Germany back to 1932 though now youth could only participate in general meetings because of a legal proscription of youth participating in any coordinated youth activities other than the Nazi youth brigades.

Communications was referenced next in the report. Australia already had an ongoing youth section of its national Baháʼí newspaper. The American Baháʼí News had published many articles and news from the committee and the committee had itself sent an occasional newsletter out hoping it will grow into an international Baháʼí Youth quarterly newsletter. Youth were also encouraged to attend the 19 day Feasts from 1934. A separate article reviewed youth in Iran. Holley managed to encourage a youth meeting in Japan. In America Holley advanced a practice of coordinated round-robin letters for isolated individuals and inter-community meetings for others.

==== Adding regional efforts ====
In May 1936 Holley also published “Sources of community life” in World Order Baháʼí magazine. That month also saw the beginning of the implementation of ʻAbdu'l-Bahá's Tablets of the Divine Plan promulgating the religion across America and Latin America. In the summer Holley was published as a member of the Baháʼí World volume 7 and Contacts committees and not on the youth committee, and served a session at Geyserville school. The task of the Contacts committee was to engage receptive individuals in correspondence about the religion. In December 1936 Holley's article on ʻAbdu'l-Baha's seven candles of unity part on political unity was published in World Order. Holley was mentioned working with the San Bernardino community following some public presentations resulting in the interest of setting up a Baháʼí study class. Before the spring of 1937, Holley's efforts in San Bernardino had others cooperating and reaching out to Yucaipa and Big Bear, California. By spring 1937 a new regional committee for California, Arizona and Nevada had Holley as a member. Their report mentioned the extension of work promoting the religion started out of Los Angeles and reached out to cities Riverside, Covina, La Jolla, San Diego, Long Beach, San Bernardino, Pine Knot, Chula Vista, Santa Paula, Santa Barbara, Glendale, Pasadena, and Van Nuys with some cities setting up regular classes and symposia or visiting isolated Baháʼís who can host a social gathering.

In March Holley gave a talk in San Diego on the religion. Before the summer 1937 a picture of Holley was circulated among the youth as a seed effort to youth sending their own pictures and groups and contact information. Holley taught classes at the Geyserville and then at the summer youth session at Louhelen where Holley lead informal youth sessions in the evening for a half hour followed by programs as planned by the youth overseen by Garreta Busey as well as being of the faculty for the 1st general session on the “Science of the love of God” class. Attendees were attracted from Buffalo, NY. During her service in 1937 Holley made the suggestion of a practicum, a "laboratory" session, for students which became standard practice. Then Holley went on to the Green Acre season helping out with Sunday devotional services and Friday evening discussions. Holley also visited the Philadelphia, West Hempstead, and New Haven communities for Baháʼí events. In August she spoke to a study class on the religion in San Luis Obispo, CA.

For the 1937-8 commitment to national committees, Holley was part of Baháʼí World volume 7 and Contacts committees again, and not youth or the regional committee for California/Arizona/Nevada. In the summer Holley was at Louhelen again and also aided the Montreal community celebrate the 25th anniversary of the visit of ʻAbdu'l-Bahá with several speaking engagements and a short radio address. A review of the progress establishing the religion before the end of the year mentions Holley moving to Huntington, WV. In February Holley was part of a symposium on World Youth Day Bahaʼi Center in the Beaux Arts Building in Los Angeles. Holley also contributed a radio talk "What future for youth" Dorothy Baker called "a vigorous viewpoint on world affairs." She was also among the speakers at the Baháʼí House of Worship again 1937.

==== San Francisco ====
1939 was another low point in the visibility of her activity but there was some news - in March Holley spoke to a meeting in San Francisco for Baháʼí Naw-Rúz, was in Geyserville in July, and returned to San Francisco where she gave another talk in September.

In Feb 1940 Holley gave a talk at a Bahaʼi meeting held at Sutter St., just down the street from their new Center opened in July. A session in how the religion was spreading in Latin-America held in Colorado Springs in June had Holley as part of a symposium on the topic of progressive revelation. She then took part in the memorial service for May Maxwell and wrote her "in memoriam" article for Bahaʼi World volume 8. Bill and Marguerite Sears marriage was arranged in San Francisco by Holley during their visit out there for a radio broadcast Bill did in September 1940.

In April 1941 Holley was one of the two official observers representing the national assembly to international peace meetings associated with the League of Nations. Holley was a faculty in the Geyserville school in the July giving talks on the "essentials of the Baháʼí Faith", public speaking, open discussion, and in comparison of the Bible, Qurʼan, and Baháʼí scriptures for youth. Following Holley spoke at the San Francisco Bahaʼi Center, and at a meeting in Berkeley. Holley was also among the speakers for a series of talks across the country in the fall of 1941.

In 1942-4 Holley embarked on a series of talks more or less monthly in San Francisco and was employed as a budget analyst for the city of San Francisco. In March 1942 Holley spoke twice, after a series she held in Reno, NV. In April Holley was among the delegates to the national convention for the San Francisco area. In May she was back giving talks in San Francisco. The preliminary program for Geyserville for 1942 had Holley on a class reviewing the Babi-Baháʼí era and Baháʼí views of prophecies. In 1942-3 Holley was named to the national teaching committee. In October she presented a talk in San Francisco, and in November Holley was named the advisor to the national youth committee she had originally helped form and gave a talk at the local library in San Francisco. September 1943 Holley gave a talk and again in October, twice in December, and was also on radio KYA. Holley continued her twice-a-month talks into January 1944 and returned to giving a talk in April and as part of a symposium panel in May before joining in the Centenary Convention program giving a talk “Growth of the American Bahaʼi Community to 1944” which was later published as an article in World Order in September and was also included in volume 10 of Baháʼí World. In June she was back in San Francisco giving a talk, co-presented a talk September, and returned to the radio as well. Another talk in October was followed in December with the co-written “The call to unity” published in World Order. Holley co-presented at the 1945 San Francisco community Naw Ruz festival and was back on radio KYA a few days later. Another talk followed in mid-May and she appeared at a birthday event saying she was affiliated with the San Francisco Community Chest. That July she was in Geyserville and Isobel Sabri was moved by her talk in one class. In October 1945 a book review of World Order of Baháʼu'lláh was published and one day she received a telegram asking for her to marry David Hofman. Soon it was announced she would leave for England about to marry David Hofman. In August 1946 Arthur Dahl credited the work of Holley as key to his article on the UN meeting in 1945 in San Francisco and wanted to give her co-writing credit, though she never saw his piece herself.

== The United Kingdom ==
After her move to Britain records are less available.

In October 1945, Marion went to the UK to marry David Hofman, and was seen as of benefit to the growth of the religion there. In December a letter on behalf of Shoghi Effendi recommend the national assembly ask Hofman to serve on the national teaching committee because of her recent experience. She soon served on the National Spiritual Assembly of the British Isles 1945/6-1962, and its national teaching committee 1945/6-1950.

In October 1946, Hofman's (née Holley) article "The way of fulfillment" was published in World Order. In September the Hofmans were noted pioneering and generally the Hofmans were noted active in the growing UK Baháʼí community. In later 1946 or 47 Hofman gave a course on Baháʼí administration recalled by a pioneer to Holland and she attended a January 1947 conference of Baháʼís in Manchester during the severe Winter of 1946–47 in the United Kingdom with a booklet by Ruhiyyih Khanum. In October, Hofman was noted secretary of the national teaching committee.

Hofman attended a meeting at held by Baháʼís before Ridván 1948 in Cardiff and in August was noted back in the Berkeley, CA, area giving a talk. In November 1949, a spiritual assembly was elected in Oxford, UK with David Hofman chair and Marion vice-chair.

At the 1951 summer school held in Holland, Hofman was noted chairing the discussion meeting of the whole attendance following the reading of the latest message from Shoghi Effendi - and they were able share news the Hofmans had heard of events in Africa. The Hofmans were visited by friends from Geyserville in 1952.

In July 1953, the Hofmans co-chaired the international conference hosted in Sweden. 377 Baháʼís attended from 30 countries. Hofman noted that in anticipation of specific plans of buying sites for Baháʼí Temples money had already been donated, a substantial percentage of attendants has pledged to pioneer at the conference, and that atmosphere of success raised the spirits of all Baháʼís. Hofman wrote “The Kingdom of God on Earth; idea and reality” included in Baháʼí World volume 12. In June 1954 Hofman was appointed to be an Auxiliary Board member to assist Hand of the Cause George Townshend. In later 1954 Hofman again came to Cardiff and in Feb 1955 the couple moved to Cardiff to preserve its assembly. In the spring of 1955 Hofman “encouraged and assisted” a pioneer to Malta. Roushan Aftabi Knox recalled being told by Hofman that she was the youngest Knight of Baháʼu'lláh.

In 1956 Hofman wrote an account of her trip to the northern Isles of the UK as a member of the UK national assembly. She remarked on the people of Lerwick, the first public meeting in Shetland, and the earnest questions asked there and the Orkney Islands and recognized from time to time a native speaker as well as visitors from still further islands.

Hoffman spoke at the national convention in 1958 about pioneering and then again at an international conference in Germany.

The Benelux Baháʼí Summer School was held in July 1960 in Holland and Hofman contributed a presentation on the Tablets of the Divine Plan. Hofman's talk was recorded and shared subsequently.

Following the sudden growth of the Cardiff community in 1959-1960, the Hofmans announced they were moving in September to London briefly before moving to Watford. In 1961 Spiritual Assembly of Pontypridd organized and held its first weekend school with Hofman among the speakers invited. Hofman reported nearly fifty people had attended. Hofman was scheduled to come to a Cardiff in August 1962.

Since David Hofman's election to the Universal House of Justice in 1963 Marion was in charge of George Ronald Publishers by herself which she ran for some 12 years from Israel and retired from the Auxiliary Board and service on the National Assembly. Meanwhile a weekend school for the Baháʼís in 1964 was held in Porthcawl at which Hofman was a presenter.

Hofman's mother Grace died August 1964, and her father in 1965.

In 1966 Rosey E. Pool learned from Hofman that Robert Hayden's poem "A Ballad of Remembrance", had not entered a competition and pursued its entry. Hofman began to serve on the research staff at the World Center. And Hofman was the first speaker at a public event in 1966 in Kendal, England.

About 1975 or so the management of George Ronald Publishers was shifted to their son Mark and David and Marion went on travels around the world. Hofman was present for the election of the national assembly of Cyprus in 1977.

In 1986 Hofman's biographical article for Hand of the Cause Hasan Balyuzi was published in Bahaʼi World volume 18.

Having been re-elected regularly since 1963, in 1988 David Hofman retired from the Universal House of Justice and the couple retired to Oxford, UK, and Hofman would become active again in Norway, Sweden, Holland, Czechoslovakia and Ireland.

She died on December 5, 1995. David Hofman died in May 2003. The Hofmans had two children.

== See also ==
- Marion Carpenter Yazdi, another Baháʼí student of Stanford and Berkeley.
