= Garreta (surname) =

Garreta or Garréta is a surname and a given name. Notable people with the name include:

== Surname ==
- Anne F. Garréta, French novelist
- Félix Garreta (born 2004), Spanish footballer
- Juli Garreta (1875–1925), Spanish composer
- Raimundo de Madrazo y Garreta (1841–1920), Spanish painter

== Given name ==
- Garreta Busey (1893–1976), American academic, writer, and banker
