= Marion Carpenter Yazdi =

American student

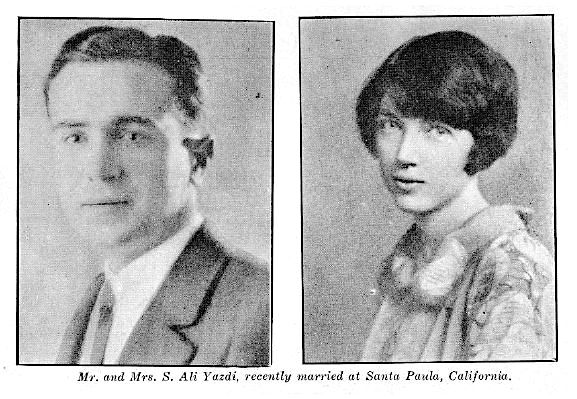
- Ali M. Yazdi and Marion B. Carpenter (c. 1926)
- Born: Marion Bernice Carpenter; 2 October 1902; Marcellus, Cass County, Michigan, U.S.
- Died: 2 February 1996 (aged 93); Natick, Middlesex County, Massachusetts, U.S.
- Occupation: Writer
- Known for: Writer, first follower of the Baháʼí Faith to attend University of California at Berkeley, and Stanford University
- Spouse: Ali M. Yazdi
- Parent(s): Crowell E. Carpenter; Elizabeth

Marion Carpenter Yazdi (née Marion Bernice Carpenter; October 9, 1902 at Marcellus, Cass County, Michigan, – February 2, 1996 at Natick, Middlesex County, Massachusetts or at Wellesley, Norfolk County, Massachusetts) was an American and the first adherent of the Baháʼí Faith to attend the University of California at Berkeley, and at Stanford University. She was a daughter of Crowell E. and Elizabeth Carpenter, natives of Michigan and Ohio, respectively, who moved from Schoolcraft, Kalamazoo County, Michigan to Santa Paula, Ventura County, California between the 1910 and 1920 censuses.

She married in 1926 to Ali M. Yazdi (1899–1978), a native of Persia (now Iran) who immigrated to the United States in 1920. He was a civil engineer, and a noted Baháʼí writer and lecturer who served in the National Spiritual Assembly of the Baháʼís of the United States and as chairman of the Local Spiritual Assembly of Berkeley, California for 30 years. His life and service were commemorated by Marion in her 1982 book, Youth in the Vanguard: Memoirs and Letters Collected by the First Baháʼí Student at Berkeley and at Stanford University.

The Ali and Marion Yazdi Building at 2910–2912 Telegraph Avenue in Berkeley, California is a registered Berkeley Landmark (no. 324) since July 7, 2016.

== See also ==
- Marion Holley, another Baháʼí student of Stanford and Berkeley
