= Detroit: Race Riots, Racial Conflicts, and Efforts to Bridge the Racial Divide =

2013 book

Detroit: Race Riots, Racial Conflicts, and Efforts to Bridge the Racial Divide is a 2013 non-fiction book by Joe T. Darden and Richard Walter Thomas, published by Michigan State University Press.

The book explains how the 1967 Detroit riot affected the city.

== Background ==
Reviewer David Fasenfest described the authors as "seasoned scholars of the city".

== Contents ==
There are 13 chapters in total. The riots are examined in the first chapter. Other chapters each have a theme.

The authors compare the financial, racial, and quality of life aspects of Detroit and of its suburban areas. The book explains how African-Americans became dominant in Detroit politics and how suburbs had increasing hostile relations with the city. The authors wrote about the mayoralties of Coleman Young, Dennis Archer, and Kwame Kilpatrick. The book also explores the interactions between African-Americans and other ethnic minorities in Metro Detroit. The final chapter discusses the drug trade and other criminal activity. The Milliken v. Bradley case, and the murder of Vincent Chin (Chapter 7) are discussed.

The authors propose a "spatial mobility" program to improve the lives of Detroit residents by distributing some of them to suburbs.

Fasenfest compared the analysis of institutions in this book to that in The Wire. Karen R. Miller of LaGuardia Community College stated that there was not much content about organizations that tried to counter neoliberalism.

== Reception ==
Ronnie A. Dunn of Cleveland State University stated that the book is "important and compelling", and that the "true value" comes from examining how racial tensions impact a metropolitan area as a whole. Dunn argued that he was not sure suburbs would cooperate with the proposed program or whether it would help sufficient numbers of residents.

Fasenfest stated that the work is akin to a textbook, "and for many this will be both its strength and its weakness." Fasenfest also argued that the examination on race missed other aspects, arguing that the chapter on the murder of Vincent Chin omitted how the decline in American automakers resulted in anti-Asian racism. Fasenfest concluded that he would recommend the book.

Miller stated that the work included "a rich portrait of state and nongovernmental engagement with racial issues."
