= Louhelen Baháʼí School =

Bahá'í educational institution near Davison, Michigan, United States

Coordinates: 42°59′09″N 83°30′35″W

Louhelen Baháʼí School is one of three leading institutions owned by the National Spiritual Assembly of the Baháʼís of the United States. The others are Green Acre Baháʼí School and Bosch Baháʼí School. Louhelen is near Davison, Michigan.

The school property was bought for Baháʼí purposes in 1930 by the new married couple Lou and Helen Eggleston and they hosted a picnic that year. The first school session was held in 1931 and was run via a committee organized by the national community through the 1930s and 40s. Innovations in the period were adding distinct sessions for youth and junior youth and practicum laboratory sessions. All the while the material setting was also advanced. In 1947 the Egglestons donated the school property valued over $50k and the National Spiritual Assembly of the US bought the residence which was organically part of the school. The work of maintaining the site was then kept by two committees and on-site managers though the Egglestons continued to associate with the school into the early 1950s. Lou died in 1953 while their daughter assisted the school in 1955. For a period of two years, however, the school was shut down as were all the Baháʼí schools, in 1949 and 1950 to conserve resources for the cost of finishing the Baháʼí House of Worship in Wilmette and to clearly establish the thrust of work of promulgating the religion in Latin America.

Activities resumed and continued through the 1960s into the early 1970s. However a safety situation developed and in 1974 the school was closed by the national assembly. An investment of $1.8 million followed with plans drawn up and construction projects carried out from 1980 to 1982 and the school re-opened with some buildings restored, others replaced and the mission more explicitly being a residential college and conference center.

A number of subject areas have been advanced across the periods of the school. One was race unity, a subject at the school explicitly since 1932 when Maye Gift's talks on race led to a compilation that was well received in multiple reprints. The school welcomed inter-racial couples, members of diverse races, and a project supporting black students going to attend integrating schools in Greenville, SC, in 1964 was undertaken and a socioeconomic development program Understanding Racism initiative in 1986. Books were also developed from other presentations at the school - some of Stanwood Cobb's work was gathered from working for a school session, and the text of The Divine Art of Living evolved from presentations. Moslem and Christian subjects were studied early on. Later a residential college program supported students who stayed at the school and were students in area colleges. Scholars of the religion gathered annually at the school in the form of the Association for Baháʼí Studies and the Irfan Colloquia and attracted performers like Andy Grammer, and Kevin Locke. The school also supported a grandparents-and-grandkids program of learning indigenous Indian cultural history.

== Early history ==
=== Pre-history ===
The Genesee County area was developed by Euro-Americans following the development of an Indiana Territory and its dissolution. Then, the region went through transitions from a territory to a state. Freeman Sweers established the farm near Davison, Michigan in the latter 1800s and sold to a D. P. Hall. In 1924, Sweers bought into a development in Florida. About the time of the Great Depression in the United States and in bad condition, the farm was bought by Lou (Lewis W.) and Helen Eggleston. Lou was born about 1873, worked in heating industry, and then, at about the age of 50, Lou married Helen and bought the farm, then about 268 acres. Helen was daughter of E. D. and Mrs. Whitney, of Lansing.

==== 1930 ====
Helen, still going by her maiden name of Whitney, sent a message to the Baháʼí News, early monthly periodical of the religion, published in October 1930, of the intention of setting it up as a dairy farm "to operate as far as possible along Baha'i lines". In the face of the extending troubles of the Depression that year, a picnic was held; it was one of two informal picnics Baháʼís held in Michigan that year.

The name "Louhelen", a contraction of their first names, was originally used as in "Louhelen Ranch". Louhelen was also the name of their daughter and they also had a son Lewis Jr. both of which came along later.

=== Central States Baha'i School in the 1930s ===
==== 1931 ====
The July 1931 edition of Baháʼí News published the announcement of the program at the Central States Baháʼí Summer School, the first name of the school, August 1–9 with lodgings and two meals a day for $10-$12 for the week and noted correspondence should be sent to Helen Whitney Eggleston to an address in Detroit. The faculty included Harlan and Grace Ober, already active in the religion many years in the Boston area and Green Acre Baháʼí School, Mabel and Howard Ives, Dorothy Baker, Fanny Knobloch, and Maye Harvey Gift. Mary Collison and Miss McKay were support staff. The Obers and Ives planned the school as a committee. 35 Baha'is and friends from six states attended all the sessions and about 50 others, mainly from Detroit and Flint, came as day students to one or more classes. Baker's entire family attended. The sessions were held that year in a wooded area sloping down to a clear stream, either in a lodge on the hillside or in an open-air amphitheater nearby. Some 20 people attended the first day and about 90 total attended at least one day of activities.

The Egglestons devoted themselves to developing the school's facilities. A small barn was partitioned into private rooms and became a Pullman type lodge, providing long narrow rooms. A dining porch was added to the main house to improve the serving of meals. 80 acres of the Eggleston farm were allotted to be used by the school. A ravine was named Ridvan Garden. Details were covered in the two main periodicals of the religion of the day - Baháʼí News, and Star of the West, the oldest large scale journal of the religion in the US, in December, 1931. Topics of the sessions included economics, the problem of greed and it's amelioration and another was practical and inspirational approaches to being trustworthy. There was also a daily class in public speaking, study of ʻAbdu'l-Bahá's talks, a leading figure of the religion, children's classes, and international subjects. Recreational activities in the afternoon included swimming and horse-back riding. The author of the Star of the West article recalled there being a log cabin overlooking the ravine. Bertha Hyde Kirkpatrick, a Baha'i since at least 1927, was present at this first session and would long serve the school.

Noting the need for a center of activity between the coasts and the progress of the Eggleston and noted some 35 attendees with 90 at least some session. A message from Shoghi Effendi, then head of the religion, was quoted "To achieve success in such manner the first year is certainly beyond what we could expect."

==== 1932 ====
In 1932, the summer school became a recognized Baháʼí institution. A committee was appointed by the National Spiritual Assembly of the United States consisting of Lou Eggleston, Dorothy Baker, and Bertha Hyde Kirkpatrick. Subjects and faculty were published ahead of time. The cost for participants was published at $9 to $12 for room with 2 meals per day for nine days and suggesting dinners in nearby Davison. In addition to the school July 31 to August 9, events and meetings happened beyond the school session. A specific inter-community conference took place July 31. Faculty and subjects included Bishop Brown (Baháʼí administration,) and Mrs. Brown (outline for the study of The Dawn-Breakers,) Pearl Easterbrook (prayer and meditation,) Albert Vail (study of The Dawn-Breakers,) Dorothy Baker (who oversaw a youth meeting of some 18-20 and had many supplemental presentations by other faculty,) Ruth Moffett (the Temple being built, and spiritual illumination,) Maye Harvey Gift (amity work – in 1935 Gift would co-produced the first compilation of Baha'i references to race issues, circulated more in 1942 which was revised and republished in expanded form in 1943, and 1956, also owned by Rev. Martin Luther King Jr,) Elizabeth Greenleaf, chair of the new national youth committee (on youth consultation,) as well as some youth. Several of the faculty – Vail, Gift, and Easterbrook being leaders from various Illinois communities – Urbana and Peoria especially – though Vail had already more of a nation visibility and had given up a likely winning career as a unitarian universalist minister and in the case of Easterbook position in the New Thought movement. In addition to Baker's family, Jakob Kunz's daughters attended.

A meeting was arranged by local Rev. J. M. Pengelly who became interested from the 1931 meeting where he attended the classes by Harlan Ober. Pengelly also invited Ruth Moffett to address his church group.

Average attendance during the school approached 60 (twice the previous year) and filled the accommodations. An additional 10-20 from Detroit attended some days. 18-20 youth attended and some paid their way by service. Dorothy Baker supervised the youth who held their own forum, daily elected a chair from their own group and called for two short talks for each session followed by an open forum limiting the speaker to not comment further. Albert Vail's study of The Dawn-Breakers, included instruction on Muslim history. Also $50 was gathered for donation to the Temple construction following a fundraiser by Orcella Rexford. She had attended at the urging of friends at the last minute and later wrote an article for Star of the West. She recalled driving past the ranch house on the winding driveway with a nine-sided building hosting water resources and staying in one of the new cabins. She noted the Pullman Lodge was two-story and that people had come from as far as California and Maine as well as one who had finished a round-the-world trip. Half the attendees were called youth and looked forward to "doing something". The closing night the youth presented an original play "O wad some Pow'r the giftie gie us to see ourself as others see us" quoting Robert Burns and imitating various of the elders present.

Again the Egglestons looked at improving, adding, and remodeling buildings between this session and the next.

==== 1933 ====
Amidst the closing of banks and tightening money during the early part of the year via the Emergency Banking Act, plans for the summer 1933 moved the school about a month earlier, June 25-July 3. The national assembly specifically asked that the overall program for promoting the religion across the country was to be presented at Louhelen and Green Acre Baháʼí Schools that year. Dorothy Baker was to lead youth group, and new Pullman Apartments had been added to the barn to accommodate more people. Faculty include Bishop and Mrs. Brown, Allen McDaniel, Harlan and Grace Ober, Elizabeth Greenleaf and Dorothy Baker, Fanny Knobloch, and Lillian Seilken. Three meals a day and room were paid for at between $12.50 to $23 for the whole session, average attendance was about 70 and there were 140 total attendees. Elizabeth Greenleaf opened the session with a presentation on meditation and prayer, then Harlan Ober, assisted by Greenleaf, reviewed Baháʼí administration as it was understood then - Allen McDaniel was sick. Dorothy Backer gave daily talks from The Dawn-Breakers. Afternoon public meetings attracted a few visitors. Youth did the planning of evening events. Some 26 youth participated in total and included some non-Baha'is. Philip Sprague came late and gave a talk on the progress of the Temple. $500 was raised for it. Ruth Moffett gave a talk. Mary Maxwell, soon to marry Shoghi Effendi and change her name to Rúhíyyih Khanum, also gave two talks based on The Dawn-Breakers. The final advertised program of faculty and topics was: Elizabeth Greenleaf (Kitáb-i-Íqán,) Greenleaf and Harlan Ober (Baha'i Administration,) Dorothy Baker (The Dawn-Breakers,) Ober (religion and society,) Gretch Westervelt (new education,) Orcella Rexford (tomorrow,) Grace Obert (cycle of life,) Fanny Knobloch (Baháʼí Faith to South Africa,) Harlan Ober (New civilization,) and Baker (cosmic consciousness of unity.)

==== 1934 ====
Planned for June 30 to July 8, the faculty proposed were: Allen B. McDaniel, Mary Hanford Ford, Shahnaz Waite, Gretchen Westervelt, Dorothy Baker, and Philip Sprague. Topics were to include Baha'i administration, The Dawn Breakers, and the Bible. A youth conference of 16 people in Lima, Ohio, gathered from Ohio, Indiana, Illinois, Michigan, and Wisconsin, at the end of March consulted about Louhelen. They first noted a change in date for the youth session to June 25-8 and faculty and subjects as: devotionals by Dorothy Baker, Baháʼí ideals in a forum by Harlan Ober, effective leadership by Marion Holley, (Olympian in the 1928 games,) spiritual aspects of the teachings by Mary Hanford Ford, Bible study and comparative religion by James McCormick, and had rates from $5 to $8 for four days, meals, and board. At the time it was the only such session among any of the Baha'i schools. However it happened July 10–13 instead of late June, and Dorothy Baker returned to lead the session assisted by Philip Sprague. Mary Maxwell and James McCormick also assisted the youth group meeting. The youth group focused on dramatic re-enactments.

The general session of nine days was to cost between $12.50 to $18.50. Detroit newspapers noted the gathering at Louhelen as well as the organizing committee including Bertha Hyde Kirkpatrick and L. W. Eggleston. They also listed the members of the year's Detroit Assembly including Lou Eggleston as chair and Mrs. Eggleston as corresponding secretary.

Sylvia Paine wrote a summary of her experience at the school in the session for the September Star of the West edition. She recounted how two youth visitors looking for riding horses chanced upon the Baha'i school in session and stayed a half hr to hear of the ideas. Paine noted the school conference was 14 days long. Meditation and prayer, narratives of Baha'i history, principles of governance, and there was room for swimming and playing tennis, baseball or horse riding. Piano playing was also to be found as well as sing-alongs. She also noted the youth gathering for four days for the first time, and there was a conscious attempt to vary the faculty. She also states the goals of the schools:: to deepen one's knowledge of the religion, to have an opportunity for Baha'is to meet and find friendships, to inform seekers, and be a testing ground for spirit and precepts meet. A letter from Shoghi Effendi was addressed to that school's session. Presenting the high goals of virtues, he said, ""the work in which you are engaged is dear and near to my heart and constitutes one of the most vital aspects of the manifold activities of our beloved Faith."

==== 1935 ====
At the spring national convention Dale Cole described a youth group in Flint, MI, founded by the influence of the Louhelen Summer School, who then formed a Spiritual Assembly in 1935. This was also highlighted by the youth committee reported by Marion Holley.

The 1935 season was scheduled to begin with a youth session June 24–27 with faculty and subjects as: Dorothy Baker (Baha'i Life), Bishop Brown (Baha'i approach to world problems), Shoghi Effendi's letters (run by the "Young People's Council"), What is the Baha'i movement (under the direction of the "Council"). This was followed by the general session June 29-July 7 with faculty and subjects: Horace Holley, (Baha'i activities,) Stanwood Cobb, (Security in a failing world, based on his 1934 book,) Loulie Matthews (Divine Art of Living, material of which was gathered and published as early as 1940, see Baháʼí Faith on life after death), and a second general summer session August 19–24 not announcing faculty yet.

An updated program appeared in July outlining the second session with its first faculty Carl Scheffler and E. Lenore Morris. The final faculty announced was: Mrs. Barry Orlova, Stanwood Cobb, Dorothy Baker, Bishop Brown, Horace Holley, and Mamie Seto, a Baháʼí from Hawaii, with members of the Lansing Baháʼís attending including George and Mrs. Angell, Cora Reed, Ed and Mrs. Whitney, H. A. and Mrs. Jersey, William and Mrs. Warner, Earl Shetterly, Marie Fox, Bert and Gale Peek, Allen McLean. The Central States Baha'i Summer School Committee sent a letter to Baháʼí News published in a summer 1935 supplement saying the school will be held June 29 at the request of the national teaching committee and responding to the telegram from Shoghi Effendi and that reservations be sent in as quickly as possible.

Marion Holley organized a survey of Baháʼí youth in America published in 1936 and found that by far the largest mid-western gathering of youth to that date was at the Louhelen in 1935. Another youth meeting was planned to be held in 1936 chaired by Wildrid Barton of Winnetka, IL. The idea of a survey was mentioned in 1934 by the new nationally organized Baháʼí youth committee,

==== 1936 ====
The youth session for 1936 was planned June 22-5; faculty were advertised as Bahiyyih Lindstrom, Dorothy Baker, and Stanwood Cobb. Some 80 youth attended and listed Glen Shook among the faculty. The Chicago Baháʼí youth oversaw the sports, afternoon and evening entertainments and they developed their own basic rules of conduct centered on the honor system. Discussions included the attitude towards the growing WWII (then brewing mostly in Europe,) and relationships with ecclesiastical organizations were among the topics. Garreta Busey gave a class on public speaking. The general session followed with faculty Dorothy Baker, Glenn Shook, and Stanwood Cobb. Baker's attendance was in the context of having given up her savings for Baháʼí pilgrimage as a contribution for the Baháʼí Temple and her talks included her choice in a marriage partner being guided more by prayers than by her attraction to a willing suitor.

The densest and largest concentration of Baháʼí youth in America was in the Midwest from the south of the Urbana-Peoria region north through Chicago to Milwaukee-Kenosha, and across America by far the largest gathering of youth to 1936 was at Louhelen.

This was followed by the general session June 28-July 5 including faculty Allen McDaniel, Glenn Shook, and Stanwood Cobb. A second session was added for August 2–9 with faculty Mamie Seto, Marzieh Carpenter (later Gail), and Willard McKay; two of the classes were on Islam/Islamic culture. The cost advertised for the 4 day youth session was $5, and general sessions per day of $1.35 to $2.10. L. W. Eggleston was still advertised leading the school in the Detroit Free Press. A brief profile and speakers at the school was profiled in the Lansing State Journal. Recognizing the historical character of the development, the relatively new Baháʼí national archives established under the National Spiritual Assembly called for materials for the summer schools to be preserved. The summer 1936 school at Louhelen was noted as one of the places an "inter-community" conference was held with a member of every assembly and group in the state present.

The second general session had faculty Maime Seto, Marzieh Carpenter, and Willar McKay. Note was taken of newspaper articles by Clarissa Bean of Flint, and in Detroit, if briefly. A public tour of Louhelen by Roscoe Springston, chair of the Detroit assembly, was advertised as well as some sessions available such as by Marzieh Carpenter and other classes offered.

==== 1937 ====
Bertha Hyde Kirkpatrick presented at the Baháʼí national convention about the schools in April.

The program committee oversaw all sessions for 1937 with the youth committee delegated for their session. Members of the program committee were L. W. Eggleston chair, and members Bishop Brown, E. J. Miessler, Doroth Baker, Garreta Busey, and Bertha Hyde Kirkpatrick served as secretary for the group. The youth committee had members Marguerite Reimer, (soon to be married to William Sears), Florence Mattoon, Wilfrid Barton, (and a youth of Lima, Ohio, to be elected by youth present.)

The youth session was advertised running June 27-July 1; faculty advertised were Willard McKay, Annamarie and Margert Kunz, Garretta Busey, Marzieh Carpenter, and 1928 Olympian Marion Holley. Some attended from Buffalo, NY. A youth then non-Baháʼí in California later wrote of her experience coming to the religion after being much impressed by a faculty of the Louhelen 1937 session as an article in 1942's World Order magazine.

The first general session then ran July 3–11 with faculty Allen McDaniel, Marzieh Carpenter, Garetta Busey, and Marion Holly. A class on publicity was done at Louhelen in July 1937 by Mrs. Wendell E. Bacon and draft articles accomplished in the class were sent to area newspapers and Lou Eggleston himself published a long article on the history of the Louhelen school in the Davison newspaper.

The second general session ran July 31-August 8 with faculty N. M. Firoozi, Glen Shook, and Dorothy Baker. Room and board for general sessions per day per person ran $1.50 to $2.15. Lothar Shurgast, former spy for Germany, also came as faculty in August. Some Binghamton, NY, Baháʼís were noted attending Louhelen this August session.

==== 1938 ====
In April 1938 the national library committee reported in Baháʼí News that it had contributed books to the Baháʼí school libraries including Louhelen. Meetings on race unity were held in lead up to the general session. Emogene Hoagg gave study classes in the Flint community staying at Louhelen since May, and was among many faculty that year who spoke in neighboring towns - Carl Scheffler, Robert Faines, McDaniel, Harlan Ober and Caswell all gave extra talks in the area. The first general session August 6–13 had faculty Curtis Kelsey, Helen Bishop, Alice Bacon, Marzieh Carpenter, with costs between $1.50 and $2.15 per day.

The youth session ran at $1.20 per day for August 16–20 with faculty Virginia Camelon, Edward Miessler, Helen Bishop, Carl Scheffler and Marzieh Carpenter. An article noted some from Lansing attending: Frank and Mrs. Evans, Grace Coltrin, Alverta Hamilton, George H and Mrs. Angell, Charity Ballard, Cora Reed, David and Mrs. Earl. Mrs. Earl was Joy Hill Earl, an African American, while David M. Earl was white. Thus the campus hosted an inter-racial black-white couple in 1938. A talk from faculty and attendees also followed a school session.

A change in 1938 was an added youth session and changed one of the general sessions into a laboratory session as suggested by Marion Holley. The laboratory session was added to allow students to concentrate on special projects; in 1938 it was a study project of 10 days by H. Imogene Hoagg, and a project to reach out to neighboring communities with literature and conversations, coordinately by Margarite Reimer.

Cobb's lectures developed for Louhelen classes in recent years were presented as a series of articles in World Order magazine across 1938 and collected and printed as a book as well.

==== 1939 ====
Having books donated the previous year there was need for a library building, and it was erected and called the Refuge in 1939, through financial support of Amelia Collins and Dorothy Graf. It was raised with labor donated by Lou and George Eggleston.

The first session in the summer of 1939 was a general session August 6–13 with faculty Curtis Kelsey, Helen Bishop, Alice Bacon, and Marzieh Carpenter; the second youth session ran from August 16–20 with faculty Virginia Camelon, Edward Miessler, Helen Bishop, Carl Scheffler, and Marzeih Carpenter, at $1.20 per day. The endeavor of the school was encouraged and commented on via a letter written on behalf of Shoghi Effendi to the Louhelen School on July 29.

A later session in August had faculty Helen Bishop and Marzieh Carpenter. Mrs Kenneth Christian spoke at the school in 1939.

Some attendees of the school sessions came from Lansing, Detroit, and newly weds Alice Halvorsen and Arthur Hendershot came all the way from Miami, Florida. Overall there were 54 youth in the first session and 47 in the second session. The youth classes for 1939 were reviewed in the October 1940 issue of Baha'i Youth by Betty Scheffler.

The first winter session at Louhelen held in the new library came in 1939-1940 for December 26 to January 1 with subjects pioneering, where a volunteers to leave their home for the purpose of supporting the religion somewhere else, deeper study, presenting the religion without public speaking, and psychology of attracting individuals and groups to the religion; registration was limited to 10 people and the cost was $2.25 per day. The faculty were Francis Stewart, Bertha Hyde Kirkpatrick, Ether Neal Furbush, and Harry Jay. Mrs. George Angell of Lansing was one of the attendees, as was Mrs. George R. True of Detroit.

==== 1940 ====
The summer 1940 sessions had some notices in June - Cynthia Powell would attend the youth sessions to counsel on job opportunities based on her studies at Columbia University, and there would be a Laboratory session on concentrated study by Emogeen Hoagg. Again meetings were held before the sessions by faculty among others. A June 1940 article in World Order magazine describes the state of Louhelen including that the library erected the year before now had had almost 800 books.

Four summer sessions were scheduled for the summer - the first youth session June 26–30, a Laboratory session July 3–12, a general session August 8–11, and a second youth session August 21–25. For the summer session, Korean chair of the Detroit assembly Harry Whang performed a Baha'i wedding at Loubelen. An attendee from Indianapolis, Indiana, and Racine, Wisconsin. Etty Graffe wrote an article about her experience with prayer, and she attended a 1941 summer session. Clarence Niss joined the Louhelen program committee in the later summer.

The winter session for 1940-1 at Louhelen was planned for December 26-January 1, would center on the as yet uncirculated text of Foundations of World Unity, by ʻAbdu'l-Bahá, (officially published in 1945,) and would cost $2/day presented by Mrs. (Virginia) David Camelon.

==== 1941 ====
Bertha Hyde Kirkpatrick attended an early planning session of the program committee in February. The Library was noted to have reached 1800 books, more than doubled, a year later; the collection had been reviewed by a public librarian in Detroit, and the collection had been redone according to the Dewey-Decimal system. That spring the Egglestons toured New York state in visiting several cities.

The printed program for the first youth session June 29-July 5, 1941 had faculty former Assistant Attorney General in Ohio (1937–38) and African-American Elsie Austin and Virginia Camelon, while Mrs. Rexford C. Parmalee, Lottie Graeffe and the Milwaukee Youth Group organized the evening program and the cost was $1.35 per person per day. The Laboratory session followed for July 8–17 with faculty Harry Jay, Solon Fieldman, Lotte Graeffe, members of national Baha'i committees, with costs of $1.60 to $2.25 per person per day. A separate vacation session followed July 19 - August 8 with informal meetings and a chance to practice Spanish and learn Latin American culture for rates of $1.50 to $2.25 per person per day. A general session ran August 10–17 with faculty Albert Windust, Alice Simmons Cox, (summa cum laude and founding Phi Kappa Phi member at Lombard College in 1925, and posthumous honor award winner from Knox College,) Bertha Hyde Kirkpatrick, and various forum and informal talks was advertised. Lastly, a second youth session ran August 20–26 with faculty Robert Gaines, F. St. George Spendlove, Margaret Ruhe, and cost $1.35 per person per day.

Bertha Kirkpatrick attended a planning session for the school in May.

Specific news of the extended season, also called a family session, came in June and mentioned support for practice in Spanish and a performance of a play on Tahirih by Mrs. Earl Andrews for the youth sessions. A substitution for the laboratory session on public speaking was going to be Virginia Camelon's "The heart of the Baha'i Faith" about the Baháʼí Covenant. There was some newspaper coverage of the school opening, and the youth session with faculty of Elsie Austin, Mrs. Rexford Parmalee, Lotte Graeffe, Mrs. (Virginia) Camelon, Alberto Liao of Brazil, and Kh-i-Hashimi of Iraq, mentioned in various articles. Cincinnatian Beulah Herndon acclaimed the prejudice free atmosphere at the school when she returned home, and four from Geneva NY noted their attendance from Geneva, NY. Nancy Gates, Mary E. Gates, and Beverly Collison with Mrs. R. C. Collison.

International Youth Day was held at Louhelen with Dorothy Beecher Baker, Mrs. Josue Picon, and Harry Whang speaking. The event was also mentioned in the Wayne State student newspaper with a student talk, exhibition and Philippine dances. F. St. G. Spendlove, painter Eduardo Selgado presenting, UoM Filipino students including Levi Barbour scholars. Orcella Rexford was noted teaching at Louhelen and attended a nearby international conference and several attendees there accepted invitations to come to Louhelen as well as a Philippine articles and some students. This was probably the Eighth International conference of the New Education Fellowship, held in July. A decade later a Filipino who had attended Louhelen was mentioned in an NGO report in Manilla.

In the atmosphere after Attack on Pearl Harbor, the 1941-2 winter session was set to center on Shoghi Effendi's new text The Promised Day is Come, (announced before the attack.) The winter of 1941 Louhelen school committee was published in December: Edward Miessler, Mrs. L. W. Eggleston, Phyllis Hall, Beatrice Eardley, Harry Whang, L. W. Eggleston, Bertha Hyde Kirkpatrick, Dorothy Graf. Mr and Mrs. W. W. Robinson attended the winter session from Ohio. Indeed Baha'is from Ohio, Indiana, Illinois, New York, Maryland and Michigan attended as well as some investigating the religion from Flint. Work was also done reviewing Prayers and Meditations and topics by Bertha Hyde Kirkpatrick with Gleanings from the Writings of Baháʼu'lláh was also shared. A public meeting was led by Frank Warner. Stanwood Cobb also spoke during the session and there were again Filipino visitors.

==== 1942 ====
In the face of World War II there was relatively limited commentary of the summer school sessions and no winter session was mentioned.

The June list of the program committee had Edmund Miessler, chair, Mrs. L. W. Eggleston, secretary, Phyllis Hall corresponding secretary, with general members Beatrice Eardley, Harry Whang, L. W. Eggleston, Kenneth Christian, Bertha Hyde Kirkpartick, and Dorothy Graf. The Fall 1942 Louhelen committee added Kenneth Christian.

Faculty for the summer 1942 session included Alice Cox, Kenneth Christian, Mrs. Christian Edmund Miessler and nine Detroit Baháʼís were noted attending. The Detroit community was then about 50 people Ohioans also attended.

==== 1943 ====
The national assembly added three youth to the program committee the next year: Paul Petit, Clement Perry, and Dick Suhm. The summer 1943 Louhelen program committee was published as follows: Chair was Edmund Miessler, Helen Eggleston secretary, Phyllis Hall corresponding secretary, and generally members Beatrice Eardley, Harry Whang, L. W. Eggleston, Kenneth Christian, Bertha Hyde Kirkpatrick, Paul Pettit, Clement Perry, and Dick Suhm. Michael Farrand was among the attendees from Detroit. There was also mention of 11 attendees of the Louhelen school intending to go pioneering.

Baha'is going to the 1943-4 winter school came from Detroit - Mrs. Clinton Wideman, Mrs. David Farrand, Etta Catlin, and Roscoe Springston.

==== 1944 ====
The 1944 season Louhelen school committees was chair, Edwin Miessler, Helen Eggleston Sec, Phyllis Hall corr sec., Beatrice Eardley, L. W. Eggleston, Bertha Hyde Kirkpatrick, Paul Pettit, Alice Kidder, and Charles Reimer. By the spring of 1944 there were accommodations for up to 75 in the summer and 25 in the winter and regularly supported five summer sessions plus one winter session as well as conferences and weddings. The school had three principles operating by 1944 - "to have a real school, a place to learn Truth, … to have a place where people may live for a time as a Baha'i community, practicing the oneness of mankind,… and to have one more spot when the Light of the New Day is radiated." Sessions for young people were divided 12 to 15 yrs old and another for over 15. Teachers had been invited to give talks at various venues in the area as well. The library had gathered some 2700 volumes and sold additional ones to inquirers in the region. 1944 also added child-care as a play school. Bertha Hyde Kirkpatrick attended. The summer 1944 program for Louhelen oriented to the Centenary of the Declaration of the Báb. The August 4–13 general session was followed by a youth session August 16–23 with rates from $1.65 to $2.75 per person per day. Reginald King gave a talk that summer of 1944; other faculty were Gretchen Westervelt, and Mrs. Wendell Bacon. A "Bible school" at Louhelen was also mentioned. A letter on behalf of Shoghi Effendi arrived for the 1944 session. Paul Petit was chair of the national youth committee and gave a report on events at Louhelen at a youth meeting.

Reginald King was at the winter session as well.

==== 1945 ====
The spring 1945 Louhelen school committee had Margaret Swengel join. The 1945 season school committee were Mrs. John E (Bertha Hyde) Kirkpatrick, chair, Helen Eggleston, sec, Phyllis Hall, cor. sec., Harry Whang, L.W. Eggleston, Edmund Missler, Mrs. Clinton W. Wideman, Roscie Springston, Margaret Swengel, and Richard Suhm.

Bertha Hyde Kirkpatrick and others from Battle Creek, MI, attended the summer session, as did Elsie Austin and Marzieh Gail from Detroit. Reginald King gave a talk in a later summer session, other faculty were Gretchen Westervelt, and Mrs. Wendell Bacon. A specific session was aimed to attract non-Baha'is in 1945.

For the end of 1945 into 1946 the Louhelen school committee was published as: Bertha Hyde Kirkpatrick chair, Helen Eggleston, sec., Harry Whang, L. W. Eggleston, Edmund Miessler, Rebecca L. Wideman, Alice Kidder, Winnie Foster, and Wm. Kenneth Christian. A Green Bay, Wisconsin, youth symposium set up a scholarship fund for going to the Louhelen school, as did Wauwatosa Baha'is. The school committee membership announced in December 1945 added George R. True, Aldham Robarts, Ralph Halverson, and Paul Pettit.

The 1945-6 winter program was of "Fundamental Verities" by Florence Reeb and "Character Development" by W. Kenneth Christian with rates of $2.50 and $3.00 per person per day. Attendees also came from Ohio.

==== 1946 ====
Amidst the spreading new of the Atomic bombings of Hiroshima and Nagasaki and the Surrender of Japan, the schedule for the summer of 1946 was: workshop courses June 29-July 10, Junior Youth July 13–19, Mid-summer session July 22–28, Laboratory July 31-August 11, and senior youth August 14–25. A specific offering was a conference for parents for July 20-1, … including a specific children development program.

The first summer session had Mamie Seto leading a class on Baháʼí ideas on spiritual growth, Paul E. Haney on the Baháʼí administrative order, Arthur Patterson on visual displays and exhibits, and Florence Reed on public speaking. The Jr youth session had Peggy True on Baha'i beliefs and conduct, Harry Ford on character, Paul Pettit on mapping travels and cultural encounter, Eleanor Hutchens on nature studies in art and natural materials, with time set aside for round-table discussions with Peggy True and Paul Pettit acting as campus counselors. Roberta Christian was director of the parent's conference.

The Laboratory session had Curtis Kelsey on use of Baha'i literature for the public, Emerie and Rosemary Sala on world unity and a book The Earth one country, and Harlan Ober on developing community. Alice Bacon ran evening programs such as on character. The senior youth session had Arnold Ketels on problems of youth connections, Heshmat Ala'i on the cycles of civilizations, Archie Tichneor on the emerging new world order, and Esther Wilson directed a choir, (the choir was recorded on a Peirce wire recorder.) The forum and talks of pioneering were overseen by Leena Boyd and Arnold Ketels. Rates varies from $1.75 to $3.

The mid-summer session was planned with Bahiyyih and Harry Ford directing a session on children and society problems as a combination workshop and lecture including non-Baha'i experts. Leaders in schools of teachers, principles, directors, as well as university faculty - Dr. E. N. Palmer of Fisk, and the University of Illinois' Dr. A. Y. McClusky.

On her way to the school Mamie Seto toured along many cities in the western US - Boise ID, Salt Lake City UT, and Laramie WY. Dorothy Baker talk also returned. Attendees came from Battle Creek, and Greenville, SC. An excerpt of a letter from Shoghi Effendi to the 1946 senior youth session was published in December.

== National establishment ==
=== 1947 ===
The Louhelen school committee announced for 1947 was: Winnie Foster chair, Helen Eggleston Sec, Arnold Ketels, Albert Segan, Bertha Hyde Kirkpatrick Paul Pettit, Rebecca Wideman, L. W. Eggleston, Larry Hautz, and Kenneth Christian. Two of the winter sessions were on Some Answered Questions led by Harlan Ober and a training class by Elizabeth Cheney. Mrs. J. E. (Bertha Hyde) Kirkpatrick and Dayne Farrand at winter session of Louhelen. The winter 1946-7 session included African-American Baha'i and non-Baha'i speakers: Mr. Eason as Flint Urban League Secretary, Baháʼí and African American Ellsworth Blackwell, of another interracial couple, and Arthur Patterson chairing the meeting. winter session Ramona Steffes talk at Center; returned from Louhelen in Winter.

The May 1947 Baháʼí News sought a registrar, normally Helen Eggleston's work since 1931, to handle room assignments, fee collection, and could attend some classes, room and board for services rendered. W. Foster spoke for the Baha'i national convention about the Louhelen school. He noted the sessions, and presented that the school was developing new talent and had begun working on a broad new curriculum. In parentheses Marzieh Gail noted the Egglestons had given the school and surrounding land of 9.5 acres to the national community. In September 1947 it was further publicly announced nine and a half acres were transferred to the trusteeship of the national assembly. A deed for the Davison School was set through the Eggleston Trustees for the Benefit of the National Spiritual Assembly of the US and Canada, excluding their residence, was set during 1947, with preliminary steps were being taken to purchase the residence to preserve the organic unity of the establishment. The 1948-9 national budget showed $1800 - this amount was for the primary residence of the Egglestons associated with the school, and the school in general and its land was a gift. It was also claried the total land acquired was "about 11 acres." The residence and about 2 acres (about 11-9.5) were ultimately purchased for $20K on a valuation of $54K in 1948.

A still longer program took place in the summer of 1947. Junior youth were defined as 10-14 yrs and their program ran June 30 to July 11. Faculty included Peggy True, Paul Becker and Annamarie Matoon. A workshop session July 14–25 followed with faculty Florence Reed, George R. True, Elizabeth Cheney and Lawrence Hautz. A two day conference for parents had directors Sylvia Paine Parmelee and Rexford C. Parmelee. The mid-summer session continued the Parmelee focus on children and parenting July 28-Aug 1. The Laboratory session followed Aug 4-15 led by faculty Archie Tichenor, Gretchen Westervelt, Matthew Bullock and Bertha Hyde Kirkpatrick. A senior youth session, defined for 15 to 20 yrs, was held Aug 18 to 29 and had faculty of William Sears, Elizabeth Cheney, Arthur Patterson, Helen Patternson, Edith McLaren and Albert Segen. Rates per day per person varied from $1.75 to $3 and individual meals for day visitors was broken out at $0.40 to $0.85.

Attending from Port Huron were Eugene Bradbury, James Loft, Lewis Patterson, Arthur Loft, Shirley Edmunds, Maxine Ann Ketels, Jacqueline Lenk, and Stanley T. Bagley, added member of the Louhelen committee.

The local Davison township community of Baha'is was listed as 5 people in July 1947. L. W. Eggleston was a member of the 1947 Michigan state regional committee. In December Maye Harvey Gift's talks at Louhelen from the Kitab-i-Iqan were published in World Order.

The winter session for 1947-8 Helen Eggleston served as registrar again - dates were Dec 26-Jan 1, for either $3 or $3.50/day with faculty Curtis Kelsey and Donald Corbin. The winter session rates were $2-$3 per person per day and was going to include a special Youth Day even and present two classes. Returned….

Some year before 1947 one of the buildings collapsed during what was called a tornado, (there was a tornado in Detroit in 1946.) A picture of the original house and area in 1930 and another from 1947 shows the changes.

=== 1948-50s ===
==== 1948 ====
In 1948 three people moved to Davison to aid founding its assembly - Arnold Ketels from Marysville, and George and Mrs. Springston from Flint.

The Ketels worked registration, housing and meals; some money was spent on equipment and repairs, and total income was $4671 with expenses of $4477, and tax-exemption for the school was obtained. The youth session rate was $1.75 per day, and for the general session between $2 and $3 per day - the rates were generally half or less than for Green Acre and less than those of Geyserville. Margaret Yeutter taught the junior youth school in June, which was followed by a general session in later July. John Haggard gave a talk on the Baha'i Temple in August. Michael Jamir, Paul Becker, and Firuz Kazemzadeh taught classes of the junior youth and youth session. Dorothy Beecher Baker spoke at the last session of the summer. People attended from Lansing, and from Florida.

The first "homecoming" was planned for Sep 4-5 of Louhelen alumni. Very likely more than 150 people attended at least for some hrs. The attendees asked the school committee to make it a regular part of the summer program. It was now considered a tradition to begin each day of the session with prayer and meditation. The first program was a concert and then three periods of discussion followed. One was led by Donald Corbin on the history and growth of the administration including a play written by Ruhiyyih Khanum. The next was by Ellsworth Blackwell, his second appearance on campus, on "the challenging requirement". And the last was by Mrs. George A. True, chair of the program committee, with a panel including Edwin Earldley who was chair of the Louhelen maintenance committee reviewing a deep history of the school and operational procedures. A costume party was held the next day with a picnic supper at "the Glen". Alumni sent letters from Switzerland, Brazil, and Japan and audio wire recording were presented - a talk on The Seven Valleys, another to accompany a slide presentation, and from the convention talk about Louhelen. Five alumni Latin American pioneers were also present. A letter of pioneers to Puerto Rico was intended for the Louhelen "homecoming" for alumni arrived too late but was published in Baháʼí News. It was the first year without the founders directly involved with maintenance and conducting functions now taken on by committees. Arnold Ketels was the resident director, and the broad organization of the sessions hed been set by Bertha Hyde Kirkpatrick, now 70 yrs old, though she died in May from a car crash. Others from Olivet, MI, attended.

The 1948-9 committee was Marguerite True, chair, Helen Eggleston, corresponding secretary, Robert Gaines recording secretary, Bertha Hyde Kirkpatrick, Mrs Clinton Wideman, Arnold Ketels, Paul Pettit, Mrs. Addie Miller, and Phyllis Hall. The winter session was advertised, and had Larry Kramer, Alice Bacon, and Elsworth Blackwell as faculty and the Feast of Honor was held in the Eggleston home.

==== 1949-1950 ====
A tentative summary of the 1949 program was published in December 1948 with a teachers training session, two junior youth sessions, a senior youth session, young adult and adult sessions. The plans advanced for the summer 1949 plan as of January. However a period of austerity was imposed for 1949 and 1950 by Shoghi Effendi wherein the summer sessions would not take place at any of the three main Baháʼí schools in order to provide the means to finish the Baháʼí House of Worship (Wilmette, Illinois) for its opening and the priority of the pioneering work in Latin America. Major maintenance was undertaken at the time adding the septic system. A maintenance committee report for 1949-50, composed of Stanley Bagley, chair, Beatrice Earley, secretary, Edwin Eardley, Clinton Wideman, Oscar Ketels and J. Murdoch Eaton, reported that like all Baha'i schools the summer sessions have been closed for 2 years; an inventory process was ongoing and a tenant has been set up in the Eggleston house leased at $75/mth, and the upper floor of the library rented for $400 for four months. In the fall of 1950, Paul Pettit was mentioned on school committee of Louhelen.

==== 1951 ====
After having met the goal of the Temple construction funding, Shoghi Effendi and the national assembly re-opened the three schools for the summer of 1951. A tentative program was announced in March, and finalized in April, as follows: Junior youth session 1 ran July 1–6 had faculty Edna Ketels, Laura and Robert Markovich, and Eulie Horne. Junior youth session 2, July 8–13, had faculty Eunice and John Schurcliff, Wima Ridley and Ella Eaton. General session 1 July 15–20 with faculty Harry Jay, Florence Reeb, and Elizabeth Cheney. General session 2, July 22-7, had faculty Margery McCormick, Archive Tichenor, and Elizabeth Cheney. General session 3, July 22-August 3, had faculty Horace Holley and Alice Bacon. General session 4, August 5–10, had faculty Terah Cowart-Smith, Ellsworth Blackwell, and Harlan Ober. General session 5, August 12–17, had faculty Marzieh Gail, John Robarts, and Curtis Kesley. Senior youth session, August 19–24, had faculty Richard Nolan, Marguerite True, and Marzieh Gail. The young adult session had faculty Borah Kavelin, Elsie Austin and Audrey Windheiser. Each session would begin with a social gathering and end with public meetings. Rates for room and board per day varied from $2.25 to $4. There would be a homecoming session September 2–3 scheduled to be run by Paul Pettit, Michael Jamir, and the Lansing Baha'i community. The maintenance and program committees for Louhelen met at the Bagley home in Flint in March. A significant decision was to offer child care for children 4 yrs old or older for parents attending sessions at a discount from the regular rates - probably half the regular cost. As all the sessions were centered on published texts, individuals were encouraged to bring their own copies but could buy then at the school - to facilitate the aim of "a profound study of the Faith, and not mere wide, but superficial, surveys." The maintenance committee was hoping to provide hot water showers for the first time, and was looking for volunteers to help clean up before the sessions. Clinton and Mrs Wideman served as joint managers of the school. Among those who presented about the African focus of pioneering were Robert Wolff, Ernest Welsing, Larry Hautz, Matthew Bullock, Ellsworth Blackwell, and John Robarts. Baha'is attended for Port Huron, MI, and talks about one or another of the faculty were covered in one or another newspaper. The Homecoming event included Baháʼís from Lansing - Richard and Mrs. Nolen, William H and Mrs. Smith, Sophia Butterfield, Calvin Tillman, Gordon and Mrs. Fraser, and Fauna Taylor. A letter from the national assembly summarized the 1951 summer season - an attendance of 360 people, $600 worth of Baha'i literature sold, a total income of $3922 and costs of $3241 during the school though these did not cover advance costs and insurance. Two letters on behalf of Shoghi Effendi were written to youth sessions and were published in March 1952, and reiterated in December. Another letter was published in 1998 from that summer school session as well. Vera Esinhart attended Louhelen supporting the nursery.

For the fall of 1951 the committee of Ernest and Mrs. Benner, Mrs. Bruce Thomas, Mrs. Charlie Lenk, Mrs. O. J. Ketels and daughter Maxine, and Elizabeth Knill, gathered to plan for the next season's cycle of presentations. Vera D. Esinhart was back to work in the nursery. Faculty include Mrs. Bagley, and her husband Stanley.

The 1951-2 winter school had a session December 23-5 on effective study of Baha'i scriptures, and another was held December 28 - January 1 with three topics - early history, coming history, and living in the present. Grethen Westervelt was the guest of O J and Mrs. Ketels.

==== Egglestons ====
In the spring of 1951, Louhelen Eggleston had attended from Western Michigan University,(WMU) where she worked on the campus Herald newspaper. Lou Eggleston was profiled in the local news late in 1951. and again in March 1952. Lou died the next year. September 11, 1953 a telegram was sent on news of the death of Eggleston. Nevertheless the farm was noted selling 5 lb bags of wheat flour in 1953, and 1958. Louhelen Eggelston graduated in 1953 from WMU with a BA in Business Education, was the historian recorder of the Beto Iota chapter of the Kappa Delta Pi honor society and a member of Future Teachers of America.

==== 1952 ====
Summer 1952 started with a junior youth session. W. Kenneth Christian of Michigan State University, Harlan and Mrs. Ober, and Elizabeth Kidder, and Horace Holley were among the faculty while attendees came from Port Huron, MI, and a group came from Peoria, IL: Richard and Mrs. Wright, Ann Liner and son Michael, Sallie Kinsinger, Pearle Easterbrook, Zoe Meyer, Esther Wilson, June Miller and Imogene Talbott. Later summer faculty included Ruth Moffett, Archie Titchenor, Pearl Easterbrook, William Randolph Lacey, Helen Eggleston, Ellsworth Blackwell, Etta Catlin were faculty in later July, followed by Ruth Moffett, Helen Eggleston, Peggy True, and Lawrence Hautz progressively through August. A picture of attendees of one of the sessions was published in Baháʼí News in October, and a color slide set with script was published for the "Louhelen story" in December.

==== 1953 ====
January 1953 Richard Gaines was chair of the Louhelen committee.

The summer 1953 tentative program was announced in March. The sessions outlined included Baha'i history, arts and crafts, and comparative religion, Gleanings from the Writings of Baháʼu'lláh, a Baha'i appreciation of geography, family relations, the UN, Islam, and pioneering. Matthew Bullock was scheduled for a program on "The New Africa." Advertising for the sessions included in The Chicago Defender. The 1953 Flint–Beecher tornado passed through the area in June a few miles to the north. Despite the damage in the area, the school opened. Hands of the Cause Taráz'u'lláh Samandarí and Shuʼáʼu'lláh ʻAláʼí visited the junior youth session. Richard Nolen gave a talk for the Centenary of 1953 (1853) and coverage mentioned he was both chair of Assembly and vice chair of the Louhelen committee. Attendees came from Hamburg, NY, Lawrence Hautz and MSU professor Bennet were among the faculty - the Wayne State student newspaper and others noted a UN oriented talk. Robert Wolff, Margaret Ruhe, Florence Reeb taught classes, while Mary Georgia attended from Binghamton, NU. Later sessions included on Islam by Elizabeth Cheney, and Jon Faily on Iran.

The winter session was published in December aimed at the topic of the World Crusade with Rebecca Wideman as registrar. Mrs Dudley Blakely taught in the winter session.

==== 1954 ====
Mrs. Marvin Nochman of WSU was among the early faculty advertised for the 1954 season, and the program committee of Laura Post, Helen Eggleston, Lestor Long, and William Lacey was announced.

The declared priority of the 1954 season was for the Ten Year Crusade with a line of action on children on the religion, arts and crafts, and recreation, so that parents could attend sessions, and a daily introduction to the religion was set for any speakers; all from July 5 to Sep 3. Ona Koppe shared events when she returned to Ohio, while local coverage in Port Huron mentioned Laurence Hautz giving a talk with color slides. Quentin Farrand from Lansing also spoke. while a Baháʼí attended Magengo, IL. Weekly meetings were established approaching mid-August and Lois Nochman gave a talk. A larger group of Baháʼís from Hamburg, NY, attended: James B. and Mrs. McCloskey, sons of Eugene and Mrs. Thorpe - Keith and David - Harry and Mrs. Pringle and daughter Bonnie, Nemat Borhani, Marion Joseph, Hbarjan Hayre, George Peng, and John Holby. Ellsworth Blackwell both represented the NAACP and the Baha'i Faith at a presentation. In the summer of 1954, newly designated Auxiliary Board member Margery McCormick visited among Michigan and other state travels, along with William deForge.

The first state wide convention of Baháʼís held at Louhelen attracted 160 attendees in early December. The following winter session was set to review the Crusade, the Guardianship, and Some Answered Questions. with faculty Edith McLaren, Bert Rakowski, and Marjorie McCormick.

==== 1955 ====
The program for the summer 1955 season was published in May. It started with a Central States area teaching conference July 2–4, followed immediately by a junior youth session July 5–15, and then an institute for child education July 16–17. A general family session was set July 18–29, then a two day session on Islam, a second general family session August 1–5, and a 2 day session on Israel. Then a third family session, a weekend on pioneering, a fourth general session, a weekend on public relations, a senior youth session August 22-September 2, and the homecoming session September 3–5 rounded out the summer. The family sessions would include children's programs as well. Violet Wuerfel was chair of the program committee and general members were Robert Gaines, Dorothy Hoffman, Helen McClusky, Katherine Mills, Lois Nochman, and Joe Zabelski.

That winter Grace von der Heydt came from SC.

Louhelen Eggleston, daughter of Lou and Helen, joined the committee late early in 1955. The February 1955 issue of Baháʼí News presented a call for new teachers and courses. That year Dempsey and Adrienne Morgan joined the religion while they attended a session. That spring Louhelen hosted a multi-faith panel of Wayne State students - Muslim, Hindu and Buddhist - while Jane Faily presented about the Baha'is.

Baháʼís attended from Port Huron, MI, and Mattoon, IL. Joseph Zabelski, Ruth Moffett, and Hamilton Niss were among the faculty. The summer season had more than 200 attended the summer sessions and their names sent back to their area assemblies to aide promoting activities in their home areas. Auxiliary Board member William deForge attended as well. Lynn Markovich Bryant recalled attending in 1956 as well.

Enthusiasm of a youth conference led to another in November.

1955-6 winter session was announced, and included a talk by Sam Clark of the board of Louhelen.

==== 1956 ====
As of January 1 the school was renamed "Davison Baha'i School". The 25th summer session of the school was held in 1956 and a brief program outline was published in March. An increased budget was allotted to Louhelen for repairs in later April, perhaps related to the widespread storms in early April more damaging on the eastern side of the state.

This year family sessions were the norm instead of separate sessions for youth. The first general session ran July 1–14 for topics Baha'i heroes and Assemblies; the second session ran July 15–21 on the Kitab-i-Iqan, Shoghi Effendi as Guardian, and researching for talks; session 3 ran July 22-8 with stories of ʻAbdu'l-Bahá; session 4 was on the Baha'i view of progressive revelation and our relationship with God; session 5 was in mid-August 12-8, for firesides on the topic of the writings of the central figures of the religion; session 6 was on progressive revelation, the Covenant of Baháʼu'lláh, a choir, and homecoming September 1–3. The subject of the Baháʼís covenant was underscored in another report. Harlan Ober returned for the anniversary week event July 29-August 1, along with Stanwood Cobb. Hamilton Niss was also a faculty. Attendees came including from Iowa, and New York.

The winter session was held with four courses of study.

==== 1957 ====
The 1957 program committee was David Baral, Stanley Brogan, Sam Clark, Phyllis Hall, Hamilton Niss, Lois Nochman, Ralph Peotter Jr, Jane Rowe, Donald T. Streets, and Violet Wuerfel. Nochman was elected secretary. An additional event in 1957 was the first Baha'i sponsored Brotherhood of Negro History Week in Port Huron with Helen Eggleston representing the Baháʼí among a panel that included along with University of Michigan students of Muslim and Buddhist, Catholics, protestant and Latter Day Saints, and Jews Mrs. Dempsey Morgan, who had joined the religion at Louhelen in 1955 gave a presentation on "History of the Negro Race".

Summer sessions would include children and all-family sessions, jr youth, and senior youth, with costs ranging from $3 to $4 per day per person. The registrar was Judy Long. Among the faculty was Maude A. Tollefson.

Baháʼí from Washtenaw County were noted among those attending the state convention in early December, followed by the winter session with several attendees from Port Huron.

==== 1958 ====
The 1958 school committee was Stanley Brogan, chair, Lois Nochman, secretary, and members Wallace Baldwin, Elizabeth Brogan, Phyllis Hall, Lester Long, Mabel Long, Betty Weston and Violet Wuertel.

Six sessions were held. Early session faculty included Ellsworth Blackwell, and Rob Jacobs, and attendees came from Port Huron Later session faculty included Mrs. Leo Weston, former minister A. S. Petchold, and Winston Evans. Over 325 people registered for the summer courses, managed by Elva and Mrs. Green and program director was Etta Catlin. Faculty for later session included Lois Nochman, Marjorie Brown, Edith McLaren, Michael Jamir, John and Madeline Byers, Robert and Elinor Wolff, and music direction by Esther Wilson, with subjects like problems facing Christian culture, and youth sessions specifically included socialization with members of other races. Speakers for public talks included Ellsworth Blackwell, Pearl Easterbrook, Robert Gaines, A. S. Petzoldt, Ruth Moffett, Bula Mott Stewart, Ron Jacobs, and Betty Weston and Winston Evans. Ruth Moffett was also there.

The winter state convention again noted Baháʼís from Port Huron attending. The winter session afterwards had registrar Alice Luther and a rate of $4/day. The program featured Christian topics. An attendee also came from Illinois.

==== 1959 ====
In 1959 high school junior Paula Akemann gave a talk in Indiana with the newspaper mention noting she had attended Louhelen school 5 years. The school went on with the return of Bill Sears, (first present in 1937 and last in 1947, now returned to America and as a Hand of the Cause,) and Mrs. W. W. Robinson too.

Attending the December state convention at Louhelen were Baháʼís from Port Huron.

=== 1960s ===
The earlier 1960s the school sessions had relatively little coverage. Sessions in 1960 were held. Faculty across the summer included George Winder, Curtis Kelsey, Ludmila Van Sombeek, Ruth Williams, and Mrs. John Honnold. The late session began in later August.

At the 1961 session George and Mrs. Winder were some of the faculty, and Baháʼís from Port Huron were noted attending the state convention.

In 1962 Mrs. Williams was among the faculty and coverage noted she had had experience from Frogmore, SC. Rates for the 1962 summer course ranged from $2.25 to $4.75 There was a month long session, that included a rally on race unity with participants giving reports on inter-racial problems including from Donald Streets, Riaz Khadem, Richard Reid, Rhea Akermann, and music for the event given by Eddy Blue. 250 Baha'is gathered September 2 to hear Allan Ward review ʻAbdu'l-Bahá's journey in America.

That fall an advertising campaign promoted the claims of Baháʼu'lláh in Detroit associated with some meetings organized by Winston Evans, and the contact point in all the advertisements was the Louhelen School. Advertisements continued into the later Fall.

1963 Paul Pettit on Louhelen school committee, Keith Thorp talks at meeting, taught at Davison (Louhelen) and Geyserville schools. attended Louhelen Baha'i School, taught classes George and Jean McLaughlin. Gerald Curwin director of Louhelen.

In January 1963, Louhelen Eggleston married Charles Hassan in Detroit Michigan. She was still alive in 2009, having earned master's degree in 1988 in public history at the University of San Diego. Her brother Lewis W. "Buzz" Eggleston Jr. died in 2002 in Greenville, SC.

==== 1964 ====
In 1964 a project developed among the Baháʼís supporting race unity - the same period as the Freedom Summer campaign - with connections at Louhelen and the burgeoning Baháʼí community of Greenville, SC. The civic society there was integrating its schools that Fall. Training sessions for a project were noted in the Baháʼí News in August at Louhelen. Some 80 youth attended the training in mid-June. The faculty included Dan and Mrs. Jordan, Jack McCants, Firuz Kazemzadeh, Sarah Pereira, Bettija Walker, Douglas Martin, Jamison Bond, George F. Hutchon, Richard Thomas, Albert Porter, Irvine Lourie, Glenford Mitchell, Alyce Earl, Charles Abercrombie, Ruth Perrin, Ken Jeffers, Richard Greeley, and Tom Hooper, plus youth faculty of Robert Walker, Douglas Ruhe, Roger Williams, with management by Emanuel Reimer and Virgil Ghant, and administration by David and Mrs. Ruhe. After the classes in various subjects 27 individuals went to 8 locations: Greenville, SC, Atlanta, GA, locations in MN, NM, AZ, MI and DC. Six youth went to Greenville under the sponsorship of the local assembly for a 6 week program. Karl Borden, Edson Hockenbury, Marian Parmelee, Douglas Ruhe, Patsy Sims were joined by Richard Thomas, and local youth Eddie Donald, Curtis Butler, the Abercrombies, William Smith, (whom Richard Thomas later collaborated with,) and Steven Moore. They worked on tutoring some 55 blacks students about to attend newly integrating schools, rural proclamation of the religion, and human rights activities focused on the black minority. The work was capped with a parent-teacher banquet reception at a church and a picnic for the students conducted by the Baháʼí teachers. Firesides were held widely in rural areas around Greenville which featured singing, and the group supported petitioning for the public swimming pool being integrated.

==== 1965 ====
There were some local newspaper stories and photographs about Louhelen in August 1965. Thelma Cooley, Linda Drake, Glenn Morgan, Susan McMann, Gregory Dahl and Richard Kochman went to Indianapolis to staff a project promoting the religion from Louhelen. They specifically reached out to Haughville, a low-income black community, and two middle-income integrated and white areas. Some 550 homes were visited, 150 contacts made, 35 serious inquiries were made, 10 undertook what was felt to be serious study of the religion, and seven joined the religion. Susan McMann extended her stay in the area. Later another team of Carolyn, Linda and Susan Drake, Terence and Sheila Amerson undertook a public meeting and group discussions in Racine, WI, following their stay at Louhelen.

==== 1967 ====
A larger photo of youth attendees was published in Baháʼí News from their conference in later March, 1967. Over 100 youth attended the session. Messages were received from the Universal House of Justice, Hands of the Cause, and the National Assembly of the Baháʼís of the United States. The main subject of the session was around the June 1966 message from the House reviewing significant Baháʼí youth from the earlier period of Baháʼí history as well as more contemporary history, the processes Baháʼís see of construction and destruction going on in the world, the spiritual nature of humanity, dedication in life, the tests foreseen in the World Order of Baháʼu'lláh by Shoghi Effendi and the difference and relationship of the Baháʼí views of revelation and knowledge. Auxiliary Members Velma Sherrill, Don Streets, Hamilton Niss, and Peter Khan assisted.

== More recent development ==
The 40th year program for the summer of 1972 included a visit by Hand of the Cause Ali-Akbar Furutan. The Homecoming weekend had faculty George Frye and Kay Harris sharing their expereiences in the South,(see for example Baháʼí Faith in South Carolina,) and then moved into the surrounding area including the Vassar area.

The school was closed by the National Assembly in 1974 for unsafe conditions in building(s).

Helen Eggleston died in 1979.

== Reconstruction ==
In the late 1970s, Louhelen underwent tremendous change, removing older buildings and erecting new ones.

The meeting of the national assembly of the Baháʼís in May 1980 approved the restoration concepts and proceeded to raise money. Ground breaking began September 1, 1980, hoping to re-open in 1981 for its 50th anniversary. The Library was to be repurposed as an archives, the former auditorium would become a storage building and the main original buildings would be restored to the 1930s form. The Pullman dormitory and four cottages would be demolished. The new buildings would include a lodge center with kitchen, lounge, bookstore, and admin offices. A new classroom building would have 5 classrooms with their own external patio, an arts/crafts room, and a nursery. Housing would be provides with 24 suites with space for 130 people.

In 1981 plans for the reconstruction of Louhelen were approved. Fundraising was in the form of promissary notes issued by the Baha'i national treasury over the previous year. The 50th anniversary of Louhelen school was held; Magdalene Carney gave a talk - attendees from Lansing included Lisa Irish, Steven Gonzales, Michigan State professors Richard and June Thomas, Robert and Candice Voight, and Eric Harmsen. Others attended from Port Huron. In 1982 final construction was proceeding. The experience at Louhelen was used in a 1984 renovation of the Baha'i Temple by Frederick McCoy. Some 1000 Baha'is attended the grand re-opening of the renovated Louhelen school in October 1982, also attended by Hand of the Cause Dhikru'llah Khadem, members of the National Assembly and various committees. A banquet was held with some 480 Baha'is including those who remembered the founders. The new Director of administration was William Deil and the director of academic affairs was Geoffrey W. Marks. One of the days was devoted to reviewing the school and a number of presentations were made: "Lou and Helen Eggleston and the early years of the Louhelen School" by Robert Gaines, "The Development of Plans to Reconstruct Louhelen" by the project committee, "The Reconstruction Project" by Sirouss Binaei, general manager, and "Louhelen as a Center of Baha'i learning" by Marks and Diehl. The renovation project cost $1.9 million and started Sep 6, 1981. The campus had been closed in 1974 because the buildings had reached an unsafe condition, and then after a two year program of raising money with a Faizi Endowment, created in memory of Hand of the Cause Abu'l-Qasim Faizi for the renovation it began. … The school was reformed into a place centered as a conference and retreat center and William Diehl came as its director but specifically set aside a school function - a residential college associated with nearby colleges - UoM@Flint or the local community college and at the time maintained a teaching position at the UoM@F. The first event at the school was a youth conference, the Midwestern Regional Conference of the Association for Baha'i Studies, in November 1982. The local Davison Index noted the construction as well: "New construction and renovation of older building is nearly complete at Louhelen Baha'i School on South State Road in Davison Township. The new school will bring an expected 7,000 members of the Baha'i faith to the Davison area for conference classes and retreats." In 1983, the National Spiritual Assembly opened the buildings which currently comprise Louhelen. This included restoring the original residence to its 1930s form. Two of the original national youth committee, and early attendees at Louhelen, Florence Mattoon Zmeskal, and Sylvia Paine Parmelee, attended the re-opening event.

=== 1980s and 90s ===
Louhelen co-sponsored and hosted a "Marriage Institute" in August, 1983, under Hossain Danesh, a professor at the University of Ottawa as well as a member of the executive committee of the Association for Baha'i Studies, with assistance from professor at the University of Alberta, Glen Eyford, therapists Ruth Eyford and Mary Kay Radpour, and psychiatrist Sam McClellan. About 30 couples, five single people, and 35 children, 45 of whom were Canadian, filled the campus to capacity. Follow-up studies would follow the couples at 6 mths and a year after the institute.

In 1984 Louhelen hosted a conference of youth followed by a conference called by the national assembly in May bringing together members of the Continental Counselors Farzam Arbab, Sarah Martin Pereira, Fred Schechter, and Velma Sherril, working on the Campaign for unified action. A socio-economic development project counted in a survey of projects under the initiative of the Universal House of Justice from 1983 was established in the summer of 1984 at Louhelen. It was called the Center for Interracial Understanding by some Michigan Baha'is with expertise in race relations, education and business. Another project, called a residential college program, was founded at Louhelen in September 1985, and was part of its conception. It was announced in March 1986 it was accepting applications for the September 1986 enrollment combining formal study of the religion with a degree earning study at one or two nearby colleges. Students would live and work at the school, receive training, and go to one of these schools.

In 1985 a symposium was held at Louhelen named We are the world after the song. Another conference held at Louhelen was on "Feminism and Holy Maiden". And Hooper Dunbar spoke at Louhelen in 1985.

Geoffrey Marks was academic director at Louhelen and gave a presentation at the Saginaw Valley State College on Feb 6, 1986.

Martha Diefenbach attended a child education institute at Louhelen and was a co-coordinator of the South Louisiana Baha'i education program called LEAP in 1987.

In 1988 a play on Tahirieh by Louhelen Theater Group performs (two places?). Tahirih play by Louhelen Youth theatre.

For 5 yrs before 1991 Native American culture and grandparents at Louhelen (Baha'i) Conference Center in winter. Apr 1991 Christopher Buck…

The 1990 annual report noted cooperating with the Mid-Western regional committee of the Association for Baha'i Studies and the English Department of the Universityh of Michigan honoring Robert Hayden. The report also mentioned 11 local community groups had been hosted - UoM-Flint weekly Cultural Anthropology class, as well as the regular meetings for the Adult Children of Alcoholics association, a program for multi-cultural awareness for a local bank, and the directory presented talks to literacy programs for the community as well as Bahaʼis from South Carolina.…

Like a desert.

1992 - Rick Johnson (Louhelen). Rick Johnson of Louhelen.

1993 Kate Draves….

1994 Ridvan at Louhelen school, videos shown on tv. Caitlin Rogell, 8 yr old, banner/poster on racism flown; Dorothy Gemmill, inc Louhelen. A program "America's destiny was held in the summer.

Dale Malner held an exhibition there in March 1995.

In the 1990s Heather Cardin considered how to use the curriculum development implemented at Louhelen over at Fort Hays State College.

1996 Peter Murphy already won Louhelen award.

1997 Baha'i wedding of Dawn Vincent and Chad Dumas at Louhelen by directors Barbara and Rick Johnson. Jane Beasley and Cate Vance offer parenting workshops, returned from Louhelen school.

October, 1998, Robert Stockman,

2000-2001 conference and American Baha'is.

Tom Padfield Eagle Scout; service Baha'i workshop, camp counselor, Louhelen counselor.

== 21st century ==
A new auditorium was added in 2001. Students volunteered for a year of service.

In 2003, 'Irfán Colloquium held a conference at Louhelen. The Spiritual Assembly of the Baha'is of Lancaster offered a workshop on "Marriage and Family Life" by Mike and Georgia Keller, for married couples. They trained at the Louhelen Baha'i Core Curriculum Training Center in Davison, Mich.

In October 2004 Irfan Colloquia Session #58 (English) was held at Louhelen Baháʼí School.

In 2006 the Wilmette Institute program moves from Chicago to Louhelen.

In 2007 there was a youth presentation and animator training for Ruhi Institute.

In 2008 Andy Grammer was at Louhelen. There was also a discussion about the Canadian TV production Little Mosque on the Prairie.

In 2009 an interfaith service had attracted enough Native Americans that the events turned into a powwow. Overall some 20,000 people receive some kind of service through Louhelen. A film project was produced.

In 2011 Natalie Guerrero was a youth mentor onsite. In October the ʻIrfan Colloquia was hosted at Louhelen. One of the presentations was recorded.

ʻIrfan colloguia was held onsite in October 2012.

In 2013 a number of youth projects were posted to Youtube.

The Louhelen Library came online, joining the US National Archives of materials, in 2015 listing some 5,700 books.

In 2016, a Facilitative Leadership Workshop for Youth-Serving Professionals & Volunteers was held, as well as the 2016 ʻIrfan colloquia.

In April 2017 the Religion and Society Working Group of the Association for Baháʼí Studies met at Louhelen.
