= David Hofman =

British Baha'i leader

David George Ronald Hofman (23 September 1908 – 9 May 2003) served as a member of the Universal House of Justice, the supreme governing body of the Baháʼí Faith, between 1963 and 1988. He worked as the world's first television presenter for the British Broadcasting Corporation and later founded the publishing company George Ronald.

== History ==
=== Early life and career ===
Mr. Hofman was born in 1908 in Pune, India where his father served in the British Army. Educated in England, as a young man he set out to see the world. While in Canada during the 1930s, he encountered the Baháʼí Faith at the home of May and William Sutherland Maxwell in Montreal. He embraced the religion and continued his travels, living for a time in Hollywood, United States, and appearing in a number of silent movies. Back in England he earned several acting roles in the West End of London and in 1938 was a television announcer on early BBC television transmissions. His voice was also heard on the radio, on the BBC Empire Service.

In 1943 Hofman founded the Baháʼí publishing company George Ronald. Its first title was The Renewal of Civilization, a book he wrote as an introduction to the Baháʼí Faith. Years later he authored a biography of Hand of the Cause George Townshend.

Following World War II he married former US Olympic athlete Marion Holley, who predeceased him. They had two children. The Hofmans were active members of the Baháʼí community, establishing Baháʼí communities in Northampton, Birmingham, Oxford, Cardiff and Watford. Mr. Hofman served for 27 years as a member of the National Spiritual Assembly of the United Kingdom.

== Bibliography ==
- Baháʼu'lláh, the Prince of Peace ISBN 978-0-85398-340-8
- Commentary on the Will and Testament of ʻAbdu'l-Bahá ISBN 978-0-85398-158-9
- George Townshend, A Life ISBN 978-0-85398-126-8
- The Renewal of Civilization ISBN 978-0-85398-007-0 David Hofman was also a member of the Northampton Repertory theatre 1942/1943/1944 an accomplished actor as Lorberg in Ibsens Hedda Gabler, Robert E Sherwoods The Queens Husband as King Eric.and The Petrified Forest.and many others,
