= Garreta Busey =

American college professor (1893–1976)

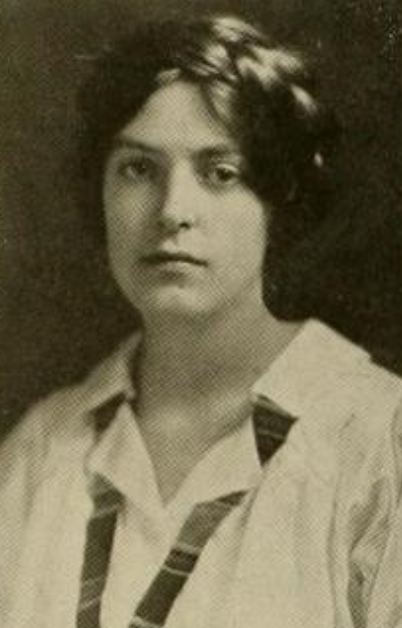
- Garreta Busey, from the 1915 yearbook of Wellesley College
- Born: Garreta Helen Busey; March 1, 1893; Urbana, Illinois
- Died: October 21, 1976 (aged 83); Urbana, Illinois
- Occupations: Writer, professor, bank executive

Garreta Helen Busey (March 1, 1893 – October 21, 1976), sometimes seen as Garetta Busey, was an American college professor, writer, and bank executive based in Urbana, Illinois.

== Early life ==
Busey was born in Urbana, Illinois, the daughter of George W. Busey and Kate Baker Busey. Her father was a bank president. She graduated from Urbana High School in 1911, and from Wellesley College in 1915. She earned a master's degree from the University of Illinois in 1922, with a thesis titled "The reaction of English men of letters of the nineteenth century to the philosophy of Auguste Comte". She completed doctoral studies in English at Illinois in 1924, with a dissertation titled "The reflection of positivism in English literature to 1880; the positivism of Frederic Harrison".

== Career ==
Busey worked with Illinois suffragist Catherine Waugh McCulloch after college, and served in France and Switzerland with the American Red Cross after World War I. She worked in the book review department of the New York Herald Tribune. She was a close friend and correspondent of journalist Isabel Paterson, from their time together at the Herald Tribune.

Busey returned to Urbana for graduate school, and stayed as an English professor at the University of Illinois, on the faculty from 1930 to 1961. She wrote short stories and poems for publication, and one novel, The Windbreak (1938), set in nineteenth-century Illinois. She was vice president of the Commercial Bank of Champaign. and an officer in the local chapter of the Daughters of the American Revolution, She was a mentor to journalist William Maxwell while he was at Illinois.

Busey was a Baháʼí, like her mother before her. She served as faculty advisor of the University of Illinois Bahá'í Club, lectured on Bahá'í topics, and served on editorial staffs for Baháʼí publications from the 1930s through the 1960s. In "A Fresh Stream of Wisdom" (World Order 1947), she wrote, "Survival in this, the most dangerous period of the world's history, requires not the suppression of the will of the individual but its development. Our loyalties must expand to embrace the world instead of its parts".

== Personal life ==
Busey died in Urbana in 1976, aged 83 years. Busey's papers are in the collections of the Champaign County Historical Archives and the University of Illinois. She donated her family house in Urbana to become a Bahá'í Center; it burned down in 1987.
