= Florence Virginia Foose Wilson Mayberry =

American writer

- Born: September 18, 1906
- Died: April 8, 1998 (aged 91)
- Occupation: Writer

Florence Virginia Foose Wilson Mayberry (September 18, 1906 – April 8, 1998) was an American writer and convert to the Baháʼí Faith. After being mostly raised by her grandparents, with her grandfather in particular, having served in the Union Army during the Civil War, she joined the religion at the age of 35. At around the same time, she began writing short fiction, eventually having a long career writing for Ellery Queen's Mystery Magazine. In the religion, her service as a speaker was wide-ranging, and soon she advanced from position to position in the religion as first an Auxiliary Board member and then a Continental Counselor and then one serving at the International Teaching Centre – the highest appointed positions of the religion during her later years. Meanwhile, she was a successful writer with almost 20 years of continuous annual appearance in Ellery Queen's Mystery Magazine and almost half her stories were also anthologized even as late as 2012.

== Early life ==
Born into the Foose/Foos family, her grandfather claimed the "e" was added by a Union Army clerk to his name. Through her grandmother she claimed relation to President Zachary Taylor. However the family was as proud of traveling preacher John Taylor. In her autobiography Mayberry highlights and praises her aunt Charlotte-Mariah whom her exasperated grandmother would occasionally compare her to. Her feisty personality grew up after an era rife with family based abuse of women save in the case of her grandparents. They lived along the Wabash River in Indiana. The family moved to Missouri where the family spent many years. There is a Foose Missouri "intersection" in the vicinity which might have been the site of the grandfather's store.

Her mother Myrtle married at 16 to a 27-year-old Scot, Bill Wilson, Mayberry's father. They lived in Lebanon, Missouri, then the town of Sleeper on the other side of Lebanon from her grandparents. Myrtle eventually divorced him and the family held rumors that father Bill tried to kidnap baby Florence and was caught by her grandfather. Bill was a train station agent.

The family then moved to Texas in Deaf Smith County. Her mother married "a cowboy" while she was raised by her grandparents. Oddly Mayberry remembers her mother calling her "Sister" But this too was a short lived marriage. Then the mother and daughter moved to California to wed Wilbur Walton and the family rented out rooms in San Francisco. They alternated housing a couple times and were still living San Francisco in 1912 near the Golden Gate Park Panhandle. The family had connection to an unnamed Protestant denomination and was very anti-catholic.

Mayberry recalls an event in her autobiography in October 1912 when she was about 6 yrs old. While in the park she encountered a group who tried to invite her to meet some referred to as "Him" near a portal of the park – she later came to believe this to have been people who had accompanied ʻAbdu'l-Bahá, then head of the Baháʼí Faith, whose presence at the park in October 1912 was confirmed. However she could not confirm enough details to prove it specifically. But she recalled them as "My people" though she was called away by her mother even if the welcome was warm.

However they soon went back to Missouri where her grandparents had returned and mother went on to work in St. Louis at the Famous-Barr department store but shortly she returned to live with Wilbur while Florence stayed on with her grandparents until she had a little brother and the whole family moved to Waverly, Missouri. The family became friends several African-Americans: Ollie, a neighboring African-American, and insisted an African-American family eat with them at their kitchen table. There was a "visit" from the social ladies of the town who communicated to them that the norm in the area was in favor of maintaining segregated eating – and her grandfather quipped back, as Mayberry recalled, "Tell your menfolks this. As a boy I fought in the Civil War for Abe Lincoln. The idee was to fix things so black folks are free to be like God wanted 'em to be. Free and equal. A colored man or woman is as good as Becky'n me. In my house they eat at my table, because I eat at my table. And tell your menfolks this, too. I keep a loaded shotgun under my bed. And the first man, or men, steps on my land I bought and paid for to force me or my woman to change how we treat folks on our property will get its full blast. And I reload fast. I thank you, Ladies, and good afternoon." However Florence did not pursue the friendship with Ollie and was put off by her strangeness, but came to regret her lack of friendship in later years.

During her 8th year the family was reunited and they moved to Oakland, California together arriving on her 9th birthday in 1915. She attended the Denman School for girls (see John Swett) and was a steady reader of books and magazines. She told her brother, Richard Walton, of the mysterious meeting by the portal of the park and recalled going to the De Young Museum. And a search for a church for Sunday School was started around her 9th year. A year later she tried Christian Scientist following her mother seeking to overcome her chronic asthma but didn't see a social fit for her as she advanced in studies there. The first World War broke into her awareness in her 11th year followed by the Spanish flu though she and her family recovered, some neighbors didn't.

At fourteen the family briefly moved to Indiana arriving in Newport of Hoosier County where her grandparents then lived. She entered the eight grade there. Then they moved to Fresno, California and during a spell of illness she began to seek God's guidance on what to believe.

There was another temporary separation of her parents and the kids went to stay with the grandparents in Newport. Florence went as a senior to high school in Indiana and also began to teach Sunday school in nursery class and had finished reading the entire Bible as part of her senior English class. She was upset that the church's Sunday school taught that the Bible was literally true. She remembered particularly the Adam-and-Eve story being trouble and was "brought to a half" by the rendering of the story of Jonah. She confronted the local minister that she couldn't accept it as literal "And furthermore" she recalled saying "I will never join any church which leave out any people. Because I believe God made the whole world and all the people in it. I will only join a church which doesn't divide by denominations, color, heathens, nothing, just one for everyone. So I can't teach Sunday School class here any longer."

== Encountering the Baháʼí faith ==
Next her family moved to live with a cousin near Santa Paula, California when Florence was 18 and initially she got a job teaching ballet but switched to joining the local newspaper as a 'society editor' reporter. When she worked there a Baháʼí couple asked to have an article published on 'The unity of mankind'. However the editor's wife working at the newspaper took it from her after they left and tore it in half and threw it away; 'Baháʼís! Crazy kooks!' Florence later recalled her saying. She retrieved the papers and read them herself noting the informational meeting was going to be a C. E. Carpenter's home with a speaker from Los Angeles coming. Elizabeth Carpenter kept offering articles and despite they weren't published she and Florence became friends. During a break in the editor's wife presence Florence was able to get one piece in the paper and it continued after her return initially without comment. And news came a daughter was to marry a Persian, Sheikh Ali Yazdi, in 1926.

Eventually the editor's wife asked Florence to do a piece on the religion. However Florence could not remember any details when or what she wrote when she wrote her autobiography. However see a newspaper story appeared only a few months later.

Florence's mother and brother rejoined Wilbur Walton in Stockton, California. Around then her grandfather-cum-father died in Indiana. It was also around this time when the family met the Kanno Takisha Japanese family who it turned out later had met ʻAbdu'l-Bahá in Oakland in 1912. Soon after the family including Florence moved to Las Vegas around the time the Boulder Dam (later renamed Hoover Dam) was being built, (roughly 1930–1935.) And then they moved to Reno, Nevada. Richard went to Los Angeles to attend an art school. At this time she had a Catholic friend but she couldn't reconcile down to a denomination that excluded others.

Then the family moved to Hollywood, California while her brother was in art school and she had an under-study part in a play. But lacking an economic connection they moved back to Santa Paula where she learned short-hand, and then she moved to Reno Nevada again.

=== Reno ===
Her spiritual search remained unfocused and unguided though she prayed for it. Soon she was working at the post office and met David Mayberry whom she married four weeks later. His grandparents were Mormon converts but he had no great personal attachment to the denomination. They were married July, 1935. Later while visiting her mother in Santa Paula, she and her mother engaged in conversation on a serious pursuit of religion and she recalled encountering the Baháʼí Faith to her mother. They found the Carpenter family and went to a fireside informational meeting by the family's daughter-in-law, Marzieh Gail. This was the daughter of well known Baháʼí, Ali Kuli Khan. Florence was not convinced on several points but left with a copy of "Bahaʼi Scriptures" but did not read it immediately – indeed she left it for two years. In the meantime the Mayberry family moved outside of Reno into a new home and Elizabeth Carpenter surprised her with a visit having directions from her husband. Carpenter was returning from attending US Baháʼí national convention and after the visit she gave a brief review of a random page. A few months later her husband reported a Baháʼí took a job at the post office and that a traveling Bahaʼi speaker needed help finding a venue in Reno for a talk she would give – this was Mamie Seto. The Mayberry's assisted and appreciated Seto and her talk. Following it they bought a copy of Bahaʼu'lláh and the New Era but it was not a memory of importance that they read it and commented on reading it. This might have been noted in the June 1939 edition of Baháʼí News. A few months earlier Florence published her first known piece – a Christmas story – in Feb 1939 but was thought to have been a man.

Baháʼí Helen Grifting moved to Reno and invited the Mayberrys over to dinner. She became a companion on many family outings and through her presence the Mayberrys began to read their now two Baháʼí books but did not think had to belong to a religion. They attended Helen's fireside talks regularly along with her mother and brother and his new wife. They heard presentations by returning pilgrims and international travelers. Mayberry recalled one night that based on her conversation someone at a bar asked her when she had joined the religion and then finding she hadn't quizzed her what was wrong with it that she hadn't? She was guilty she had been at a bar too even if she was a casual social "drinker". After some time she interrupted her day and drove off in the car to demand a "declaration card" from Helen at her work but Helen urged caution – "Are you sure?" She waited. In Sept 1939 Helen notes in Baháʼí News that there were "excellent contacts", "many friends", and three had gone to the Geyersville Summer school, (later moved and named the Bosch Baháʼí School).

The Mayberry's moved from an apartment near a golf course to a cottage – around the same time Helen had to downsize her apartment. Wanting to be of assistance and enjoying the meetings the Mayberry's took out a wall so they could have one big room and volunteered to host meetings. Mayberry wrestled over personally praying if mostly they were "gimme" prayers vs the given Baháʼí prayers which were for people in general and full of "eloquent imagery, strange to the tongue". In 1940 Florence recalled going on a trip and stopping in Wilmette and seeing the House of Worship there under construction. This might have been her trip to see F.D. Roosevelt at the democratic national convention – she attended.

Then there was an incident reported in Mayberry's autobiography. Her mother had befriended an African American lady – the couple had been wakened by police and arrested her husband all with rough treatment and language normal of the day. The next day his employer defended his character and he was released. The next day Florence called the Mayor's office, then the chief of police and arguments with them equated prejudice with anti-American behavior, asking that an apology be made public, and the couple received an apology. As a result, Florence was asked to speak at the local AME church. She settled on the story recalling Ollie to tell her audience and her sorrow at not fulfilling a friendship with her – it was a healing for her too.

Florence then went through an experience May 1941. She felt an intense need to clean her home. She did a good job – and then found herself very upset and (in mid yell) called herself a hypocrite for not joining the Baháʼí Faith. She called her husband and announced she was joining the religion. He said "when you ask for your membership card, ask for two." That night her brother's family also joined the religion. The next morning her mother did as well. In October Baháʼí News noted the Reno community had 6 adults (so Helen plus these five) and hoped to elect an assembly soon. The community had been founded a decade earlier when Gertrude Frazier first moved to Reno. Seven adults were noted in Oct 1942. with the arrival of Eleanor Adler in July. Further meetings were held and Mayberry says she gained a greater depth of appreciation of the history of the religion in the East and the West. The declaration of Robert Takeshi Imagire in 1942 at the Mayberry home made the 9th member of the community and a Local Spiritual Assembly, the foundational administrative institution of the religion, was elected. Later Imagire was inspired by one of Florence's poems to make a painting. Gladys was chair of the assembly and Florence secretary by December 1944. In 1945 Florence was on the regional committee.

The US entered World War II in December and both brother and husband were drafted – her brother was found to have a birth defect and was excused from service. Her husband asked for non-combatant status as a Baháʼís and was assigned to the Army Postal Field Service.

David Mayberry was on a regional committee by July 1943.

Florence got a job with the US Employment Service. November Florence was the Fair Employment Practices Committee consultant in the area. Together they had their first child March 24, 1945. Fireside gatherings grew larger. When the Reno community of Bahaʼis reached nine they elected their first assembly. Assembly noted in 1947.

=== Santa Paula ===
With discharge from the military the family moved to Santa Paula though she found that the Carpenters had moved away. Both Mayberry's found jobs in the shifting economy and their son Michael was minded by grandmother Myrtle. Florence became a secretary-manager of the Chamber of Commerce when the manager left. The Santa Paula community was highly agricultural and had a significant population of immigrant farm workers. She worked with directors of the Chamber of Commerce to bring together the white and Latino communities into a united Fiesta Parade rather than the traditional segregated practice. And they found that another Baháʼí family in the area – the children of the first Japanese Baháʼís.

In the fall of 1945 she had her first poem published – it was in Common Ground magazine and was called "Adam's Black Boy" was about a black man oppressed and begging – the poem ran over a page.

A notice in the newspaper has her giving a talk November 1946 in Los Angeles at their Baháʼí Center. In the coming years both her writing and talks were gathering attention.

Florence was noticeable next as the chair of the Southern California/Arizona regional committee of Baháʼís in 1947, and also gave talks at the LA Baháʼí Center. Both Mayberry's served on the western states committee of 1949. She was also the secretary of the Santa Paula Chamber of Commerce in 1948. Florence increasingly began to give talks but soon found she had a medical condition arise. It proved to be an enormous test after the initial operation which developed into experiences of great pain and multiple operations over two years. Following this she applied to the University of California at Los Angeles. She says she did well in philosophy. She also began to take up poetry as an exploration of faith.

In 1950 she was mentioned having published a novel. She also gave a talk at the LA Center for Ridván, a pivotal holy day in the Baháʼí calendar.

She wrestled with understanding Shoghi Effendi's leadership as head of the religion when coming out of her Protestant Christian context the Popes were considered trouble. Despite ʻAbdu'l-Bahá being an even higher leader of the religion, she didn't have a problem with that because she saw him as the ultimate grandfather. She had begun and continued to focus on the special station of the Guardianship held by Shoghi Effendi and gained an emotional attachment and decided to write to him. She outlined her recent activity, trials and achievements. The response encouraged her public speaking as well as study of the Baháʼí teachings themselves; and he commented that there was "a real lack in the Cause of people who know the teachings thoroughly, especially the deeper truths."

Florence debated her pursuit of a college degree vs her role in public speaking and worried, feeling also that her studies of the religions' teachings had been impatient and was attracted to the idea of having the teachings "imbedded" into her awareness. She decided to drop her pursuit of a degree and focused on a close study of the Writings and be able to respond to any call for a speaker for the religion.

She gave a talk she gave for World Religion Day in Fresno in 1952. She also published a short story – "Kiko" which was collected in the best fiction of 1953.

== Traveling speaker and writer on the side ==
=== US South, Convention and Conference ===
She gave a talk in January 1953 at the LA center and in Fresno for Ridvan, 1953. In early spring of 1953 a letter arrived from the US National Spiritual Assembly asking her if she could "undertake a fortnight's teaching trip through several Southern States."(these are Florence's words as she recalled in her autobiography.)And she had also given a talk at the Geyersville Bahaʼi Summer School. She recognized one of the students of the class as signing the letter asking for the trip and she soon headed off by train. She felt it went well but offers no details in her autobiography other than the cultural encounter with Southern warmth on the one hand and segregation on the other. Following the trip she was able to attend the national convention for the 1953 jubilee of the declaration of Baháʼu'lláh's first revelatory experience (in the Síyáh-Chál) and one of the conferences on the spread of the religion held May 2, 1953. The American Conference also featured a chance to meet Shoghi Effendi's wife, Rúhíyyih Khanum, then a newly appointed Hand of the Cause. She reflected on stories of her from her meeting ʻAbdu'l-Bahá at 2 yrs old and exploits of her "youthful daring, originality of thought, her profound love of nature and animals, and her great courage in teaching." This was also her chance to see the finished House of Worship she had seen more than a decade earlier. The convention and conference were held at Chicago's Medinah Temple. Florence attended as a guest, not a delegate. She was strongly affected by the multi-racial delegates and the talks. Several Hands of the Cause attended and the audience rose to their feet when Ruhiyyih Khanum was introduced to speak. Afterwards, in divisions of about 1600 people at a time, painted portraits of the Báb and Baháʼu'lláh were viewed and from which she recalled the personal trials the young men were to go through and their personal refinement.

=== Western Canada ===
Upon her return home the family business adjusted and Florence became the office clerk for the business. About the same time a letter arrived from the NSA of Canada asking her for a speaking trip in Western Canada for a month. On presenting the letter to her husband she offered to decline the invitation. He recounted a promise he had made to God that if she lived "we would dedicate your whole life to the service of His Cause. So if you don't go to Canada I'll have to break my promise to God."

She observed a lot of similarities between the Americans and Canadians, while also distinctions of language details and the prevalence of hot tea. She noted both had "shoved aside the Indian owners of the land, a problem both were still struggling to amend." She says in her autobiography some of her talks were over kitchen tables and some in halls and universities. She commented on her own now-perceived slow progress to the religion "I could now be grateful for my own slow entry; I could understand and empathize with them.… Some, indeed, appeared as hard-headed, excuse-making as I had been during my search for Truth.… and I would never be able to spiritual boast about my perceptions." Her Canadian travels went from British Columbia to Manitoba where she met Angus Cowan, later a Counsellor she served with. She returned through the northwest states in abbreviated version some of which were noted in newspapers.

=== Eastern Canada ===
Upon return to Santa Paula and soon after arriving the Canadian assembly asked her for a similar tour of Eastern Canada which her family supported. Most stops this time were one-night stops and most travel was by bus. Often talks were variously from lunch time on to various afternoon events then a break until evening. Then the next day on to the next stop. The pace taxed her strength and she recalled climbing bus steps "crab-like", hauling her projector and slide collection. During the trip in Toronto one audience member challenged her on the topic of the Anti-Christ and it was the first time she had had the question from the public. Her answer silenced him and he sat down – she had referred to "…anyone, even a Christian declaring fealty to Jesus Christ, who denies that [returned] Holy Spirit is Anti-Christ. Baháʼís believe Baháʼu'lláh is that Return."

She continued on to Montreal remarking it was especially the region of the home of Ruhiyyih Khanum and where ʻAbdu'l-Bahá visited and Shoghi Effendi in his authority as head of the religion designating the Maxwell home as a national shrine. News reached her in 1954 of the death of Hand of the Cause Dorothy Beecher Baker who had died the year before. To Mayberry Backer seemed to inspire her all the more and recalled hearing her voice "Spirit is never lost, it persists evanescent, seeking open vessels. Irresistibly it flows into any ready receptor, adding spirit unto spirit."

Then flying onward to Prince Edward Island there was a greater sense of her being seen as a foreigner – she was told even mainland Canadians were called foreigners and when she arrived at the airport no one appeared to be there to greet her. Others waiting turned out to be waiting for her though they thought she would be gray-haired and she was young (at 47.) Then she did not feel like a foreigner and being welcomed into various groups save for an altercation from a returned logger whose regular bathroom had been assigned to her use as the only female guest of the hotel. A note her talk made the local papers, (though it mistakenly assigns the date to 1952.)

From there she went south to Boston, then Washington, D.C., and Alexandria VA and there met Ali-Kuli Khan, father of the Marzieh who had given her her first fireside, Mariam Haney, Paul Haney then Chair of the US National Assembly in February 1954 just before he was appointed as a Hand of the Cause. She also made it to Wilmington Delaware, Baltimore Maryland, and Prescott Arizona on the way home.

=== Auxiliary Board for the Americas ===
Upon return to Santa Paula she was informed that as the elected delegate to the national convention had moved away she as runner-up, and was now the delegate.

At first thinking she would end the first night of the convention early being weary from her travels she changed her mind when it was brought to her attention that the three Hands responsible for North America were to speak and their nine appointments of their new auxiliary assistants to be announced. She was shocked to hear her name as the fourth on their list. She seemed to not be well known in the auditorium and went to the podium to introduce herself to Horace Holley. The Americas (North and South) were split into 9 regions for the auxiliary board and there would be no salary, minimal travel expenses, and they were to avoid any sense of appearing to be clergy. Her region included Western Canada, the US from the Pacific to the Mississippi River plus Alaska and Hawaii. She began to study more intensively and struggled between warming to the encouragement and the warnings of ego in the writings of the religion. Eventually she also learned that it was excessive to spend "too much time and emotional strength over self-guilt and recriminations." By August she was on the program at Geyserville Baháʼí School. After the conference she began a tour that gradually grew into a widespread journey - leaving Chicago heading west and variously north or south, then north along the Pacific coast with occasional visits to the Atlantic and deep south. In the Fall she spoke in Alberta Canada Montana, as well as Spokane, Washington, She was on KXLF-TV and KBOW radio in Montana. An updated on her travels in February noted she had already been in Montana, Washington, Idaho, Oregon, Washington, with Nevada, Arizona, New Mexico, Texas, Utah, Colorado and Wyoming coming up.

March 21, 1954, Florence Mayberry was on a panel of Baha'is on the Church Women's News, A Radio Program, by Ruth S. Norman, in West Virginia.

==== The rest of the 50s and pilgrimage ====
===== Trips =====
In January and in February Mayberry went to Oregon to give a talk, then California. In March she started in Albuquerque, and then during Baháʼí Naw Ruz (the new year day of the Baháʼí calendar), she gave several talks around Gallup, New Mexico that made the local newspaper and went back to Albuquerque. Then Utah and Idaho in April.

In June there is a notice Mayberry was meeting with the group United American Indians in Spokane, one of the early official contacts between the Baháʼí Faith and Native Americans.

Her first trip to Alaska came July 1955. Several meetings were held around Fairbanks in July. In August she helped dedicate the national Baháʼí center for Alaska, a region recognized by the Baháʼís with its own national community. Various local papers covered events. Then she proceeded south through Canada for the summer school in Geyserville Baháʼí School. Her list of travels by May in the Baháʼí News included across southern Canada to Manitoba, then south into North Dakota and then west to Washington, south and back across the western states from October through December. In February and March she was in several meetings on various of the Hawaiian Islands and was interviewed on KMVI. Then in later March she was in Milwaukee Wisconsin at a northern suburb Whitefish Bay, and at the Milwaukee Baha'i center, then north to Oshkosh. By mid-May she was in a home in Galveston giving a talk. By late May she was attending the national convention giving reports on what has happened. By the summer of 1956 she was giving local talks closer to home while she developed a traveling seminar, and was aiding in coordinating urgent meetings in Seattle and Los Angeles. Still she made a quick trip to Alaska. before rounding out her trip among the lower 48 in the north-west. before returning to her home are for one last talk in the season.

===== Pilgrimage =====
On her most recent a visit to Billings, Montana, a local Baháʼí challenged her to plan to go on Baháʼí pilgrimage despite her economic limits. She was soon offered pilgrimage for Fall 1956 but was delayed by the Suez Crisis. However, when that was over she was alerted while visiting Yakima, Washington by a call from her husband that she had been offered to go in April 1957. In between she gave a talk in Eugene, Oregon.

She encountered a family of Persian Baháʼís on the flight from Rome to Tel Aviv. She was met at the door by Jesse Revel, then treasurer of the International Baháʼí Council, and Isobel Sabri, a pioneer from Africa then on pilgrimage herself, but she had missed the events of the first day of Ridván. Isobel took notes during the pilgrimage and mentions Mayberry a few times. From her autobiography it appears she commented that there is not a great deal of receptivity to the religion in America, asked about the role of auxiliary board members, and asked about childhood education practices. The next morning she found her other fellow pilgrims to be Alice Dudley and Sallie Saynor. They visited the archives which at the time were housed in three rooms of the Shrine of the Báb. There she saw the passport photograph of Baháʼu'lláh, not knowing it existed previously. Then she went to the Shrine of ʻAbdu'l-Bahá next door. Shoghi Effendi commented that from her report the Alaskan Baha'i community had been progressing well.

That day's lunch was hosted by Ruhiyyih Khanum and then the ladies were invited over to Khanum and Effendi's current residence. There she attended a tea reception and then went back to the Western Pilgrim House and then the group had dinner with Shoghi Effendi. There were then successive visits to the prison and other sites of the pilgrimage, and last the Shrine of Baháʼu'lláh as a group. Then supper was served nearby. After dinner they visited the upper rooms of the Mansion of Bahjí. The next day she visited the Shrine of Baháʼu'lláh alone. They returned to the Haifa area for the ninth day of Ridván. A separate feast was held for the men and women and then all approached the Shrine of Báb and the tablet of visitation was said by Shoghi Effendi himself and the process repeated in the Shrine of ʻAbdu'l-Bahá. In two more days Florence was the lone western Baháʼí left. She recalled Shoghi Effendi referred to a few open spots on the scroll of the Knights of Baháʼu'lláh, the first pioneers to a country for the religion, and highlighted the staunchness of Marion Jack. One evening, she recalled, Shoghi Effendi suggested her family "Scatter and teach" and the consultation in the family later seemed to suggest mother Myrtle should pioneer.

She was soon leading some seminars back in the States in Montana and Wyoming in September with various levels of coverage on stations including KGVO. Giving a talk and taught at Geyserville school in October and before meeting in southern California in November. Following the request of the Guardian the Hands developed boards for proclaiming the religion as well as protecting it from division – Florence continued on the one promoting encouraging engaging the public and stirring its members to engaging on issues. In December she was at a Baha'i conference in Las Vegas.

===== Winter in Alaska =====
Mayberry called her 1958 trip to Alaska "the most dramatic" of her trips in her autobiography. The mid-winter trip began mild but a blizzard was in the way of the seaplane flying on toward Juneau and only got as far as Petersburg and would miss a scheduled TV appearance. Instead she struck up a conversation with the hotel manager who, noting she was a previous manager of a Chamber of Commerce arranged to have her show the slides taken from her pilgrimage at the local Chamber meeting that night. That meeting lead to a meeting at one of the homes of the members who also invited friends. One of them declared she would start a class on the religion – Charlotte Schwartz. The next day Mayberry flew on the Juneau, and then Sitka. From there she went to Fairbanks. Then on to Barrow, Alaska where the temperature she reports was an unusually warm 39 °F below zero. There she and the two local Baha'is had meetings including one of over 300 people over the objections of the local Christian minister The village had a long-standing Presbyterian presence. They were limited to meeting with school children's mothers. The next day was a presentation at the local theatre. From there she flew to Nome for a presentation and the Inuit returned the favor with a dance in her honor. Then she was on to the Aleutian Islands and then Kodiak Island. Then she returned to the lower 48 states, including briefly in Idaho.

===== Summer in the South and West =====
That Summer she started close to home and then she was in the outskirts of Dallas for the first time. Then she was on to Louisiana including interviews on KWKH and KSLA-TV. From there she made it to Green Acre Baháʼí School in October. Battleboro NH in October and Keene Teachers College in November Texas. Trips there were various into Spring 1959.

That Spring she was elected to the National Assembly while continuing service as an Auxiliary Board member with Horace Holley, then also a Hand of the Cause. A four-month trip accompanied by her then 13 yr old son followed and then Myrtle undertook the "scatter" pioneering goal of a town in Switzerland at the age of 70. She gave a talk in Texas and twin events in Phoenix and Albuquerque before leaving. While she was away a tape recording of a talk of hers was played locally in Santa Cruz. On return she gave local talks back in California.

===== To Mexico =====
A brief trip to Alaska in February 1960, and she was back in California. Hand of the Cause William Sears suggested an auxiliary board member living in Mexico or Central America would be helpful and the Mayberry family decided on Guadalajara, Mexico. A brief period at Geyserville Baháʼí School was followed by trips to Latin American countries. She was missed at a discussion of race issues the Baháʼís held in Wilmette, Ill. She made trips visiting national assemblies by December 1960. Then, after a return to Mexico City to consult with William Sears, she embarked on a trip through a couple of cities in Ecuador, Colombia, and Venezuela in 1961. That year they were each to gain their own national assembly, (she was present for the Colombian national convention.) On return from the trip she found she had been elected to the Mexican national assembly. She met the Pringle family at the San Blas Islands, specifically Ustupu, and was treated as an official representative of the religion by the island chief, or Cacique. A trip in the fall of 1961 followed to Guatemala.

Still she managed a trip to Texas in February 1962, and one stop in California in March.

===== Moving and trips =====
In early 1963 she also traveled to Nicaragua where she met Hooper Dunbar in Bluefields, followed by Belize, and Honduras. Then she attended the first international convention to elect the first Universal House of Justice as one of the national assembly members from Mexico, (delegates that vote for the Universal House of Justice are the members of the National Assemblies,) and then joined the first Baháʼí World Congress in London. Then she was in Texas in July and Alaska in August. She visited with the Kolstoe family – John Kolstoe is a writer of several books related to the religion.

The Mayberry family moved back to Santa Paula through the summer of 1963. Part of the motivation for moving back might have been her son's burgeoning family. In three years should be described as a grandmother of three.

Mayberry's first book, a children's book entitled "The Dachshunds of Mama Island", came out in late 1963. Advertised as a Doubleday book for young readers and was recommended in The Saturday Review. The book is set in Sitka, Alaska.

In late 1963 she recalled hearing of the Assassination of President Kennedy while in one of the villages in the Yucatán.

She gave a talk for World Religion Day in Chicago in mid January 1964, and just a couple days later in Atlanta Ga, and about two weeks later she was in Memphis TN, and Texas in at the end of February for Ayyám-i-Há, a celebratory time for Baháʼís. And Mayberry personally had something to celebrate - it was in February that her first of some 32 stories plus reprints would eventually published in Ellery Queen's Mystery Magazine, now the longest-running mystery fiction magazine, with "The Motion Picture in Mrs. Leister's Mind" (in the February 1964 issue). She would continue to publish in the magazine into the 1990s. In 1965/6 her first story to be anthologized was "The Motion Picture in Mrs. Leister's Mind" in the Ellery Queen's 20th anniversary annual: 20 stories from Ellery Queen's mystery magazine. She made a touch of news as one of the few female Ellery Queen mystery writers. In between she spoke at Green Acre Baháʼí School in early April 1964, and then in Battleboro, NH. There's a break in her travels until Utah in November.

She was back for the World Religion Day observance in January 1965 and then in February she was in Seattle. Then she was in Appleton Wisconsin in April, and nearby Oshkosh. In May she was first at the US national convention. In June she was in Bakersfield CA, followed by an ABC radio program panel she was on with Hand of the Cause William Sears and others. Then she was at the Davidson Baháʼí school (later it was renamed the Louhelen Baháʼí School) in Michigan through the rest of June. Before October she was at a second session of the summer school of southern California followed by a campaign in the area, and in Seattle in September. She was in Tustin California in October. A poem of Mayberry's, World Anthem, was included in a youth compilation published by the US Baháʼí Publishing Trust. In December she was back at the Davidson Baháʼí School.

In early January 1966 she started off in Idaho. Then she was at a national assembly coordinated week long series of events for World Religion Day and Mayberry closed the series Sunday evening. Before March she was in Seattle. But in March her mother Myrtle's health declined and she went into the hospital and died in a few days, on March 25, 1966. In April Mayberry gave a talk in Fresno, and May in Utah, and Montana. In later May she was in New Jersey at a meeting called by Hands of the Cause.

1966 Sep gave a talk at the Los Angeles Baháʼí Center and was profiled in the Fresno Bee. In the profile she was noted as in the "Index of distinguished short stories, Best American short stories" and is quoted that to write, "one must be almost ruthless in cutting oneself off from others and giving time oneself time and privacy." But she wasn't there for her writing achievements – she was in Fresno for "Baha'i Week" coordinated effort to present the religion to the public.

For March 1967 she was filmed on an interfaith panel in southern California. By Ridván she was at the US national convention. At the anniversary observance of the House of Worship in September 1967 Mayberry introduced the Hands of the Cause and in December at another meeting in San Francisco.

=== Counsellor ===
1968 started out similarly to past year. In February she was in Montana, a recording of her was used in Illinois in March, and Spokane Washington in April. In April she was in Seattle. While she was working at a seasons school, perhaps Geyersville, she received a phone call about her appointment as a Continental Counselor for North America – the telegram went to her home address and her husband called her about it. Edna True, daughter of Hand of the Cause Corinne Knight True, and Lloyd Gardner were named with her.

She was listed as the contact address for anyone wanting direct contact with the Counselors for North America. From December 1968 to March 1969 she assisted at a series of conferences – Montreal, Oshawa, Canada, then Atlanta, Philadelphia, Los Angeles, St Louis, (Phoenix), Saskatoon, Vancouver. She attended the US national convention. In June she was at a conference in Halifax and in July she still gave a talk at the Geyersville Baha'i school, and in August met with Native American Baha'is and others in Washington state. She was also later remembered in Alaska in 1969.

In 1970 a talk of hers was done close to home in Santa Paula, and then at the Geyersville school in September. For Ridvan 1970 she was in Alaska.

During the Oceanic and Continental Conferences series of 1970–71 she was assigned the one in Sapporo Japan (held early September) and she found that a round the world trip was only a little more expensive. She learned how to say a two line greeting in Japanese. While in Japan she visited Kyoto. Then she went on to Hong Kong, Singapore,(200) Malaysia,(in Sept 1971,) India(200–1), Iran, (where she managed a visit to the House of the Bab) (202) and made her third visit to she accomplished a 3-day pilgrimage. Then to the UK (where she visited the grave, a shrine to Baha'is, of the Guardian)

She returned and gave a talk in Los Angeles by January 1971. This was followed by a talk in Texas in November, and then again back in her home area. Shortly after the 1971 San Fernando earthquake William Sears was the central attraction of a conference in Los Angeles Florence appeared at. She was in the Alaska national convention in 1971. July–August she was at a conference in Santa Ana.

In March 1972 the Counselors of North American held twin conferences in the US - Reno Nevada and Fort Wayne, Indiana. Florence hosted the Reno event assisted by Auxiliary Board members Margaret Gallagher, Velma Sherrill, Anthony Lease and Paul Pettit Gallagher died in 2001. Sherrill was herself appointed a counselor in 1973. Lease served until 1986 and died in 2006. Paul Pettit died in 2010. April she attended the US national convention and made it to the Alaskan one. In October she gave a talk in Montana and then Myrtle Beach SC and then the dedication of the Louis Gregory Institute.

In January 1973 she was a speaker at World Religion Day in San Francisco, and in March was giving talks in her home area. In May she attended the US national convention and then went on to the world convention to elect the Universal House of Justice and noted there were 1017 delegates.(206) Returning from that she visited in Switzerland, then Canada. On return home she received a call that she had been appointed a Counsellor for the International Teaching Center (announced June 5.) She visited there a few days later and accomplished her move to live in Haifa just as the Yom Kippur War started, (October 6, 1973.) After a brief stop in Alaska.

In August 1974 she attended a meetings Kenya, and in what was then called Rhodesia. October 1976 she was in Germany at a Baha'i conference. A biographical article was written about her as a writer was published in November. January 1977 she was in Australia. In October she was at a European conference. December she was in Singapore. Thailand in January 1977.

From 1971 to 74 she published more original stories than any other time (averaging 3 a year) and was anthologized once (see bibliography below).

February 1977 a conference looking at promulgating the religion in Mexico also took place in Mérida with more than 2000 Baháʼís attending. One third of the participants were indigenous believers from across Central America 150 of whom were Mayans. Non-Baháʼí family members of the Indians were allowed to fully attend the meeting. Three Hands of the Cause were present - Paul Haney, Rahmatu'lláh Muhájir, and Enoch Olinga, as well as Counsellor Florence Mayberry. David made a trip to Utah. Baháʼí News interviewed her about the institution in 1979.

According to her biography, in 1982, for "unsteady health", at age 77, both she and David asked to leave the active service as Counselor and she officially retired in 1983. And David collapsed twice in the year or two after.

== Retired ==
Initially they lived in Idaho but soon moved to the Conway MO area.(214) She gave a talk in Spokane that November.

In 1984 she undertook her 18th trip to Alaska came in the spring.(146) Various of the trips had reached from the Arctic Ocean to the Bering Sea through central Alaska and the Aleutian and Kodiak Islands. She also met Indian and Inuit peoples and various attitudes they had either finding resonances in the roots of their cultures with the religion or in struggling with the confusion of "white man's ways". Newspaper coverage is found for her visit to Sitka in April. In December she was at a Baha'i conference in Hawaii.

Noted one of the "excellent writers somewhat less well-known" Ellery Queen writers, 1984. From 1983 to 1987 mostly reprints of her 1970s stories appeared individually or were collected in anthologies (in 1984 and 1986 she was anthologized three times each, see bibliography below.) 1986 in an anthology in an audiobook sold in Australia. 1989

In 1992–93 she wrote new pieces again which were themselves anthologized from then on, (see bibliography below.) 1991 anthology Scarlet Letters: Tales of Adultery from Ellery Queen's Mystery Magazine. 1994 twice for the same story. 1995 and 1996 for the same story.

- Once upon a Crime II: Stories from Ellery Queen's Mystery Magazine (No. 2) 4.5 avg rating • 2 ratings by GoodReads9780312143862: Once upon a Crime II: Stories from Ellery Queen's Mystery Magazine (No. 2)Publisher: St Martins Pr, ISBN 978-0-312-14386-2

Husband David preceded her in death, dying February 1994.

In 1995 she published her autobiography, The Great Adventure after working on it for 5 years and had a local book signing, and had a brief profile in the LA Times.

== Death ==
Florence died on April 8, 1998. The Universal House of Justice telegrammed national assemblies of her death and then asked the American communities, North and South, to hold memorials in her memory in general, and specifically at the Baha'i Houses of Worship in Wilmette Illinois and Panama City, (the new one in Santiago Chile did not yet exist.) She is buried in the Marshfield Cemetery, Marshfield, Missouri.

=== Legacy ===
Though she had been anthologized several times in the 1990s before her death she continued to be collected and reprinted in various works as late as 2012. In 2004 her work "When Nothing Matters" was collected in Fifty Best Mysteries. In 2005 her stories "Smiling Joe and the Twins" and "Miz Sammy's Honor" was collected and printed in Murder in Retrospect: A Selective Guide to Historical Mystery Fiction. In 2012 her story "The Secret" was collected and printed in Outcasts and Angels: The New Anthology of Deaf Characters in Literature.

The Baháʼís have also established a seasonal Baháʼí school under the sponsorship of the US National Spiritual Assembly named after her. Kevin Locke performed there in 2011.

== Bibliography ==
She wrote new stories for the Ellery Queen Mystery Magazine annually from 1968 to 1979, and was in print annually from 1968 to 1987. There were three peaks of activity – in 1971-4 she published more original stories than any other time (averaging 3 a year) and was anthologized once, in 1983–1987 mostly reprints of these same stories appeared individually or were collected in anthologies (in 1984 and 1986 she was anthologized three times each.) In 1992-3 she wrote new pieces again which were themselves anthologized from then on appearing most recently in 2012. All together some 16 of her 34 short stories have been anthologized as of 2015, with three of them anthologized seven times – The Grass Widow, The Secret and Smiling Joe and the Twins – and 8 published more than once.

1. The Red Ball by F. V. Mayberry, Frontier and Midland magazine, Jan-Feb 1939
2. (poem) Adam's Black Boy by Florence V. Mayberry, Common Ground, Autumn 1945, pp. 22–23
3. Kiko by Florence V. Mayberry, The Pacific Spectator, 1952, pp. 364–78 (listed among best short stories of 1953)
4. (children's novel) Florence V. Mayberry (1964). The dachshunds of Mama Island. Doubleday.
5. Motion Picture in Mrs. Leister's Mind by Florence V. Mayberry, Ellery Queen's Mystery Magazine, February 1964, pp. 58–66 (anthologized 1965)
6. Out of the Dream Stumbling by Florence V. Mayberry, Ellery Queen's Mystery Magazine, May 1964, pp. 46–56
7. A Lily in Chrissy's Hand by Florence V. Mayberry, Ellery Queen's Mystery Magazine, July 1965, pp. 57–65
8. Bitter Vetch by Florence V. Mayberry, Ellery Queen's Mystery Magazine, March 1968, pp. 79–88
9. Lost Soaring Dream by Florence V. Mayberry, Ellery Queen's Mystery Magazine, March 1969, pp. 128–133
10. Not Lost Any More by Florence V. Mayberry, Ellery Queen's Mystery Magazine, September 1969, pp. 99–105
11. Doll Baby by Florence V. Mayberry, Ellery Queen's Mystery Magazine, December 1970, pp. 30–46
12. The Beauty in That House by Florence V. Mayberry, Ellery Queen's Mystery Magazine, May 1971, pp. 53–65 (anthologized 1989)
13. The Lady of the Afghans by Florence V. Mayberry, Ellery Queen's Mystery Magazine, August 1971, pp. 131–145
14. To Find a Millionaire by Florence V. Mayberry, Ellery Queen's Mystery Magazine, December 1971, pp. 18–33
15. Screen Test by Florence V. Mayberry, Ellery Queen's Mystery Magazine, February 1972, pp. 6–19
16. The Thing on the Beach by Florence V. Mayberry, Ellery Queen's Mystery Magazine, July 1972, pp. 32–49
17. So Lonely, So Lost, So Frightened by Florence V. Mayberry, Ellery Queen's Mystery Magazine, August 1972, pp. 133–146 (anthologized 1974)
18. Hong Kong or Wherever by Florence V. Mayberry, Ellery Queen's Mystery Magazine, December 1972, pp. 42–56
19. Monkey-Face by Florence V. Mayberry, Ellery Queen's Mystery Magazine, June 1973, pp. 119–133
20. Woman Trouble by Florence V. Mayberry, Ellery Queen's Mystery Magazine, October 1973, pp. 127–141 (anthologized 1986)
21. In the Secret Hollow by Florence V. Mayberry, Ellery Queen's Mystery Magazine, December 1973, pp. 107–118
22. A Goodbye Sound by Florence V. Mayberry, Ellery Queen's Mystery Magazine, May 1974, pp. 121–132 (anthologized 1984, and 1993)
23. Good Night, Sweet by Florence V. Mayberry, Ellery Queen's Mystery Magazine, July 1975, pp. 117–127 (anthologized 1980)
24. Doll Baby by Florence V. Mayberry, Ellery Queen's Mystery Magazine, March 1976, pp. 190–207 (repeated from Dec 1970)
25. Till the Day I Die by Florence V. Mayberry, Ellery Queen's Mystery Magazine, May 1976, pp. 53–68
26. Hong Kong or Wherever by Florence V. Mayberry, Ellery Queen's Mystery Magazine, March 1977, pp. 259–273 (repeated from Dec 1972)
27. The Grass Widow by Florence V. Mayberry, Ellery Queen's Mystery Magazine, August 1977, pp. 39–54 (anthologized 1979 and 1992)
28. Woman Trouble by Florence V. Mayberry, Ellery Queen's Mystery Magazine, March 1978, pp. 252–266 (repeated from Oct 1973, anthologized 1986)
29. No Tomorrows by Florence V. Mayberry, Ellery Queen's Mystery Magazine, June 1978, pp. 117–124
30. A Goodbye Sound by Florence V. Mayberry, Ellery Queen's Mystery Magazine, September 1978, pp. 169–180 (repeated from May 1974, anthologized 1984)
31. When Nothing Matters by Florence V. Mayberry, Ellery Queen's Mystery Magazine, December 1979, pp. 69–78 (anthologized 2004)
32. The Girl Downstairs by Florence V. Mayberry, Ellery Queen's Mystery Magazine, January 28, 1981, pp. 59–69
33. Lady in the Black Cape by Florence V. Mayberry, Ellery Queen's Mystery Magazine, May 1982, pp. 59–73
34. Where Are the Birds? by Florence V. Mayberry, Ellery Queen's Mystery Magazine, August 1982, pp. 112–125
35. The Hallucination by Florence V. Mayberry, Ellery Queen's Mystery Magazine, January 1983, pp. 21–29
36. A Goodbye Sound by Florence V. Mayberry, Ellery Queen's Mystery Magazine, Summer 1983, pp. 26–37 (repeated from May 1974, anthologized 1984)
37. Woman Trouble by Florence V. Mayberry, Ellery Queen's Mystery Magazine, Fall 1983, pp. 62–75 (repeated from Oct 1973, anthologized 1986)
38. No Tomorrows by Florence V. Mayberry, Ellery Queen's Mystery Magazine, Fall 1984, pp. 210–216 (repeated from June 1978)
39. Widow? by Florence V. Mayberry, Ellery Queen's Mystery Magazine, June 1985, pp. 90–105
40. The Beauty in That House by Florence V. Mayberry, Ellery Queen's Mystery Magazine, Summer 1987, pp. 92–103 (repeated from May 1971, anthologized 1989)
41. Miz Sammy's Honor by Florence V. Mayberry, Ellery Queen's Mystery Magazine, June 1992, pp. 42–58 (anthologized 2005)
42. The Stranger by Florence V. Mayberry, Ellery Queen's Mystery Magazine, November 1992, pp. 110–123
43. The Secret by Florence V. Mayberry, Ellery Queen's Mystery Magazine, December 1992, pp. 108–123 (anthologized 1995, 1996, and 2012)
44. Smiling Joe and the Twins by Florence V. Mayberry, Ellery Queen's Mystery Magazine, September 1993, pp. 30–55 (anthologized 1994 and 2005)
45. (auto-biography) Florence Mayberry (January 1, 1994). The Great Adventure. Nine Pines Publishing. ISBN 978-1-895456-08-0.
