= Baháʼí Faith in Papua New Guinea =

The Baháʼí Faith in Papua New Guinea begins after 1916 with a mention by ʻAbdu'l-Bahá, then head of the religion, that Baháʼís should take the religion there. The first Baháʼís moved there (what Baháʼís mean by "pioneering") in Papua New Guinea arrived there in 1954. With local converts the first Baháʼí Local Spiritual Assembly was elected in 1958. The first National Spiritual Assembly was then elected in 1969. According to the census of 2000 showed that the number of Baháʼís does not exceed 21,000. But the Association of Religion Data Archives (relying on World Christian Encyclopedia) estimated three times more Baháʼís at 200,000 or 6% of the nation were Baháʼís in 2015. Either way, it is the largest minority religion in Papua New Guinea.

== Early days ==
=== ʻAbdu'l-Bahá's Tablets of the Divine Plan ===
The first mention by the religion of the region happened during its rule by Australia, while it was known as the Territory of Papua. ʻAbdu'l-Bahá, head of the religion from 1892 to 1921, mentioned it among the places Baháʼís should take the religion to when he wrote a series of letters, or tablets, to the followers of the religion in the United States in 1916–1917; these letters were compiled together in the book titled Tablets of the Divine Plan. The seventh of the tablets mentioned taking the Baha'i Faith to Papua New Guinea and was written on April 11, 1916, but was delayed in being presented in the United States until 1919—after the end of World War I and the Spanish flu. These tablets were translated and presented by Mirza Ahmad Sohrab on April 4, 1919, and published in Star of the West magazine on December 12, 1919.

(Tablet 7) "A party speaking their languages, severed, holy, sanctified and filled with the love of God, must turn their faces to and travel through the three great island groups of the Pacific Ocean—Polynesia, Micronesia and Melanesia, and the islands attached to these groups, such as New Guinea, Borneo, Java, Sumatra, Philippine Islands, Solomon Islands, Fiji Islands, New Hebrides, Loyalty Islands, New Caledonia, Bismarck Archipelago, Ceram, Celebes, Friendly Islands, Samoa Islands, Society Islands, Caroline Islands, Low Archipelago, Marquesas, Hawaiian Islands, Gilbert Islands, Moluccas, Marshall Islands, Timor and the other islands. With hearts overflowing with the love of God, with tongues commemorating the mention of God, with eyes turned to the Kingdom of God, they must deliver the glad tidings of the manifestation of the Lord of Hosts to all the people. Know ye of a certainty that whatever gathering ye enter, the waves of the Holy Spirit are surging over it, and the heavenly grace of the Blessed Beauty encompasseth that gathering."

=== Beginnings ===
A Baháʼí is known to have been on the island by 1953. It is also known that Mildred Mottahedeh visited while she traveled through the area of the southern Pacific. The first to take up residence by long term pioneering was Violet Hoehnke in 1954. For this service she was named a Knight of Baha'u'llah by then head of the religion, Shoghi Effendi.

The religion soon had great appeal to Nalik people who felt it more in tune with their traditional understandings compared to the teachings of Christian evangelical missionaries. Apelis Mazakmat, the first Malik to join the religion, met Hoehnke and was attracted by the Baháʼí teaching of racial equality, and converted early in 1956 after learning more about it from Rodney Hancock. Australian norms and laws of the time enforced a separation between the races. Hancock was detained for mixing with black skinned indigenous peoples on several occasions and was subsequently deported because he stayed overnight in local villages without the permission of the colonial authorities.

Most significantly, according to scholarly review, was that whereas Christian missionaries openly opposed traditional funerary art and performances, the Baháʼís encouraged their production as a form of worship. Thus while Nalik Baháʼís are regarded by other Naliks as arbiters of traditional knowledge and practices, the Christian missions and their followers are seen as antagonistic to kastom, a Pidgin English word used to refer to traditional culture because of their negative stance on ritual image production.

These differences were perceived by Mazakmat who returned home and promulgated the religion despite resistance from the Catholic and Methodist missions. He met up with an old friend, Michael Homerang, who was a highly respected malanggan carver and clan leader (maimai) in the village of Madina, on the north shore of New Ireland Province in the far north east. Momerang later said "I saw a white man and woman come to my village and sit down to eat and talk with us. They even slept in our houses. ... Only the Almight can make this happen..." Then they met with clan leaders and elders of the community and early in 1958 there were a further 10 conversions who elected the first Baháʼí Local Spiritual Assembly of Papua New Guinea, followed by 30–40 more converts over the next four years in two villages. 1958 is considered the founding year of the Baháʼí community in Papua New Guinea. Representatives from Papua and New Guinea each (the country was then administered separately) attended the 1958 conference in Australia on the promulgation of the religion.

According to local Naliks a delegation of missionaries threatened former Methodists with damnation, monetary fines, and expulsion from the Church and when a fire was started in Madina's Baháʼí Center it was blamed on arsonists loyal to the Methodist mission. These and other documented events frightened away many newly converted Baháʼís, who returned to the Methodist mission. For other Bahaʼis, these actions simply consolidated their belief that they were a persecuted religious group echoing the suffering of the early history of the religion and persecution suffered in Iran.

== Forming a national community ==
The decoration of Baháʼí centers and practices of sharing of stories of the history of the religion became infused with mixtures of Baháʼí and Nalik symbology while Baháʼís moving to the country learned to appreciate indigenous culture's orientation to "...develop a view of life that was not simply confined to their own surroundings and necessities, but rather was a cosmic perspective of life as a whole." In all some hundred and fifty Baháʼís assisted the development of a community numbered in the thousands and Hoehnke carried on a correspondence with over a hundred letters.

The first summer school on the religion was held in the spring of 1965 with class attendance averaging 80 people followed by a second in December 1965. The classed included the first Baháʼís from another village of New Ireland and Morobe Province of New Guinea while Hoebneke, newly appointed as an Auxiliary Board member, emphasized the history of the religion as well as a view on comparative religion—all carried out in Pidgin English—along with a mock assembly meeting, reviews of Baháʼí laws, prayers, and a chance to discuss the concerns of the people of the region.

In 1965 Tom Kabu became the first Papuan Baháʼí. Approximately twenty Papuans became Baháʼís in Port Moresby immediately after Kabu who were from the Baimuru area. Kabu traveled among many villages presenting the religion. Yale University professor Charles Forman analyzed religious trends across the Pacific Islands and attributes what he termed the surprising growth of the Baháʼí Faith across Micronesia was partly due to a certain amount of response from some youths of wider experience and education as well as from some village folk among whom Baháʼís settled. Probably the greatest single increase, in his view, came in 1966 with this effort as Kabu was a leader of an important modernising movement in the Purari River area of Papua. Kabu died in 1969 from tuberculosis after being sick about a year.

The first members of the National Spiritual Assembly of the Baháʼís of Papua New Guinea were elected in 1969. Its membership was: John Francis, Noel Bluett, David Podger, Sue Podger, Margaret Bluett, Michael Homerang, Rodney Hancock, Frank Wyss and Gas Dau. There were 31 delegates at the convention, only three could not attend, and Hand of the Cause Collis Featherstone represented the Universal House of Justice, then head of the religion ("Hand of the Cause" being one of a select group of Baháʼís, appointed for life, whose main function was to propagate and protect the religion under the head of the religion.) Goals and materials were voted on at the convention to make translations in indigenous languages. Previous translations of the histories of the lives of the Báb and Baháʼu'lláh were reviewed in Pidgin English.

=== Multiplying activities ===
==== Internal developments ====
While central administration continued, many waves of journeys spread throughout much of the country in various extended trips often woven with various meeting events Baháʼís call "institutes" or Baháʼí schools for formal review of Baháʼí teachings and their application in individual and collective undertakings.

The second national convention was held in Lae in 1970, was attended by thirty six of the thirty eight delegates, and they discussed suggestions of initiatives for the Talasea, Pawaia, and Chimbu peoples of the mainland. Later in 1970 Hand of the Cause Enoch Olinga, from central Africa, visited five villages and nearby Solomon Islands in two weeks.

Sue Podger undertook an extended trip along the Gulf Province in early 1971 across seven villages. During the trip she gave several talks and helped elect delegates for the national convention. That year's election of the national assembly saw Teman Kosap, John Mills, Noel Bluett, Lopena Vera, Margaret Bluett, Dan Humes, John Francis, Sue Podger, and David Podger elected, with Hand of the Cause Collis Featherstone again attending. It was noted that there was difficulty re-electing assemblies in local areas when an individual mentioned the issue at a conference in Fiji.

In 1973 the Universal House of Justice formally approved the practice of “translations” in simple English for use in Papua New Guinea as long as the original English translation appeared on the same page when in print to preserve the integrity of the authorized translation but also to “provide a means whereby the people of Papua and New Guinea could improve their knowledge and understanding of the English language.” However a translation of the Short Obligatory Prayer into a vernacular language of Papua New Guinea had to be revised when it was found that the translator had inserted an extra paragraph, because the original prayer was “too short”.

Hand of the Cause Featherstone attended the 1974 convention while the first known conversions to the religion took place in the Mount Brown region of Central Province.

1975 saw the first Papuan woman, Elti Kunak, elected to the national assembly—she also won a national award for her work on women's rights. That year also saw the near total conversion of eight remote villages.

In 1976 four teams of Baháʼís, mostly from New Zealand, visited many remote villages and reached areas Baháʼís had not seen.

In 1977 youth from Papua New Guinea attended the eighth international youth conference in Australia. In 1978 Papua New Guineans hosted their first national conference on the promulgation of the religion and a music group toured and held numerous meetings both public and private for about 4 weeks. A summer school was held that year with attendance from neighboring countries as well as various nearby areas.

A group of African American Baháʼís did a week-long tour in the country in 1979. By 1980 Hoehnke is noted as a Continental Counselor.

A national youth conference of some 40 people took place in Port Moresby in 1981 while three provinces hosted Baháʼí institutes (a predecessor of Ruhi Institutes).

The religion reached Goodenough Island in 1982.

It was also noted that the Baháʼís of Papua New Guinea gained financial self-sufficiency in 1986.

Youth from Rabaul sponsored an assembly training event for their elders in 1988 on Watom Island.

==== Public developments ====
In 1972 a Baháʼí school was first established in Madina and that year Hand of the Cause John Robarts also visited Port Moresby and Goroka. Rodney Hancock was also named an Auxiliary Board member by then. Robarts also helped dedicate a school in Sogeri. Another permanent school building was raised in Arufa in late 1972.

The Mount Brown region was noted in early 1975 because the new community was involved in organizing their own school and other institutions while in Lae Baháʼí college students organized public events on both universities of Lae centered around talks by Dr. Peter Khan. That year the Baháʼís also offered a float in the national observance of Independence day.

Materials on the religion were presented to leading figures in the national government in 1979. and in 1980 the Baháʼís of Lae rose in support of the International Year of the Child with a program at the local children's hospital and established a goal of setting up training schools for literacy.

A wave of opposition, including some deaths of Baháʼís, occurred in 1980 among the indigenous Afore of Oro Province and was followed by a tour of villages by Baháʼís. That year a gift of materials on the religion was donated to a library in Rabaul and a five-week tour of Hand of the Cause Featherstone took place. A public Baháʼí display was put up by a Baháʼí businessman in Rabaul.

A film viewing of developments of the religion in Samoa happened in 1982 while a local conference happened in the Mt. Brown region which saw the dedication of a new center and a tour of nearby villages was undertaken.

In 1983 several regional institutes were held inside the country—in Kwikila and Tabunomu and one in Keravat which included the topic of the life and martyrdom of Badí. That year world traveling Baháʼí André Brugiroux also visited with television and newspaper coverage in his wake. Following all these developments there was coverage of the observance of the Execution of the Báb in newspapers as part of a profile of the religion.

In 1984 Papua New Guineans traveled through Australia promulgating the religion among the Aboriginal Australians and about 50 people attended a UN Day observance in Port Modesby. In 1985 news of developments in the Milne Bay Province included an increasing pace in the rate of conversions, that the Baháʼís entered a float into the national independence parade and Baháʼís were now running several permanent schools—in Lae, New Ireland, New Britain and Milne Bay Provinces. They ranged from serving students who finished Grade Six by helping them with a government correspondence course to rural preschools and schools with classes on hygiene, nutrition, health and agriculture, composting.

In 1986 The Promise of World Peace, written by the Universal House of Justice, was given to the Governor-General of Papua New Guinea, Kingsford Dibela, at a UN Day observance. It was also given to the vice-chancellors of University of Papua New Guinea and of the Papua New Guinea University of Technology. The text was also published in the newspaper. In 1987 the statement was translated into Motu. The statement was given to then Prime Minister Rabbie Namaliu along with radio and newspaper coverage in 1989. Papua New Guinean Baháʼís participated with Australian Baháʼís who held a peace expo.

A literacy class was noted in 1987 along with a rural school recognized by national government as well as a rural clinic. By 1988 several projects are noted—a women's committee coordinated medical training for mothers and teachers in Rabaul, a youth conference was held in Lae, and a fund raiser for the Arc developments at the Baháʼí World Center in Port Moresby. Another local school in Kareeba was noted in 1989. Additional local, regional, national and international activities were held in 1989—some in Western Province, another series of events were along the Ramu River, another health training institute was recorded and played on a radio station in Rabual, and a music festival was promoted by several women's groups.

== Modern community ==
=== National progression/Demographics ===
As early as 1972 Baháʼí Holy Days were recognized by a government institution.

Growth
year	Delegates to the national convention	year	number of local assemblies
		1958	1
1969	31		
1970	38		
		1979	131
1982	42		
		1989	180
1991	76	1991	259
		1993	300

By 1987 the National Spiritual Assembly had been incorporated, at least one Local Spiritual Assembly had been incorporated, Baháʼí marriage ceremonies had been acknowledged as legally binding and tax exemption had been recognized for institutions of the religion. The 1991 community has been outlined as being rapidly growing and geographically dispersed—Baháʼí communities in 87 of the country's 88 districts, at least 3 local assemblies in each of its 19 provinces: in that year 61 of 76 delegates attended the national convention, and an additional 12 forwarded absentee votes. There is also considerable exposure in the national press, and is well known to the country's political leaders.

Starting around 1990, Baháʼís sources can be juxtaposed with external reviews especially when national census data begins. The partial national census figures from 1990 showed some 6700 Baháʼís. Meanwhile, in 1993 Baháʼí sources reported over 20,000 Baháʼís (a number still being published as late as 2006) in virtually every district of every province in the country with over 300 local assemblies. However, by 2000 near 0.3% of the national populations are observed as Baháʼí based on 2000 census (roughly 20000) though the Association of Religion Data Archives (relying on World Christian Encyclopedia) favored about triple this estimate.

Regional international conferences were called for by the Universal House of Justice 20 October 2008 to celebrate recent achievements in grassroots community-building and to plan next steps in organizing efforts in local areas. One was held in Lae in January 2009 with 1500 people attending held on the campus of the Papua New Guinea University of Technology. Major performances were organized by groups from East New Britain, Milne Bay, and the Siane region of the highlands of Oro Provinces.

In 2012 the Universal House of Justice announced plans to build a new Baháʼí House of Worship in Papua New Guinea. A number of books of Baháʼí literature have been printed in translations.

The main characters in a documentary on the religion released in 2012, The Gardener, includes an articulate gardener Eona, a native of Papua New Guinea, who brings a feeling of deep inner devotion as he talks about its tenets while he tends the flower beds.

==== Continued local developments ====
In addition to national statistics there are individual cases noting some aspect of the position of the religion among Guineans.

Bob Napili attended the 1988 election of the Universal House in the traditional garb of his aboriginal heritage.

43 adult Baha'is and 17 children who attended the Baháʼí Unit Convention in Rabaul, the first time in which the Baha'is of East New Britain had gathered to elect a delegate to the Baháʼí national convention. Indeed, most had heard about the meeting on a local radio broadcast in 1989.

There was a local training institute for nine days in 1990 in Rabual.

In 1995 and 1996 the Evangelical Church of Papua ministering to the Gogodala people in the Middle Fly District observed that Baháʼís and other small churches were "peripheral and largely ineffectual" but a couple years later "had become more obvious." An ex-pastor suggested to Christian researchers that he had joined the Baháʼí Faith because they respected music and dance as spiritual. "In Baháʼí Faith dancing is not bad. Dancing was put on earth by God; it is for rejoicing and it is a time of happiness when it comes to dancing time." Circa 2009 children's classes have multiplied and people began studying the curriculum of the Ruhi Institute.

A local conference on the progress of the religion was held in the Milne Bay area in 1995.

By 2000 the Ruhi institute process had organized a network for delivering courses, mostly reviewing Baháʼí teachings, to nearly two-thirds of the members of the religion according to Baháʼís. Then the institute began to focus on delivering a sequence of courses that would train a percentage of Baháʼís in the tasks promulgating the religion.

Papua New Guinean Baháʼís representing 15 Provinces of the country traveled to attend the opening of the Terraces of the Shrine of the Bab in 2001—and news of it was carried locally.

More than 300 Baháʼís and some Christian guests gathered in 2003 for the opening of the center in a remote village all of whose residents are members of the religion.

=== Focus to the society ===
Since its inception the religion has had involvement in socio-economic development beginning by giving greater freedom to women, promulgating the promotion of female education as a priority concern, and that involvement was given practical expression by creating schools, agricultural coops, and clinics. The religion entered a new phase of activity when a message of the Universal House of Justice dated 20 October 1983 was released. Baháʼís were urged to seek out ways, compatible with the Baháʼí teachings, in which they could become involved in the social and economic development of the communities in which they lived. Worldwide in 1979 there were 129 officially recognized Baháʼí socio-economic development projects. By 1987, the number of officially recognized development projects had increased to 1482. In Papua New Guinea this has taken a variety of forms. The national community supports a number of projects both locally and nationally organized.

==== Women's status ====
Papua New Guineans attended the 1983 Pacific international conference in Australia as part of a series dedicated to the memory of Bahíyyih Khánum, the leading woman of the religion, and an all-girl singing group formed and toured. Baháʼís gained representation on the national Women's Council and a national conference of Baháʼí women was held. This interest was broadened for the broader society when in the next year a national women's conference sponsored by the Baháʼís. Margaret Elias, daughter of the first Papuan woman on the national assembly, and the country's first woman lawyer (in the 1970s), was one of some 400 Baháʼí women and men who traveled from more than 50 countries around the world to participate in the NGO Forum on Women related to the 1995 Fourth World Conference on Women. Elias was also awarded in 1995 and 2002 for her many years in the public service, particularly as in the national government and went on to support various initiatives for education.

==== Education service ====
Continuing the service of setting up schools and other services several more were documented in recent years. A pre-school was being run in 1995. A school was acknowledged by a provincial government.

Medical and educational facilities were noted in concert with governmental initiatives as early as 1991. A specific medical station had been started in 2006, completed by a Baháʼí community in 2007, in Karkar Island.

Baháʼís used a youth dance workshop (see Oscar DeGruy) to combat growth of gangs in Bougainville Island in 1997.

Sirus Naraqi, who had placed first in his Iranian college entrance exams, and lived and worked in Papua New Guinea from 1977–1979 and 1983–1998 partially doing clinical work as well as teachings at the University of Papua New Guinea where he was awarded in 1999 and served as a member of the Continental Board of Counsellors in Australasia since 1985.

A school started in 1995 in a remote village started serving neighboring villages by 2007.

==== Sustainable entrepreneurial development ====
Baháʼís re-developed a gold mine along sustainable practices as well as Papua New Guinean staff which earned some notoriety in 2003.

The Commission on Sustainable Development Youth Caucus had Baháʼí based representatives in Papua New Guinea in 2009.

== See also ==
- History of Papua New Guinea
- Religion in Papua New Guinea
