= Bosch Baháʼí School =

Bahá'í owned educational and conference facility near Santa Cruz, California

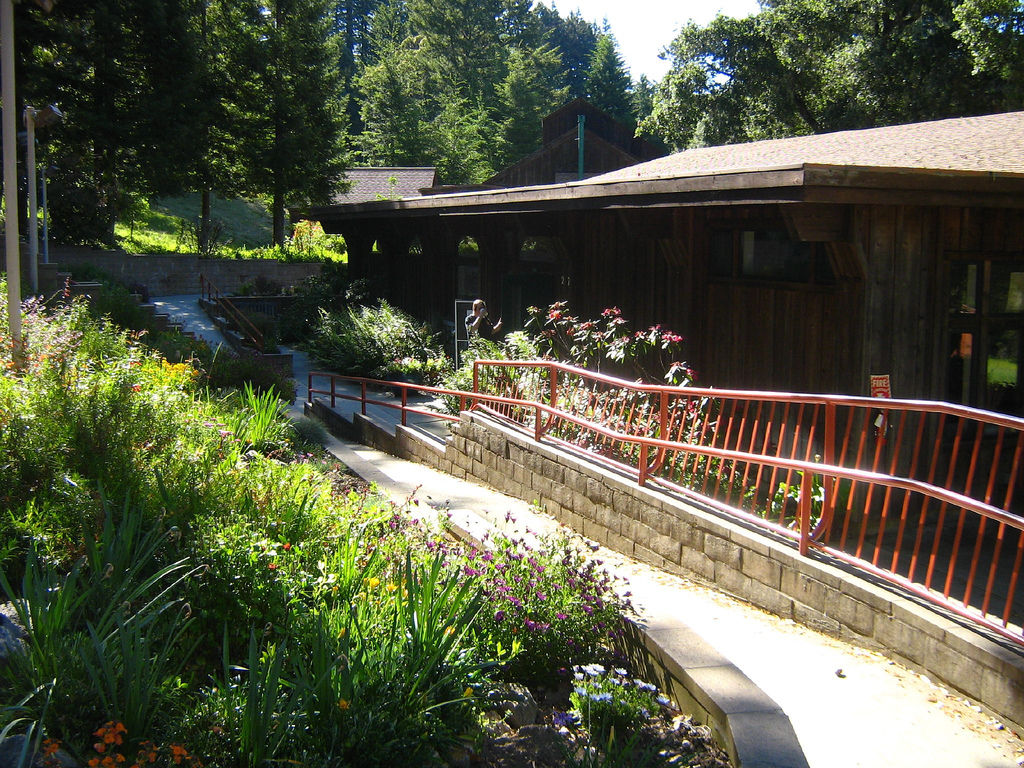
Martha Root Hall at Bosch Baha'i School Santa Cruz, California

Bosch Baháʼí School is one of several permanent schools run by the National Spiritual Assembly of the Baháʼís of the United States (others include Louhelen and Green Acre). It is located near Santa Cruz, California and has year-round programs for both adults and children.

The Bosch School is the direct successor to the older Geyserville School founded in 1925 and run until 1973. The Geyserville property was donated by Louise and John Bosch, early American Baháʼís, and the school was the first Baháʼí School in the west.

== History ==
=== Geyserville School ===
The school ran for almost 50 years in Geyserville, California, as one of the three official Bahá’í Schools of the religion in America.

The school was founded by the Bosches, who immigrated to America from Switzerland and were early converts in America to the Bahá’í Faith. John David Bosch (1855-1946) immigrated in 1879, became naturalized in 1887, and bought a 45 acres (180,000 m^{2}) section of a winery on October 26, 1901 as his residence in Geyserville, California not far from the Dry Creek Rancheria Band of Pomo Indians and north of Healdsburg. Bosch began producing non-alcoholic grape juice, joined the religion in 1905, and was able to meet ʻAbdu'l-Bahá several times.

Louise Sophie Stapfer (1870-1952) became a Baháʼí and met ʻAbdu'l-Bahá on a pilgrimage to ʻAkká in 1909. She married John on January 19, 1914. The germ of the idea of the school was voiced in 1919 in a letter to ʻAbdu'l-Bahá, and became a specific plan in 1925 during a birthday party held on the Feast of Asma ("Names") for John's 70th birthday. About 100 Bahá'ís gathered in 1926 a year later supporting the thought of the school. A committee including Bosch, Leroy Ioas and George Latimer was formed and Bosch donated his ranch to be used.

==== Themes of classes and sessions ====
Shoghi Effendi, then head of the religion, asked that the school be "…a testing ground for the application of those ideals and standards that are the distinguishing features of the Revelation of Bahá’u’lláh." The first official season came in 1927 with programs to which forty people came, above the anticipated dozen, from Santa Rosa, Cloverdale, Portland, and Vancouver.

===== Oneness of humanity =====
The committee was particularly conscious of the issue of the oneness of humanity because of communications with Louis G. Gregory and Sadie Mabry's recent talk at the national Bahá'í convention about the problem of race in America. Gregory was invited and planned to present in 1932 though his plans changed by that summer and all his classes were taught by others. African Americans are visible attending in photographs from 1938, and from 1939, and through much of the 1940s, and some in the 1950s one theme of the school was on racial diversity being a positive value including African Americans Rosa and John Shaw presence and talk in 1944 which was published in The Peoples Advocate. African American Jeynne Stapleton then of Sioux Falls, attended in 1946 too. Race continued to be a theme echoed in the 1960s.

===== Women leaders =====
There were talks about women leaders like Tahirih in and beyond the religion.

===== Bahá'í governance, teachings, and history =====
Unity Feast was held near around opening day of the session nearing July 4, though the specific date varied year to year. Courses were held on the Bahá'í administration, social and core spiritual teachings, Bahá'í history, Bahá'í pilgrimages and would introduce a Bahá'í appreciation of other religious traditions like Islam, Native American traditions etc., and public speaking, classes for children and youth led activities, recreation and social events.

==== Turning points ====
In 1936 the property was deeded to the US National Spiritual Assembly. 250 attendees came that year from India, Denmark, Peru, several provinces of Canada and western US states, the end of which saw the announcement of construction for a new dormitory at a conference called by the National Spiritual Assembly at the site, which was built in 1937 as a gift of Amelia Collins and her husband Thomas.

The school, along with its sister facilities of Louhelen Bahá'í School and Green Acre Bahá'í School closed for 1949-1950 to ensure funds were focused on completing the Bahá'í House of Worship in Wilmette for its dedication in 1952.

Bosch himself died in 1946, and his wife in 1952.

The last year of classes held in Geyserville was for the winter session of 1972-3. In 1973 the state of California finalized plans to expand the scenic Redwood Highway (HW101) including seizing the property through its eminent domain powers. Discussions of the plans dated back at least to 1959, and initial recommendations placed it east of the property, and later discussions favored missing the property to the west. Dwight W. Allen represented the Bahá'ís at one meeting. Even as late as 1966 the Bahá'ís were investing in new construction and hired an onsite property manager in 1967. Ultimately they didn't need the actual school site so it was auctioned June 26, 1973, by the California State Highway Department. There were six bidders for some 7.8 acres (32,000 m^{2}) of land along Highway 101, and the initial winning bid intended to develop an outdoor training track. The school was last administered by a committee and the resident manager, Waldo T. Boyd, while the local Bahá’ís community in Northern Sonoma County with its spiritual assembly numbered about 30 adults. The National Assembly appointed a committee of Firuz Kazemzadeh, John Kenton Allen, and John Cook to locate a new site for the school.

The summer 1973 season was held at Monte Toyon Camp in Aptos, California. The last session held at Geyserville was April 1974 as a farewell. The Geyserville location was also used in 1980 when the new owner of the land, Loreon Vigné, welcomed the Bahá’í to Isis Oasis Sanctuary which occupies ten acres of the original Bosch School site. Several subsequent Bahá’ís reunions have taken place there. John Bosch's residence (later the Library), the dormitory, the nine-pointed star garden, the Great Tree, and Mrs. Bosch's retirement cottage are all still in place.

==== Notable presenters ====
- Olympian Marion Holley appeared numerous times starting in 1932 and on into the 1940s.
- Artist Mark Tobey came as early as 1940.
- Notable Bahá'ís Agnes Alexander and Amelia Collins addressed the attendees several times from the 1940s and 50s.
- In 1945 then California Attorney General Robert W. Kenny spoke at the school's public session
- There were presentations by historian Firuz Kazemzadeh addressed the attendees many times in the 1940s and in 1957.
- African American formerly an attorney general for Ohios Helen Elsie Austin came out in 1947 for a couple of presentations.
- Actor O. Z. Whitehead spoke at the school in 1951.
- Writer and prominent Bahá'í Florence Mayberry and former Disney musical director Charles Wolcott came in 1956 and Mayberry returned in 1957, along with Dhikru'llah Khadem, a Hand of the Cause.
- Retired police chief Robert B. Powers came out in 1958.
- Richard St. Barbe Baker spoke in 1960 at the School.
- Dizzy Gillespie visited in 1969.

== Bosch School ==
The new "Bosch Bahá'í School" was opened in 1974, and named after John and Louise Bosch. The site had been an equestrian camp and was then 68 acres (280,000 m^{2}) in all, and most of it redwood forest. The proceedings of the dedication and about 400 attendees was filmed and the film shown in 1975.

The property is located in the Bonny Doon area of Santa Cruz, California. At the new school's dedication they named a redwood grove in memory of Hand of the Cause of God, Leroy Ioas, which was originally done at the old school. William Sears as well as a member of The Universal House of Justice, Amoz Gibson, were in attendance at the dedication.

Charles Wolcott, then a member of the head of the religion, the Universal House of Justice, and his wife came to Bosch in 1978 to give a presentation. In 1980 land was planned to allow recreational vehicles to be parked and a cabin for arts and crafts was constructed with a budget of some $40k. A further office building with a construction budget of $306k was initiated in 1983.

=== Programs and presentations ===
In 1987 Elderhostel (later Road Scholar), co-founder Martin Knowlton gave a talk on the program at Bosch, a program that began to be offered through the school.

Five nearby communities held Ridván observance and seminars in Bahá'í governance and principles in 1980 as well, and an open house in 1983. The program in 1986 noted work in human relations, music, psychology, racial unity, followed by ones on women's issues. In 1988 it hosted an international conference on peace. Across the fiscal year 1989-90 some 1900 Bahá'ís and some 375 non-Bahá'ís took part in programs, five-day sessions, winter sessions, academies, and classes, and with rentals to five other organizations. Summer sessions were held in 1994 including subjects "The Destiny of America through Spiritual Transformation" and "The Most Vital and Challenging Issue".

Wilmette Institute coordinated courses at Bosch in 1997, and aided coordinating a meeting of the leadership of the Baha’i Schools of Bosch, Louhelen, and Green Acre in Jan 1998.

In 2001 Bosch was among the places advertised for service opportunities of Bahá'í youth.

In October 2010 video and music producer Robert Gillies traveled to California from Boston for a "Music Industry Weekend" meeting and then gave workshops and was part of panels on video production in the internet age and music production at Bosch.

Bosch hosted the Irfan Colloquium in from 1998 through 2019 - events in 2020 and 2021 were delayed.

=== Facilities ===
Bosch Bahá'í School campus now comprises 85 acres (340,000 m^{2}) including cabins, a dining hall, conference and prayer room, pools, a playground, a bookstore-cafe, and forested land with trails. The property is used mainly for Bahá'í programs but is frequently leased out to nonprofit, educational, and/or service-oriented groups, and able to house 80 guests in 30 cabins/rooms and up to 175 attendees. When it first opened it could host about 60 guests. Year-round sessions are held on the religion and additional conferences and seminars in the summer and winter with room and board for a fee while being run mostly by volunteers.

=== Incidents at Bosch ===
A hostage crisis occurred for a few hours in August 17, 1977, which was settled peaceably when a transit bus had been hijacked by a former school employee and forced to drive to the school where about 70 adults and 30 children were meeting. He was found insane and committed to a state hospital.

The school campus was in the path of the CZU Lightning Complex Fire that started on August 16, 2020. The school lost several cabins but the main buildings including the administration building, library, lodge, and Martha Root Hall did not sustain much damage as a result of the fire.
