= Rahmatu'lláh Muhájir =

Iranian Bahá'í missionary

Raḥmatu'lláh Muhájir (Arabic: رحمةالله مُهاجر; 4 April 1923 – 1979) was a prominent fourth-generation Baháʼí, born in ʻAbdu'l-'Azím, Iran.

In 1953, Muhájir married Írán Furútan, the daughter of ʻAlí-Akbar Furútan and together they pioneered to the Mentawai Islands of Indonesia. For their service in responding to the calls of the Ten Year Crusade, they were both named as Knights of Baháʼu'lláh by Shoghi Effendi in March 1954. By the time he left the Mentawi Islands in 1958, Raḥmat Muhájir's teaching efforts in the Mentawi Islands had helped to establish 12 Baháʼí schools, 33 local Spiritual Assemblies and around 4,000 believers on Siberut Island.

Muhájir was elected as a member of the Regional Spiritual Assembly in 1957. In October that year, he was appointed a Hand of the Cause of God by Shoghi Effendi. In 1958, he and his family left Indonesia to travel all over the world, inspiring mass teaching campaigns in several countries. He died in Ecuador in 1979.
