= International Teaching Centre =

Baháʼí institution in Haifa, Israel

- Formation: June 14, 1976; 50 years ago
- Founder: Universal House of Justice
- Type: Baháʼí administration
- Headquarters: Baháʼí World Centre
- Location: Haifa, Israel
- Coordinates: 32.81152°N 34.98868°E

The International Teaching Centre (ITC; Persian: دارالتبلیغ بین‌المللی) is a Baháʼí institution based in the Baháʼí World Centre in Haifa, Israel. Its duties are to stimulate and coordinate the Continental Board of Counselors and assist the Universal House of Justice in matters relating to the teaching and protection of the faith.

The duties of the International Teaching Centre include coordinating, stimulating, and directing the activities of the Continental Boards of Counsellors and acting as liaison between them and the Universal House of Justice.

== History ==
The institution was first formed in 1973 by the Universal House of Justice, and the inaugural meeting was held on June 14, 1973. The International Teaching Centre originally consisted of the 17 Hands of the Cause of God still living at that time, plus three Counsellor members. The number of Counsellor members was raised to four in 1979, to seven in 1983, and finally to the current nine in 1988. The Counsellor members of the International Teaching Center are appointed by the Universal House of Justice to five-year terms that begin shortly after the International Convention and election of the Universal House of Justice. Members may be appointed to more than one term.

== Counsellor Members ==
Members are entered in the table under the year when they were first appointed. Starting with the first appointments in 1973, regular appointments have occurred every five years with appointments made in other years either due to the death of a member or the election of a member to the Universal House of Justice in one of the five by-elections to that body. All members have continued to serve after subsequent re-appointments by the Universal House of Justice. Members of the International Teaching Centre who were subsequently elected to the Universal House of Justice have their names italicized in the table.

1973	1979	1983	1988	1993	1998	2000	2003	2005	2008	2010	2013	2018	2023
Florence Mayberry		Peter Khan	Donald Rogers		Rolf von Czékus				Ayman Rouhani		Alison Milston	Gloria Javid	
Hooper Dunbar			Farzam Arbab	Shapoor Monadjem	Payman Mohajer			Stephen Hall		Praveen Kumar Mallik		Dinesh Kumar	
Aziz Yazdi			Hartmut Grossman				Shahriar Razavi		Juan Francisco Mora			Albert Nshisu Nsunga	Kanagaratnam Lakmeeharan
	Anneliese Bopp		Lauretta King				Paul Lample	Gustavo Correa	Stephen Birkland	Chuungu Malitonga	Mehranguiz Farid Tehrani		
		Masʼud Khamsi		Kiser Barnes		Zenaida Ramirez					Ramchand Coonjul	Holly Woodard	
		Isobel Sabri		Joan Lincoln							Antonella Demonte		
		Magdalene Carney		Kimiko Schwerin	Penelope Walker						Andrej Donoval		Amir Saberin
			Joy Stevenson		Firaydoun Javaheri		Rachel Ndegwa						
			Peter Vuyiya	Fred Schechter	Violette Haake				Uransaikhan Baatar			Navid Serrano	

== Publications ==
- Training Institutes: Attaining a Higher Level of Functioning (January 2017)
- Insights from the Frontiers of Learning (April 2013)
- Attaining Dynamics of Growth: Glimpses from Five Continents (April 2008)
- Building Momentum: A Coherent Approach to Growth (April 2003)

== See also ==
- Continental Counsellors
- Custodians
