= Abu'l-Qásim Faizi =

Persian Baháʼí

Abu'l-Qásim Faizi (born in Qom, 1906; died in Haifa, 19 November 1980) was a prominent Bahá’í educator, author and a Hand of the Cause. His parents, Abdol-Hossein Khan and Sediqeh, were both descendants of the renowned scholar Mohsen Fayz Kashani and were raised in a devout and scholarly environment. At the age of fifteen he moved with his family to Tehran, where he enrolled in the Tarbiyat School—an institution administered by the Bahá’ís. His association with Bahá’í teachers and participation in Bahá’í children's classes gradually led him to embrace the Bahá’í Faith.

In 1927 he travelled to Beirut to study English literature, using the opportunity to visit Shoghi Effendi in Haifa. Upon returning to Iran in 1934, he briefly worked for the Anglo-Iranian Oil Company, but his strong desire to serve the Bahá’í community prompted him to leave employment and move to Najafabad to teach Bahá’í children after their school had been closed down by the government.

Faizi married Gloria Ala’i in 1939. The couple later relocated from Najafabad to Qazvin and then to Iraq. Eventually they settled in Bahrain, becoming the first Bahá’ís to reside permanently in that country. Despite significant challenges, they remained there until 1958. During their years in Bahrain, Faizi taught English and worked tirelessly to strengthen the local Bahá’í community, earning widespread admiration for his efforts.

Shoghi Effendi called him the 'spiritual conqueror' of Arabia, and appointed him Hand of the Cause of God in 1957. The following year—after the passing of Shoghi Effendi—he was among the Hands who took up residence at the Bahá’í World Centre in Haifa to oversee the affairs of the global Bahá’í community. From that point onward, his life was characterized by constant travel and service, carrying him across the world from the Americas and Europe to Asia and the Pacific.

Faizi was also a gifted poet and accomplished calligrapher. Much of his work appeared as essays and short writings. He contributed to the periodical Rāh-e now (راه نو) and its successor Jahān-e now (جهان نو). He also translated several important works between Persian and English. Among them were The Priceless Pearl by Rúhíyyih Khánum—which he rendered into Persian under the title Gohar-i Yekta (گوهر یکتا)—and Bahjat al-Sudur (بهجت الصدور) by Haji Mirza Haydar-Ali, which he translated into English as Delight of Hearts.

== See also ==
- Hands of the Cause
