= International Baháʼí Council =

Former administrative institution of the Baháʼí Faith, active between 1951 and 1963

- Successor: Universal House of Justice
- Formation: 1951; 75 years ago
- Founder: Shoghi Effendi
- Dissolved: 1963; 63 years ago
- Type: Baháʼí administration
- Location: Haifa, Israel

The International Baháʼí Council (IBC) was an administrative institution of the Baháʼí Faith, first created in 1951 as a precursor to the Universal House of Justice, which replaced it in 1963.

== Formation ==
The following is a January 9, 1951 telex to the Baháʼí world from Shoghi Effendi announcing the Council:

Proclaim National Assemblies of East and West weighty epoch-making decision of formation of first International Baháʼí Council, forerunner of supreme administrative institution destined to emerge in fullness of time within precincts beneath shadow of World Spiritual Center of Faith already established in twin cities of 'Akká and Haifa....

In this telex Shoghi Effendi described the significance of the International Baháʼí Council:

...Hail with thankful, joyous heart at long last the constitution of International Council which history will acclaim as the greatest event shedding luster upon second epoch of Formative Age of Baháʼí Dispensation potentially unsurpassed by any enterprise undertaken since inception of Administrative Order of Faith on morrow of ʻAbdu'l-Bahá's Ascension, ranking second only to glorious immortal events associated with Ministries of the Three Central Figures of Faith in course of First Age of most glorious Dispensation of the five thousand century Baháʼí Cycle.

Shoghi Effendi also laid out several steps for the IBC's evolvement into the Universal House of Justice:

To these will be added further functions in course of evolution of this first embryonic International Institution, marking its development into officially recognized Baháʼí Court, its transformation into duly elected body, its efflorescence into Universal House of Justice, and its final fruition through erection of manifold auxiliary institutions constituting the World Administrative Center destined to arise and function and remain permanently established in close neighborhood of Twin Holy Shrines.

(Shoghi Effendi, Messages to the Baháʼí World – 1950–1957, pp. 7,8)

The appointed council represented the first international Baháʼí body. Mason Remey was appointed president of the council in March 1951 (prior to his appointment as a Hands of the Cause, which came in December 1951). A further announcement in March 1952 appointed several more officers to the Council and Rúhíyyih Khánum as the liaison between the Council and the Guardian.

== Evolution ==
=== Appointed International Baháʼí Council ===
In March 1951 Shoghi Effendi began appointing the membership of the IBC . During its first year, eight men and women were appointed. In 1952 two members had left due to reasons of health. In 1955 Shoghi Effendi appointed a ninth member. The members of the International Baháʼí Council, the dates of their appointment, their offices on the IBC and those that were Hands of the Cause were:

- Rúhíyyih Khanum (1951–61) Liaison with Shoghi Effendi; Hand of the Cause of God
- Charles Mason Remey (1951–61) President; Hand of the Cause
- Amelia Collins (1951–61) Vice President; Hand of the Cause
- Leroy Ioas (1952–61) Secretary General; Hand of the Cause
- Jessie Revell (1951–61) Treasurer
- Luṭfu'lláh Ḥakím (1951–61) Eastern Assistant Secretary
- Ethel Revell (1951–61) Western Assistant Secretary
- Ugo Giachery (1952–61) Member-at-large; Hand of the Cause
- Ben Weeden (1951–52)
- Gladys Weeden (1951–52)
- Sylvia Ioas (1955–61)

Between 1951 and 1957 Shoghi Effendi directed the members and used the Council to create an image of an international body handling the Baháʼí affairs in Haifa. According to Shoghi Effendi, the Council's responsibilities were to:

- establish links with the Israeli authorities, and
- negotiate with them concerning an establishing of a Baháʼí court to deal with personal matters,
- assist Shoghi Effendi to complete the superstructure of the Shrine of the Báb
- serve as an international Baháʼí secretariat.

=== Baháʼí Court ===
In Messages to the Baháʼí World – 1950–1957, Shoghi Effendi described the Baháʼí Court as an "essential prelude to the institution of the Universal House of Justice" (p. 13) and that the IBC "must pave the way for the formation of the Baháʼí Court." (p. 149) It was also cited as one of Shoghi Effendi's goals for the Ten Year Crusade. The Court was to come about as a result of its recognition as a legal non-Jewish religious court inside of the state of Israel and was to be composed of the appointed members from the IBC.(p. 152) Despite his efforts, the Court had not yet come into existence at the time of Shoghi Effendi's death in 1957.

From this point forward the IBC operated under the direction of the Custodial Hands of the Cause and they agreed to carry out Shoghi Effendi's plans for its evolvement.(Ministry of the Custodians, p. 37) In November 1959 the Hands announced to the Baháʼí world that the International Baháʼí Council would go from an appointed body to an elected body. They said: "We wish to assure the believers that every effort will be made to establish a Baháʼí Court in the Holy Land prior to the date set for this election. We should however bear in mind that the Guardian himself clearly indicated this goal, due to the strong trend towards the secularization of Religious Courts in this part of the world, might not be achieved." (Ministry of the Custodians, p. 169) The IBC's recognition as a Baháʼí court was never achieved.

In 1960 one of the members of the IBC, Charles Mason Remey, was declared as a Covenant-breaker by the Hands for claiming to be the Guardian and was expelled from the Baháʼí Faith.

=== Duly Elected Body ===
The election for the new International Baháʼí Council was scheduled for Ridvan 1961. The Hands of the Cause declared themselves ineligible for election and requested the Baháʼís not vote for them since the appointed institutions of the Baháʼí Faith were different in both nature and function from the elected administrative bodies. The election was concluded via postal ballot by all members of National Spiritual Assemblies and regional spiritual assemblies of 1960–61. All adult Baháʼís were eligible for election except for the Hands of the Cause. The members of the elected Council were:

- Ali Nakhjavani (1961–63) President
- Sylvia Ioas (1961–63) Vice President
- Charles Wolcott (1961–63) Secretary General
- Jessie Revell (1961–63) Treasurer
- Ian Semple (1961–63) Assistant Secretary
- Luṭfu'lláh Ḥakím (1961–63) Eastern Assistant Secretary
- Ethel Revell (1961–63) Western Assistant Secretary
- Borrah Kavelin (1961–63) Member-at-large
- Mildred Mottahedeh (1961–63)

The elected IBC was under the direction and supervision of the Hands of the Cause of God. The Council's responsibilities included two of the original functions assigned by Shoghi Effendi:

- to forge links with the Israeli authorities, and
- to negotiate with them related to matters of personal status.

In addition to these, the Hands instructed the Council to assist them with:

- the care of the properties at the World Centre,
- the establishment of the Universal House of Justice,
- any other functions they assigned.

=== Universal House of Justice ===
The election of the Universal House of Justice took place on Ridvan 1963. With this election, the International Baháʼí Council ceased to exist although five male members of the Council were elected.
