= Amelia Collins =

Amelia Engelder Collins (June 7, 1873 – January 1, 1962) was a prominent American Baháʼí from a Lutheran family. She became Baháʼí in 1919. She made large donations to several Baháʼí projects in Haifa, Israel, such as to the building of the Western Pilgrim House, the superstructure of the Shrine of the Báb the International Archives building and the purchasing of the land for the future Baháʼí House of Worship on Mount Carmel.

She was appointed a Hand of the Cause and vice-president of the International Baháʼí Council by Shoghi Effendi in 1951.
