= John Robarts (Baháʼí) =

Canadian Baháʼí

John Robarts

John Aldham Robarts (November 2, 1901 – June 18, 1991) was a prominent Canadian Baháʼí. He was born in 1901 in Waterloo, Ontario, to Aldham Wilson Robarts and Rachel Mary Montgomery-Campbell. His sister was Marjorie Campbell Robarts, who survived the sinking of the Allan liner RMS Hesperian in September 1915.

In 1957, Shoghi Effendi appointed Robarts a Hand of the Cause of God, the highest office to which an individual could be appointed in the Baháʼí Faith. His travels as a Hand included Southern Rhodesia, Morocco, Liberia, Cameroon, Japan, Korea, Taiwan, Hong Kong, the Philippines, Hawaii, Jamaica, Iceland, Australia, New Zealand, Tahiti, Fiji, Tonga, Papua New Guinea, Solomon Islands, New Caledonia, New Hebrides, and Western Samoa.

He died in Rawdon, Quebec, on 18 June 1991.
