= Horace Holley (Baháʼí) =

- Horace Holley, detail from larger photograph
- Born: April 7, 1887; Torrington, Connecticut, United States
- Died: July 1960 (aged 73); Haifa, Israel
- Title: Hand of the Cause
- Spouses: Bertha Herbert (m. 1909–1919) Doris Pascal (m. 1919)
- Children: Hertha (1910 or 1911, Italy); Marcia (1916, Greenwich Village, United States)

Horace Holley (April 7, 1887 in Torrington, Connecticut – July 12, 1960 in Haifa, Israel) was a prominent follower of the Baháʼí Faith, having been elected to several Spiritual Assemblies, appointed by Shoghi Effendi in 1951 as a Hand of the Cause, and later elected as one of the nine Custodians who stewarded the religion from 1957–1963.

Holley was born in Torrington, Connecticut in 1887. He was introduced to the Baháʼí Faith in 1909, and later served as a member and secretary to the Spiritual Assembly of the Baha'is of the United States and Canada, first being elected in 1923. He also became editor of World Unity Magazine. He was elected by his fellow Hands of the Cause as a Custodian in 1959. This being announced on Christmas Day of 1959 in the New York Times:

The National Spiritual Assembly of the Bahais announced today that Horace Holley had resigned as secretary as the chief steward of the faith at international headquarters in Haifa, Israel.

He and his wife Doris moved to Haifa, Israel, where he died July 12, 1960. He is buried at the foot of Mount Carmel in Haifa.

== Publications ==
=== Books ===
- 1913 - Bahá’ísm: The Modern Social Religion
- 1913 - The Inner Garden: A Book of Verse
- 1913 - The Stricken King, and Other Poems
- 1914 - Creation: Post-Impressionist Poems
- 1916 - Divinations and Creation
- 1916 - The Social Principle
- 1917 - Read-Aloud Plays
- 1921 - Bahá’í: The Spirit of the Age
- 1931 - The World Economy of Bahá’u’lláh
- 1939 - The Bahá’í Faith
- 1943 - The Bahá’í Principle of Civilization
- 1946 - The Revelation of Baha'u'llah
- 1953 - The Meaning of Worship
- 1954 - Challenge to Chaos
- 1954 - The God Who Walks with Men
- 1956 - Religion for Mankind

=== Study Guides ===
- 1939 - Deepening the Spiritual Life
- 1943 - ‘Abdu’l-Bahá and the Divine Plan

=== Compilations ===
- 1923 - Bahá’í Scriptures
