= Leroy Ioas =

Leroy Ioas, 1953, Israel

Leroy C Ioas (15 February 1896, Wilmington, Illinois - 22 July 1965, Haifa, Israel) was a Hand of the Cause of the Baháʼí Faith. His parents declared themselves Baháʼís in 1898 and took Ioas to meet ʻAbdu'l-Bahá during the latter's travels in the United States in 1912. Ioas moved to San Francisco after marrying Sylvia Kuhlman and soon became active in the local Baháʼí community.

== Service at the Baháʼí World Centre ==
The head of the Baháʼí Faith in the first half of the 20th century, Shoghi Effendi, appointed Ioas to the International Baháʼí Council, precursor to the Universal House of Justice, in December 1951, where he served until 1961 as secretary-general. In order to fulfill his duties, he quit his job in the railway industry, where he had worked for nearly forty years, and moved to Haifa, where he would reside until the end of his life.

He closely supervised the construction and completion of the Shrine of the Báb, for which Shoghi Effendi named the door on the octagon after him.

After the death of Shoghi Effendi, Ioas was among nine Hands of the Cause elected as a Custodian of the Baháʼí Faith on 25 November 1957. He travelled far and frequently to promote and expand the faith, even as his health weakened after heart problems began in 1953. His last trip, to eight areas in the United States during 1964, weakened him so much that he could not return to Haifa for six months and died less than a year later. He is buried in the Mount Carmel Baháʼí cemetery in Haifa.

== Works ==
- Ioas, Leroy C, Julia Lynch Chanler, and Mirza Ahmad Sohrab. Three Letters. New York: Caravan of East and West, 1954.

== Bibliography ==
- Adamson, Hugh C. "Ioas, Leroy C." Historical dictionary of the Baháʼí faith. Lanham, Maryland: Scarecrow Press, 2007.
- Chapman, Anita Ioas (1998). Leroy Ioas: Hand of the Cause of God. Oxford: George Ronald. ISBN 0-85398-426-3.
- Harper, Barron (1997). Lights of Fortitude (Paperback ed.). Oxford, UK: George Ronald. ISBN 0-85398-413-1.
