= ʻAlí-Akbar Furútan =

Prominent Iranian Baháʼí

- علی‌اکبر فروتن
- Born: 29 April 1905; Sabzivár, Khurásán, Iran
- Died: 26 November 2003 (aged 98); Haifa, Israel
- Education: University of Moscow (expelled)
- Occupations: Educator, author

Religious life
- Religion: Baháʼí

Senior posting
- Post: Hand of the Cause of God

National Spiritual Assembly, Iran
- In office 1934–1957

Custodians of the Baháʼí World Centre
- In office 1959–1963

ʻAlí-Akbar Furútan (Persian: علی‌اکبر فروتن; 29 April 1905 – 26 November 2003) was a prominent Iranian Baháʼí educator and author who was given the rank of Hand of the Cause in 1951.

== Biography ==
A native of Sabzivár in what was, at the time, Iran's Khurásán, ʻAlí-Akbar Furútan was still a child when he witnessed the persecution of his family and others for their beliefs. Seeking safety, the family moved in 1914 from Sabzivár to Ashkhabad in Turkestan, which was then a part of the Russian Empire. In 1926, nine years after the Russian Revolution, 21-year-old Furútan won a scholarship to the University of Moscow, where he studied education and child psychology. Within four years, as a result of his Baháʼí activities, he was expelled from the Soviet Union and, in 1930, returned to Iran.

After he returned to Iran, he and his wife helped administer the Tarbiyat School for Boys, which was later closed by the Pahlavi government.

Later, ʻAlí-Akbar Furútan was elected to the National Spiritual Assembly of Iran in 1934, serving as its secretary until 1957. In December 1951, he was appointed a Hand of the Cause of God by Shoghi Effendi. From 1959 to 1963, he served as one of the nine Custodians at the Baháʼí World Centre in Haifa, Israel.

Throughout his life, ʻAlí-Akbar Furútan taught Baháʼí classes for children and youth, and he published many works in the area of child spiritual and material education.

ʻAli-Akbar Furútan died in Haifa, 98 years old.

== Works ==
- Baháʼí Education for Children (6 volumes; originally Kitab-i-Dars-i-Akhlagh ("Books for Moral Education"))
- Furútan, ʻAlí-Akbar (1980). Mothers, Fathers and Children: Practical Advice to Parents. Oxford, UK: George Ronald. ISBN 0-85398-095-0.
- Furútan, ʻAlí-Akbar, ed. (1986). Stories of Baháʼu'lláh. Oxford, UK: George Ronald. ISBN 0-85398-243-0.
- Furútan, ʻAlí-Akbar (1984) [1977]. The Story of My Heart. Oxford, UK: George Ronald. ISBN 0-85398-115-9.
- Several books in Persian.
