= Institution of the Counsellors =

Institution of the Baháʼí Faith

- Formation: 1968; 58 years ago
- Founder: Universal House of Justice
- Type: Baháʼí administration
- Headquarters: Baháʼí World Centre
- Location: Haifa, Israel

The Institution of the Counsellors (Persian: مؤسسهٔ مشاورین, romanized: mošāwerīn) is the current appointed branch in the administrative system of the Baháʼí Faith. It consists of the 9 International Counsellors of the International Teaching Centre, the 90 Continental Counsellors, their Auxiliary Board Members, and assistants. The Counsellors, a respected and high-ranking position, are appointed to 5-year renewable terms, and organized into boards working on 5 continents that are coordinated by the International Teaching Centre.

The Institution of the Counsellors was created in 1968 by the Universal House of Justice to perpetuate the work done previously by the Hands of the Cause. The functions of the institution are generally "protection" from schism and "propagation", or spreading, of the religion at an international level. Members of the institution have no legislative or executive power, and do not fill the role of clergy, but they are tasked with "stimulating, counseling, and assisting" the elected institutions and Baháʼí communities generally. They fill a largely advisory and inspirational role.

The continental and international Counsellors are appointed by the Universal House of Justice, the supreme institution of the religion. Continental Counsellors appoint Auxiliary Boards, who in turn appoint assistants. When including the Hands of the Cause, the whole structure is sometimes called the 'appointed branch' of the religion, or the 'Institution of the Learned', to contrast it with the elected Spiritual Assemblies. All members of the institution, from the International Teaching Centre to Auxiliary Board members serve 5-year terms that begins on the Day of the Covenant, which falls on either November 25 or 26, except for local Assistants, whose duration of service is "left to each Continental Board to decide for itself".

There are no formal qualifications, pre-requisites, or training needed to be appointed to the Institution of the Counsellors.

== International Teaching Centre ==
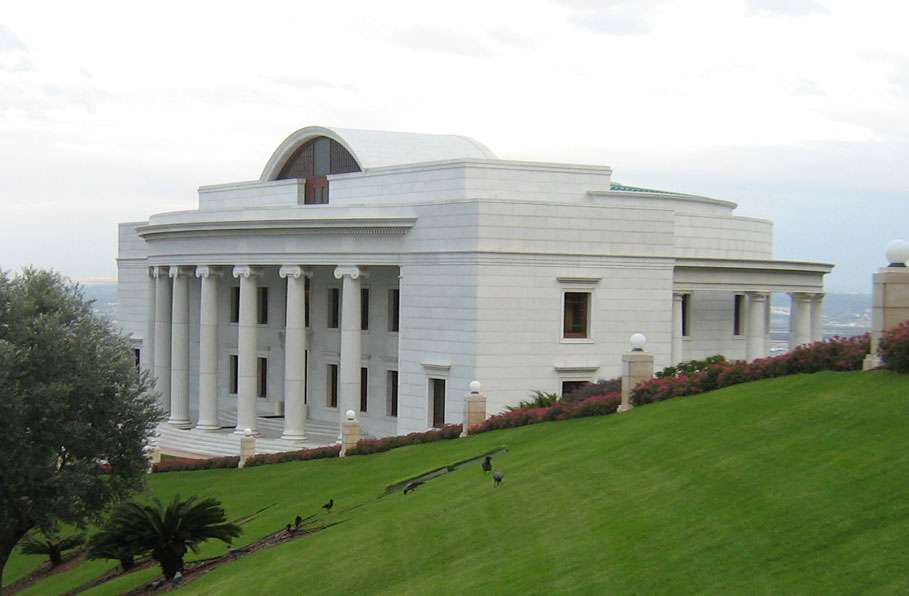
The International Teaching Centre Building

The International Teaching Centre is a board of nine Counsellors that was created in June 1973 to extend the role of the Hands of the Cause resident at the Baháʼí World Centre. It operates from a building on the Baháʼí arc next to the Universal House of Justice. The announcement of its creation outlined its duties: "co-ordinate, stimulate and direct" the Continental Counsellors and act as liaison to the House of Justice; provide reports and recommendations to the Universal House of Justice and advice to the Counsellors; be alert to opportunities for growth of the religion; and "determine and anticipate" needs for teaching and propose teaching plans.

All Hands of the Cause were initially members of the board, as well as three Counsellors. Over time, as Hands of the Cause grew older and could not be replaced, the board transitioned to four Counsellors in 1979, seven in 1983, and to the present nine in 1988.

The Counsellors of the International Teaching Centre also serve 5-year terms.

The International Teaching Centre is responsible with overseeing the security and ensuring the protection of the Baha'i faith. It must investigate all cases of Covenant-breaking with the help of the Continental Counsellors and their auxiliaries, evaluate their reports and decide whether to expel the offender from the Baha'i faith, they submit their decisions to the Universal House of Justice for its final words.

== Continental Boards of Counsellors ==
The Continental Boards of Counsellors are responsible for protecting and propagating the Baháʼí Faith at a continental level, as well as informing the Baháʼí World Centre of developments in their area. As individuals they are known as 'Continental Counsellors'.

Numbers of Boards and Counsellors by year
Year	Total Boards	Total Continental Counsellors	Hands of the Cause still living
1957	0	0	27
1968	11	36	22
1973	12	57	18
1980	5	57	14
1985	5	72	9
1995	5	81	3
2020	5	90	0

They were created to perpetuate the role of the Hands of the Cause, who could no longer be appointed after 1957. They outrank the National Spiritual Assemblies, though only in an advisory role since they have no administrative authority, but they are regarded as lower than the Hands. The announcement of their creation on 21 June 1968 also changed the Hands of the Cause from continental to worldwide appointments. The Counsellors took on the responsibility of directing the work of the Auxiliary Boards, appointees working closer with local communities, and one Counsellor from each board was appointed as the trustee of funds. At first the Hands resident in Haifa directed the boards of Counsellors, until the International Teaching Centre was created in 1973.

Upon their creation in 1968 there were 11 distinct boards: three each in Africa, the Americas, and Asia, and one each for Australia and Europe. In 1980 that arrangement was changed to five boards: one each in Africa, the Americas, Asia, Australia, and Europe.

The term of Continental Counsellors is 5 years, though the term length may be changed at the discretion of the Universal House of Justice. If a Continental Counsellor is appointed to the International Teaching Centre, they must relinquish their role on the continental board, and if they are elected to the Universal House of Justice, they cease to be a Counselor.

Some of the duties assigned to the Counsellors include directing the Auxiliary Boards in their area, advising National Spiritual Assemblies, keeping the Universal House of Justice informed of conditions in their area, and "stimulating, counseling and assisting" individuals and local and national Spiritual Assemblies. In addition, advising the regional Baháʼí councils became part of their duties when they were created in 1997.

== Auxiliary Boards ==
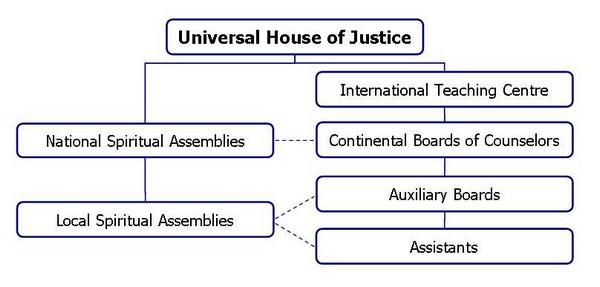
A diagram of the present Baháʼí administrative order, with the appointed branch on the right side.

The Auxiliary Boards were created in April 1954 by Shoghi Effendi to assist the Hands of the Cause. The first group of Auxiliary Board members were organized on a continental basis, similar to the Hands themselves. The first boards continued focusing on teaching work and a second set of boards were created in October 1957 to focus on the job of 'protection', that is, maintaining unity and responding to attacks by enemies of the Baháʼís.

The boards were transitioned in 1968 to the jurisdiction of the Continental Counsellors, appointed to a geographic area. Unlike the Counsellors, Auxiliary Board Members are designated as either "protection" or "propagation". Those dedicated to protection focus on responding to or preventing opposition, while those dedicated to propagation focus on encouraging Baháʼí communities in their teaching work. They are generally not permitted to be members of any elected institution. If they are elected as a delegate to the national convention, or to the national spiritual assembly, they must choose between that role or being a board member. If elected to the Universal House of Justice, they must join the House of Justice and cease to be members of the board.

Initially in 1957 there were 72 Auxiliary Board members appointed. 50 years later, there were about 1,000.

=== Assistants ===
Due to the rapid growth of the religion around the world, the Universal House of Justice in 1973 allowed Auxiliary Board members to appoint their own assistants to maintain adequate contact with assemblies and individuals in their areas. In 2008 there were about twelve thousand such assistants worldwide. Unlike other members of the Institution of the Counsellors, assistants to the Auxiliary Board may serve on Spiritual Assemblies, and are sometimes youth.

== Functions ==
The institutions within the Baháʼí administrative structure, both elected and appointed, share the goal to serve for two primary functions: Protection and Propagation. In this context, Protection refers to defending the organization against threats to its integrity, like schism; while Propagation involves organized efforts to draw new members to the Baháʼí Faith, such as through missionary activities. Aligned with these two aims, two distinct yet complementary Auxiliary Boards exist, as it was instructed by Shoghi Effendi in the 1950s.

=== Protection ===
Shoghi Effendi charged the Auxiliary Boards for Protection with "the specific duty of watching over the security of the Faith". In a letter from the Universal House of Justice to the International Teaching Centre, dated 10 October 1976, it is mentioned:

the Auxiliary Boards for Protection should keep 'constantly' a 'watchful eye' on those 'who are known to be enemies or to have been put out of the Faith', discreetly 'investigate' their activities, warn intelligently the friends of the opposition inevitably to come, explain how each crisis in God's Faith has always proved to be a blessing in disguise, prepare them for the 'dire contests' which are 'destined to range the Army of Light against the forces of darkness', and, when the influence of the enemies spreads and reaches their fold, the members of these Auxiliary Boards should be alert to their schemes to 'dampen the zeal and sap the loyalty' of the believers and, by adopting 'wise and effective measures', counteract these schemes and arrest the spread of their influence...
