= Hands of the Cause =

Category of life-appointed positions in Baháʼí Faith

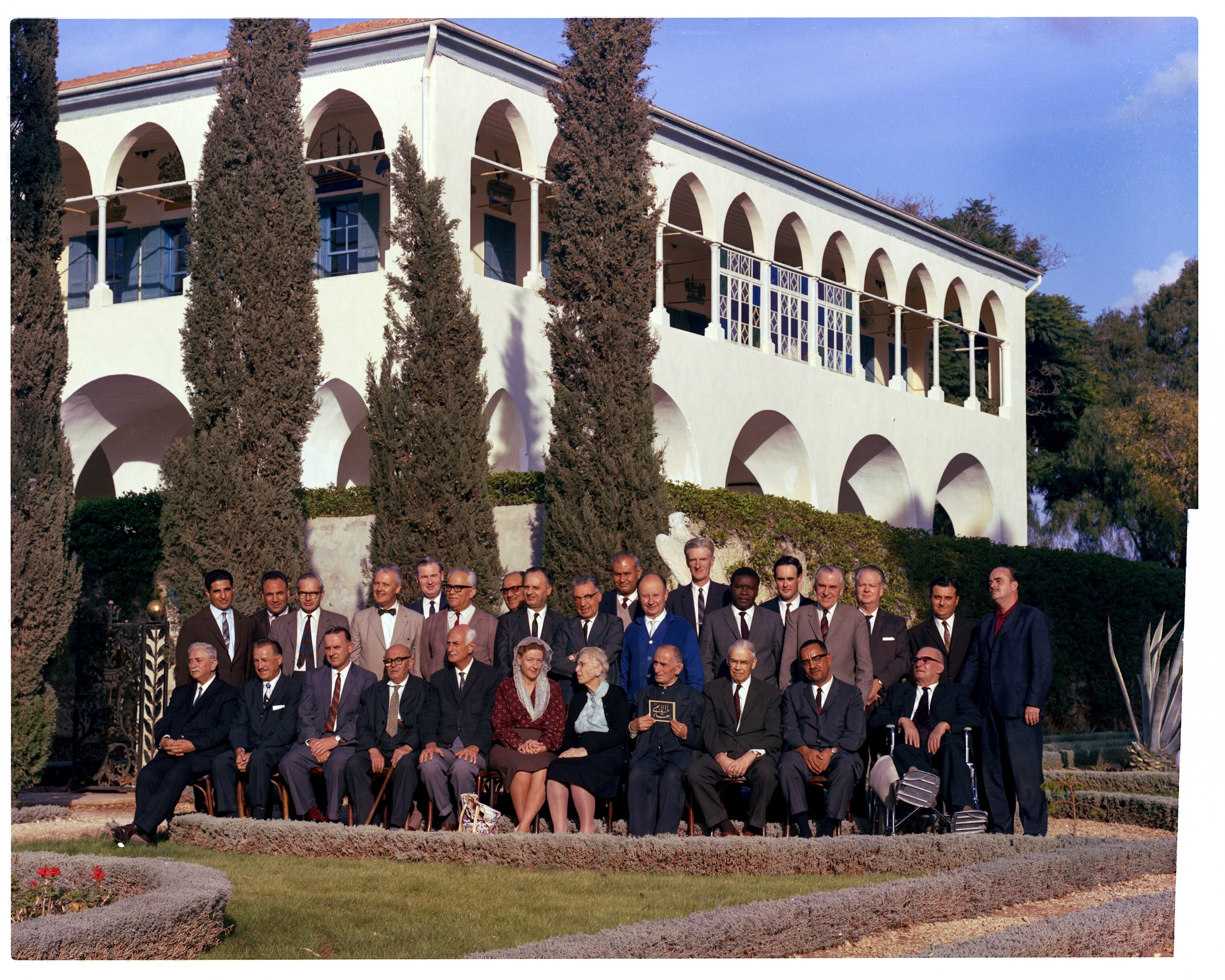
Members of the Universal House of Justice with the Hands of the Cause in front of the Mansion of Bahjí, 1963

Hands of the Cause of God (abbreviated as Hands or Hands of the Cause), in the Baháʼí Faith, refers to several prominent Baha'is appointed for life by Baha'u'llah, 'Abdu'l-Baha', and Shoghi Effendi to promote the Baháʼí teachings and preserve the unity of the Baháʼí Faith community. Each one of the appointees is referred to as a Hand of the Cause. Of the fifty individuals given the title, Baha'u'llah appointed four during his lifetime; 'Abdu'l-Baha' also posthumously designated four individuals as Hands of the Cause; and afterwards, Shoghi Effendi appointed forty-two to this rank over the 36 years of his ministry. Hands of the Cause played a significant role in propagating the religion and protecting it from schism.

'Abdu'l-Baha' formally defined the role of these prominent Baháʼís, elaborated on their responsibilities, and emphasized their importance. In his Will and Testament, he stated that the responsibility for appointing and guiding the Hands in the future would rest with his successor, Shoghi Effendi. A few weeks before his death in November 1957, Shoghi Effendi appointed the final group of the Hands, and in a letter to the Baháʼís of the world, referred to the Body of the Hands as the Chief Stewards of the Baháʼí Faith. This Body of 27 men and women assumed the leadership and guidance of the worldwide Baháʼí community for six years following the death of Shoghi Effendi, until the election of the Universal House of Justice in April 1963. In the administrative structure of the Baháʼí Faith, authority is not held by individuals; rather, decisions are made collectively through consultation in Baháʼí councils. The supreme governing institution is the Universal House of Justice in the Baháʼí Faith.

The temporary administration of the affairs of the faith by the Hands until the formation of the Universal House of Justice was foreseen in the Kitab-i-Aqdas. After its establishment in April 1963, the Universal House of Justice created the Institution of the Counsellors in 1968, and the appointed Continental Counsellors over time took on the role that the Hands of the Cause were filling. The functions of the Hands were gradually transferred to newly formed institutions of Continental Boards of Counsellors and subsequently the International Teaching Center, whose membership included five Counsellors from around the world and all living Hands of the Cause as permanent members. The announcement in 1968 also changed the role of the Hands of the Cause, from continental appointments to worldwide. As the Hands of the Cause died, the number of the Counsellors serving at the International Teaching Centre reached nine and took on the functions of the nine Hands of the Cause who worked in the Baháʼí World Centre in the lifetime of Shoghi Effendi until the establishment of the International Teaching Center.

== Brief history ==
In the Baháʼí Faith, the appointment of distinguished individuals with the title of Hands of the Cause of God (Ayádí-yi Amru'lláh) began during the time of Baháʼu'lláh. After Him, His successor ʻAbdu'l-Bahá, who is known as the Center of the Covenant of Baháʼu'lláh, referred to several Baháʼís as Hands of the Cause in one of his books titled Memorials of the Faithful. ʻAbdu'l-Bahá elaborated on the appointment process and duties of the Hands in his Will (Alwáḥ-i-Waṣáyá) and assigned the responsibility of appointing them to the Guardian of the Baháʼí Faith.

Shoghi Effendi, the successor of ʻAbdu'l-Bahá, appointed individuals to the position of Hands of the Cause of God during his lifetime. He gradually appointed 42 individuals from various parts of the world to this role. In total, 50 individuals were designated as Hands of the Cause: 4 by Baháʼu'lláh, 4 by ʻAbdu'l-Bahá, and 42 by Shoghi Effendi, bringing the total of 50 Hands of the Cause in the Baháʼí Faith.

After the death of Shoghi Effendi in 1957 and until the establishment of the Universal House of Justice the Hands of the Cause collectively as Custodians, led the worldwide Baháʼí community based on the guidance of Shoghi Effendi, as expressed in his final message to the Baháʼís of the world dated October 2, 1957, just weeks before his sudden death. The 27 living Hands continued their activities, focusing on protecting and preserving the Baháʼí community and encouraging the believers to fulfill the goals of Shoghi Effendi's Ten Year Plan, which ultimately led to the election of the Universal House of Justice in April 1963.

In a message (November 1964) the Universal House of Justice announced that since it was no longer possible to appoint Hands of the Cause, the need was the development of new institutions; the Continental Boards of Counsellors (1968) and the International Teaching Centre (1973) to fulfil functions of the Hands of the Cause.

The Hands, in consultation with the Universal House of Justice, served their purpose for the remainder of their lives. The last surviving Hand of the Cause, ʻAlí-Muhammad Varqá, died in 2007.

== Appointments ==
In total, four Hands were named by Baháʼu'lláh, four by ʻAbdu'l-Bahá, and forty-two by Shoghi Effendi.

=== Appointed by Baháʼu'lláh (1863–1892) ===
- Adíb (1848–1919)
- Hají Ákhúnd (1842–1910)
- Ibn-i-Asdaq (d.1928)
- Ibn-i-Abhar (d.1917)

These four Hands served as a means of communication between Bahá’u’lláh and the Baháʼís of Iran. After Baháʼu'lláh's death, they played a crucial role in supporting the succession of ‘Abdu’l-Bahá and in maintaining the unity of the Baháʼí community. In 1899, at the instruction of ‘Abdu’l-Bahá, they established the first Baháʼí Spiritual Assembly in Tehran.

=== Appointed posthumously by ʻAbdu'l-Bahá (1892–1921) ===
‘Abdu’l-Bahá, the eldest son and appointed successor of Bahá’u’lláh, guided the four individuals who, after the death of Bahá'u'lláh, continually and actively followed him in his ministry. These individuals played a prominent role in protecting the Baháʼí Faith against attacks by the supporters of Muhammad-‘Alí, the younger half-brother of ‘Abdu’l-Bahá, who challenged his authority as the appointed successor of Bahá’u’lláh.

In the book Tadhkirat al-Wafá (Memorials of the Faithful), ‘Abdu’l-Bahá mentioned four prominent Baháʼís who, throughout their lives, devoted themselves to spreading the Baháʼí teachings and promoting its principles and ethics with selflessness, referring to them posthumously as Hands of the Cause of God. These individuals are:

- Muhammad-Ridá (Mullá Muhammad Ábádí Yazdí)
- Nabíl-i-Akbar (Aqa Muhammad-i- Qa'ini) (1829–1892)
- 'Ali-Muhammad Varqá (d. 1896), who, along with his son Rúḥu’lláh, gave his life for the promotion of the Baháʼí Faith teachings.
- Mullá Sádiq Khurasani, also known among the Baháʼís as Ismu'lláhu'l-Asdaq (d. 1889)

== Ministry of Shoghi Effendi (1921–1957) ==
Shoghi Effendi appointed distinguished Baháʼís known as "Hands of the Cause of God" in five phases, recognizing their sacrificial and outstanding efforts in promoting and protecting the unity of the Baháʼí Faith through education and the spread of Baháʼí Teachings.

=== First Phase: Posthumous Appointments ===
- John Ebenezer Esslemont (1874–1925) – Scotland
- Hájí Amín (1831–1928) – Iran
- Keith Ransom-Kehler (1876–1933) – US
- Martha Root (1872–1939) – US
- John Henry Hyde Dunn (1855–1941) – Australia
- Siyyid Mustafá Rúmí (d. 1942) – Burma (now Myanmar)
- 'Abdu'l-Jalil Bey Sa'd (d. 1942) – Egypt
- Muhammed Taqiy-i-Isfáhani (d. 1946) – Egypt
- Roy C. Wilhelm (1875–1951) – US
- Louis George Gregory (1874–1951) – US

=== Second Phase: Appointed individually at different times ===
Shoghi Effendi appointed the following individuals at various times. (appointment year for each is in brackets)

- Amatu'l-Bahá Rúḥíyyih K͟hánum (1910–2000) [1952] --Baháʼí World Centre
- Jalál K͟háḍih (1897–1990) [1953] – Iran
- Paul Edmond Haney (1909–1982) [1954] – US
- ʻAlí-Muhammad Varqá (1911–2007) [1955] – Iran
- Agnes Baldwin Alexander (1875–1971) [1957] – Hawaii

=== Third Phase: the First contingent, appointed 24 December 1951 ===
- Dorothy Beecher Baker (1898–1954) – US
- Amelia Engelder Collins (1873–1962) – US
- ʻAlí-Akbar Furútan (1905–2003) – Iran
- Ugo Giachery (1896–1989) – Italy
- Hermann Grossmann (1899–1968) – Germany
- Horace Hotchkiss Holley (1887–1960) – US
- Leroy C. Ioas (1896–1965) – US
- William Sutherland Maxwell (1874–1952) – Canada
- Taráz'u'lláh Samandarí (1874–1968) – Iran
- Valíyu'lláh Varqá (1884–1955) – Iran
- George Townshend (1876–1957) – Ireland
- Charles Mason Remey (1874–1974) – US

=== Fourth Phase: Second contingent, appointed 29 February 1952 ===
- Siegfried Schopflocher (1877–1953) – Canada
- S͟hu'á'u'lláh ʻAláʼí (1889–1984) – Iran
- Músá Banání (1886–1971) – Africa
- Clara Dunn (1869–1960) – Oceania
- D͟hikru'lláh K͟hádim (1904–1986) – Iran
- Adelbert Mühlschlegel (1897–1980) – Germany
- Corinne Knight True (1861–1961) – US

=== Fifth Phase: Last contingent, appointed 2 October 1957 ===
This final group was appointed a few weeks before Shoghi Effendi's death:

- Hasan Muvaqqar Balyúzí (1908–1980) – British Isles
- Abu'l-Qásim Faizi (1906–1980) – Arabian Peninsula
- John Graham Ferraby (1914–1973) – British Isles
- Harold Collis Featherstone (1913–1990) – Oceania
- Rahmatu'lláh Muhájir (1923–1979) – Pacific Ocean
- Enoch Olinga (1926–1979) – Africa-Uganda
- John Aldham Robarts (1901–1991) – South-Western Africa
- William Sears (1911–1992) – South-Western Africa

== Responsibilities ==
‘Abdu’l-Bahá, in His "Will and Testament", outlined both the method of appointment and the primary responsibilities of the Hands of the Cause of God. The Hands were to be appointed by His successor, Shoghi Effendi.

Their two main responsibilities were:

1. Protection of the Baháʼí Faith
  - Guarding the unity of the Baháʼí community
  - Defending the Faith against division, schism, and opposition
2. Propagation of the Baháʼí Teachings
  - Encouraging education and study of the Baháʼí Writings
  - Promoting moral and spiritual leadership
  - Inspiring and guiding the community in its teaching efforts

‘Abdu’l-Baha, in his "Will and Testament" asks the Hands of the Cause of God to be "ever watchful" and "so soon as they find anyone beginning to oppose and protest against the Guardian of the Cause of God, cast him out from the congregation of the people of Baha and in no wise accept any excuse from him."

== Duties and functions as an institution ==
=== Further structure ===
In 1951, Shoghi Effendi revived the Institution of the Hands of the Cause as a functioning group with no legislative, executive, or judicial authority and was entirely exempt from the priestly function of making authoritative interpretations of the sacred writings of the Faith. The group was to assist the national spiritual assemblies in meeting their set goals of expansion and consolidation of Baháʼí Faith communities in their areas of jurisdiction. Later, their responsibilities expanded to the protection of the Faith from external and internal attacks. By 1957, the original appointed group of twelve had reached twenty-seven. The group included individuals from all continents, plus several members of the first International Council. The continental Hands assisted the Baháʼís with a system of transnational coordination and a form of leadership that differed significantly from that of the assemblies. With the sudden death of Shoghi Effendi, they were to exercise overall headship of the Baháʼís during the period between the death of Shoghi Effendi and the establishment of the Universal House of Justice (1957–1963). During the years 1951–1957, Shoghi Effendi provided further administrative structure and expanded roles for the Hands of the Cause:

1. Continental Coordination
  - A group of resident Hands at the Baháʼí World Centre in Haifa acted as the liaison between the Guardian and the Continental Hands.
  - All Hands were responsible for building relationships with National Spiritual Assemblies to support their efforts.
2. Support of the Ten-Year Expansion Plan (1953–1963)
  - Hands of the Cause were tasked with assisting in achieving the global goals of the Ten-Year Plan.
  - This included support in pioneering, expansion, consolidation, and protection efforts.
3. Delegation of Authority to Continental Hands of the Cause
  - Continental Hands were given authority to determine:
    - The areas of operation for their appointed Auxiliary Boards
    - Secondary decisions related to the growth and collaboration of teaching efforts
    - Coordination with National Institutions
4. Continental Baháʼí Funds
  - Shoghi Effendi established five Continental Baháʼí Funds, one for each of the continents:
  - Africa, the Americas, Asia, Oceania, and Europe
  - These funds were supported only by Baháʼís and intended to assist with the execution of the Hands' responsibilities.

=== Spread of the Baháʼí Teachings ===
Shoghi Effendi, although following the instructions in the Will and Testament of `Abdu'l-Bahá, continued to expand on the responsibilities of the Hands of the Cause of God in terms of two main tasks: the spread of the Baháʼí Teachings and safeguarding the unity of the Baháʼí Faith. However, in the first five years of his leadership, the tasks he assigned to the Hands of the Cause were entirely focused on spreading the Baháʼí Faith. In 1953, Shoghi Effendi unveiled a comprehensive plan known as the Ten-Year Crusade, which aimed at spreading the Baháʼí Faith worldwide. The goals included increasing the number of Baháʼí National and Regional Assemblies from 12 countries to 48 countries and the establishment of the Universal House of Justice, the highest decision-making body in the Baháʼí Administration. Shoghi Effendi referred to the Hands of the Cause as the vanguards of this plan.

In the same year, he asked five Hands of the Cause to represent him at four intercontinental conferences held to launch the Plan. After the plan commenced, with each new National or Regional Assembly formed (sixteen new National and Regional Assemblies were established by October 1957), Shoghi Effendi sent one of the Hands of the Cause to represent him at the founding session of that Assembly. He also instructed the Hands to establish a nine-member body, known as the "Auxiliary Board," for each continent, to facilitate the spreading of the Baháʼí Faith. These Auxiliary Boards acted as representatives and assistants to the Hands of the Cause, working alongside the National Assemblies of their respective continents. Additionally, to support the Hands and their Auxiliary Boards, Shoghi Effendi established a Continental Fund for each continent and entrusted one of the Hands to oversee it.

During the Ten-Year Crusade, members of the Auxiliary Boards regularly visited Baháʼí communities and provided guidance and encouragement for the execution of the goals of the Plan. The Hands of the Cause also provided counsel to the National Assemblies.

=== Preserving the Unity of the Baháʼí Communities ===
`Abdu'l-Bahá, in his Will, instructs the Baháʼís and the Hands of the Cause of God to preserve the unity of the Baháʼí community by following the Guardian, who was appointed to manage and guide the Baháʼí communities and, after `Abdu'l-Bahá, is the reference point for the Baháʼí Faith. The goal is to prevent division and discord within the community. In this regard, the Hands of the Cause consistently worked to maintain the integrity and cohesion of the Baháʼí community, taking measures to avoid any form of division or conflict.

Following Shoghi Effendi's guidance, a few years after the establishment of the Auxiliary Boards for the spread of the Baháʼí Faith, new Auxiliary Boards were also formed to help preserve the unity of the Baháʼí community. These Boards assisted the Hands of the Cause in fulfilling this important responsibility in their respective continents.

=== Collaboration with the National Assemblies ===
Shoghi Effendi assigned the responsibility of collaborating with and advising the National Baháʼí Assemblies to the Hands of the Cause in two areas: protecting the community from division and discord, and spreading the Baháʼí Teachings. National Assemblies are nine-member bodies elected by Baháʼís annually, which manage the affairs of the Baháʼí community at the national or regional level. To facilitate such a collaboration, the appointed assistants to the Hands on different continents, as members of the Auxiliary Boards, went to work. The first group, formed in 1953, was tasked with spreading the teachings of the Baháʼí Faith, while the second group was established three years later, in 1956, to maintain the unity of the Faith.

=== Encouraging Learning and Education ===
In addition to their other responsibilities, most of the Hands of the Cause worked in the field of encouraging learning and education through research, writing, and content creation for the mass media, which was usually accompanied by international travels. Several Hands of the Cause, who were prominent writers before their appointment, continued their services through writing.

For example, Horace Holley, who had been a prolific writer for many years, when appointed to the rank of Hand of the Cause, authored a series of articles titled Religion for Mankind along with several pamphlets and books about the Baháʼí Faith. George Townshend, who had been a high-ranking Christian clergy and prolific writer, wrote books such as The Heart of the Gospel and Christ and Bahá'u'lláh after he was appointed Hand of the Cause. John Ferraby wrote a widely-read book introducing the Baháʼí Faith, titled All Things Made New: A Comprehensive Account of the Baháʼí Faith. Hermann Grossmann, who had been writing about the Baháʼí Faith since the 1920s, produced additional works on the subject in German, including the books What is the Baháʼí Faith? and Who is a Baháʼí and What is the Baháʼí Community?. He also translated works of Bahá'u'lláh and 'Abdu'l-Bahá into German. Ruhiyyih Khanum, the wife of Shoghi Effendi, who had written a popular book titled A Prescription for Living in 1950, after her appointment to the rank of Hand of the Cause, authored several other books, including a biography of Shoghi Effendi titled The Priceless Pearl and a poetry book. She also produced two long documentaries about her travels in South America and the Baháʼí Faith shrines in the cities of Haifa and Akká. Hasan Balyuzi, who could no longer travel after 1963 due to health issues, focused on research and scholarly work until he died in 1980, producing important scholarly works on the lives and missions of key Baháʼí figures. Abul-Qasim Faizi wrote numerous books and articles and translated works between English and Persian, such as the book The Priceless Pearl, which he translated into Persian. He also wrote a book, Milly, about the life of Hand of the Cause Amelia Collins. Ugo Giachery, in addition to his various travels to meet Baháʼí communities, authored a book titled Shoghi Effendi: Recollections. Ali-Akbar Furutan produced a significant body of scholarly work on the education and upbringing of children in Persian, which was translated into English and other languages, including Mothers, Fathers, and Children, A Practical Guide to Parenting, The Path of Raising Young Children, and Scientific Essays. William Sears produced a television program series on the Baháʼí Faith and organized lectures and presentations on the subject. He also wrote a series of popular books about the Baháʼí Faith, including Thief in the Night, The Wine of Astonishment, God Loves Laughter, and A Cry from the Heart: Bahá'ís of Iran.

== Rank of the Hands of the Cause ==
In the Baháʼí Faith the Hands of the Cause of God are regarded as individuals who have been appointed to this high rank because of their role in preserving unity and promoting the Baháʼí Faith through self-sacrifice and humility. Abdu'l-Bahá, in describing the Hands of the Cause, says that they are those who dedicated themselves to the dissemination of the Baháʼí teachings, severed all ties with anything other than God, lived a life of piety, and ignited the hearts of God's servants with the fire of divine love. He also mentions that their purity and spirituality have made an impact on the hearts of people, drawing them toward good character, righteous intentions, and justice. However, the Hands of the Cause should not be confused with the clergy, as Bahá'u'lláh abolished the institution of the ecclesiastic in the Baháʼí Faith. Instead, the administration of local, national, and international Baháʼí affairs is entrusted to elected and appointed Baháʼí in consultative councils, who make decisions based on the principles outlined in the writings of Bahá'u'lláh and Abdu'l-Bahá. The role of the Hands of the Cause is seen as one of spiritual guidance and service, but without formal clerical authority. The Hands of the Cause are also referred to by Shoghi Effendi as the Chief Stewards of Baháʼu'lláh's embryonic World Commonwealth.

== Management of the Baháʼí World ==
A few weeks before his death, Shoghi Effendi sent a message (October 1957) to the Bahá’ís of the world in which he referred to the Hands of the Cause of God as the "Chief Stewards of the embryonic World Order of Bahá’u’lláh." Based on this message, the Hands assumed temporary leadership of the global Bahá’í community until the formation of the Universal House of Justice, for a period of six years (from 1957 to 1963), and continued to fulfill their duties in advancing the Bahá’í Faith and carrying out the directives of Shoghi Effendi in his absence. The temporary administration of affairs by the Hands of the Cause until the formation of the Universal House of Justice is mentioned in the Kitáb-i-Aqdas.

Three interrelated factors resolved the crisis that the Bahá’í world faced with the sudden death of Shoghi Effendi (November 1957): 1.) From his statements, it was evident that he envisioned the conditions for the election of the Universal House of Justice to be ready after the successful completion of the Ten-Year Crusade. 2.) The Bahá’í community received its essential guidance from Shoghi Effendi's detailed plan, which included the particulars he had in mind. 3.) Finally, in one of his final messages to the Bahá’í world, Shoghi Effendi referred to the Hands of the Cause of God as the "Chief Stewards of the embryonic World Order of Bahá’u’lláh" and requested that they work closely with National Spiritual Assemblies of various countries to ensure the success of the plan and the preservation of unity within the Bahá’í Faith.

=== The First Gathering of the Hands (Baháʼí World Center, 1957) ===
After the sudden death of Shoghi Effendi in London, England, 26 of the 27 Hands of the Cause of God gathered in Haifa, Israel. When they opened his safe and desk, they found no will or document indicating a successor. On November 25, 1957, the Hands of the Cause sent a message to the Baháʼís of the world informing them of the situation.

Since the Baháʼí administrative institutions were well-established and the plan for the Faith's advancement was in place, the Hands who have been described by Shoghi Effendi as the "Chief Stewards of the embryonic World Order of Bahá’u’lláh", and based on the directives in the Will and Testament of Abdu'l-Baha, elected nine members from among themselves—through a confidential voting method—to temporarily oversee the affairs of the global Baháʼí community until the formation of the Universal House of Justice. This group, known as the "Custodians of the Bahá’í Faith residing in the Holy Land”, served as the highest authority in the Bahá’í world for six years until the election of the Universal House of Justice in 1963. The elected members of this group were: 1. Rúhíyyih Rabbani, 2. Mason Remey, 3. Amelia Collins, 4. Leroy Ioas, 5. ʻAlí-Akbar Furútan, 6. Jalál Kházeh, 7. Abu’l-Qásim Faizí, 8. Paul Haney, and 9. Hasan Balyuzi. All the Hands of the Cause signed the official statement confirming the absence of a successor to Shoghi Effendi and the creation of the nine-member body of the Custodians at the Bahá’í World Centre to manage the affairs of the Faith temporarily. The Custodians sent their first official letter to the National Spiritual Assemblies on December 2, 1957. Following this, all existing national and regional Bahá’í bodies across various continents recognized their authority. The Custodians made decisions by consultation among themselves and with other Hands of the Cause worldwide, using a voting system. In addition to their original duties, such as preserving the unity of the Faith and promoting the Bahá’í teachings, the Custodians assumed responsibilities left vacant by Shoghi Effendi. These included maintaining and developing Bahá’í properties and Holy Places at the World Centre in Israel, corresponding with national and regional Bahá’í bodies, guiding and collaborating with them, and completing the goals of the Ten Year Crusade. The number of members in the Custodians’ body was always nine. If any member died or could not serve for any reason at the Baháʼí World Center, another was chosen to replace them.

=== The Second Conclave (1958) ===
At the conclusion of the second conclave held in October 1958, the Hands of the Cause informed the Baháʼís of the world that the time had come for the election of the Universal House of Justice during the Ridván of 1963, marking the end of the Ten Year Crusade and coinciding with the centenary of the public declaration of Baháʼu’lláh's mission in Baghdad.

=== The Third Conclave of the Hands (1959) ===
During their third conclave held in 1959, the Hands of the Cause resolved that by the years 1961–1962, the number of National Spiritual Assemblies should increase to thirty-three to establish a broad and representative base of the global Baháʼí community in preparation for the forthcoming election of the Universal House of Justice. It was further announced that during Ridván of 1961, all existing national and regional spiritual assemblies would submit their ballots by mail to the Baháʼí World Centre to elect nine new members of the International Baháʼí Council. Eligibility for election was extended to all Baha’is aged 21 and up, excluding the Hands of the Cause themselves. This council thus elected functioned as a precursor to the Universal House of Justice, whose election was scheduled to occur two years later. During this interim period, the Council operated under the direction of the Hands of the Cause residing at the Baháʼí World Centre in Haifa, Israel. The election of the International Baháʼí Council in 1961 proceeded without interruption. During the brief period of Stewardship by the Hands of the Cause, the number of Baháʼí centers worldwide increased from nearly 4,100 to 11,000. The number of National Spiritual Assemblies grew from 26 to 56. They also completed Shoghi Effendi's plans for the construction of the Baháʼí Houses of Worship in Kampala (Uganda), Sydney (Australia), and Frankfurt (Germany). In the winter of 1961, the building of the International Archives, whose interior decorations had been completed under the supervision of the Hands of the Cause, was opened to pilgrims visiting the holy places at the Baháʼí World Centre.

Meanwhile, during the third conclave of the Hands, Mason Remey raised the issue of succession after Shoghi Effendi and the need for a new Guardian. None of the Hands accepted this suggestion as there existed no Will, document, or written statement from Shoghi Effendi appointing Remey as his successor. In fact, in 1957, Remey had joined the other Hands in signing an official statement affirming that Shoghi Effendi had left no appointed successor. Following the conclave, Remey withdrew into seclusion and, in 1961, proclaimed himself the second Guardian and successor to Shoghi Effendi, calling upon the Baháʼís of the world to follow him. As he persisted in his claim, in the same year, he was removed from his position as a Hand of the Cause and declared a Covenant-breaker. Remey managed to attract only a small number of followers, and, as he later admitted, the vast majority of the Baháʼí community rejected his claim.

The election and establishment of the Universal House of Justice in 1963 were met with widespread joy and celebration among the Baháʼís, and Remey and his supporters quickly lost any remaining influence in the Baháʼí world community.

== First Universal House of Justice (April–May 1963) ==
After the Ten-Year Crusade (1953–1963) ended, the Hands of the Cause then numbered 26, invited the members of the 56 National Spiritual Assemblies to convene in an International Baháʼí Convention to elect the nine members of the Universal House of Justice. The Hands of the Cause had declared themselves ineligible for membership in the House of Justice and requested the electors not to vote for them. Following the annual elections of these National Assemblies in their respective countries, about 300 delegates gathered in Haifa for the first International Baháʼí Convention and elected the members of the Universal House of Justice. After the election, the participants, the newly elected members of the Universal House of Justice, and other Baháʼís traveled to London to attend the centenary celebration of Baháʼu’lláh's public declaration of his mission in Baghdad in 1863. Around 7,000 Baháʼís from diverse racial and religious backgrounds participated in the celebration.

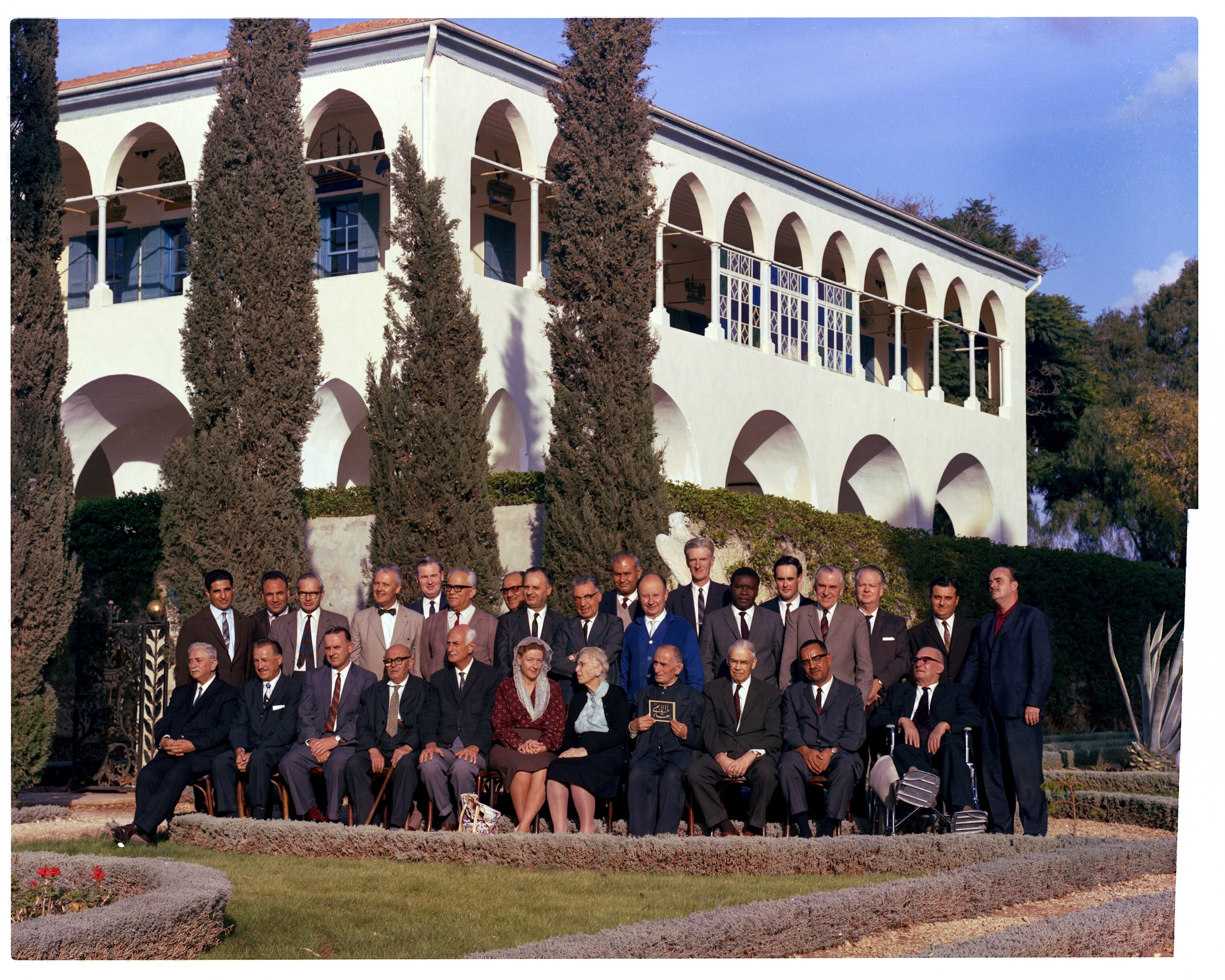
Members of the Universal House of Justice with Hands of the Cause in front of the Mansion of Bahjí, 1963.

With the election of the Universal House of Justice, the Stewardship of the Hands of the Cause ended. However, all the Hands, including the "9-member Custodians" in Haifa, continued to carry out their other appointed duties for the remainder of their lives. In its message to the Baháʼís of the world dated May 7, 1963, the Universal House of Justice, expressing deep gratitude, as previously conveyed at the first Baháʼí World Congress in London), recognized the Hands of the Cause as the Standard-bearers and experienced advisers of the new Nine-Year Plan.

== Custodians ==
During the period between the death of Shoghi Effendi and the election of the Universal House of Justice the Hands of the Cause held a convocation from which they constituted a body of nine from among their number to serve in the Holy Land and to act as Custodians of the Baháʼí Faith, a body which functioned without officers and with a quorum of five, whose duties included taking care of Baháʼí World Center properties and other assets; corresponding with and advising National and Regional Spiritual Assemblies; acting on behalf of the Baháʼí Faith for its protection; and maintaining close contact with the rest of the Hands, who would henceforth devote their time to the successful completion of the goals of the Ten Year Crusade. The Hands of the Cause maintained the number of Custodians, replacing those who died or were unable, for health or personal reasons, to remain at the Baháʼí World Center permanently.

The idea of a group of nine elected from among the Hands of the Cause to stay at the Baháʼí World Centre was referred to in the Will and Testament of ʻAbdu'l-Bahá, one of the defining documents of Baháʼí administration. This body of nine was given the duty to validate any appointments made as Guardian.

"The Hands of the Cause of God must elect from their own number nine persons that shall at all times be occupied in the important services in the work of the Guardian of the Cause of God. The election of these nine must be carried either unanimously or by majority from the company of the Hands of the Cause of God, and these, whether unanimously or by a majority vote, must give their assent to the choice of the one whom the Guardian of the Cause of God hath chosen as his successor."

=== Ministry of the Hands (1957–1963) ===
In 1957, after the unexpected death of Shoghi Effendi while he was traveling in Britain, the living Hands of the Cause gathered in Haifa and elected nine members who would retain the leadership of the religion until the Universal House of Justice was elected in 1963.

In a statement released by the complete body of the Hands of the Cause, they wrote:

We, the undersigned:
in our capacity as Hands of the Cause of God duly nominated and appointed by the Guardian of the Baháʼí Faith, His Eminence the late Shoghi Effendi Rabbani, assembled this 25 November 1957 at the Baháʼí World Centre and constituting the supreme body of the Baháʼí World Community

DO HEREBY UNANIMOUSLY RESOLVE AND PROCLAIM AS FOLLOWS:

WHEREAS THE Guardian of the Baháʼí Faith, His Eminence the late Shoghi Effendi Rabbani, died in London (England) on 4 November 1957, without having appointed his successor;

AND WHEREAS it is now fallen upon us as Chief Stewards of the Baháʼí World Faith to preserve the unity, the security and the development of the Baháʼí World Community and all its institutions;

AND WHEREAS in accordance with the Will and Testament of ʻAbdu'l-Bahá, the Hands of the Cause of God must elect from their own number, nine persons that shall at all times be occupied in the important services in the work of the Guardian of the Cause of God.";

We nominate and appoint from our own number to act on our behalf as the Custodians of the Baháʼí World Faith

Ruhiyyih Rabbani
Charles Mason Remey
Amelia E. Collins
Leroy C. Ioas
Hasan Balyuzi
ʻAlí-Akbar Furútan
Jalal Khazeh
Paul E. Haney
Adelbert Muhlschlegel

to exercise -- subject to such directions and decisions as may be given from time to time by us as the Chief Stewards of the Baháʼí World Faith -- all such functions, rights and powers in succession to the Guardian of the Baháʼí Faith, His Eminence the late Shoghi Effendi Rabbani, as are necessary to serve the interests of the Baháʼí World Faith, and this until such time as the Universal House of Justice, upon being duly established and elected in conformity with the Sacred Writings of Baháʼu'lláh and the Will and Testament of ʻAbdu'l-Bahá, may otherwise determine.

In 1959, Mason Remey and Hasan Balyuzi found that they could no longer serve in a permanent capacity as Custodian of the Faith at the Baháʼí World Centre, and thus John Ferraby and Horace Holley were selected to replace them as Custodians. Then, in 1960, after the death of Horace Holley, William Sears was elected to replace him and serve as a Custodian.

=== Closing of their office ===
The Custodians called for the election of the Universal House of Justice at the close of the Ten-Year Crusade in 1963, they excluded themselves from being elected to that institution.

Upon the election of the Universal House of Justice, the Custodians closed their office and turned to that newly elected body. They announced:

"WE, THE UNDERSIGNED, DULY NOMINATED AND APPOINTED AS CUSTODIANS OF THE BAHAʼI WORLD FAITH BY THE DECLARATION OF THE HANDS OF THE CAUSE OF GOD MADE AT BAHJI ON NOVEMBER 25TH, 1957... do now declare that the Universal House of Justice was so established and elected by action of the International Baháʼí Convention held at Haifa on April 21st, 22nd and 23rd, 1963 and we hereby release all the said functions, rights and powers which were conferred upon us under the said Declaration of November 25th, 1957 as determined by the Universal House of Justice in its communication of June 7th, 1963, and we declare that all the said functions, rights and powers now devolve rightfully and in full accordance with the Sacred Writings of the Baháʼí Faith upon the Universal House of Justice. We make this statement for the full body of the Hands of the Cause of God in accordance with the powers conferred upon us by the Declaration of November 25th, 1957, and the office of Custodians of the Baháʼí World Faith has thus ceased to exist."

== Continuity of functions ==
In November 1964, the Universal House of Justice announced that the appointment of new Hands of the Cause or the enactment of laws for such appointments did not fall within its authority. However, it was possible to establish institutions in the future to carry out the responsibilities previously assigned to the Hands, especially in the areas of proclaiming the Baháʼí Faith and preserving its unity. In this direction, and to ensure the continued fulfillment of these responsibilities, the Universal House of Justice gradually established two new institutions: the Continental Boards of Counsellors and the International Teaching Centre.

In a message issued in 1976–77, the Universal House of Justice clarified the continued roles of the Hands of the Cause for the Baháʼí community. It stated that because of the important responsibilities entrusted to the Hands of the Cause by Shoghi Effendi, the Universal House of Justice had deemed it inappropriate for the Hands to be appointed or elected to serve in Baháʼí administrative institutions. Freed from administrative duties, the Hands of the Cause were thus able to devote more of their time to encouraging, inspiring, nurturing, and educating the global Baháʼí community.

=== Continental Boards of Counsellors ===
The Institution of the Counsellors was appointed and established by the Universal House of Justice in 1968. It was created to continue the functions carried out by the Hands of the Cause, and began overseeing the Auxiliary Boards at the continental or subcontinental level. By 1985, five Continental Boards, with a total of 72 Continental Counsellors were serving, and the number of Auxiliary Board members had reached 622. Every five years, the Universal House of Justice appoints 81 Counsellors from around the world, who serve on five Continental Boards. These Counsellors, in turn, appoint members of the Auxiliary Boards to serve in specific geographical areas within each continent. The Counsellors, together with the Auxiliary Board members and their assistants, work to stimulate the growth and vitality of the Baháʼí community and to enhance its spiritual, intellectual, and social life Continental Counsellors are not eligible for elected offices in the Baháʼí communities, except for membership in the Universal House of Justice itself, which is determined by election from among the Baháʼís of the world. If elected to the House of Justice, they cease to serve on the Board of Counsellors.

=== Duties of the Institution of the Counsellors ===
To continue the functions and responsibilities of the Hands of the Cause, the general duties of this institution include promoting the teachings of the Baháʼí Faith and preserving the unity of the Baháʼí community. Members of this institution possess no legislative, executive, or judicial authority. Its members encourage action, promote individual initiatives, and enhance learning within the Baháʼí communities, plus offer guidance to the Spiritual Assemblies. This Institution has a vital role to play in advancing the interests of the Baháʼí Faith and influencing the life of the Baháʼí communities, from the grassroots to the international level. The focus of its members is to empower the Baháʼí community to plan systematic programs of growth, vigorously implementing them, and learn from their experiences in the path of building that global civilization envisioned by Baháʼu’lláh. The Counsellors function to strengthen love of service and understanding of the faith in the hearts of the members of the Baháʼí community, try to reinforce bonds of friendship and unity, promote the moral principles and standards contained in the Baháʼí teachings, and broaden the vision of the community members so that individuals may dedicate their capacities and energies to the welfare of humankind.

=== International Teaching Centre (ITC) ===
In 1973, a few years after the establishment of the Continental Boards of Counsellors, the Universal House of Justice established the International Teaching Centre (ITC) at the Baháʼí World Centre in Haifa, by appointing seven Counsellors for five years, and added the permanent membership of all the Hands of the Cause to it. In this capacity, the Hands of the Cause, in addition to holding their own special meetings, also participated both individually and collectively in joint consultation sessions with the Universal House of Justice.

The Universal House of Justice has described the creation of the ITC as the result of the services of the Hands of the Cause residing at the Baháʼí World Centre. International Teaching Center is a channel of communication between the Universal House of Justice and the Continental Counsellors, guiding and assisting them in the preparation of teaching plans for the dissemination of the Baháʼí principles.

The nature of the operation of the International Teaching Centre is fundamentally collective in that it maintains a comprehensive awareness of the progress of the Baháʼí community across the globe. It is constantly attentive to the areas of growth, the strengthening of institutions, and the advancement of collective endeavors of the Baháʼí community. As a result, the International Teaching Centre places special emphasis on the development of human resources and helps the Baháʼí community worldwide to enhance its capacity to offer access to spiritual insights, knowledge, skills, and the abilities to increasing numbers of people needed for effective service to society at large.

The ITC functions in Haifa with nine members who are appointed by the Universal House of Justice immediately following the Baháʼí International Convention, for a term of five years.

In the Baháʼí administrative order, legislative, executive, and judicial authority are entrusted to elected bodies. However, these elected bodies are not deprived of the wisdom and experience of the appointed Counsellors in their interaction between the activities of the Spiritual Assemblies and the Counsellors. The Baháʼí administrative order affirms that the Counsellors and their assistants, in addition to promoting adherence to Baháʼí principles among individuals, institutions, and communities, possess a special capacity to guide and support the Spiritual Assemblies in their actions.

== See also ==
- Apostles of Baháʼu'lláh
- Disciples of ʻAbdu'l-Bahá
- Institution of the Counsellors
- Letters of the Living
