= Baháʼí Faith in the United States =

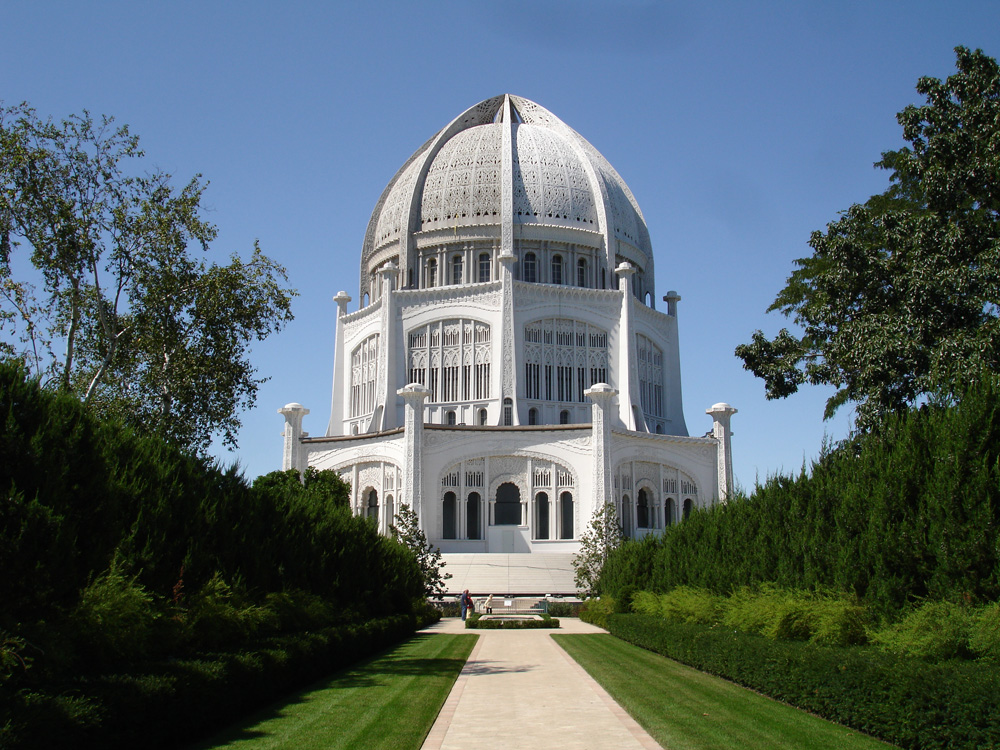
Baháʼí House of Worship, Wilmette, Illinois

The Baháʼí Faith was first mentioned in the United States in 1893 at the World Parliament of Religions in Chicago. Soon after, early American converts began embracing the new religion. Thornton Chase was the most prominent among the first American Baha'is and made important contributions to early activities. One of the first Baháʼí institutions in the U.S. was established in Chicago and called the Baháʼí Temple Unity, incorporated in 1909 to facilitate the establishment of the first Baháʼí House of Worship in the West, which was eventually built in Wilmette, Illinois and dedicated in 1953. As of 2020 the Association of Statisticians of American Religious Bodies noted the Baháʼí Faith was the largest non-Christian religion in the majority of US counties.

ʻAbdu'l-Bahá became head of the Baháʼí Faith after his father Baha'u'llah (Founder of the religion) died in 1892. He visited the United States and Canada in 1912, ultimately reaching some 40 cities from April to December. He promoted his father's teachings on peace and unity and consolidated the fledgling western Baháʼí community. After returning from his journey, ʻAbdu'l-Bahá continued corresponding with American Baháʼís, eventually addressing to them a series of letters, or tablets, charging the believers with the task of spreading the religion worldwide. These letters were compiled in Tablets of the Divine Plan.

Following ʻAbdu'l-Bahá's death in 1921, his grandson Shoghi Effendi became the Guardian of the Faith, and continued to encourage and direct the efforts of the American and worldwide Baháʼí community. In 1925, the first National Spiritual Assembly of the United States was formed in conjunction with the Baháʼís of Canada. In 1937, Shoghi Effendi asked believers to begin the systematic implementation of ʻAbdu'l-Bahá's vision of teaching the Faith worldwide, calling for American pioneers to assist in establishing Baháʼí communities in the republics of Latin America. Later coordinated efforts, such as the Ten Year Crusade from 1953–63, would see American pioneers sent to a wide variety of locations around the globe.

At the conclusion of the first 7-year Plan in 1944, it was reported that every state in the United States had at least one Local Spiritual Assembly, and the national Baháʼí population was estimated at 4,800. In its 2020 annual report, the National Spiritual Assembly of the 48 contiguous states reported 177,647 registered Baháʼís of all ages, only 77,290 of which had good addresses, and 57,341 total participants in core activities, with 37% of attendees from outside of the Baháʼí population.

== Early history ==
The first mention of events related to the history of the religion in the United States appears to be the 1845-6 echo of the Nov 1845 London Times story relating events of the Báb upon return from pilgrimage, whom Baháʼís hold as a direct precursor akin to the relationship between John the Baptist and Jesus. In America this was printed in April 1846 in the Boon Lick Times based on an article in the NY Mirror. A mention in 1850 followed. The first academic paper on the religion was a letter written to the American Oriental Society which was holding its meeting in Boston and the library of materials was held at the Boston Athenæum. The letter was originally published as part of the minutes of the Society in The Literary World of June 14, 1851, as an untitled entry whose first quote is "notice of a singular character, who has for some years past played a prominent part on the stage of Persian life" dated February 10, 1851 by Dr. Rev. Austin H. Wright. It was subsequently also published in a Vermont newspaper June 26, 1851. In 1893 Rev. Henry Harris Jessup addressed the World Parliament of Religions in Chicago with the first mention the Baháʼí Faith itself in the United States - and published in the Chicago Inter Ocean and manuscript. Anton Haddad, the first Baháʼí to come to America was already in the country.

=== First community ===
Following Haddad, Ibrahim George Kheiralla came to the US and settled in New York where he began to teach "Truth Seeker" classes. He visited Charles Augustus Briggs and others, as well as the Syrian community in New York however in 1894 Kheiralla moved on to Chicago following the interest fostered by the World's Columbian Exposition's World Parliament of Religions. One of the early converts while Kheiralla was in Chicago was Thornton Chase, who had read the presentation about the Baháʼís at the Exposition, and is generally considered the first Baháʼí convert in the West. Other individuals had converted, but none remained members of the religion. Later students of Kheiralla's included Howard MacNutt, who would later compile The Promulgation of Universal Peace, a prominent collection of the addresses of ʻAbdu'l-Bahá during his journeys in America. Both men were designated as "Disciples of ʻAbdu'l-Bahá" and "Heralds of the Covenant" by Shoghi Effendi. Another student of the classes and Disciple was Lua Getsinger, designated as the "mother teacher of the West". Another who "passed" the class and joined the religion was the maverick Honoré Jackson. Kheiralla moved once again, to Kenosha, Wisconsin, in 1895, where a large Baháʼí community soon developed.

In 1898, Kheiralla undertook a Baháʼí pilgrimage to Palestine to meet ʻAbdu'l-Bahá with other American pilgrims, including Phoebe Hearst, Lua Getsinger and joined by May Bolles. Kheiralla began making claims of independent leadership and ʻAbdu'l-Bahá sent, first, Anton Haddad with a letter contesting the definition of leadership, then Khieralla's initial teacher of the religion, ʻAbdu'l-Karím-i-Tihrání, to confront him. The conflict made the newspapers. Ultimately unwilling to follow the leadership of ʻAbdu'l-Bahá, he was declared a Covenant-breaker.

In the earliest decades of the religion in the country the US the membership had rapid fluctuations that suffered from ill defined community experiences of what membership even meant. It had started with writing individual letters of declaration to 'Abdu'l-Baha but that became less common after 1900.

=== Green Acre ===
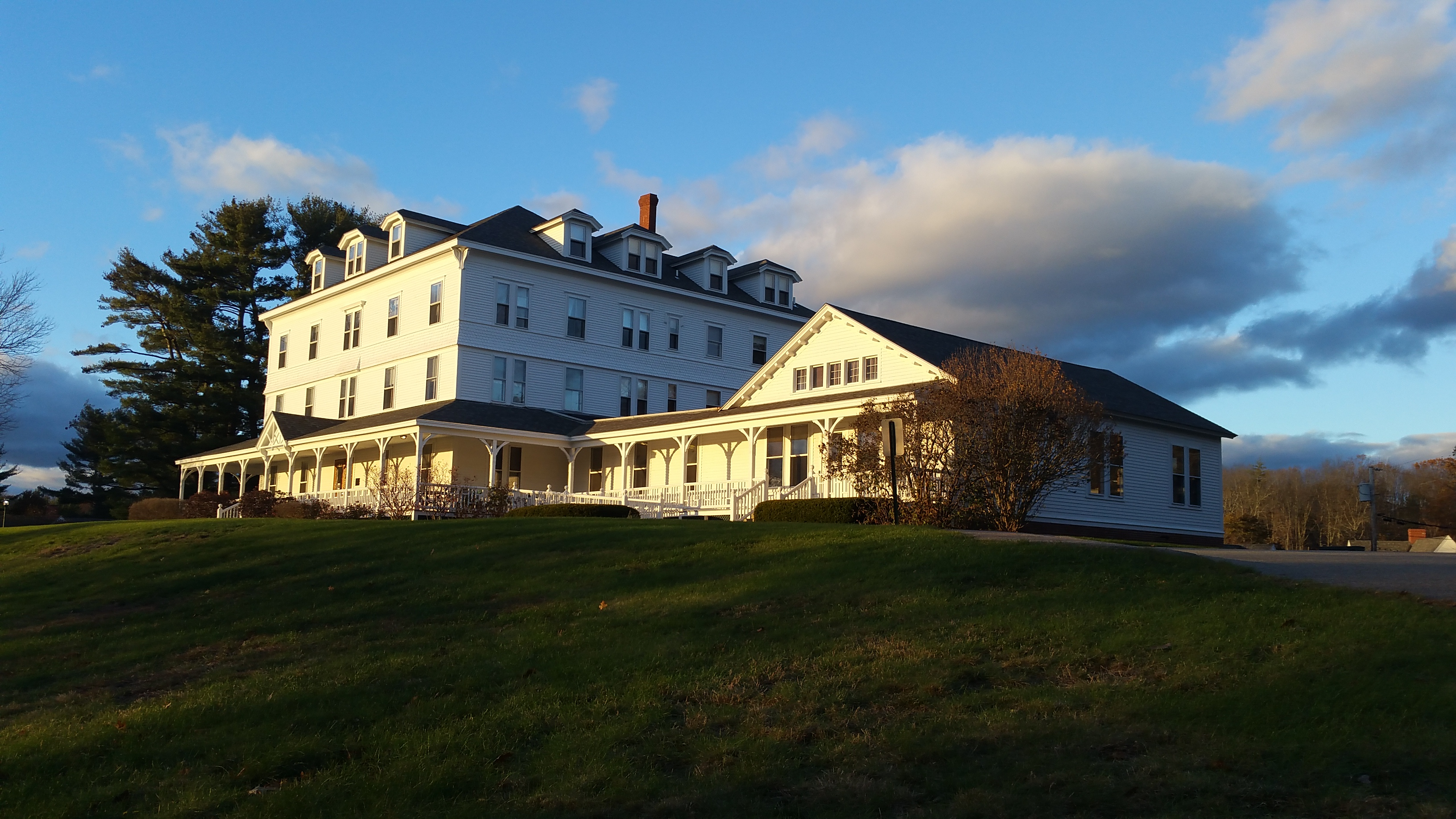
The Inn at Green Acre, in Eliot, Maine

Meanwhile, to the east, Sarah Farmer had founded Green Acre following the enthusiasm of the same Parliament as a summer center of cross-religion gatherings and cultural development. She had success attracting investors, most especially Phoebe Hearst, but by the end of 1899 things were in crisis. According to scholar Eric Leigh Schmidt various people involved were trying to take Green Acre in various directions and threatened the shutdown of the programs Creditors were nervous, and her business partners had thought to force Farmer to sell out. While her partners were seeking to meet with her, Farmer was a guest already aboard the SS Fürst Bismarck the first week of January 1900. During the voyage Farmer and Wilson met friends and learned they were on the way to see ʻAbdu'l-Bahá and were asked to come along. Wilson was dubious but eventually the ladies changed their plans and went along. before leaving for Haifa March 23, 1900. After converting to the religion on meeting ʻAbdu'l-Bahá Farmer returned to America and began settings plans for the 1901 session at Green Acre. Mírzá Abu'l-Faḍl, among the most scholarly trained Baháʼís of the time, accompanied Anton Haddad returning to America and arrived for the 1901 season. Ali Kuli Khan, to serve as his translator, arrived in the United States in June. They had been sent by ʻAbdu'l-Bahá. The later well-known Baháʼí Agnes Baldwin Alexander (in 1957, the head of the Baháʼí Faith, Shoghi Effendi, appointed her a Hand of the Cause of God, the highest rank one may hold as an individual Baháʼí), was also there. Out of this the community of Baháʼís began to form in Boston. Farmer and ʻAbdu'l-Bahá began an active exchange of letters some twenty-plus of his which were gathered and printed initially in 1909 and then the third edition in 1919.

=== Continued development ===
That America went through a Civil War and achieved progress toward an emancipation of its black people is pointed at by ʻAbdu'l-Bahá in 1912 as a basis of encouraging respect for America in its support for humanitarian and altruistic ideals. An appeal to the US for humanitarian interest goes as far back as 1867 when Baháʼís wrote a petition to the US Congress because it held no attachment to the present oppressive conditions in Persia. Baháʼu'lláh did himself address the "Rulers of America and the Presidents of the Republics" (Ulysses S. Grant was USA President at the time) saying in part "Bind ye the broken with the hands of justice, and crush the oppressor who flourisheth with the rod of the commandments of your Lord…." Baháʼís also used diplomatic means to seek redress or relief. In 1901 when the American Baha'i community numbered only roughly 2000 members, they approached the US Ambassador to Persia Herbert W. Bowen in Paris concerning the situation of Baháʼís. As an example of the persecution Baha'is faced (then and now) in Iran, even an American diplomat was murdered in 1924 by a mob on suspicion of being a Baháʼí intervening in a local matter.

In 1906 a government census reported through a scholar that there were 1280 Baháʼís in 24 places among 14 states. Early Baháʼís in this period included reformers and artists like Stanwood Cobb, Louis G. Gregory, and Juliet Thompson. Laura Clifford Barney interviewed ʻAbdu'l-Bahá on several teachings of the religion resulting in the early publication Some Answered Questions. The Baháʼí Temple Unity was incorporated in Chicago at a national convention in 1909 to facilitate the establishment of the first Baháʼí House of Worship in the West; 39 delegates from 36 cities attended. Star of the West was the first large periodical production in the country beginning in March, 1910. Thornton Chase scholar Robert Stockman underscores Chase' importance as an early North American Baháʼí thinker, publicist, administrator, and organizer who is still under appreciated, that "He is perhaps the only person (in America) before 1912 who had a thorough understanding of the Baháʼí concept of consultation." Chase was the prime mover behind many of the Chicago's early institutional activities and in many ways his sudden death left a gap in the North American Baháʼí community that remained unfilled until the rise to prominence in the early 1920s of Horace Holley, the chief developer of Baháʼí organization in the United States and Canada.

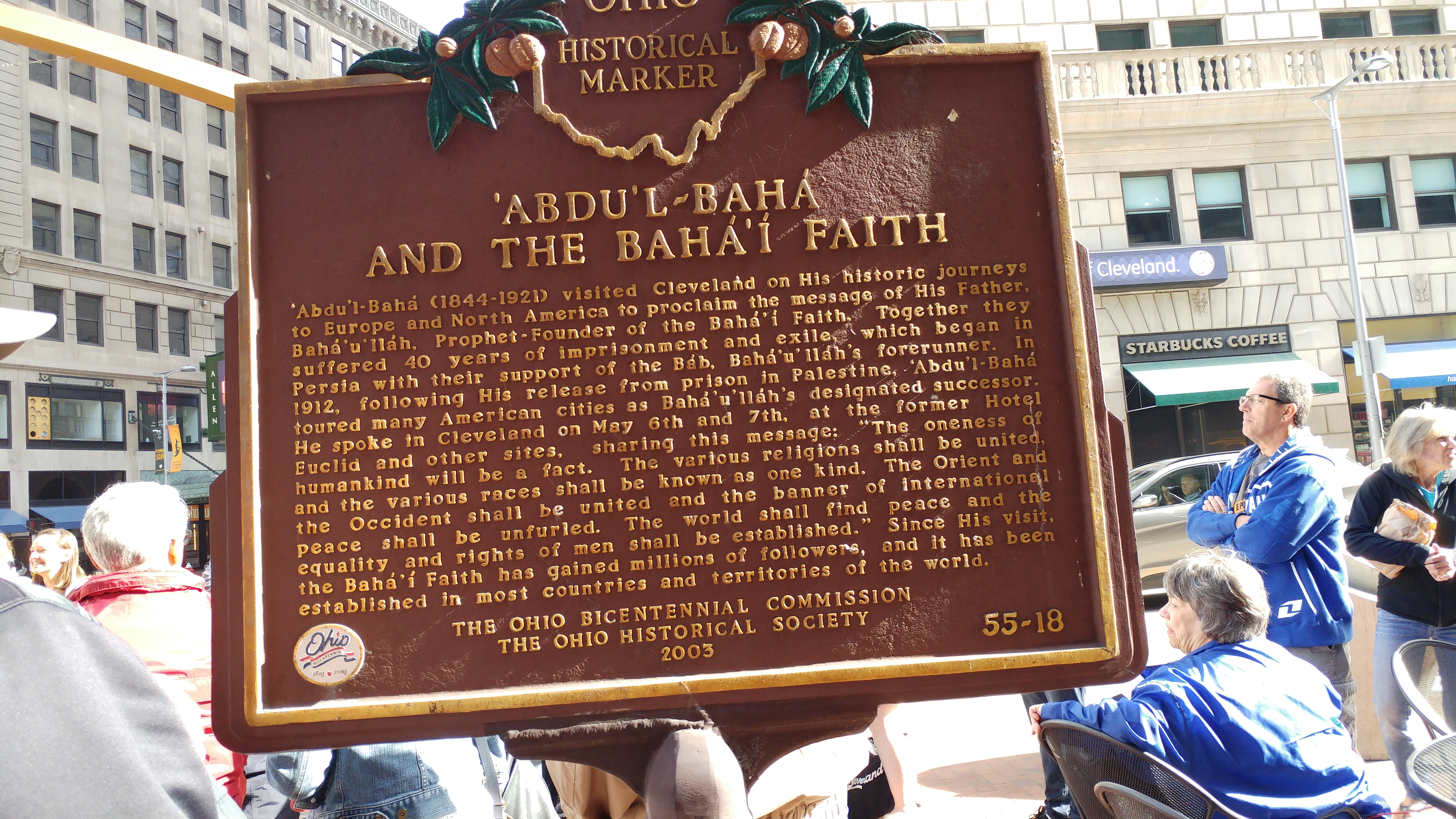
Plaque commemorating ʻAbdu'l-Bahá's visit to Cleveland in 1912.

ʻAbdu'l-Bahá, while head of the religion, visited the United States and Canada, ultimately visiting some 40 cities, to once again spread his father's teachings. He arrived in New York City on 11 April 1912. While he spent most of his time in New York, he visited many cities on the east coast. Then in August he started a more extensive journey across America to the West coast before returning east at the end of October. On 5 December 1912 he set sail back to Europe from New York. During his nine months in North America, he met with many well known people as well as hundreds of American and Canadian Baháʼís who were recent converts to the religion. Accomplishments during the trip include setting examples of the core values of the religion - unity of humanity, and gender equality. First he demonstrated an advanced race-consciousness by glorifying diversity and black individuals on multiple occasions when racial segregation in the United States was the usual practice. And second, extending the progress of the equality of women and men. During his stay in America the lead all-male assembly was dissolved in favor of an integrated one of women and men.

After his return to Palestine in 1913, ʻAbdu'l-Bahá mentioned various lands around the world in which the religion should be introduced, predicted the imminence of World War I, and elaborated the qualities of those who seek to serve the religion. This guidance took the form of a series of letters, or tablets, to the followers of the religion in the United States in 1916-1917; these letters were compiled together in the book Tablets of the Divine Plan. They were translated and presented on April 4, 1919 in New York City, and published in Star of the West on December 12, 1919. Urbain Ledoux also joined the religion about this time. The world-wide activity of Martha Root, who circled the globe three times teaching the Faith, was catalyzed by these Tablets.

The American Baháʼí community went through a shift in the 1910s from a loosely defined community centered on ʻAbdu'l-Bahá's charismatic personality, toward doctrinal uniformity and an emphasis on the Covenant. Confusions on membership existed though larger communities became more stable. For example, following the 1917 national convention, Mason Remey chaired an investigative committee into a study group in Chicago that was mixing the teachings of Baháʼu'lláh with an occult leader, while communications with 'Abdu'l-Baha were cut off. The group members were declared "violators" and expelled from the community, and these decisions were confirmed at the national convention of 1918. Nevertheless William Garlington suggests this shift may be why official roles went from around 3,000 in 1916 to half that in 1926.

ʻAbdu'l-Bahá died in November 1921. In his will he appointed his grandson Shoghi Effendi as the Guardian and leader of the religion. A few in America questioned the appointment as early as 1926. Another division occurred because many were attracted to the personality of ʻAbdu'l-Bahá and saw the religion as an ecumenical society to which all persons of goodwill—regardless of religion—might join. When Shoghi Effendi made clear the position that the Baháʼí Faith was an independent religion with its own distinct administration through local and national spiritual assemblies, a few felt that he had overstepped the bounds of his authority; some who actively and continuously caused disunity were expelled by Shoghi Effendi as Covenant-breakers. All of the divisions in this period were short-lived and restricted in their influence, for the most part failing to last beyond the lives of their initial dissidents.

== 1921–1963 ==
While the first Baháʼí House of Worship of the Americas began taking form in Chicago, national institutional development of the religion shifted to Green Acre for some decades. The Star of the West was replaced with the Baháʼí News in 1924 and supplemented by the magazine World Order in 1935. The first National Spiritual Assembly was elected in 1925 after years of increasing organizational development. See Statistics on National Spiritual Assemblies. Individuals in a number of social situations joined the religion - Alain LeRoy Locke, James Ferdinand Morton Jr., Robert Sengstacke Abbott, Helen Elsie Austin, and Nancy Douglas Bowditch. Additionally, two more institutions were established like Green Acre: the Geyserville school that later moved to become the Bosch Baháʼí School and the Louhelen Baháʼí School.

Gradually from the early 1920s, with the leadership of Shoghi Effendi, membership in the religion was further delineated and its institutions more specifically defined both in methods of election and in jurisdiction. On the one hand it defined local assemblies as nine people elected by people who had formally declared their affiliation and distinct from membership in churches and that the boundaries of jurisdiction were the civil boundaries of the city or town, with jurisdiction at the regional and national level beyond that of local assemblies assigned more clearly to the national organs which were more firm by 1940. In the 1930s Shoghi Effendi also increased the standardization of avoiding political party affiliations which were progressively applied. And since the 1900s and on beyond the 1940s minorities grew in the community - African Americans grew from single digit percentages to the teens, over-represented compared to the states Bahá'ís were present in at the time and rose to higher percentages across the decades, and were integrated into communities successively with an increasing national normative process that may have had an increased sense of hierarchical loyalty instead of community bonds. Though just a member of the community, the young Helen Clevenger was murdered in July 1936 and made international headlines in newspapers, and her story was republished in true crime magazines and retold in radio dramas into 1937, sometimes referencing her status as a Bahá'í, though academic review finds "…the irony of the case lay in Clevenger membership in the Bahai’i(sic) Faith [who…] were strikingly at odds with most other mainstream religions in their resolute affirmation of human equality. The faith established roots early among African Americans in Washington, D.C. and spread to both blacks and whites in other cities as well. In 1921, the religion’s head, ‘Abdu’l-Baha, asked the various congregations … to begin holding “Race Amity” meetings, where members could openly discuss race and racism. That this occurred in the context of President Woodrow Wilson resegregating the capital city and the resurgence of the Ku Klux Klan outside of the former Confederate south is astonishing".

=== Bahá'í Historical Record Survey ===
The Bahá'í Historical Record Survey was an early demographic review of the Bahá'í Faith in the United States and Canada done circa 1934-1936. The backgrounds of Bahá'ís were later studied in a number of ways - racial and ethnic heritage, previous religious background, geographical spread and sometimes how these have changed over the years. Complimentary data sources have also been used to add to some of the reviews including US Census publications and Bahá'í directories published in periodicals of Bahá'í literature.

A couple of these studies look specifically at the burgeoning black population of Bahá'ís amidst the wider society practice of continuing era of social segregation in the American society of the time which was against the Bahá'í teaching of the unity of all humanity. The vast majority of the Bahá'ís were white and mostly elder women, but the black segment of those states Bahá'ís were in responded more to the religion than the white population of those states did. The religion was also initially attracting Protestants, especially Unitarian Universalists and also among other more mainstream liberal denominations, but as history approached 1936 and beyond it attracted a greater diversity of religious backgrounds as it continued to grow more by conversion than by migration or birth.

=== First Seven Year Plan ===
Shoghi Effendi, head of the religion after the death of ʻAbdu'l-Bahá, wrote a cable on May 1, 1936 to the Baháʼí Annual Convention of the United States and Canada, and asked for the systematic implementation of ʻAbdu'l-Bahá's vision to begin. In his cable he wrote:

Appeal to assembled delegates ponder historic appeal voiced by ʻAbdu'l-Bahá in Tablets of the Divine Plan. Urge earnest deliberation with incoming National Assembly to insure its complete fulfillment. First century of Baháʼí Era drawing to a close. Humanity entering outer fringes most perilous stage its existence. Opportunities of present hour unimaginably precious. Would to God every State within American Republic and every Republic in American continent might ere termination of this glorious century embrace the light of the Faith of Baháʼu'lláh and establish structural basis of His World Order.

Following the May 1 cable, another cable from Shoghi Effendi came on May 19 calling for permanent pioneers to be established in all the countries of South American and the Caribbean. The 1936 religious census conducted by the United States government reported 2,584 Baháʼís and by 1944 every state in the nation had at least one local Baháʼí administrative body called a Spiritual Assembly, and a population of about 4,800 Baháʼís was reported. During that period the Baháʼí National Spiritual Assembly of the United States and Canada appointed the Inter-America Committee to take charge of the preparations for international pioneers. In the fall, amidst the rebuilding of the economy in the Great Depression and the build up to World War II a special collection and printing of the scriptural guidance to America was given to President Franklin Roosevelt, "that these utterances may, in this hour of grave crisis, bring to him comfort, encouragement and strength." During the 1937 Baháʼí North American Convention, Shoghi Effendi cabled advising the convention to prolong their deliberations to permit the delegates and the National Assembly to consult on a plan that would enable Baháʼís to go to Latin America as well as to include the completion of the outer structure of the Baháʼí House of Worship in Wilmette, Illinois. In 1937 the First Seven Year Plan (1937–44), an international plan designed by Shoghi Effendi, gave the American Baháʼís the goal of establishing the Baháʼí Faith in every country in Latin America. In 1937 there was essentially no presence of the religion from Central America south, and eleven states and provinces in the US and Canada had no Baháʼís at all; thirty‑four lacked spiritual assemblies. In 1938 Baháʼí communities and Local Spiritual Assemblies began to form across Latin America with the spread of American Baháʼís, while inside the United States individuals like Guy Murchie, Robert Hayden, Robert B. Powers, joined the religion and others who were raised in the religion achieved increasing levels of service in it like Marion Holley and Dorothy Beecher Baker or otherwise became more well known in the world like Bernard Leach, Carole Lombard, Barbara Hale, Lois Hall and William Sears. In April 1953 the Baháʼí House of Worship (Wilmette, Illinois) was formally dedicated.

During through shortly after WWII the community roughly quadrupled even while the average size of communities dropped from 30 to 15 and 15 became the idealized as able to support various activities like regular Feasts, Holy Day observances, public meetings, assembly meetings. At the same time activities that used to be run by individuals on their own initiative became functions of appointed committees.

Up to 1944, delegates to the national convention were selected based on local assemblies - in 1944 they were elected on the basis of statewide regional conventions of Baháʼís. In 1947, at a time when the Baháʼís number approaching 5000 in America, Baháʼí students at the University of Chicago participated in a demonstration against the segregation and discrimination based on race for medical treatment of students on campus. In 1955 American Baháʼís and institutions spoke up following the destruction of a Baháʼí center of worship in Iran.

From the latter 1940s into the early 1960s the population of Bahá'ís doubled every thirteen years even while the community was sending out pioneers to South America and Europe across the 1930s and 40s.

In 1941, National Spiritual Assembly of the Bahá'ís of the United States and Canada(NSA) filed a suit in the Supreme court of New York County against Mirza Ahmad Sohrab to stop him from using the name "Bahá'í". The judge dismissed the case, stating that, the complaint fails to state a good cause of action. The NSA appealed but the Appellate Court affirmed the decision of the lower court.

Since the 1900s and on beyond the 1940s minorities grew in the community - African Americans grew from single digit percentages to the teens, over-represented compared to the states Bahá'ís were present in at the time, rose to higher percentages across the decades, and were integrated into communities successively with an increasing national normative process that may have had an increased sense of hierarchical loyalty instead of community bonds.

=== Later developments ===
Later coordinated efforts, such as the Ten Year Crusade, would see large scale changes in the country - first pioneers were sent to a wide variety of locations around the globe, such as Africa, some parts of eastern Asia, parts of Oceania/Polynesia filling out the list of first Baháʼís to settle in a country for the plan in a terminology of the Knights of Baháʼu'lláh. In addition to the international consequences to the plan, initiatives were also started in other arenas. The United States Bahá'ís also had 'subordinate objectives' during the Crusade. One included raising of the total number of Local Spiritual Assemblies to three hundred. This message to the Bahá'í community at the national convention was conveyed by Rúhíyyih Khánum. The principles for the list of goal cities developed was later explained in the national Baha'i News periodical. The National Assembly followed these principles:

- If a state had only one assembly, at least one other town was on the list with priority to preserving that one assembly.
- Any goal with no Bahá'í presence was called a 'virgin goal' and otherwise was a 'consolidation goal'. 40 virgin goals were compiled.
- If a state had a cluster of assemblies in one area goals was picked in outlying areas of that cluster to "reduce the immense distances between many Bahá'í communities."
- 133 goal cities were developed where groups of at least 4 Bahá'ís lived.
- Some goals were developed "within easy travel" of established communities so that people who could afford only moving narrowly could do so.
- If a community that was not a goal area were to rise to assembly status they would be counted towards the total and that individuals were free to pioneer anywhere but should not expect other pioneers to be coordinated to join them just because they were there.

The Bahá'í directory for 1953-1954 listed 171 local assemblies, 600 locales with groups of 2-8 adult Bahá'ís, and 611 locations with isolated individual Bahá'ís. The first national list of goal cities was published in the Baha'i News in October, 1953. By 1963 there were 331 total assemblies, 649 locations with groups of 2-8 adult Bahá'ís, short of electing an assembly, and 676 locations of isolated Bahá'ís. Before being officially tasked with the work to support the goal some Area Teaching Committees already existed and were in a degree of organization with their own newsletters and conferences by September, 1953. These institutions had existed at least as far back as 1949, sometimes called Regional Teaching Committees. The fact that the Area Teaching Committees were designated central to the achievement of the goal was detailed again in June, 1955.

The US sent about 400 pioneers across the plan to the international goals, almost half of whom were women. This was out of a population in the United States of almost 7,000 by 1956 and by 1963 the membership exceeded 10,000, and were increasing by about 1,200 per year. Though there had occasionally been earlier contact with Native American populations, (see for example the story of Nipo T. Strongheart,) this kind of effort was also a point of action during the plan.

As a result of international and intranational changes, eras of activity and waves of growth, the cultural norms in the Baháʼí Faith went through major transitions. The first occurred at about the turn of the 20th century when the religion became known beyond its mainly Muslim Middle-Eastern population and spread to Christian North America and Europe. The second major breakthrough started post-World War II when the religion began to spread rapidly in the villages of the Third World. A stated purpose for the coordinating committees appointed to oversee the process was to facilitate a shift in the balance of roles from North American leading guidance and Latin cooperation to Latin leading guidance and North American cooperation. The process was well underway by 1950 and was to be enforced about 1953. In Africa it was emphasized that western pioneers be self-effacing and focus their efforts not on the colonial leadership but on the native Africans - and that the pioneers must show by actions the sincerity of their sense of service to the Africans in bringing the religion and then the Africans who understand their new religion are to be given freedom to rise up and spread the religion according to their own sensibilities and the pioneers to disperse or step into the background. Similar practices were undertake by Australians arriving in Papua New Guinea. Unlike the spread of Christianity within Indian country in the United States, the Baháʼí Faith has never been associated with a fortification of colonial occupation, Euro-American assimilation, or forced conversions of Native Americans. Indeed in 1960 Hand of the Cause Rúhíyyih Khánum asked for forgiveness for the injustices her race had done and praised the great past of the Native Americans. And in 1963 anthropologist Alice Beck Kehoe, a well known researcher of Native Americans, observed that "[The Baháʼí Faith] does not deny the validity of native Indian beliefs, [and]...appeals to many Indians who are seeking a religion that is neither exclusively Indian nor dominated by white values and customs," though while the religion was growing the challenge of broadening respect also continued to be a point of engagement.

=== Mason Remey's schism ===
In 1957 the Baháʼí world came upon a crisis when Shoghi Effendi died without having appointed a successor. The appointed Hands of the Cause organized a way to fill the central leadership until a decision could be made by the Universal House of Justice, which was elected in 1963 and ruled that under the conditions that prevailed, no second Guardian could have been appointed. Prior to the election of the Universal House of Justice, in 1960 one of the Hands, Mason Remey, announced that he was the Guardian and expected the allegiance of the world's Baháʼís. Remey was a prominent member of the American Baháʼí community, having been a contemporary of ʻAbdu'l-Bahá and appointed president of the International Baháʼí Council. His claim was rejected by the Hands of the Cause, and nearly all Baháʼís regarded him as a Covenant-breaker. Remey's division failed to attract sizable following. In 1964 there was a lawsuit and the NSA and won trademark rights. This group splintered and dwindled below 100 members by 2010, with no communal religious life.

=== Involvement in Morocco ===
In the midst of the period leading directly to the election Baháʼís in Morocco had organized their first assembly and begun to suffer persecution. In 1963 the arrest of Baháʼís in Morocco had gotten attention from King Hassan II of Morocco, US Senator Kenneth B. Keating and Roger Nash Baldwin, then Chairman of the International League for the Rights of Man. On March 31, 1963 during a visit to the United States and the United Nations, King Hasan was interviewed on television on Meet the Press, then with Lawrence E. Spivak, and was asked about the treatment of Baháʼís in his own country. He addressed the audience saying that the Baháʼí Faith was not a religion and "against good order and also morals". However, on April 2 he makes a public statement that if the Supreme Court confirms the penalty of death that he would grant them a royal pardon. However, on November 23 the Supreme Court heard the appeals and reversed the decision of the lower court. On December 13 the prisoners were actually released.

== Since 1963 ==
In 1964 a project developed among the Baháʼís supporting race unity - the same period as the Freedom Summer campaign - with connections at Louhelen and the burgeoning Baháʼí community of Greenville South Carolina. School integration was going to happen that Fall. Training sessions for a project were noted in the Baháʼí News in August at Louhelen. Some 80 youth attended the training in mid-June and some 26 faculty and staff. After the classes in various subjects 27 went to 8 locations: Greenville, SC, Atlanta, GA, locations in MN, NM, AZ, MI and DC. Six youth went to Greenville, SC, under the sponsorship of their local assembly for a 6 week program joined by five local youth. They worked on tutoring some 55 blacks students about to attend newly integrating schools, rural proclamation of the religion, and human rights activities focused on the black minority. The work was capped with a parent-teacher banquet reception at a church and a picnic for the students conducted by the Baháʼí teachers. Firesides were held widely in rural areas around Greenville which featured singing, and the group supported petitioning for the public swimming pool being integrated. In 1965 Baháʼís participated in the Selma to Montgomery marches and arranged for telegrams according to the June issue of Baháʼí News. The National Assembly telegrammed the US President and the Southern Christian Leadership Conference. Eight Baháʼís including two from Montgomery are documented to have participated.

Across the 1960s and 1970s there was a significant suburbanization of the community along with the general society. Populations of Baha'is in major urban centers reduced growth rate and suburban centers and small towns became disproportionately high. Over the same time there were other demographic changes:

- a significant influx of youth occurred across the late 1960s and early 1970s across the country.
- National minorities grew in proportions in regions - African Americans in the South but also urban centers, Hispanics, East-Asians, and Indians in the Southwest. The news in 1971 was that the national count of Baháʼís had doubled - The Christian Century noted that in a "one-month, 13-county 'teaching conference' based in Dillon, South Carolina, 9,000 converts, most of them black, joined the Baha'i faith (sic), with hundreds more signing declaration cards in similar efforts throughout the south." The state with the single largest Baháʼí population was now South Carolina.

This was followed by a larger demographic change when Persian refugees from the Iranian Revolution of 1978-9 probably adding 15% to the national community though often in just a few urban areas. Overall demographics are not available save to note that the average community size - assembly or not - was about 5 people in 1947 and just over 14 in 1991.

At around 77,000 members in America, in 1982 Baháʼís testified before a Congress subcommittee on the situation in Iran following the Islamic revolution and this was followed up a couple years later, and again in 1988.

Meanwhile the accelerated growth of the worldwide community in the 1960s-1980s yielded a challenge for the social and economic development of communities. According to the Baháʼí teachings, development should increase people's self-reliance, communal solidarity, giving access to knowledge, and, where possible, removing sources of injustice. Spiritual, moral and material development should be linked together. These priorities are envisioned as crucial to the development of world peace. The religion entered a new phase of activity when a message of the Universal House of Justice dated 20 October 1983 was released. The Office of Social and Economic Development was established and Baháʼís were urged to seek out ways, compatible with the Baháʼí teachings, in which they could become involved in the social and economic development of the communities in which they lived. Worldwide in 1979 there were 129 officially recognized Baháʼí socioeconomic development projects. By 1987, the number of officially recognized development projects had increased to 1482. The Americas as a total held a significant percentage of these. Some examples in the United States:

- In 1984 the Center for Interracial Understanding was established in the summer of 1984 at Louhelen.
- Another project called a residential college, was founded at Louhelen in September 1985, and was part of its conception. It was announced in March 1986 it was accepting applications for the September 1986 enrollment combining formal study of the religion with a degree earning study at one or two nearby colleges. Students would live and work at the school, receive training, and go to one of these schools.
- A temporary effort was that of Tucson Baháʼís aid for 1985 Mexico City earthquake, as there was during and following Hurricane Hugo.
- Another programs was for youth called the Baháʼí Youth Workshop founded by Oscar DeGruy in 1974, that had groups organize and perform variously in the United States.
- 1996 was the beginning of the implementation of the Multi-Racial Unity Living Experience(MRULE) project by Richard Walter Thomas and Jeanne Gazel at Michigan State University, in the wake of the OJ Simpson murder case in Oct 1995. Thomas was approached by then provost Lou Anna Simon of MSU to have a means of resolving racial tensions in the midst of increasing diversity on campus.
- The Tahirih Justice Center was founded in 1997 for individuals seeking protection from human rights abuses.

A few communities of Bahá'ís in the country grew to 100s and Los Angeles grew to over one thousand members by the 1980s. In the 1980s the community saw the beginning of a significant increase in supplemental initiatives - special interest groups, academic and professional associations, and newsletters.

The United States Baháʼí administration was party to court cases over trademarks in 2005 and 2008, both of which produced rulings in favor of Baháʼí sects resulting from Mason Remey's schism (see - Ruling on Baháʼí trademarks).

== Modern community ==
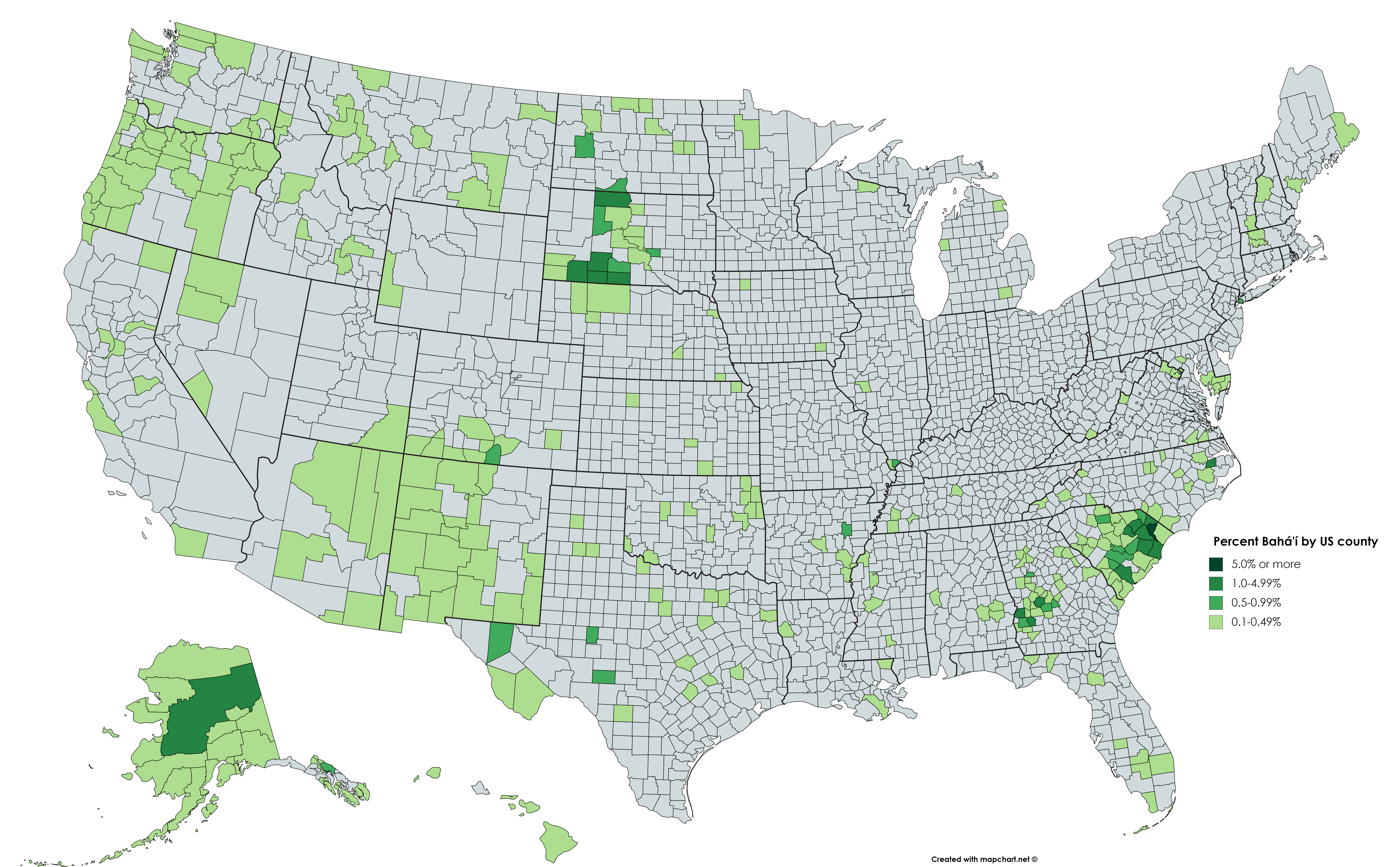
Percent of population of US counties that adhere to the Baháʼí Faith.

In December 1999, the National Spiritual Assembly of the United States stated that out of approximately 140,000 adult (15 and over) members on the rolls, only 70,000 had known addresses, and another estimate was of 137,000 plus Iranian refugees. Nearly 17 percent of US Baháʼís reported being international pioneers, while some 35 percent indicated homefront pioneering experience inside the United States to places the religion had not previously had a presence. The American Religious Identity Survey (ARIS) conducted in 2001, with a sample size of 50,000, estimated that there were 84,000 self-identifying adult (21 and over) Baháʼís in the United States. The Association of Religion Data Archives (relying on World Christian Encyclopedia) estimated there were some 525,000 Baháʼís in the United States in 2005 however internal counts in Feb 2011 show 175,000 excluding Alaska and Hawaiʻi. Danish researcher, Margit Warburg, stated that the Baháʼí figure reported in World Christian Encyclopedia for the United States is highly exaggerated. Nevertheless as of 2020 the Association of Statisticians of American Religious Bodies noted it as the largest non-Christian religion in the country measured by county.

With developmental roots back into the 19th century, the Ruhi Institute, an educational institution initially operating under the guidance of the National Spiritual Assembly of the Baháʼí Faith in Colombia but has been applied in the United States and studied. The goal is of involving more individuals in study leading to action. A focus of the Institute is to couple an evolving appreciation of virtues with processes of community development. After some decades of development, Baháʼí leadership adopted it as a key component of the evolving nature of Baháʼí life and the culture expressed.

Although a majority of Americans are Christians, Baháʼís make up the second-largest religious group in South Carolina as of May 2014. And based on data from 2010, Baháʼís were the largest minority religion in 80 counties out of the 3143 counties in the country. From the same 2010 data set, the largest populations of Baháʼís at the county-by-county level are in Los Angeles, CA, Palm Beach, FL, Harris County, TX, and Cook County, IL. However on a basis relative to the local population the highest relative density is in South Carolina and Bennett County, SD, especially near the Pine Ridge and Rosebud Indian Reservations, and Georgia. About 3,000 Baháʼís live in the Chicago area.

While early fictional works relating the religion occurred in Europe a number of them have appeared in the United States since the 1980s, sometimes in mass media - see Baháʼí Faith in fiction.

=== Slowdown in growth ===
Overall religious membership fell precipitously from 70% to 47% among all Americans from 2000 to 2020. The growth of the American Baháʼí community began to stall around the same time, seeing a 50% drop in enrollments from 1997 to 2007, and a 30% increase in withdrawals in 2006; Sen McGlinn, whose membership was rescinded by the Baháʼí administration, suggested that this could be related to a change in culture in the community and that a significant number of those leaving formally might still identify as Baháʼís. The 2005 annual report by the National Spiritual Assembly noted that growth declined by 60% in the previous 7 years, commenting, "By our assessment, that the number of annual enrollments has been declining reflects a period of active reassessment and planning for more systematic approaches to growth and retention" and, "the decline in growth is transitional." According to reports by the NSA, they saw 1,198 enrollments in the year to February 2005, 82 child registrations, 271 withdrawals, and 16 reinstatements; In 2009 there were 2,500 enrollments, 1200 child registrations, 322 withdrawals, and 35 reinstatements; and in 2015 there were 616 enrollments, 345 child registrations, 295 withdrawals, and 28 reinstatements.

According to the 2020 Annual Report of the NSA of the Baha'is of the US, there were 526 adult enrollments, 459 deaths and 347 withdrawals during a period of 12 months.

== Major centres ==
=== Greater Boston ===
The Baháʼí Faith in Greater Boston, a combined statistical area, has had glimpses of the religion in the 19th century arising to its first community of Baháʼís at the turn of the century. Early newspapers articles on the precursor Bábí religion were followed by a paper by Dr. Rev. Austin H. Wright as an untitled entry whose first quote is "notice of a singular character, who has for some years past played a prominent part on the stage of Persian life" dated February 10, 1851. It is considered the first paper giving an account on Bábism. Circa 1900 the community began to coalesce being near to Greenacre, an interfaith retreat early on. From then on the institution would progressively be associated with Baháʼís - a place where both locals and people from afar came to learn of the religion, and who officially took over controlling interest from 1913 following the wishes and controlling interest of its founder. Leaders rising to national prominence with a national level of organization soon arose after ʻAbdu'l-Bahá, then head of the religion, traveled through the area. Most prominent were from the area were Harlan Ober, William Henry Randall, and Alfred E. Lunt. Broadening recognitions of the community sometimes took the form of publicly noting their persecution in Morocco and then Iran, and presence in local concerts and fairs. In 1988 the national assembly of the United States picked Boston among its four foci for expansion of the religion and a conference of some 800 Baháʼís gathered. The modern community, albeit a tiny fraction of the wider population, is present in some concentrations and thin areas throughout the greater Boston area. Over the last couple decades, it has been systematically pursuing programs of neighborhood community building activities of study circles, children's classes, junior youth groups, and devotional meetings among the activities and observances of the religion.

=== South Carolina ===
The Baháʼí Faith in South Carolina begins in the transition from Jim Crow to the Civil Rights Movement but defines another approach to the problem, and proceeded according to its teachings. The first mention in relation to the history of the religion came in the 1860s in a newspaper article. Following this the first individual from South Carolina to find the religion was Louis Gregory in 1909, followed by individuals inside the state. Communities of Baháʼís were soon operating in North Augusta, Columbia and Greenville struggled with segregation culture through the 1950s externally and internally. However, in the 1969-1973 period, a very remarkable and somewhat unsustainable period of conversions to the religion on the basis of a meeting of Christian and Baháʼí religious ideas established a basis of community across several counties - notably Marion, Williamsburg, and Dillon, served by the Louis Gregory Institute and its radio station WLGI but also across the wider area. That community continues and has gathered news coverage as part of the second largest religion in South Carolina.

=== Alaska ===
Alaska is unusual in that it is not an independent nation recognized by the United Nations, and yet has a National Spiritual Assembly. Its specific statistics are not published, and are often not broken out in non-Baháʼí statistics of the US in general.

=== Hawaiʻi ===
The Baháʼí community in Hawaiʻi had its origins when Hawaiian-born Agnes Alexander, who became a Baháʼí in Paris in 1900, returned to the islands in 1901. Similar to Alaska, the Baháʼís of Hawaiʻi have an independent National Spiritual Assembly from that of the US, though it is itself one of the 50 United States. Independent statistics have not been published.

== Criticism ==
Juan Cole was an American Baháʼí professor of history who resigned from the religion in 1996 after conflicts with the Baháʼís. Cole went on to critically attack the Baháʼí Faith in several books and articles written from 1998-2000, describing a prominent Baháʼí as "inquisitor" and "bigot", and describing Baháʼí institutions as socially isolating, dictatorial, and controlling, and with financial irregularities. Soon after his resignation, Cole created an email list and website called H-Bahai, which became a repository of both primary source material and critical analysis on the religion.

== American Baháʼís ==
Outside the religion in general society prominent Baháʼís have been social and civic leaders Alain LeRoy Locke, Patricia Locke, Dorothy Wright Nelson and Layli Miller-Muro, entertainers Seals and Crofts, Dizzy Gillespie, Rainn Wilson, Andy Grammer and among academics Suheil Bushrui, and Dwight W. Allen. See List of Baháʼís for many other Baháʼís that have Wikipedia articles about them, and more generally Category:American Baháʼís. Such prominence does not connote authority or priority within the religion but simply a degree of public recognition. William Sears was a sports commentator and television personality, and Louis Gregory was an African-American lawyer, and both become prominent inside the religion as Hands of the Cause. Locke and Nelson were elected to the National Spiritual Assembly.

== See also ==
- Baháʼí Faith in North America
