= Guy Murchie =

American journalist

Guy Murchie

Guy Murchie (Jr.) (25 January 1907 – 8 July 1997) was an American writer about science and philosophy: aviation, astronomy, biology, and the meaning of life. He was, successively, a world traveler; a war correspondent; a photographer, staff artist, and reporter for the Chicago Tribune; a pilot and flight instructor; a teacher; a lecturer; an aerial navigator; a building contractor; and founder and director of a summer camp for children. He was a practising member of the Baháʼí Faith. His books included Men on the Horizon (1932), Song of the Sky (1954), Music of the Spheres (1961), and The Seven Mysteries of Life (1978). The latter three books were chosen for promotion by the Book of the Month Club. He illustrated his books with etchings and woodcuts of his own design.

== Early life ==
Murchie was the son of Ethel A. Murchie—who designed the interior of a seaplane for Sikorksy Aircraft—and Guy Murchie, Sr.: a graduate of Harvard Law School, a former member of Theodore Roosevelt's Rough Riders, a U.S. Marshal, and a prominent Boston attorney who at one time served as attorney to Winston Churchill. Sitting President Theodore Roosevelt and his wife attended Guy Jr.'s christening. His parents held him to high standards.

Murchie, who as an adult stood 6'6" tall and weighed 225 lbs., was raised as an Episcopalian, attended Kent School—which at the time was just "for boys"—and graduated from Harvard in 1929. From this heritage of privilege and physical capacity he instead turned to traveling and making his own way, never to return to the arena of Bostonian privilege. Instead he left before receiving his credentials on a trip headed to the Far East. Murchie returned to the States in 1930. From the experience, he gained a deep-seated appreciation for the basic commonality of humanity across any divide of culture, and in 1932 he published his first book (with his own illustrations)—Men on the Horizon—in Boston and London, dedicating it to his mother. In the same year he married Eleanor Forrester Parker Cushman, who was some 26 years his senior. Although the marriage eventually failed, Murchie dedicated his book The Seven Mysteries of Life to her after her death in 1960.

In 1944, he married Barbara Cooney, and fathered two children—Gretel and Barnaby—within three years. The marriage did not last, and Cooney left him.

== Writer ==
=== Men on the Horizon ===
When Murchie graduated from Harvard in 1929, he set out on an overseas journey, not even bothering to attend commencement, packing notepads in anticipation of publishing a travelogue. He began by working as an able-bodied seaman through the Panama Canal and up to Alaska, working the rails up to Whitehorse, and rowing himself down the Yukon River, then hiking, hitching a ride, and riding freight trains down to Seward. Unable to buy a ticket, he stowed away back to San Francisco, ultimately having to pay for the ride, and from there joined ship's crews to Hawaii and then to Japan.

From Japan onward, Murchie paid his way as a passenger, visiting several cities in China, the Philippines, Manchuria, Korea, and then Siberia, finally riding west to the Atlantic on passenger trains. He traveled frugally and sometimes suffered from the extreme cold of Manchuria and Siberia, as well as from the long waits in Soviet lines for food, train tickets, etc. The travelogue does not cover his travels beyond Moscow.

Murchie's stated purpose in taking this trip might have seemed to anticipate his future embrace of the Baháʼí Faith:

About the rest of [the world] I know only that it is made up of vast masses of men grouped in races and classes, unknown to each other, uninformed about each other, doubting and disliking each other—and yet, all of them made in the same image and of the same material, and all human. … I must find out for myself whether it is not ignorance, and ignorance alone, that prevents friendship and understanding between these masses of human beings.

In China, Murchie was exposed to some of the signs of the coming Communist revolution in China, for instance contrasts of starvation and gluttony, and frequent reports of conflict which Murchie reported as comically harmless. He summarizes, "China is not nearly so unstable politically as it seems." In Russia, Murchie saw the Russian Communists under Stalin as similar to Christian missionaries, and Communism itself a kind of religion. The account does not mention the economic crisis that was deepening in America at the time (1930).

Rear Admiral Richard E. Byrd wrote the foreword on the heels of his first Antarctic expedition—and wrote of first being interested in the "clean man" of Murchie, and did not take sides in Murchie's views on the governments of the day but was very struck by the encounter with people.

The book was a success. The New York Times reported it as a regional best seller in New England on 16 May 1932. It was generally well received, most of all for its humor, throughout America, Great Britain, Australia, and New Zealand.

=== Saint Croix, the Sentinel River ===
Named and about the history of the Saint Croix River today forming part of the border between Maine and New Brunswick. Saint Croix, the Sentinel River was well received academically and popularly at the time. However it continues to be of relevance as it was noted in the 1970s and then cited in post-2000 work on the internet.

=== Song of the Sky ===
Murchie got the material for his breakthrough work Song of the Sky from his experience and investigations as an aviator and flight instructor. Though the subject of the book is largely science (with some references to spiritual matters), the content is delivered in Murchie's characteristically poetic way. The book does not address religion at length, but it does mention Baháʼu'lláh, founder of Murchie's religion, the Baháʼí Faith.

Song of the Sky was a Book of the Month Club selection for December 1954. The American Museum of Natural History awarded him the John Burroughs Medal in 1956 for Song of the Sky.

Song of the Sky was plagiarized by writer Alexander Theroux in 1994, apparently because Theroux failed to source his notes.

=== Music of the Spheres ===
Originally published in 1961 it was revised and printed in 1967 and then reprinted in 1979.

Music of the Spheres was named as one of the American Library Association's Top 50 Books of 1961. The Society of Midland Authors awarded one of its "Thormond Monsen" awards to Music of the Spheres. As Murchie was then residing in Spain, the managing director of the US Baháʼí Publishing Trust accepted the award on his behalf. It was generally positively reviewed.

Of it Isaac Asimov is reported to have said "One can only stand amazed at the breadth of Mr. Murchie's understanding and his ability to put the facts and speculations of science into colorful and nontechnical language." Kurt Vonnegut has noted his indebtedness to it as well.

=== The Seven Mysteries of Life ===
In 1978 he published The Seven Mysteries of Life; it was reprinted in 1981 and 1999.

The Seven Mysteries are:

1. The Abstract Nature of the Universe
2. The Interrelatedness of All Creatures
3. The Omnipresence of Life
4. The Polarity Principle
5. Transcendence
6. The Germination of Worlds
7. Divinity

The book also discusses super-organism, language, properties of the mind, and individual consciousness. His review of literature identifies some 32 senses, as noted online. In it he quotes a Serbian proverb which is seen as part of the heritage of the idea put forth as We are made of star stuff: "Be humble for you are made of dung. Be noble for you are made of stars."

Passages from The Seven Mysteries of Life appeared in Baháʼí News as well as other periodicals like the Old Farmer's Almanac. It was Murchie's most Baháʼí book, not merely for mentioning the religion a number of times, but for discussing Baháʼí principles in somewhat disguised detail, advocating notions of personal immortality, and portraying the present life as a "soul school" that prepares humans for the afterlife. Furthermore, Murchie maintains that many of the boundaries in normal science are arbitrary; between planet and moon, between plant and animal and between life and non-life. He often makes it very clear when his examples are based on empirically verified science, and when they are not. Verifiable sources and references are frequently mentioned, making this (arguably) an effort of journalistic objectivity, despite its overtly philosophical, religious and poetic content and style. The subjects covered, however, are often exotic and unusual. While deeply concerned with religious philosophy, The Seven Mysteries of Life was a finalist for the 1982 National Book Award for science (paperback).

In hindsight, many of the "fringe" or discontinued areas of research that the book covers have recently been verified (or rediscovered) by modern experiments. Examples include the highly refined communication method seen in the waggle dance of honey bees, the regeneration and immortality properties of the tiny Hydra (genus), and the existence of Quasi-crystals (supramolecular).

Other examples, on the other hand, remain a scientific dead-end; the existence of interstellar ambiplasma and the so-called science of cymatics.

The visionary architect Buckminster Fuller is quoted as saying The Seven Mysteries of Life contains "... all the most important information about everything humanity needs to know …".

== Journalist ==
A newspaper story of Murchie's was published in the Winnipeg Tribune in 1934, and a piece in New Zealand in 1935, but his steady job was at the Chicago Tribune. Some 37 news stories were then printed in the Chicago Tribune under his name. The first story under his name at the Chicago Tribune was in 1934, followed by three in 1935, 1 in 1936, (the same year he earned his pilot's license,) none in 1937, and two in 1938. Some stories of his were noted in other newspapers. He co-wrote Soldiers of Darkness with Thomas R. Gowenlock, published in 1937.

Murchie's further interest in the Baháʼí religion began in this period when he was tasked with writing an article about the Baháʼí House of Worship at Wilmette, Illinois around 1938, and then officially joined the religion 1939. He had been impressed with the unique qualities of the temple being a blend of east and west styles, and extended his interest when his insights of the biological unity of humanity was raised to a spiritual affirmation.

Murchie began coverage of World War II with five stories printed in 1939, actually went overseas with fourteen in 1940, (the year he was also injured in an air raid,) three in 1941, five in 1942. Then he was back in the States.

== Aviator, camp founder, and teacher ==
In 1942 Murchie left the Tribune to work as a flight instructor and aerial navigator. His mother Ethel died in Florida in 1943 and he inherited the "Fairways Manor house" in Saint Andrews, New Brunswick, Canada. A relative tried to visit him in January 1944 back in the States but he had already moved. In 1944 Murchie married Barbara Cooney; during the three years of their marriage they had two children (Gretel and Barnaby). In 1946 the Murchie family moved to Pepperell, Massachusetts and worked with the high school. In 1947 the book Saint Croix, the Sentinel River was published and it is likely that this was written during time spent in St. Andrews at the house, while Cooney and Murchie divorced in 1947. Afterwards Murchie set up Apple Hill Camp, an international summer place for children in New Hampshire, operating it for 11 years during which he married Katie Rautenstrauch and both also worked as teachers. Holocaust survivor Alex Levy recalls working for Murchie at the camp.

== Baháʼí ==
Murchie became a Baháʼí in 1939, after covering the Baháʼí House of Worship that was under construction at the time and in May 1938 had been featured by a US stamp. He remained largely silent on the subject of his religion, only mentioning it in passing in his 1954 title Song of the Sky. In his autobiography, The Soul School, he alluded to a perceived distance between himself and the Baháʼí community during the war, as he imagined that his connection to the war effort put him at odds with the sentiments of many of them.

About a decade after the war, and immediately after Murchie's book Song of the Sky won him acclaim as a Book of the Month Club author, he began to be more public about his religion. Several news stories in the wider media noted it, and the official Baháʼí news outlet noted the publicity. In 1964, he toured Iran visiting several sites holy to Baháʼís. Diary notes of his travels became the basis of a series of articles in the 1960s and later. In 1958 he became even more public with his proclamation in the Chicago Tribune "I am a Baháʼí". This publicity was again noted by the Baháʼís, reportedly caused a boost in visitors to the Baháʼí House of Worship in Wilmette, Illinois, and liked so much that it was then released as a pamphlet, as well as in letters to the editors for correction. In it he noted the impressive history of the Báb, Tahirih, the encounter of Edward G. Browne with Baháʼu'lláh, the position and example of ʻAbdu'l-Bahá and appointed Guardian, and the religion's presence in the life of historically notable people like Marie of Romania and was close to President Wilson. Selections from it were used in a foreign language primer.

Murchie then set about studying Baháʼí history, researching for a book on the subject which he intended to publish under the name The Veil of Glory which is part of a collection of papers at the Howard Gotlieb Archival Research Center of Boston University. Murchie would be visible aiding various Baháʼí talks and classes of study on the religion occasionally from the 1960s into the 1980s, and would publish many more articles related to the religion printed in Baháʼí News:

- A visit to Persia across 5 issues(again, further from his 1964 trip)
- Nayriz – Scene of Vahid's Heroism,
- The House of Quddus in Mashhad,
- Journey through Northern Iran,
- Máh-Kú and Tabriz – Imprisonment and Martyrdom.
- The Flowering of the Planet (in 1974)

== Bibliography ==
- Men on the Horizon (PDF). Houghton Mifflin Co. 1932.
- St. Croix: the Sentinel River. Duell, Sloan & Pearce. 1947.
- Song of the Sky. Cambridge, MA: Riverside Press Cambridge. 1954. ISBN 0-87165-030-4.
- The World Above. Dell. 1954.
- The World Aloft. Houghton Mifflin. 1960.
- Music of the Spheres. Houghton Mifflin. 1961. ISBN 0-486-21809-0.
- The Seven Mysteries of Life: An Exploration in Science & Philosophy. Houghton Mifflin Harcourt. 1978. ISBN 0-395-95791-5.
- The Soul School: Confessions of a Passenger on Planet Earth. Fithian Press. 1995. ISBN 978-1-56474-105-9.

== Last years ==
Murchie spent much of the 1980s working on his Baháʼí history project, The Veil of Glory, which he was unable to publish. After the death of his wife Katie on 3 May 1986, Murchie moved to California and married an old friend, Marie, at the home of Murchie's friends Marzieh and Harold Gail. The Murchies settled in Santa Barbara. Around this time, Murchie reunited with his daughter Gretel and traveled with her to India. He worked on his autobiography, The Soul School, during this period, and published it in 1995. Murchie spent his last years in a group home in Orange County.

In January 1990 the Toronto newspaper The Globe and Mail published a string of articles by Murchie—a couple new and eight reprints from 1978.

Murchie died in 1997 in Fullerton, California.
