= Claire Berger =

French physicist

- Education: Université Joseph Fourier (PhD)
- Scientific career
- Fields: Physics
- Thesis: Propriétés électroniques des alliages quasicristallins AlMn (1987)

Claire Berger is a French physicist at the Georgia Institute of Technology and a Director of Research at the French National Centre for Scientific Research (CNRS). Berger has co-authored over 200 publications in international journals and has a citation index of 10,880. She has won a number of prizes including the CNRS medal for Young Researcher and the Louis Ancel Prize of the French Physical Society. She was elected fellow of the American Physical Society.

== Early life and education ==
Claire Berger was born in Paris.

Berger took as the subject of her PhD the electronic properties of AIMn quasicrystals. She gained her doctorate at the Joseph Fourier University, now part of the University of Grenoble, France, making hers the first thesis in France on quasicrystals (crystals declared non-existent by orthodoxies of 20th century science).

== Career ==
Having studied and produced amorphous films in a postdoctoral position at the French Alternative Energies and Atomic Energy Commission (CEA), in 1988 she joined the Institut Néel in Grenoble, where she worked on electronic properties of quasi-crystals. She was hired as a researcher at the CNRS's Laboratory for Study of Electronic Properties of Solids (LEPES), where she contributed to the experimental evidence for a metal-insulator transition in the compound quasicrystalline materials grown and characterised at LEPES.

Berger moved to Georgia Tech in 2001.

She is notable for her co-authorship of the first article demonstrating the two dimensional properties of graphene and for proposing the use of graphene in electronics. Together with Walt de Heer and Phil First she co-authored the first patent for graphene electronics in 2003.

Her current scientific interests are primarily in the field of nano science and the electronic properties of graphene-based systems.

== Awards ==
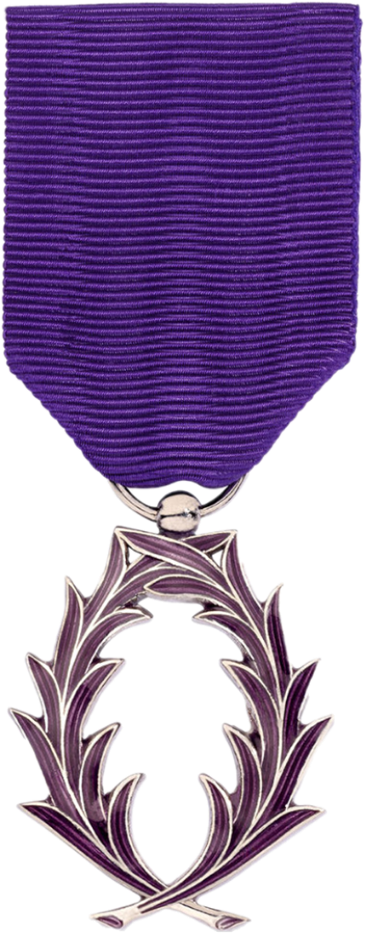
Chevalier de l'ordre des Palmes académiques

CNRS medal for Young Researcher

2001: Louis Ancel Prize of the French Physical Society

2023: Chevalier of the Ordre des Palmes Académiques.

== Selected publications ==
- Exceptional ballistic transport in epitaxial graphene nanoribbons, with J. Baringhaus, M. Ruan , F. Edler, A. Tejeda, M. Sicot, A. Taleb-Ibrahimi, A.P. Li, Z. Jiang, E.H. Conrad, C. Tegenkamp, W. A. de Heer, in Nature No. 506, 2014, p. 349.
- Crystalline Silicon Transfer: A Top-Down Solution to Integrate Epitaxial Graphene into Silicon CMOS, with R. Dong, Z. Guo, M. Ruan, J. Kunc, S. K Bhattacharya, W. A. de Heer, in J. Phys D, 47, 094001, 8pp, 2014.
- A wide band gap metal-semiconductor-metal nanostructure made entirely from graphene, with J. Hicks, A. Tejeda, A. A. Taleb-Ibrahimi, M.S. Nevius, F. F. Wang, K. Shepperd, J. J. Palmer, F. Bertran, P. Le Fèvre, J. Kunc, W. A. de Heer, E.H. Conrad, in Nature Physics No. 9, 2013, p. 49.
- Record Maximum Oscillation Frequency in C-face Epitaxial Graphene transistors, with Z. Guo, R. Dong, P.S. Chakraborty, N. Lourenco, J. Palmer, Y. Hu, M. Ruan, J. Hankinson, J. Kunc, J. D. Cressler, W. A. de Heer, in Nano Letters No. 13, 2013, p. 942.
- Epitaxial graphene on silicon carbide: Introduction to structured graphene, with M. Ruan, Y. Hu, Z. Guo, R. Dong, J. Palmer, J. Hankinson, W. A. de Heer, in MRS Bulletin No. 37, 2012, p. 1146.
