= Association of Statisticians of American Religious Bodies =

- Abbreviation: ASARB
- Formation: 1935
- Legal status: Non-profit organization
- Purpose: Professional Association
- Headquarters: Lenexa, Kansas, US
- President: Daniel Price
- Secretary-Treasurer: D. Scott Kostencki
- Website: http://www.asarb.org/; https://usreligioncensus.org/

The Association of Statisticians of American Religious Bodies (ASARB) is an American non-profit organization that brings together statisticians from various religious groups in the United States, with the aim of compiling accurate statistics regarding all such groups. It was established in 1935 and is based in Lenexa, Kansas. Since 1990, it has sponsored the US Religion Census, a national survey of Americans' religious beliefs conducted independently of, but at the same time as, the United States Census. This survey had previously been conducted by the National Council of Churches. It has become increasingly important since the US Census stopped asking Americans about their religion after World War II.

== See also ==
- U.S. Religion Census
