= Baháʼí News =

- Editor: John Bowers
- Categories: Religion
- Frequency: Monthly
- Publisher: National Spiritual Assembly of the Baháʼís of the United States
- Founded: 1924, under the name Baháʼí News Letter
- First issue: December 1924
- Final issue Number: October 1990; No. 714
- Country: United States
- Language: English
- ISSN: 0195-9212
- OCLC: 3665115

Baháʼí News was a monthly magazine, published between December 1924 and October 1990, that covered "news and events in the worldwide Baháʼí community." The magazine was first published as Baháʼí News Letter for 40 issues, changing to Baháʼí News from issue 41 onwards. A significant portion of the content of Baháʼí News touched upon worldwide developments in the Baháʼí community and the achievement of pioneering goals, as well as developments in the American Baháʼí community. Digitized issues are available online.

American Baháʼí, a successor periodical which began publication in 1970 and is still in production, carries a particular focus on domestic developments in the American Baha'i community.

== Impact ==
Baháʼí News was founded as part of Shoghi Effendi's strengthening of the administration of the Baháʼí Faith in his role as Guardian. As William Garlington writes in his book The Baha'i Faith in America, "[E]mphasis was placed on developing positive methods of communication between the various Baha'i administrative institutions. Special attention was given to the proper relationship between local and national assemblies as well as the desired manner of interaction between the National Convention and National Spiritual Assembly. This effort was assisted by the national publication of Baháʼí News beginning in 1924, which provided all Baháʼí access to the Guardian's correspondence".

Further it “should become a great factor in promoting understanding, providing information on Baháʼí activity, both local and foreign, in stimulating interest, in combating evil influences, and in upholding and safeguarding the institutions of the Cause. It should be made as representative as possible, should be replete with news, up-to-date in its information, and should arouse the keenest interest among believers ... in every corner of the globe.”

== Similar periodicals ==
Another periodical, Star of the West, was initially named Baháʼí News as well, and its dates of publication (from 1910 to 1935) overlapped with Baháʼí News.
