= Quasi-crystals (supramolecular) =

Supramolecular aggregates

Quasi-crystals are supramolecular aggregates exhibiting both crystalline (solid) properties as well as amorphous, liquid-like properties.

Self-organized structures termed "quasi-crystals" were originally described in 1978 by the Israeli scientist Valeri A. Krongauz of the Weizmann Institute of Science, in the Nature paper, Quasi-crystals from irradiated photochromic dyes in an applied electric field.

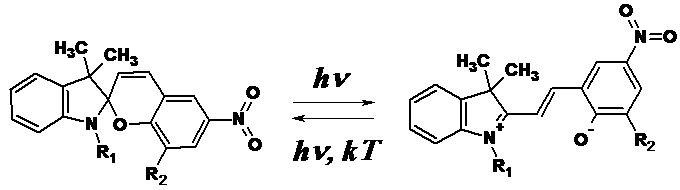
Scheme 1. Formation of merocyanine dipoles upon irradiation

In his 1978 paper Krongauz coined the term “Quasi-Crystals” for the new self-organized colloidal particles . The Quasi-crystals are supramolecular aggregates manifesting both crystalline properties e.g. Bragg scattering, as well as amorphous, liquid-like properties i.e. drop-like shapes, fluidity, extensibility and elasticity in electric field. The supramolecular Quasi-crystals are produced in photochemical reaction by exposing solutions of photochromic spiropyran molecules to UV radiation. The ultraviolet light induces the conversion of the spiropyrans to merocyanine molecules that manifest electric dipole moments. (see Scheme 1). The quasi-crystals have external shape of submicron globules and their internal structure consists of crystals enveloped by an amorphous matter (see Fig. 1). The crystals are formed by self-assembled stacks of the merocyanine molecular dipoles aligning themselves in a parallel manner, while amorphous envelopes consist of the same merocyanine dipoles aligned in an anti-parallel manner (Fig. 1, Scheme 2). In an applied electrostatic field, quasi-crystals form macroscopic threads that show linear optical dichroism.

Later Krongauz described unusual phase transitions of molecules composed of mesogenic and spiropyran moieties, which he named "quasi-liquid crystals." A micrograph of their mesophase appeared on the cover of Nature in a 1984 paper, “Quasi-Liquid Crystals.” The investigation of spiropyran-merocyanine self-organized systems, including macromolecules (see, for example, Fig. 2), has continued over the years.

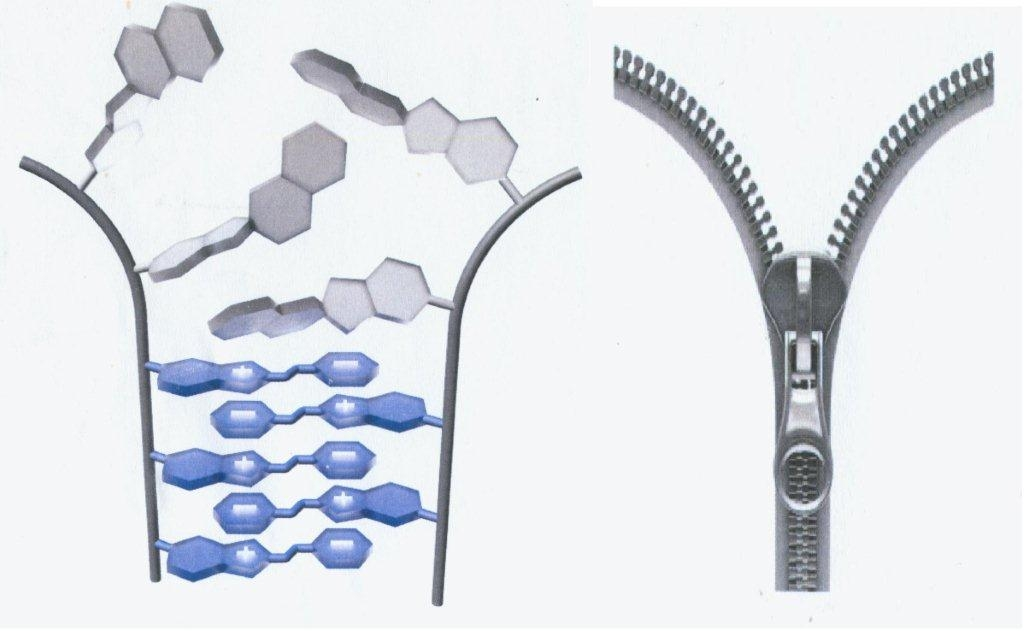
Figure 2. Illustration of Self-Assembling Spiropyran Polymers by Zipper Crystallization

These studies have resulted in discoveries of unusual and practically significant phenomena. Thus, in the electrostatic field, quasi-crystals and quasi-liquid crystals have exhibited 2nd order non-linear optical properties.

Potential applications of these fascinating materials have been described and patented.

Work on spiropyran-merocyanine self-assemblies currently continues in several laboratories.
