= Samimi =

Samimi is an Iranian surname. Notable people with this surname include:

- Abbas Samimi (born 1977), Iranian discus thrower
- Alireza Samimi (born 1987), Iranian futsal player
- Idin Samimi Mofakham (born 1982), Iranian composer
- Kamran Samimi (1925–1981), Iranian academic and translator
- Mahmoud Samimi (born 1988), Iranian discus thrower
- Mohammad Samimi (born 1987), Iranian discus thrower
- Vasfi Samimi (1908–1981), Albanian footballer, writer and doctor
