= Baháʼí Faith in Iran =

The Baháʼí Faith is a world religion that was founded in the 19th century Middle East. Its founders and the majority of its early followers were of Iranian heritage, and it is widely regarded as the second-largest religion in Iran after Islam. (Note: See Yarsanism, which also makes this claim.) Though most Baháʼís in Iran are of a Muslim background, the 19th century conversions of sizeable numbers of individuals from Judaism and Zoroastrianism in the country are also well documented.

The early history of the Baháʼí Faith in Iran covers the lives of these founders, their families, and their earliest prominent followers known by honorific designations such as the Letters of the Living and the Apostles of Baháʼu'lláh.

Since its inception the Baháʼí Faith has promoted democratically elected councils; the promotion of modern education as a priority within families (with emphasis on female education) and specific encouragement of women's equality with men. Iranian Baháʼís have created schools, agricultural cooperatives, and medical clinics across the country for themselves and others. Iran is also where the greatest persecution of Baháʼís has taken place—including the denial of education, arbitrary arrest, and killing. Iran's long history of state-sponsored persecution against Bábís and Baháʼís is well documented. The website "Archives of Baháʼí Persecution in Iran" has compiled thousands of documents, reports, testimonials, photos, and videos revealing proof of efforts to suppress and eliminate Baháʼís, particularly since the Iranian revolution of 1979.

From the nineteenth century onward, Bahá'ís in Iran sought to translate the teachings of Bahá'u'lláh and 'Abdu'l-Bahá into practical service that benefited not only their own community but also contributed to Iran's wider social development and modernization, despite recurring persecution and legal and social restrictions. Through elected consultative councils—later formalized as spiritual assemblies—they promoted collective decision-making, accountability, and broad participation, offering an alternative to both autocratic rule and clerical hierarchy while also shaping early approaches to constitutional and democratic ideas. Their initiatives addressed concrete needs such as education, health, and social welfare, including the establishment of modern schools and programs that expanded access to girls' education, public hygiene measures, vocational training, and charitable and economic enterprises that served the broader population. Iranian Bahá'ís also contributed significantly to the worldwide spread of the Faith through travel, pioneering, and participation in international teaching plans, providing volunteers and resources that helped establish and strengthen Bahá'í communities across the Middle East, Asia, Africa, Europe, and the Americas.

== Origins and early years ==
=== Central figures ===
==== The Báb ====
Baháʼís trace the origin of their faith to 1844, when Siyyid 'Alí-Muhammad of Shiraz taught that he was a divine messenger with a mission to prepare for the imminent appearance of the "Promised One" of all religions. 'Alí-Muhammad was a direct descendant of Muhammad, born on 20 October 1819, and referred to himself as the "Báb", a religious title meaning "the Gate", indicating his position as a spiritual "gate to divine knowledge", and to a still greater God-sent educator whose imminent appearance he was preparing the way for. The bedrock of his theology was that a new era in human history had dawned, during which the oneness of all religions and their progressive nature as successive stages of guidance from the same Creator would become clear.

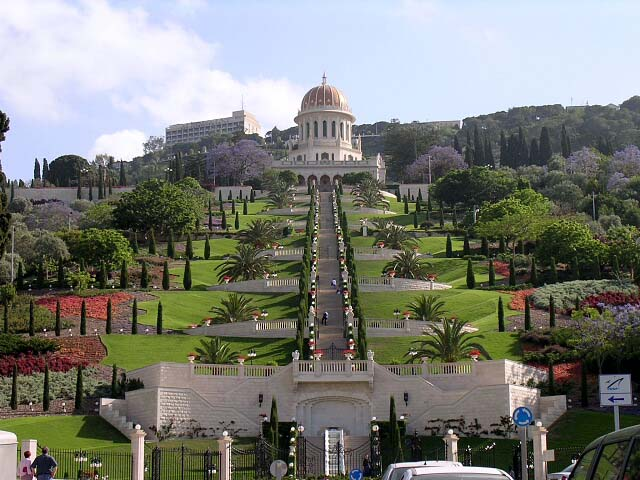
The Shrine of the Báb, located in Haifa, Israel, is an important place of pilgrimage for all Baháʼís

As the Báb's teachings spread thousands soon became followers. Islamic clergy began to stir up hostility towards the Báb and violence against his adherents (called Bábís). Insisting divine revelation had ended with Muhammad, Muslim clerics denounced the Báb's ideas as heretical, and also portrayed them as destabilizing for the best interests of the Shah of Persia. By manipulating support from fearful authorities, such clergy initiated a frenzy of persecution fueled by fanatical hatred rooted in religious prejudice. As killings began to spread around the country they ultimately resulted in wanton massacres of an estimated 20,000 Bábís. In a desperate bid to eradicate his faith, Persia's prime minister ordered the public execution of the Báb; it took place in Tabriz on 9 July 1850 before an estimated crowd of 10,000, in circumstances reported as miraculous by both Iranian eyewitnesses and foreign diplomats. (Note: Details of the "miraculous circumstances" surrounding the martyrdom of the Báb are found in chapter XXIII (pp. 500-526) of The Dawn-Breakers, an historical account of the lives and martyrdoms of the Báb and many of his major early followers. This important historical reference work of the Baháʼí Faith provides great detail on the persecution of Bábís/Baháʼís in Iran. It was written by noted early believer Muḥammad-i-Zarandí, commonly known as Nabíl-i-A'zam.) Oppression against the faith in Iran has continued unabated ever since, up through the present day.

The Báb proclaimed he was the first of two "twin" manifestations of God sent by the Creator to prepare humanity for, and to usher in, its age of maturity when the human race as a whole will finally realize global unity. Baháʼís hold that the Báb's teachings lay the groundwork "for the eventual establishment of a society characterized by the unity of nations, fellowship of religions, equal rights of all people, and a compassionate, consultative, tolerant, democratic, moral world order". Woven throughout the Báb's teachings are references to "Him whom God shall make manifest", the great Promised One for whom he was preparing the way. In numerous prophesies the Báb stated that next divine educator would appear soon after the Báb's own passing. In one of his major works, the Báb stated: "Well is it with him who fixeth his gaze upon the Order of Baháʼu'lláh, and rendereth thanks unto his Lord."

==== Baháʼu'lláh ====
Husayn ʻAlí Núrí was one of the earliest and most active followers of the Báb. He first became known by the title "Baháʼu'lláh" (meaning "the Glory of God") among Bábís. Born on 12 November 1817 in Tehran, Baháʼu'lláh's father was a wealthy government minister who traced his ancestry to monarchs of the great Sasanian Empire. As the initial pogrom against Bábís spread across Iran, Baháʼu'lláh was spared due to his acknowledged public reputation for devoted service to the poor and the prestige of his family. However that ended when two disturbed youths, obsessed with the execution of the Báb which they blamed on the reigning monarch, attempted to assassinate Naser al-Din Shah on 15 August 1852. Though investigations showed the pair acted alone, a "reign of terror" was unleashed, killing at least 10,000 Bábís that same year as government ministers vied with one another to collectively punish known or suspected Bábís. Because of his prominence in support of the Bábí cause, Baháʼu'lláh was arrested and incarcerated in the notorious Síyáh-Chál of Tehran, where he was bound in heavy chains that left life-long scars. When Baháʼu'lláh did not quickly perish as had been expected, his food was poisoned—which impaired his health for years. Baháʼu'lláh was kept in that dungeon for four months, as the mother of the Shah and authorities seeking to curry favor with the king sought ways to justify executing him. When it was proven beyond any doubt that Baháʼu'lláh was absolutely innocent of any wrongdoing, the Shah finally agreed to free him but decreed Baháʼu'lláh would be forever banished from Iran. Dispossessed of his extensive properties and wealth, in the exceptionally severe winter of January 1853 Baháʼu'lláh with family members undertook a three-month journey to Baghdad, thus beginning what became exile for the rest of his life in territories of the Ottoman Empire.

From Baghdad, Baháʼu'lláh dispatched communications and teachers to inspire and revive the persecuted followers of the Báb in Iran. In 1863, on the eve of departing for Constantinople (now Istanbul) at the invitation of Ottoman authorities, Baháʼu'lláh declared, to the many Bábís who had followed him to Iraq, that he was the Promised One foretold by the Bab—a revelation which had come to him in visions that mark the beginning of his mission in 1852 while chained in the dungeon of Tehran. Following malicious misrepresentations by the Persian ambassador to the Ottoman court, less than four months after arriving in Constantinople Baháʼu'lláh was banished by Sultan Abdulaziz to Adrianople (now Edirne); then in 1868 he was moved as an Ottoman prisoner to their penal colony in ʻAkká (now Acre, in modern Israel).

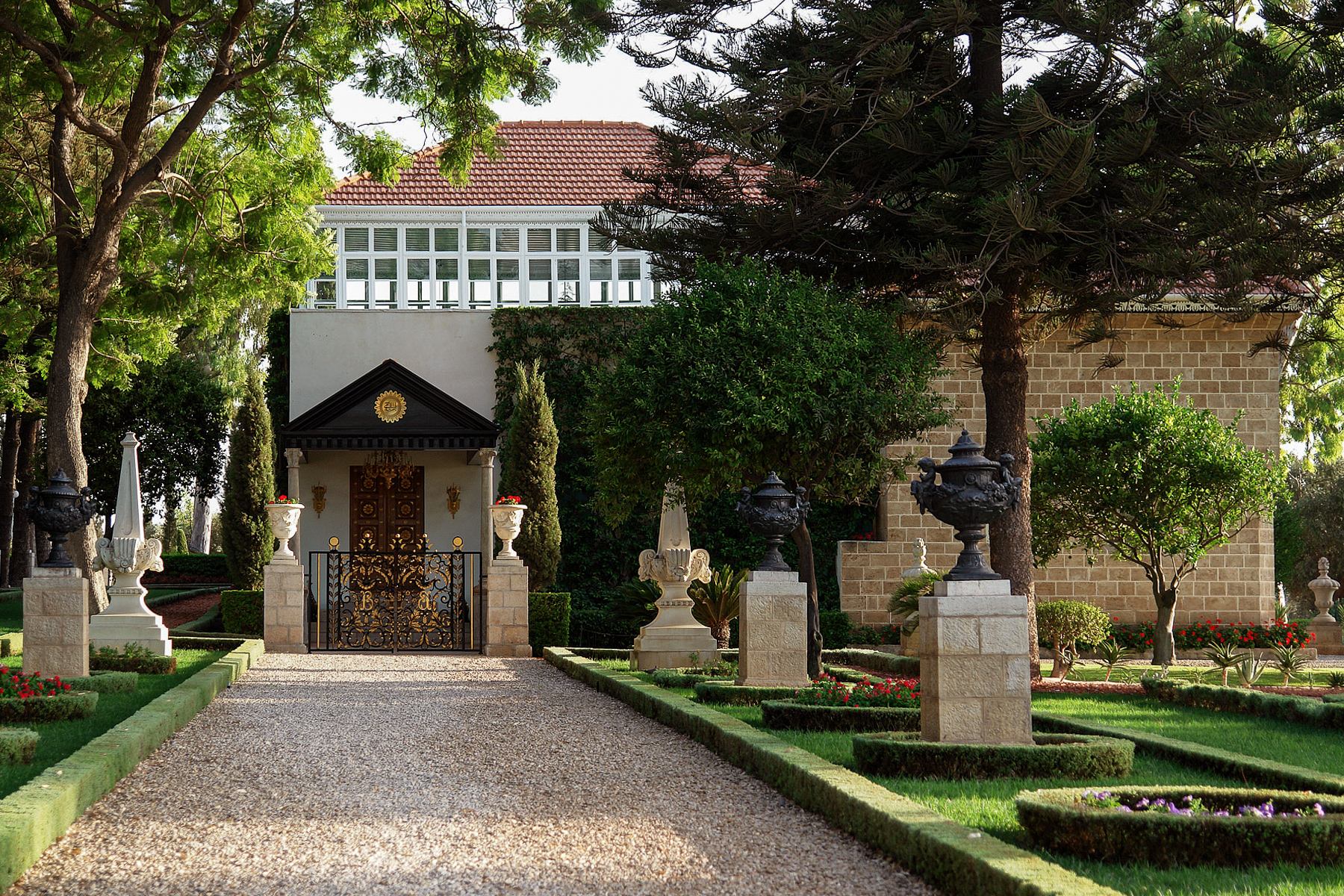
The Shrine of Baháʼu'lláh in Bahjí is an important place of pilgrimage for Baháʼís from around the world

First in Constantinople, then in Adrianople and 'Akka, Baháʼu'lláh publicly proclaimed his mission as a messenger of God in missives directed to major religious and secular rulers of the time, including Czar Alexander II, Napoleon III, Pope Pius IX, and Queen Victoria. Throughout the remainder of Baháʼu'lláh's life most Bábís became his followers, and adherents became known as Baháʼís. (Note: "Soon after his visit to Persia in the autumn of 1889 Lord Curzon of Kedleston wrote... 'the Baháʼís are now believed to comprise nineteen-twentieths of the Bábí persuasion.'") Over the three decades in which Baháʼu'lláh revealed his teachings it became clear how they fulfilled and augmented the prophetic intent of the Báb in stating his message would become "a world religion centering on the principle of the oneness of humankind." (Note: The Báb's extensive writings are inextricably related to those of Baháʼu'lláh. "The theological foundations of the Baháʼí teachings are first articulated in the writings of the Bab; thus those writings are indispensable to understanding the theology as well as the history of the Baháʼí Faith. If the Báb reinterpreted the Islamic concept of holy war in ways that effectively excluded violence, Baháʼu'lláh would formally and unequivocally abrogate it altogether, making the removal of the sword (with its implications of the larger principle of the equality and unity of all human beings) the cornerstone of the religion that would become known to the world as the Baháʼí Faith." (Saiedi 2000, p. 243) (Saiedi 2008, p. 28)) Baháʼu'lláh's large body of writings, in both Persian and Arabic, are equivalent to more than 100 volumes. Currently translated into at least 800 languages, Baháʼu'lláh's writings form the foundation upon which the worldwide Baháʼí community now stands in virtually every country on earth. (Note: Though a small percentage of Bahá'u'lláh's original writings have been translated into English, those completed include many of his most important works.)

Towards the end of his life, the strict harsh confinement ordered for Baháʼu'lláh was gradually relaxed by authorities in 'Akka who came to greatly admire him, and he was allowed to live in a home nearby, while still officially a prisoner of that city. Baháʼu'lláh passed in 1892, and his resting place at Bahjí is globally regarded by Baháʼís as a place of pilgrimage. At the time of Baháʼu'lláh's passing, the Baháʼí Faith had members in 13 countries of Asia and Africa. Under the leadership of his son ʻAbdu'l-Bahá, the faith gained a footing in Europe and America, and was further consolidated in Iran—though it continued all the while to suffer intense persecution there.

==== ʻAbdu'l-Bahá ====
The eldest son of Baháʼu'lláh and his wife Navvab was born in Tehran on 23 May 1844, he was named 'Abbas after his paternal grandfather. Because Baháʼu'lláh commonly referred to him as "the Master", most Baháʼís used that term for him until Baháʼu'lláh's passing. After that, he was best known as ʻAbdu'l-Bahá, which means the "servant of Bahá"—a designation he requested Baháʼís use when referring to him, as a constant reminder of his servitude to Baháʼu'lláh and to his cause. In Baháʼu'lláh's written Will he directed all believers to faithfully turn to ʻAbdu'l-Bahá as Head of the Baháʼí Faith, as the Centre of the Covenant of Baháʼu'lláh, and as the sole authoritative Interpreter of his writings.

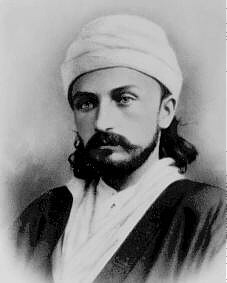
Passport photo of ʻAbdu'l-Bahá taken in Constantinople when he was 24

ʻAbdu'l-Bahá's early childhood in Iran was greatly influenced by his father being a prominent Bábí, and by his parents' families belonging to the country's aristocracy. He and his younger siblings—a sister, Bahíyyih, and a brother, Mihdí—lived in a carefree environment of privilege and happiness. With his father declining a ministerial position in the royal court, during his boyhood ʻAbdu'l-Bahá was witness to his parents' various charitable endeavors. ʻAbdu'l-Bahá received no formal education except for about a year of preparatory school at the age of seven. As he grew he was educated by his mother and an uncle; but most of his learning came from his father. After meeting ʻAbdu'l-Bahá in 1890, noted British orientalist Edward Granville Browne remarked "conversation with him served only to heighten the respect with which his appearance had from the first inspired me. One more eloquent of speech, more ready of argument, more apt of illustration, more intimately acquainted with the sacred books of the Jews, the Christians, and the Muhammadans, could, I should think, scarcely be found even amongst the eloquent, ready, and subtle race to which he belongs. These qualities, combined with a bearing at once majestic and genial, made me cease to wonder at the influence and esteem which he enjoyed even beyond the circle of his father's followers. About the greatness of this man and his power no one who had seen him could entertain a doubt."

When ʻAbdu'l-Bahá was seven, he contracted tuberculosis; though physicians held little hope for his recovery, he was suddenly cured (Note: ʻAbdu'l-Bahá was, however, plagued with bouts of illness for the rest of his life. (Hogenson, Lighting the Western Sky, p. 82.)) prior to Baháʼu'lláh's banishment from Iran and thus went into exile with him. The event that most affected ʻAbdu'l-Bahá during his childhood in Iran was the 1852 imprisonment of his father for being a prominent Bábí. On one occasion ʻAbdu'l-Bahá accompanied his mother to visit Baháʼu'lláh during his incarceration in the infamous Síyáh-Chál. He described how "I saw a dark, steep place. We entered a small, narrow doorway, and went down two steps, but beyond those one could see nothing. In the middle of the stairway, all of a sudden we heard His [Baháʼu'lláh's] … voice: 'Do not bring him in here', and so they took me back. We sat outside, waiting for the prisoners" to be brought out. From the age of eight ʻAbdu'l-Bahá shared in his father's exile and imprisonment, and even after Baháʼu'lláh's passing ʻAbdu'l-Bahá remained a prisoner of the Ottomans until he was 64, when the Young Turk Revolution of 1908 resulted in the sudden release of all religious and political prisoners held under the old regime. Between 1910 and 1913 ʻAbdu'l-Bahá made several journeys to the West to spread the Baháʼí message beyond its middle-eastern roots. Throughout his life ʻAbdu'l-Bahá maintained a voluminous correspondence to encourage and guide Baháʼí individuals and communities in Iran and around the world. There are over 27,000 extant documents by ʻAbdu'l-Bahá; among the more well-known are The Secret of Divine Civilization, Some Answered Questions, Tablets of the Divine Plan, and the Tablet to Auguste-Henri Forel. Notes taken of his many talks before groups large and small while he traveled in Europe and North America have also been published.

ʻAbdu'l-Bahá died on 28 November 1921 in Haifa (then part of Mandatory Palestine; now Israel's third-largest city). ʻAbdu'l-Bahá's funeral the next day was unlike any ever seen in Palestine: "The High Commissioner of Palestine, Sir Herbert Samuel, the Governor of Jerusalem, the Governor of Phoenicia, the Chief Officials of the Government, the Consuls of the various countries resident in Haifa, the heads of the various religious communities, the notables of Palestine, Jews, Christians, Moslems, Druses, Egyptians, Greeks, Turks, Kurds, and a host of His American, European and native friends, men, women and children,...about ten thousand in number", formed a vast funeral procession of mourners—a spontaneous tribute of love and respect for one who had for over 50 years served, and worked to unite, them all.

=== Under the Qajar dynasty (1844 – 1925) ===
When the Báb declared his prophetic mission in Iran in 1844 the country's sovereign was Muhammad Shah, third monarch of the Qajar dynasty, who ruled from 1834 to 1848. His prime minister Haji Mirza Aqasi actively supported prejudicial requests by Muslim clerics directed against the Báb and Bábís, even becoming an accomplice in their persecutions by convincing the Shah to banish the Báb far from his followers to the remote mountain fortresses of Maku and Chehriq in northwestern Azerbaijan.

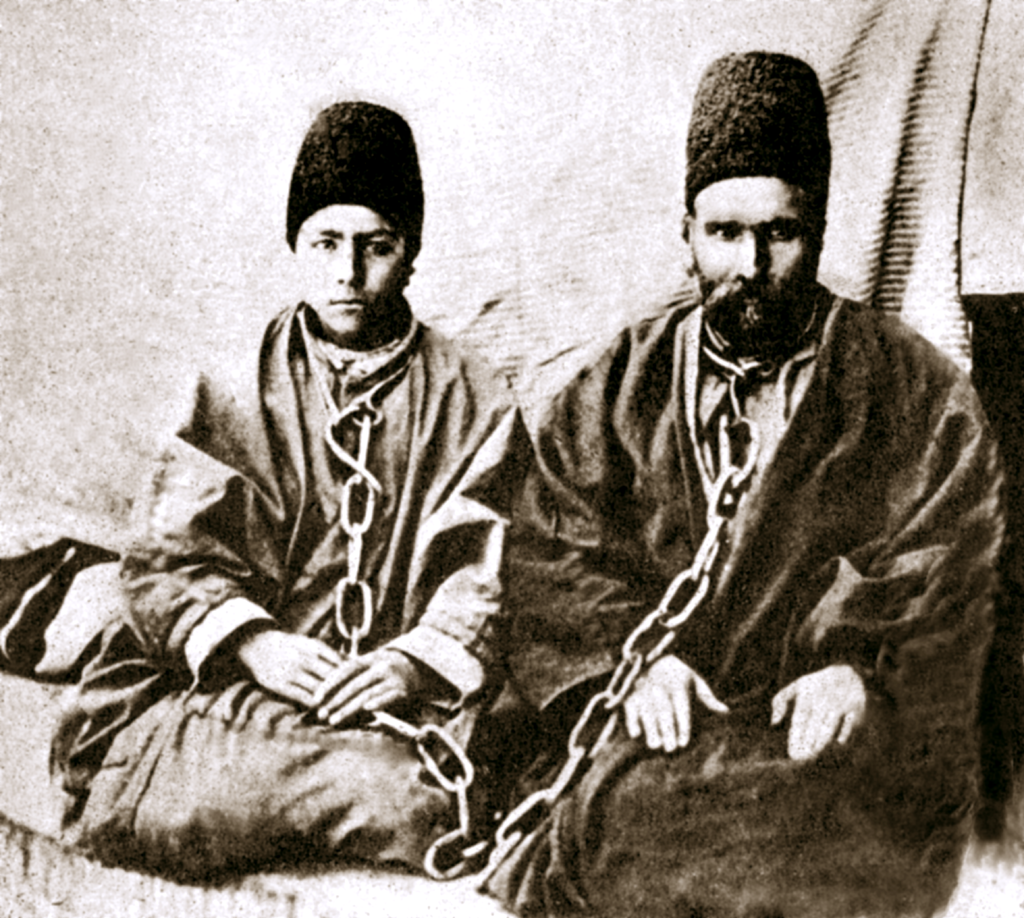
Varqá (r) and his 12 year old son Rúhu'lláh (l), in prison before their 1896 execution for being Baháʼís

Naser al-Din Shah, who succeeded his father in 1848, gave ready assent for the execution of the Báb in 1850; and it was he who decreed Baháʼu'lláh's banishment from Iran in 1852. His first prime minister, Mirza Taqi Khan, was overtly hostile to Bábís and personally ordered the execution of the Báb and several other prominent Bábís; ʻAbdu'l-Bahá referred to him as the greatest oppressor of the Baháʼí Faith in Iran. Under the Qajars an estimated 20,000 Bábís were murdered in Iran for their religious beliefs, while additional tens of thousands suffered innumerable other forms of persecution. Accounts of early persecution and suffering under Qajar rule are found in detail in The Dawn-Breakers, an historical account of the Báb and many of his early followers. This important Baháʼí reference work is based on first-hand accounts reported by early believers.

In later years of Qajar rule, "anti-Bábí pogroms and campaigns usually occurred during provincial or national crises such as those caused by harvest failures, famines, and epidemics. The Bábís (and later Baháʼís) served as scapegoats to cover the state's failure in relation to European economic and political intrusion. Drawing the attention of the public to the evils of this 'devious sect' served to consolidate the relationship between the Qajar government and the clergy." The last Qajar king, Ahmad Shah, was sidelined in a military operation supported by the British and led by military officer Reza Khan, who arranged for his subsequent appointment as Iran's minister of war. Following his departure for Europe in 1923, Ahmad Shah was formally deposed by Iran's parliament in 1925, ending the Qajar dynasty.

=== Under the Pahlavi dynasty (1925 – 1979) ===
After Ahmad Shah was deposed at Reza Khan's instigation, the latter was soon proclaimed Iran's new monarch, Reza Shah Pahlavi. The founder of the Pahlavi dynasty, Reza Shah's reign lasted until 1941 when the Allies forced him to abdicate after the Anglo-Soviet invasion of Iran. He was succeeded by his son, Mohammad Reza Pahlavi, the last shah of Iran. Although a few Baháʼís with unique qualifications and integrity were placed in positions of trust by both Pahlavis, and overall incidents of physical assault and murder decreased under them, their respective governments formalized policies of discrimination against Baháʼís as concessions to clergy.

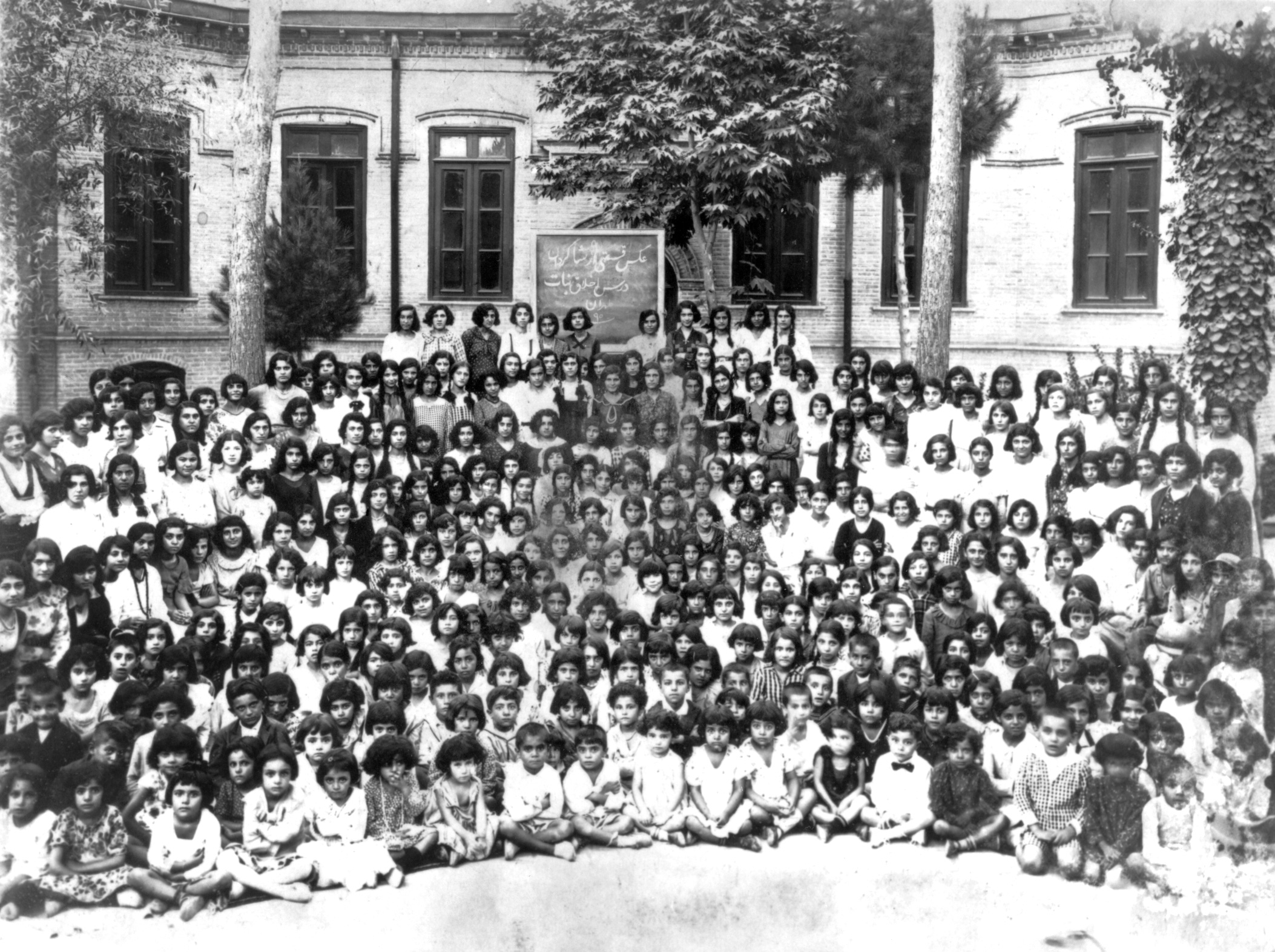
Gathering of youngsters on 13 August 1933 at Tehran's Tarbiyat Baháʼí school for girls. At least 47 such Baháʼí-operated schools were forcibly closed under the Pahlavi government in 1934

As a result, though Baháʼís remained Iran's largest religious minority, these shahs denied the basic rights of Baháʼís in numerous ways, including not being allowed to register their marriages; forcing the permanent closure of at least 47 schools (Note: In 1933, before being forced to close by the government, Baháʼís operated "at least 47 primary schools...of which at least eight also had secondary level classes.... By one scholar's count, these schools had a combined enrollment of more than 4,700 students." These schools were in every region of Iran, including major cities like Hamadan, Kashan, Mashhad, Saysan, Tehran, Qazvin, and Yazd. (See the article "Baháʼí Emphasis on the Education of Girls in Iran"; and p. 18 of the 2005 Baháʼí International Community booklet Closed Doors: Iran's Campaign to Deny Higher Education to Baháʼís.) for girls and boys, operated by Baháʼís but open to all irrespective of religious background; banning Baháʼí literature; arbitrarily demoting, firing, or denying pensions for Baháʼís in public service who refused to deny their faith; and not allowing the Baháʼí community freedom to hold religious endowments in its name.

The 1941 forced abdication of Reza Shah, and Mohammad Reza Shah's accession to the throne, was accompanied by a resurgence in influence of Shiite Muslim leaders. The period from 1941 to 1955 was characterized by growing relationships between the royal court and clerics, and physical danger for Baháʼís—with numerous instances of Baháʼís being expelled from their homes; plundering of Baháʼí property; burning of Baháʼí homes and places of work; and acts of murder as Baháʼís were used as scapegoats for various interactions among clerics, the government, and segments of the population. During this time many Islamic societies, most with anti-Baháʼí agendas, were formed in major cities of Iran. This period culminated in the anti-Baháʼí campaign of 1955 when the Shah allowed "nationwide broadcast of a series of incendiary sermons against the Baháʼís by a leading Shiite preacher in Tehran—apparently hoping to make the Baháʼís a scapegoat to deflect attention from unpopular government policies."

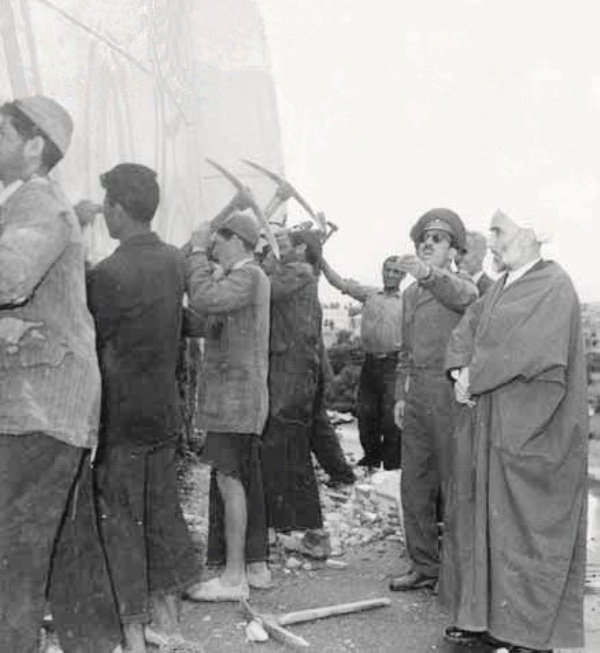
The anti-Baháʼí preacher with the Pahlavi government's military chief directing destruction of Iran's national Bahá'í Center's dome in 1955

With national and army radio stations put at his disposal, the preacher fueled a wave of anti-Baháʼí violence across the country; and the Pahlavi regime even assured parliament it had ordered the suppression of all activities of "the Baháʼí sect". Due to this cleric's provocations, the government confiscated Baháʼí properties in cities around the country. In Tehran, in front of foreign and domestic reporters with cameras, the cleric, accompanied by the Shah's army chief, proceeded to personally participate in demolishing the distinctive dome of Iran's national Baháʼí headquarters with pickaxes. As news spread abroad of how anti-Baháʼí propaganda was resulting in growing numbers of murders, rapes and robberies against members of the Baháʼí Faith, a chorus of international condemnation was raised against Iran for allowing such abuse of Baháʼís' human rights. This led the Shah, who was very conscious of such foreign criticism, to finally break with the clerics and rein in what was happening.

Absence of major violence, however, did not result in granting civil rights to Baháʼís. Members of the faith remained ineligible for employment in any government position, though implementation of this ban mostly depended on managers' attitudes in various places and times. Iran's Civil Employment Act of 1966 explicitly mentioned applicants for government jobs should have no prior convictions for "espousing corrupt beliefs", a calculated derogatory reference to Baháʼís. Belief in one of Iran's four official religions (Islam, Judaism, Christianity or Zoroastrianism) was invariably listed as an eligibility requirement in ads for governmental jobs—which meant Baha'is should not bother to apply. Though again depending on those in charge, some would accept for Baháʼís to leave the space for "religion" on employment forms blank. Throughout Mohammad Reza Shah's reign, Baháʼís were studiously ignored as a social group, though in very rare instances when they were "alluded to in mass media, they were called...the misguided sect", and even the most successful and prominent of Baháʼís could never be publicly identified as a member of the faith.

In the final two years of the Shah's reign, as his political problems increased, past patterns of persecution reappeared with the killing of individual Baháʼís, and polemics against Baháʼís as the "cause" of Iran's problems and the need for their "punishment" being raised in media. The latter resulted in sporadic mob attacks, raids, arson, and plundering against Baháʼís in various parts of the country. The short Pahlavi dynasty, and thousands of years of monarchy in Iran, ended when the Iranian Revolution resulted in the complete collapse of Mohammad Reza Pahlavi's rule on 11 February 1979. Following a national referendum, Iran became an Islamic republic on 1 April 1979.

== After the Islamic Revolution ==
The persecution of Baháʼís in Iran intensified greatly following the 1979 Islamic revolution. The regime that took power essentially does not allow members of the Baháʼí Faith, "even in theory, to exercise freely their religion and to exist and function as an organized religious community." When the new Islamic republic's constitution was drawn up in April 1979, certain rights for Christian, Jewish and Zoroastrian minorities in Iran were specifically mentioned and protected. Ominously, no mention whatsoever was made of the Baháʼí community, Iran's largest religious minority. Under Iran's brand of Islamic ideology, this lack of constitutional protection, in conjunction with unmitigated religious prejudice, has meant Baháʼís effectively have no rights of any sort, and can be attacked and persecuted in Iran without consequences for perpetrators. Government agencies and courts routinely deny Baháʼís the right of redress or protection against assault, killings or other forms of persecution—going so far as to rule that citizens who kill or injure Baháʼís are not even liable for damages because their victims are "unprotected infidels." The "International Religious Freedom Report" of 26 October 2009 by the U.S. Department of State's Bureau of Democracy, Human Rights, and Labor documents that "According to law, Baháʼí blood is considered mobah, meaning it can be spilled with impunity."

As a consequence, Iran's Islamic regime fundamentally denies Baháʼís virtually all citizenship and human rights in the land of their birth. By recognizing other religious minorities in its constitution, but not Baháʼís who are the country's largest religious group after Islam, the regime claims Baháʼís are not a religious group and therefore no reason exists to protect them. Stating Baháʼís are not members of a religion allows the government to then describe them in any way they wish—and to thus create any excuse for arresting, torturing, and executing Baháʼís and their leaders; banning Baháʼí administrative structures; erasing traces of their history and culture by destroying or confiscating Baháʼí sacred sites, religious monuments, and cemeteries; dispossessing Baháʼí individuals, communities, and institutions of their property; forbidding Baháʼís the right to peacefully and freely assemble, even in small groups, for worship, the spiritual training of their children and youth, study of their faith, or to otherwise live their social and cultural beliefs; undermining their intellectual advancement by denying educational rights of Baháʼí children and youth; and seeking to impoverish Baháʼís economically by dismissing them from employment, canceling earned pension payments, and targeting those who open small shops and businesses for harassment, irrational fines, and closure to disrupt their ability to earn a livelihood to sustain their families.

Although instances and levels of repression against Baháʼís have fluctuated—likely due to domestic political shifts and external pressures—since an initial deadly outburst in the first decade after Iran's Islamic revolution, "the clerical establishment's ideological hostility towards" the Baháʼí Faith remains constant. The second Supreme Leader of Iran, Ayatollah Seyyed Ali Khamenei, has been closely associated with anti-Baháʼí campaigns. The 1991 "Baháʼí Question" memorandum signed by him provides clear insight into Khamenei's thinking regarding Baháʼís, stating his intention "to exclude Baháʼís from mainstream Iranian life, block the development of their faith, and perhaps most sinister of all, to even 'destroy' their cultural roots outside the country."

=== Executions and imprisonment of leaders ===
In a concerted effort to destroy the Baháʼí community of Iran, almost immediately after coming to power, the Islamic regime began to kidnap and kill Baháʼís, especially those serving at national and local levels of the community. Because the Baháʼí Faith has no clergy, (Note: Baháʼís do not have any form of clergy, their affairs everywhere in the world are coordinated by believers voluntarily serving on national and local consultative councils, known as "spiritual assemblies", whose nine members are annually elected by secret ballot, without any nominations or reference to individuals, for one-year terms of service.) members organize themselves in an administrative system of "annually elected governing councils that operate at the national, regional, and local levels as well as individuals and groups who are formally appointed to assist with various aspects of the community's work and needs." It was these leaders voluntarily serving the Baháʼí community that Iran's government targeted. (Note: The first to be executed was Alí-Akbar Khursandí, a member of Tehran's local Baháʼí council member who was hanged on 12 April 1979. His execution was followed by the killing of seven other prominent members of the city's Baháʼí community between May and December of 1980: Ghulám-Husayn A'zamí, Alí-Akbar Mu'íní, Badí'u'lláh Yazdání, Yúsif Subhání, Yadu'lláh Mahbubíyán, Dhabíhu'lláh Mu'miní, and Bihrúz Saná'í. (IHRDC 2006, p. 27) The first nationally known victim was Prof. Ali Murad Davudi, then serving as secretary-general of Iran's national Baháʼí council, who was kidnapped in November 1979 and never seen again.)

==== Arrest and disappearance of the first national Baháʼí council ====
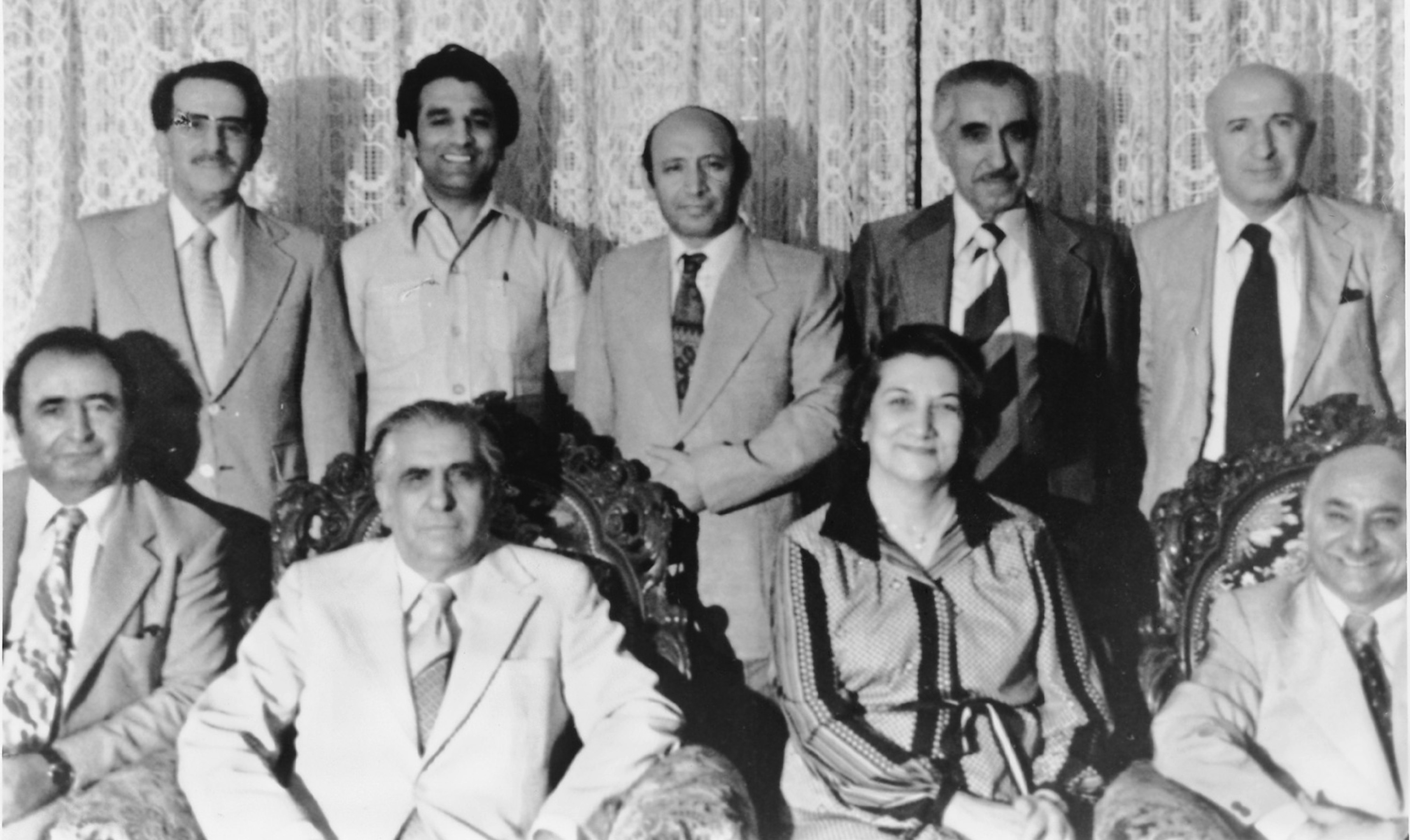
Members of the National Spiritual Assembly of the Baháʼís of Iran who disappeared in August 1980. All are presumed to have been executed.

Individual members of Iran's national Baháʼí administrative council (known as that community's National Spiritual Assembly) were harassed throughout 1980. On 21 August 1980 while meeting in a private home all nine council members then serving, along with two members of an appointed Baháʼí institution (known as an Auxiliary Board) whom they were consulting with, were summarily arrested by Revolutionary Guardsmen. (Note: The national council members were Mr. 'Abdu'l Husayn Taslímí, Mr. Húshang Mahmúdí, Mr. Ibráhím Rahmání, Dr. Husayn Nají, Mr. Manúhir Qá'im-Maqámí, Mr. 'Atá'u'lláh Muqarrabí, Mr. Yúsif Qádimí, Mrs. Bahíyyih Nádirí, Dr. Kámbíz Sádiqzádih. The two Auxiliary Board members were Dr. Yúsif 'Abbásíyán and Dr. Hishmat'ulláh Rawhání. (The Baháʼí World, vol. 18, pp. 257, 258. Haifa, Israel: Baháʼí World Centre, 1986.)) Families of those arrested tirelessly sought information on their loved ones, meeting with various top government officials until the end of January 1981. One official initially confirmed an arrest order had been issued for the eleven Baháʼís, but said access to them was denied while they were being interrogated. A month later that official contradicted himself by saying none of them had been arrested by the government. The fate of the nine National Spiritual Assembly and two Auxiliary Board members remains unknown, and their disappearance unexplained. It is presumed all were executed by the government, because that is what the Islamic regime did to their elected successors.

==== Arrest and execution of the second national Baháʼí council ====
Soon after their national council members were abducted, Iranian Baháʼís gathered to elect a new National Spiritual Assembly. Because of what happened to their predecessors, members of this second national Baháʼí council were fully aware of the risks they faced from the government. Iranian authorities promptly targeted the new Baháʼí leadership: On 13 December 1981, Revolutionary Guards arrested eight of the nine new national council members meeting in the private home of a Baháʼí. (Note: The eight arrested were Mr. Mihdí Amín Amín, Mr. Jalál 'Azízí, Dr. 'Izzatu'lláh Furúhí, Mrs. Zhínús Mahmúdí, Mr. Mahmúd Majdhúb, Mr. Qudratu'lláh Rawhání, Dr. Sírús Rawshání, and Mr. Kámrán Samímí. The council's ninth member, Mrs. Gití Qadímí Vahíd, was not present as she was undergoing surgery; she was later able to escape Iran. (IHRDC 2006, p. 24)) Without trial, all eight were executed on 27 December 1981. The head of Iran's judiciary, after an initial denial, finally stated these eight Baháʼís had been executed for "espionage for the benefit of foreign powers." A month later the head of the Central Revolutionary Courts sought to justify the execution of these innocents by saying being a Baháʼí "was synonymous with spying for a foreign power".

==== Banning, arrest, and execution of the third national Baháʼí council ====
Mentioning vague oft-repeated but demonstrably false accusations that Baháʼís were agitators, saboteurs against the government, blasphemers, leading Muslims astray, and spies (supposedly for Israel and/or colonial powers), but not providing a shred of evidence, on 29 August 1983 the Attorney-General of the Revolution announced a legal ban on all administrative and community activities of the Baháʼí community in Iran. Before complying with the ban, this third national Baháʼí council—formed following the execution of its predecessors—released an open letter refuting the government's allegations. Delivered to some 2,000 government officials and prominent Iranians, the letter detailed abuses faced by Baháʼís in the Islamic Republic, and appealed to Iran's people and to the Islamic government to restore their rights as citizens and as human beings. In part the national Baháʼí council's letter called on the Iranian regime:

...to end the persecution, arrest, torture, and imprisonment of Baháʼís "for imaginary crimes and on baseless pretexts, because God knows—and so do the authorities—that the only 'crime' of which these innocent ones are guilty is that of their beliefs… ." Emphasizing the implausibility of the espionage allegations, the letter asked: "What kind of spy is an 85-year-old man from Yazd who has never set foot outside his village? … How could students, housewives, innocent young girls, and old men and women… be spies? How could [village farmers] be spies? What secret intelligence documents have been found in their possession? What espionage equipment has come to hand? What 'spying' activities were engaged in by the primary school children who have been expelled from their schools?" The letter further emphasized that "spying is an element of politics, while non-interference in politics is an established principle of the Baháʼí Faith." Responding to the accusation that Baháʼís had been "hoarding" spare automobile parts, the NSA objected: "[i]f the Prosecutor chooses to label the Baháʼí administration as a network of espionage, let him at least consider it intelligent enough not to plan the overthrow of such a strong regime by hoarding a few spare parts!" The letter also drew attention to the fact that while Muslims were praised for sending money abroad (e.g. to Iraq and Jerusalem) for the upkeep of religious shrines, when a Baháʼí did the same, it was considered "an unforgivable sin and... proof that he has done so in order to strengthen other countries [particularly Israel]."

This letter was the final act of this national Baháʼí council's membership before they voluntarily disbanded themselves and an estimated 400 local Baháʼí councils around the country. (Note: Wherever they reside Bahá'ís obey their government in administrative matters, "but do not accept that it has a right to dictate to its citizens their beliefs.") Despite the dissolution of all Baháʼí administrative institutions in Iran, authorities continued to harass and intimidate former members of this national Baháʼí council, former members of disbanded local Baháʼí councils, and other former Baháʼí leaders around the country; along with everyone who signed the open letter defending the Baháʼí community. "Between late 1983 and early 1984 over 500 Baháʼís—most of whom were former council members or related to former members—were arrested without charge." Seven former members of the third National Baháʼí Spiritual Assembly of Iran were arrested, imprisoned, tortured, and finally executed by the Iranian government between May 1984 and September 1987. (Note: These were Ardishír Akhtarí, Farhád Asdaqí, Ahmad Bashiri, Farid Bihmardi, Jahángír Hidáyatí, Shápúr (Húshang) Markazí, and Amír-Husayn Nádirí. (IHRDC 2006, pp. 34–35)) The government placed the bodies of these seven national council members in the "infidels" section of an old Tehran cemetery. Some of their families reported they were not able to learn the location of their loved ones' bodies until they paid authorities for the cost of the bullets used to execute them.

The Iran Human Rights Documentation Center, an independent non-profit organization founded in 2004 by human rights scholars and lawyers, concludes "that the Revolutionary Courts and other agencies of the Islamic Republic pursued a deliberate strategy designed both to deprive the Baháʼí community of leadership and to criminalize an entire faith. The widespread and systematic nature of the persecution of the Iranian Baháʼís strongly suggests coordinated action and the public statements of senior members of the Iranian regime serve only to further reinforce this impression."

==== Torture and execution of prominent Baháʼís and members of local Baháʼí councils ====
Besides targeting Iran's national level Baháʼí leadership, the Islamic regime also pursued Baháʼís known for services to their religion, and members of local Baháʼí councils all over Iran. The first local Baháʼí council member to be executed, who served in Tehran, was hanged on 12 April 1979—just days after the official declaration of the Islamic Republic. Seeking to actively disenfranchise Baháʼís and to destroy the spirit of their communities, the Islamic regime arrested, imprisoned, tortured and/or executed prominent Baháʼís and those serving in leadership positions around the country. In Tehran, in Karaj, in Yazd, in Tabriz, in Hamadan, in Shiraz, (Note: Among the many executed for being Baháʼís in Shiraz were ten women—most in their twenties, the youngest a 17-year-old. (See: "The Story of Mona" & the Iran Press Watch article "36 Years On: The Baha'i Teenager Executed for Educating".) Hanged as a group one after the other on 18 June 1983, these women were deemed worthy of death for the crime of "misleading children", a charge based on their teaching regular morals classes for Baháʼí children, the equivalent of being "Sunday school" teachers in the West. (See: "Hanged for teaching 'Sunday school'" & the Iran Press Watch article "They Gave up Their Lives Rather than Give up Their Faith".) For more on the persecution of Baháʼís in Shiraz also see "Community-Under-Siege, The Ordeal of the Baháʼís of Shiraz", IHRDC, September 2007.) and in scores of smaller cities, towns, and villages, year after year the lives of Baháʼís in every part of Iran have been severely impacted by the Islamic regime's non-stop efforts over four decades to eradicate the Baháʼí Faith in the land of its origin.

Since the 1979 establishment of the Islamic regime in Iran well over 200 Baháʼís have been murdered, or have disappeared at the hands of authorities. In addition to those killed, hundreds more have been tortured or imprisoned. Vehement condemnation by numerous foreign governments, prominent individuals and groups worldwide in response to Iran's brutal killing of Baháʼís—particularly the government's 1983 execution of ten women in Shiraz for teaching Baháʼí children's classes, and its repeated group executions of members of Baháʼí administrative bodies—appeared to result in a slow shift in the regime's strategy for eliminating Iran's Baháʼís. Yet even as numbers of Baháʼís brazenly killed appeared to lessen, the regime increased its efforts to stifle and strangle the cultural and social life of Iranian Baháʼís.

==== Routine dealings with the "Yaran" and then their abrupt imprisonment ====
When the Baháʼí administration was banned by Iran's government in 1983, several Baháʼís formed a group to informally serve the needs of the country's estimated 300,000 Baháʼís (Note: In 1919 John Esslemont reported hundreds of thousands or more in Iran (Smith (2004), Baháʼís in the West pp. 63-72). Supposed numbers of adherents before and after the revolution vary greatly by source, but because Baháʼís are targets of official animus in Iran and their administration is banned their up-to-date information is not made public. Since Iran's Islamic revolution, both official Baháʼí sources and others commonly place the number of adherents there at about 300,000.) on an ad hoc basis. "This arrangement was made with the full knowledge of the Iranian government, which had routine dealings with them from 1983" until early 2008 when the seven then serving in this way were suddenly arrested by the government. This happened in spite of the fact that, as a signatory to Article 18 of the International Convention on Civil and Political Rights, Iran is legally bound to uphold every person's human right "to have or to adopt a religion or belief of [one's] choice," and "to manifest [one's] religion or belief in worship, observance, practice and teaching." Yet by declaring as illegal even this informal arrangement for seeing to the needs of Iran's largest non-Muslim religious minority, the government clearly sought to "debar Baháʼís from practicing any of the communal events associated with the worship and practice of [their] religion, including marriages, funerals, and other basic elements among the adherents of any religion." Known collectively among Baháʼís as the "Yaran" (meaning "the Friends"), the seven in this ad hoc fellowship coordinated Baha'i community activities relating to "the education of children and youth, opportunities to study and learn about family life, the advancement of women, upholding high personal moral standards, freeing themselves and their communities from prejudice" and "the inculcation of a spirit of service to humanity." The seven Yaran arrested (Note: Mrs. Fariba Kamalabadi, Mr. Jamaloddin Khanjani, Mr. Afif Naeimi, Mr. Saeid Rezaie, Mrs. Mahvash Sabet, Mr. Behrouz Tavakkoli, and Mr. Vahid Tizfahm.) were held for nine months before any charges were made, "and even then it was at a press conference, not in a court setting." The spurious accusations against them were "forming or managing a group that aims at disturbing national security"; "spreading propaganda against the regime of the Islamic Republic of Iran"; "engaging in espionage"; "gathering classified information with the intention of disturbing national security or of making it available to others"; "collaborating with foreign governments hostile to Iran, by some of the accused having taken trips to a number of European countries, such as Turkey and Germany, and by meetings of some of the accused with Australian and Canadian ambassadors"; and for "having assembled for the purpose of conspiring to commit offences against national security by having attended conferences held at the Defenders of Human Rights Center. (Note: The Defenders of Human Rights Center was established in Tehran in 2002 to actively defend rights of women, political prisoners and minorities in Iran. Shirin Ebadi, 2003 Nobel Peace Prize laureate, was one of several noted Iranian lawyers who founded the organization. It was illegally closed down by the Iranian government in 2010.)"

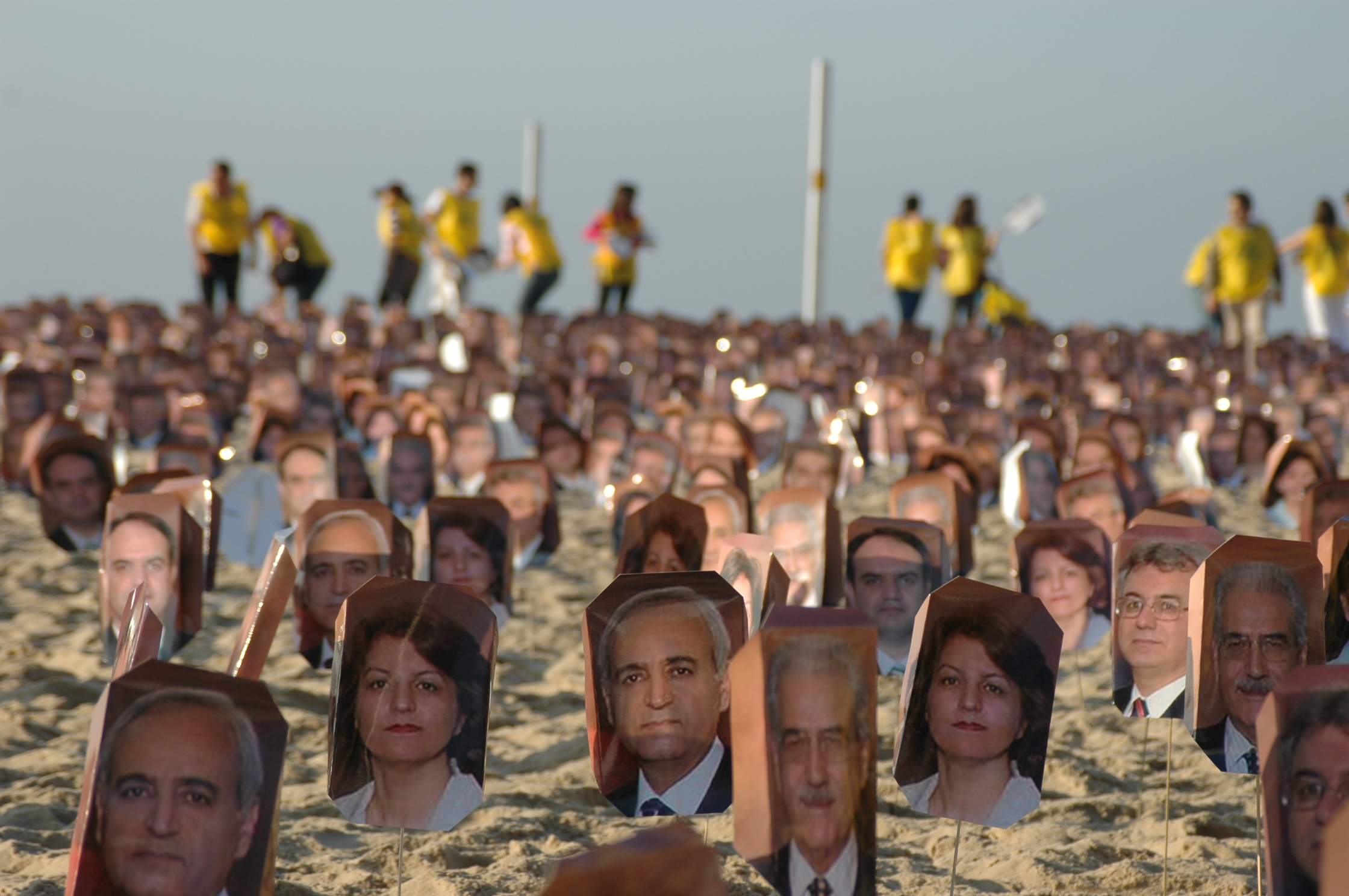
Almost 8,000 images of the 7 Yaran were displayed at a beach in Brazil as 800 human rights supporters gathered at the 2011 Rally in Rio for Religious Freedom which called on Iran to cease persecution of Bahá'ís and other religious minorities

In Iran detainees who have been charged have the supposed right to seek bail and to be released pending trial—yet despite numerous requests these Baháʼí leaders were consistently denied bail. The seven were also denied access to "lawyers for more than a year and then only allowed barely one hour of contact before their trial began." Finally their trial started on 12 January 2010, followed by two other court sessions in February and April 2010. Then on 7 August 2010, without presenting any evidence to prove the final charges, and despite the fact the Yaran had been serving their fellow believers' spiritual and social needs with the full knowledge and permission of the government for about 25 years, the Revolutionary Court in Tehran convicted all seven of "espionage for Israel", "insulting religious sanctities" and "propaganda against the system" and sentenced each of the seven to 20 years imprisonment. Amnesty International promptly called for their immediate release, describing the verdict as "a sad and damning manifestation of the deeply-rooted discrimination against Baháʼís by the Iranian authorities." In September 2010, an appeals court acquitted the Yaran of some charges, including espionage, and consequently reduced their sentences to 10 years. In March 2011, however, Iranian authorities reinstated the 20-year sentences.

In 2013 Iran adopted a new penal code. When terms of the new code were finally applied after much delay to the Yaran in November 2015, their sentences were again reduced from 20 to 10 years. Though the seven were also clearly eligible for immediate release at that time, considering other provisions of the new code regarding conditional release for those who had served at least half their sentences, it was never applied to the Baháʼís. On 18 September 2017 Mahvash Sabet, the first of the Yaran group to be arrested on 5 March 2008, was the first to be released after 10 years of unjust imprisonment. The six remaining former Yaran, who had each been arrested on 14 May 2008, were then slowly released over a period of more than a year; on 20 December 2018 Afif Naeimi was the last of the former Yaran group freed. Though these Baháʼís were finally out of prison, the daily pervasive grind of persecution against each of them and all their co-religionists in Iran continues unabated. The imprisonment of this group, particularly the story of Fariba Kamalabadi was the subject of Afghan-American filmmaker Misaq Kazimi's documentary.

=== Repression, denial of human rights, and efforts to eliminate ===
Numerous reports and statements of the United Nations and its various human rights bodies, of concerned national governments and their agencies, of many diverse non-governmental organizations and human rights groups, and of the Baháʼí International Community itself document in detail numerous instances and ways in which Iran's Islamic regime has persecuted and continues to torment members of the Baháʼí Faith in Iran. Specific instances are myriad and cannot be reviewed in an overview article; nevertheless several especially egregious areas of Iran's ongoing systematic persecution against members of the Baháʼí Faith in the country are mentioned below.

==== Cultural and social repression ====
In February 1979 the assets of two longstanding Baháʼí-owned companies were simultaneously seized: Nawnahálán, which began as a savings bank for Baháʼí children in 1917 and then grew with them to hold funds for an estimated 15,000 adults as well as local and national Baháʼí institutions; and Umaná, a legal holding company for some 1,000 Baháʼí communal properties and buildings including holy places associated with founders of the Baháʼí Faith; many Baháʼí cemeteries; a large hospital in Tehran caring for people of all religions and treating the poor at no cost; and facilities for Baháʼí meetings and worship. All assets and related legal documents for accounts and property deeds were confiscated, without any financial consideration for legal owners, and placed under government control. With Umaná's records in its possession the government was able to quickly and easily identify all sites of importance to Baháʼís in Iran.

In March and April 1979 the government began confiscating or destroying Baháʼí religious properties or monuments around Iran, the most important of which was the House of the Báb in Shiraz—the spot where the Báb first proclaimed his mission in 1844, and a revered place of pilgrimage for Baháʼís around the world. On 26 April 1979 the Baháʼís community of Shiraz was told by Revolutionary Guards that the property was being placed under supervision "in order to protect and prevent possible damage" to it. The regime's real intentions became clear on 1 September 1979 when demolition began on buildings surrounding the property; a week later authorities began destroying the House of the Báb itself. In 1981 the site was turned into a road and public square; and later a mosque was built on it. Since demolishing the House of the Báb, Iranian authorities have destroyed almost all Baháʼí holy places in Iran, including a house in Tehran where Baháʼu'lláh was born, and other important sites associated with Bábí-Baháʼí history. Destruction of these sites have sometimes been followed by construction of mosques in their place as deliberate acts of triumphalism.

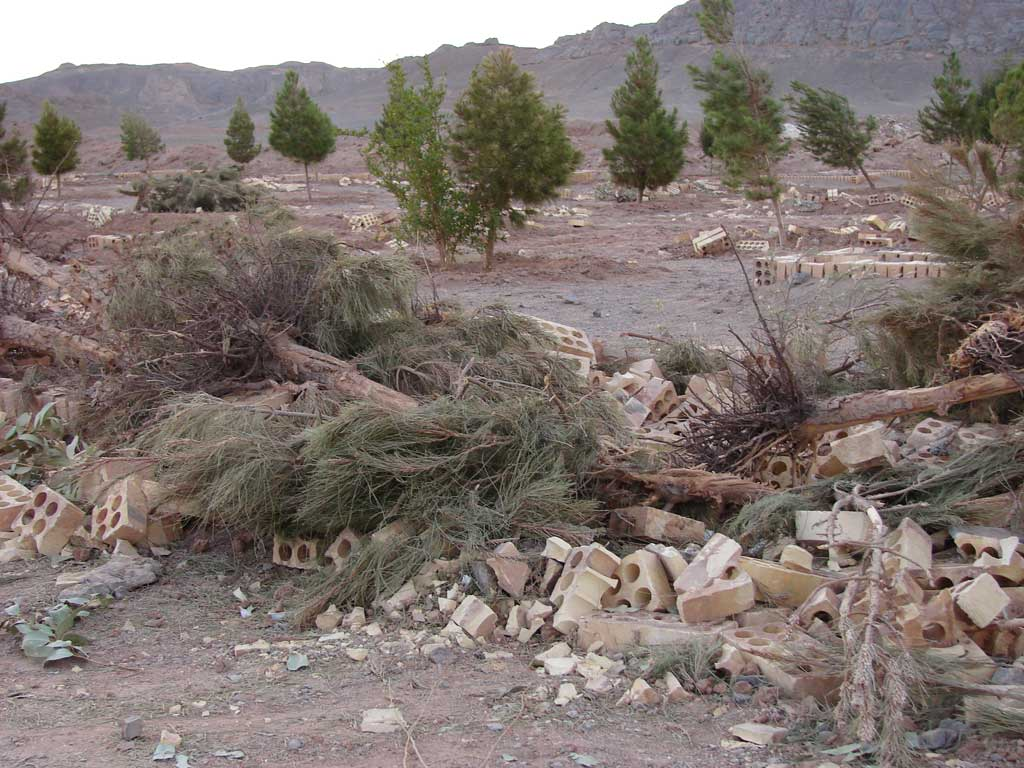
Baháʼí cemetery in Yazd after desecration by Iranian government

Another means of stripping Baháʼís of their cultural identity, and erasing ties to their heritage as a whole, has involved Baháʼí cemeteries around the country being methodically befouled, desecrated or destroyed through vandalism and destruction of facilities, with tombstones smashed, and corpses exhumed or left exposed. Prior to its destruction and the bulldozing of more than 15,000 graves, Tehran's Baháʼí cemetery was noted for being one of the most beautiful places in the capital. When Queen Elizabeth II visited Iran during the time of the late Shah, her itinerary included "a guided tour to this place to show her its beauty and to a Baháʼí [operated] hospital to demonstrate the type of [world class] medical service rendered to Iranians." The Islamic government does not allow Baháʼís to be buried in Muslim cemeteries because they are considered 'unclean' infidels. When they are allowed to secure a spot to bury their dead, cemetery officials often disallow Baháʼís their rights for burial according to Baháʼí religious laws. When authorities bury Baháʼís themselves, their families are usually only informed where their loved ones are after burials have taken place. Since August 2005, at least 83 attacks have taken place against Baháʼí cemeteries across Iran—destroying graves and causing extensive damage. No individuals or groups responsible have ever been punished.

Official Iranian policy against its Baháʼí citizens was disclosed by the UN Special Representative on the Human Rights Situation in the Islamic Republic of Iran in 1993 when it obtained a secret 1991 government memorandum. Produced by Iran's Supreme Revolutionary Cultural Council and personally approved by the Supreme Leader, Ali Khamenei, this document—stamped "confidential"—is direct evidence that what was happening to Baháʼís in Iran was being directed at the highest levels of the government. Entitled "The Baháʼí Question", it details precise strategies and instructions, and states the "government's dealings with [Baháʼís] must be in such a way that their progress and development are blocked". It seeks to "Deny them any position of influence, such as in the educational sector, etc."; and indicates the regime aims to keep Baháʼís "illiterate and uneducated, living only at a subsistence level" through a series of repressive measures restricting the educational, economic, and cultural life of Iranian Baháʼís. The plan it stipulates was "quietly implemented, even as the government of President Mohammad Khatami projected an image of moderation around the world."

This memorandum remains in effect today. Through random home raids, unlawful arrests, arbitrary detentions, and violations of due process by agencies of the Iranian government, members of the Baháʼí Faith are constantly victims of efforts to repress and intimidate them. Nowhere in Iran are Baháʼís ever free to practice their religion without harassment. Simple prayer gatherings, religious meetings, or efforts to serve others are forbidden. Since the 2013 election of Hassan Rouhani to Iran's presidency, at least 498 arrests of Baháʼís and 95 summons to prison have been documented. In the year leading up to August 2020 alone there have been at least 66 arrests. Since the start of the COVID-19 pandemic, courts have been increasingly handing down lengthy sentences for spurious charges made against Baháʼís, putting their lives at serious risk in the country's overcrowded prison system.

==== Denial of the right to education ====
The denial of the right to higher education is a tool wielded by the Iranian government on many whose ideology contradicts or threatens the authority of the ruling clerics; however, the Baháʼís are the only group to face pervasive group denial of this right. The efforts of the Iranian government to deny Baháʼís the right to education is seen as part of its coordinated efforts to eradicate the Baháʼí community as a viable component of Iranian society.

Shortly after the Iranian revolution in 1979, large numbers of Baháʼí students, ranging across the entire educational system from primary through secondary and university level, were expelled from schools and blocked from continuing their education. Similarly, Baháʼí professors and faculty members were dismissed from all universities and academic institutions in the country. In the 1980s, partly in response to international pressure, primary and secondary school children were allowed to re-enroll. However, up to the present the government has maintained the ban on the entry of Baháʼí youth into public and private colleges and universities. The official decree barring Baháʼí students from admission to public universities was issued in 1981. That year universities established a new admissions system in which only individuals who identified themselves with one of the four religions recognized by the constitution of the Islamic regime were admitted. The systemic nature of the government's prejudicial policy was made very clear in a top-level 1991 private memorandum prepared by the Iranian Revolutionary Council and approved by Ayatollah Khamenei which states "The Government's dealings with [the Baháʼís] must be in such a way that their progress and development are blocked. ... They can be enrolled in schools provided they have not identified themselves as Baháʼís. ... Preferably they should be enrolled in schools which have a strong and imposing religious ideology. ... They must be expelled from universities, either in the admission process or during the course of their studies, once it becomes known that they are Baháʼís."

For the Iranian government to say, as they have, that if Baháʼís identify themselves as Muslims on their entrance exams they would be allowed to enroll is disingenuous, as it is well known that as a matter of religious principle Baháʼís refuse to dissimulate their beliefs. Confirming these findings, an investigation by the international organization Committee of Concerned Scientists found that university officials in Iran had "received orders from above not to score the tests of Baháʼí students," or that these officials had suggested that a student would receive his test scores only if the student's family renounced their faith. The Committee called for "the complete publication of all test scores without discrimination."

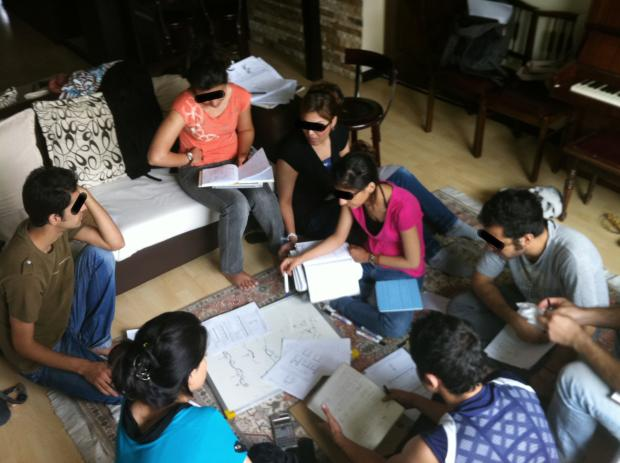
BIHE students pursue education in a living room

In response to the government's campaign to totally deny their youth access to higher education, the Baháʼí community of Iran established the Baháʼí Institute for Higher Education (BIHE) in 1987; it has been described both as "an elaborate act of communal self-preservation", and as "the fundamental definition of constructive resilience." Despite numerous arrests, periodic raids, several imprisonments of those involved, mass confiscation of school equipment and general harassment, BIHE has continued and even expanded its operations. BIHE has received much praise for offering a non-violent, creative, and constructive response to ongoing oppression. As a unique, highly decentralized, open university BIHE utilizes an all-volunteer unpaid faculty, many of whom were fired as professors from Iranian universities when Baháʼís were steadily purged from positions in government-operated institutions. (Note: Details of BIHE's founding and operations are detailed in "The Baháʼí Institute Of Higher Education: A Creative And Peaceful Response To Religious Persecution In Iran", a Baháʼí International Community written statement to the 55th Session of the UN Commission on Human Rights under Agenda item 10 of the provisional agenda: The Right to Education. Circulated as UN Document # E/CN.4/1999/NGO/13. (BIC Document #: 99-0401, Geneva, 1 April 1999; see https://www.bic.org/statements/bahai-institute-higher-education-creative-and-peaceful-response-religious-persecution-iran).) In Iran BIHE currently "has five faculties with 5 associate programs, 18 undergraduate degree programs and 14 graduate programs", offering more than 1050 courses in the arts and sciences. With almost a thousand faculty and administrative staff, BIHE now accepts about 450 students into its first year programs. All applicants "conform to the same rigorous academic standards as other students in Iran", and "must pass the national entrance exam, and meet all the BIHE academic requirements". BIHE's high standards have earned it an internationally recognized reputation for academic quality, attested to by the fact its graduates "have been accepted at more than 100 different university graduate programs outside of Iran", many recognized as being among the world's finest.

Since its inception, BIHE's online component has attracted growing numbers of volunteer professors outside of Iran; known as its "Affiliated Global Faculty" (AGF), these volunteers work with colleagues inside Iran to "assist with the development, implementation and instruction of the BIHE courses". AGF professors holding PhD-level degrees reside in Africa, Asia, Australia, Europe, Latin America, and North America; this diversity of teaching staff is "one of the unique and impressive features" of BIHE. In addition to teaching, AGF assist BIHE as researchers and consultants. After four decades, the government of Iran continues to harass, arrest, and imprison Baháʼís associated with endeavors of the Baháʼí Faith to educate its youth in Iran. Though Iran's constitution describes access to education as a fundamental right of its citizens, and the Universal Declaration of Human Rights and the UN's International Covenant on Economic, Social and Cultural Rights have both been ratified by Iran's government, the country continues to overtly and covertly deny Baháʼís their educational rights.

==== Economic persecution ====
Since its establishment the Islamic regime has systematically sought to deny Baháʼís the right to work and employment, in direct contravention of Article 23.1 of the Universal Declaration of Human Rights and Part III and Article 6 of the International Covenant on Economic, Social and Cultural Rights. Soon after the Islamic revolution, the central government issued circulars throughout Iran stating Baháʼís were to be removed from all civil service positions unless they became Muslims. On 30 June 1980 an edict was published declaring payments from the National Treasury to Baháʼís had been declared haram (prohibited as a matter of religious faith), thereafter retired Baháʼís who had been receiving pension payments lost them. The disenfranchisement of Baháʼís in public employment continued unabated; by 1987 "over 11,000 Baháʼí government employees had lost their jobs as a result of the anti-Baháʼí legislation."

In 1980 Iranian Revolutionary Courts began empowering local authorities to confiscate property privately held by individual Baháʼís. In some cases individuals whose property had been seized were allowed to use it until they died, but upon death only a Muslim family member could inherit it. "If no Muslim relative could be found, the property automatically transferred to the ownership of Imam Khomeini's Charitable Organization." (Note: Regarding denying Baháʼís the right to inherit, also see: "Discrimination against Religious Minorities in Iran", an August 2003 report by the Paris-based International Federation for Human Rights (FIDH), p. 14.) Since 2006, various trade associations, unions, and business groups have been asked to compile lists of Baháʼís in every type of employment under their purview. In many cities authorities systematically seal Baháʼí-owned shops on the flimsiest of excuses. Official documents again prove such abuse is not isolated or arbitrary, but rather a matter of established government policy. A 9 April 2007 letter from Tehran's Public Places Supervision Office confirms orders to police commanders and heads of intelligence and security throughout the province saying "members of the 'perverse Bahaist sect' must be prevented from engaging in certain occupations. The letter stipulates that Baháʼís must be denied work permits and licenses for over 25 kinds of specifically-listed businesses and are barred from any other 'high-earning businesses'."

In hundreds of cases, authorities have taken measures making it extremely difficult for Baháʼís to earn a simple living. "Incidents include arbitrary shop closures, unjust dismissals, the actual or threatened revocation of business licenses, and other actions to suppress the economic activity of Baháʼís." One UN Special Rapporteur investigating human rights issues in Iran reported in 2016 that he "continues to receive troubling reports that the authorities continue to pursue activities that deprive Baháʼís of their right to work, reportedly in line with a directive issued by the Supreme Council of the Cultural Revolution in 1991. These policies restrict the types of businesses and jobs Baháʼí citizens can have, support the closing of Baháʼí-owned businesses, place pressure on business owners to dismiss Baháʼí employees and call for seizure of their businesses and property."

Since President Rouhani came to power in 2013, at least 1080 incidents of economic persecution or discrimination have been documented, 31 incidents happened in the year leading up to August 2020. One instance is the 4 November 2019 decision of the Special Court for Article 49 of the Constitution to "confiscate all of the properties belonging to Baháʼís in the Village of Ivel"—properties that have been in the possession of Baháʼís since the mid-1800s.

==== Incitement to hatred ====
For decades, efforts by the Islamic regime to incite hatred, distrust, intolerance, and violence against Baháʼís have steadily increased. Some officials and clergy openly encourage persecution of Baháʼís. As part of an institutionalized incitement to hatred, "National and provincial budgets have included allocations for 'educational' programs to 'confront' the Baháʼí Faith, and official organs have been established and dedicated to that purpose." Material from these efforts "present a wide range of completely false allegations. Incitement to hatred against the Baháʼís has long been a mainstay of campaigns by the government to promote religious orthodoxy." As a result, Baháʼís in communities across Iran "receive threatening telephone calls, text messages, and anonymous letters, and they encounter anti-Baháʼí pamphlets in shops, schools, and other public places. In many localities, graffiti is spray-painted in and on Baháʼí cemeteries, houses, shops, orchards, and vehicles. Without fail, these secondary sources of slander contain the very same malicious lies and incendiary language found in media affiliated with and controlled and sanctioned by the government".

In the year leading up to August 2020, more than 9,511 articles, videos, or web pages "appearing in government-controlled or government-sponsored media" have featured anti-Baháʼí propaganda. In all cases, the dissemination was sponsored and/or approved by the State. "Since August 2016, hundreds of influential figures, including clerics, religious figures, academics, editors, and government representatives have publicly issued speeches, articles, or written declarations against the Baháʼís" which have been published on "websites of various media organizations affiliated with the Iranian government". Because the government denies Baháʼís access to ways to communicate with the public in Iran, they are unable to counter the lies and misinformation being propagated against them and their faith. On 26 March 2018, Iran's Supreme Leader Ali Khamenei issued on his website a new religious decree (fatwa) regarding "association and dealing with Baháʼís", stating "[y]ou should avoid any association and dealings with this perverse and misguided sect."

== Responses to the persecution of Iran's Baháʼís ==
=== International support for Iran's Baháʼís ===
Not long after the Islamic regime's 1979 destruction of the House of the Báb, followed by its August 1980 abduction and murder of all nine members of the national Baháʼí council then serving in post-revolutionary Iran, many foreign government bodies, human rights groups, and prominent individuals worldwide began condemning Iran's persecution of Baháʼís and their faith in that country. On 10 September 1980 the Sub-Commission on the Prevention of Discrimination and Protection of Minorities expressed "profound concern" over the persecution of Baháʼís in Iran, the first such resolution ever by a body of the United Nations.

Condemnation of all aspects of Iran's pervasive and unrelenting persecution of its Baháʼí community has been widespread, global, and continuous since 1979. The United Nations General Assembly and various UN bodies, the European Parliament, both houses of the US Congress, heads of state, and parliamentarians and representatives serving numerous other nations have made clear their condmenation of the government of Iran's actions towards its Baháʼí citizens. Over the years increasing numbers of Iranians both within and outside Iran have added their voices to denounce the persecution. In November 2018 a group of Iranian Muslim intellectuals condemned the "systematic and deeply rooted violation of Baháʼí citizens' rights" and described it as "being inhumane and contrary to religious and moral obligations."

According to the Baháʼí International Community, "At every turn during the...[last] four decades of systematic persecution against Baháʼís in Iran, the international response and outcry has been critical in preventing an escalation of violence."

=== Baháʼí response ===
In spite of the fact Baháʼís are Iran's only non-Muslim minority to accept Muhammad's divine station and to recognize the Quran's authenticity, they have been consistently denied the basic civil rights granted to other religious minority groups in the country. Since 1844 Baháʼí individuals and communities in Iran have been targeted by "recurrent waves of hostile propaganda and censorship, social ostracism and exclusion, denial of education, denial of employment, denial of due process before the law, property looting and destruction, government seizure of individual and collective assets, arson, incitements to mob violence, arbitrary arrests and imprisonments, physical and psychological torture, death threats, executions, and disappearances—all calculated to extinguish the community."

Beginning with the severe violence that characterized the religion's earliest years in the mid-nineteenth century, generations of Iran's Baháʼís have lived and suffered, under kings and clerics, "as an oppressed and vulnerable minority, experiencing recurrent episodes of violent persecution. These episodes have been driven by incitements from the pulpit as well as media propaganda reflecting a calculated effort to poison public sentiment toward the Baháʼís and to intimidate fair-minded and sympathetic Iranians who might be moved to come to their defense." Despite severe persecution over almost eighteen decades, the Baháʼís of Iran "have refused to adopt the culture of victimhood or to respond to their oppressors with hatred," instead they have invariably faced opposition with fortitude and "constructive resilience." In his writings Baháʼu'lláh encouraged and lauded such a response among early believers, thus inspiring those of later generations:

"Praise be to God that ye did not commit oppression whilst ye were oppressed, that ye wished not to injure anyone though ye were afflicted with grievous injury, that with the utmost compassion ye beseeched God's mercy for all people though ye witnessed the onslaught of cruelty, that ye yearned for freedom though ye were imprisoned." [He then counseled them:] "... never to forfeit this most exalted station, never to overstep the bounds of humaneness, and to leave the character and manners of the beasts and brutes to their like. ... Through your pure deeds and saintly character the lights of justice, which are veiled and hidden by the oppression of the tyrants, will most assuredly shine resplendent...".

Rather than "yielding to oppression, Baháʼís have bravely approached the very same officials who seek to persecute them," citing Islamic teachings when dealing with religious persecution and using "legal reasoning based on Iranian law and the country's constitution" when seeking their legitimate rights from government authorities. In Baháʼu'lláh's writings "empowerment", when in opposition to "oppression", implies "empowerment is itself the method for eradicating oppression. This empowerment flows from the realization and actualization of the inner power of the spirit; it cannot be attained by the sword or any form of coercion but only through spiritual awakening and consciousness." For Baháʼís, then, persecution is dealt with not by "anger or hatred against the oppressors but by universal love for all people and belief in the dignity and sacredness of the entire human race. From this perspective, one opposes injustice not to degrade the oppressor but rather to help restore the human dignity and rights of the oppressed as well as to help the oppressor overcome self-alienation, self-dehumanization, and self-oppression. Such an approach requires rejecting not only physical violence but also violence of language and sentiments."

A growing number of nations, human rights organizations, and people around the world have in recent years condemned the Iranian government for its continued systematic persecution of Baháʼís. In Iran itself, increasing numbers of individuals, "including intellectuals, journalists, activists, filmmakers, artists and a number of clerics", have voiced support for the rights of Baháʼís, recognizing that the situation of Baháʼís in that country "represents a litmus test of the condition of that society and its ability to safeguard the rights of every citizen." Likewise, "more and more, ordinary citizens are giving support to their Baháʼí friends and neighbors by patronizing their businesses or protesting their expulsion from schools."

Regardless of daily hardships and pressures faced in Iran, and efforts by the Iranian government that even encourage them to flee their homeland, many Baháʼís choose to stay—firmly believing it is their "responsibility to contribute to the progress and advancement of their homeland", even if in small ways in collaboration with their fellow citizens.

== Advancing Iran’s development ==
=== Consultation, reform, and social modernization ===
From the emergence of the Baháʼí community in nineteenth-century Iran, adherents sought to translate the teachings of Baháʼuʼlláh and ʻAbduʼl-Bahá into forms of social action that benefited the wider population. One expression of this orientation was the creation of consultative councils that prioritized shared deliberation over hierarchical authority. Such practices differed from the dominant patterns of governance and social organization in Qajar and early Pahlavi Iran and were associated with changing ideas about participation in public life. Instead of religious professionals or charismatic figures, Baháʼís promoted elected consultative bodies, later established as spiritual assemblies. These bodies emphasized consultation, accountability, and broad participation, providing an alternative to both Qajar autocracy and Shiʿi clerical hierarchy. These councils focused on local needs, including schooling, basic health measures, and social welfare. Their work reflected Baháʼí principles which emphasis cooperation, equality, and collective responsibility.

Scholars have also linked the Bábí and Bahá'í movements to broader processes of social and intellectual change in Iran, describing their influence as unfolding through gradual and nonviolent shifts in social norms, institutions, and patterns of community life from the late nineteenth century onward. Within this historical setting, Baháʼís have been identified as early advocates of constitutional and democratic ideas.

In matters of social change, Bahá'í teachings encouraged engagement with scientific learning and technological development, alongside a selective approach to Western modernity. This outlook rejected both isolationist traditionalism and the uncritical adoption of European models, and has been discussed as contributing to a locally grounded form of Iranian modernity shaped by religious concepts rather than imported ideological frameworks.

Bahá'ís also engaged with wider Iranian reform movements, especially constitutionalism, through individual involvement, intellectual exchange, and the circulation of reform-oriented texts such as ʻAbdu'l-Bahá's The Secret of Divine Civilization. These ideas contributed to discussions on reform whilst remaining outside political factionalism.

=== Gender equality and women's education ===
Advancing women's education was a recurring priority of early Baháʼí initiatives in Iran. Guided by Baháʼí teachings that affirm the equality of women and men, Baháʼís founded schools in multiple regions during the late nineteenth and early twentieth centuries. Among these were early modern schools for girls, including the Tarbiat School for girls, which offered formal education to students from varied social backgrounds at a time when such opportunities were not widely available. Bahá'í perspectives on education emphasized universal access, viewing the intellectual and social advancement of women as essential to wider social progress. These ideas were pursued through community efforts and educational programs and have been linked to reform agendas that gained prominence during and after the Constitutional Revolution.

From the early 1930s onward, Bahá'í women increasingly took part in both social and administrative activity. In 1944, the Society for the Advancement of Women (Anjoman-e Taraqqí-ye Nesván) was created to coordinate women's initiatives at a national level. The organization convened its first national gathering in Tehran in 1947. In subsequent years, regional meetings, educational sessions, and regular classes were organized, including programs intended to improve literacy among women.

Longer-term efforts—including a four-year program for Iranian Bahá'í women (1946–1950)—supported broader participation by women in community responsibilities, with Bahá'í women becoming eligible to serve on Spiritual Assemblies in 1954. By April 1973 illiteracy among Bahá'í women under forty years of age was reported as having been eliminated nationwide, and in the years leading up to 1979, Bahá'í women were participating widely in Bahá'í community activity.

Following the Islamic Revolution, Bahá'í women continued to take part in activities in both urban and rural settings. Many were imprisoned in connection with such efforts, and more than twenty were executed.

=== Health, welfare, and economic initiatives ===
Baháʼís in Iran undertook social initiatives which included clinics, hospitals, basic public health measures and improved bathing facilities intended to address hygiene and disease prevention.

Additional efforts included vocational programs such as nursing education and services for the elderly. In some areas, Baháʼís also contributed to economic life through entrepreneurship and by organizing initiatives such as postal networks and language instruction intended to support communication and intercultural contact. A charitable company founded in Tehran in 1907 supported educational and welfare activities, including assistance for teachers, children, orphans, older people, people with disabilities, and students, with support from Bahá'ís among its contributors. In 1917, a "Nonahalan" company was established in Qazvin which, by 1967, reportedly had about 9,000 shareholders and 1,700,000 dollars in assets.

In 1940 a Bahá'í resident of Tehran, `Abdu'l-Mithaq Mithaqiyyih, established a hospital which he donated to the Bahá'í community, its rapid development enabling it to secure not only the services of highly regarded doctors, but also the most up to date equipment. Early in the 1970s a nursing school associated with the hospital was established, with the hospital setting up medical clinics in Boyer-Ahmad.

An institution which was founded in 1940 for the care of Bahá'í orphans operated for many years, with another service initiative involving the building of modern bathhouses in many towns and villages to replace older facilities that were widely regarded as unhygienic. Whilst some new baths were constructed and given over to public use by individual Bahá’ís, others were funded and constructed with wider community participation.

=== Educational initiatives ===
In the Bahá'í Faith education is emphasized as being central to both spiritual growth and social development, which has been described as a major factor in the material and moral advancement of individuals and communities Bahá'í texts describe education as a means of developing human capacities and enabling individuals to contribute to society. Within this framework, parents are encouraged to educate their children, with particular attention to the education of daughters, and training is commonly understood to include moral formation alongside academic learning and practical skills.

One educational initiative associated with the Bahá'í community was the establishment of summer schools, a format that had developed earlier in the United States in 1927. In Iran, Bahá'í summer schools began in 1939, with the first held at Hajji-Abad. The program consisted of three sessions of ten days each, with a total of 214 Bahá'ís participating. Similar programs were held in subsequent years in Tehran and other provinces. A permanent site supported by the National Spiritual Assembly was established at Hadiqeh, on the slopes of the Alborz Mountains northeast of the capital, where annual attendance reached the hundreds.

From 1898, moral education classes were conducted in Tehran and other Bahá'í centers. In later years, greater attention was devoted to children's education within the Bahá'í community, and publications were produced for children in Iran.

==== Bahá'í schools ====
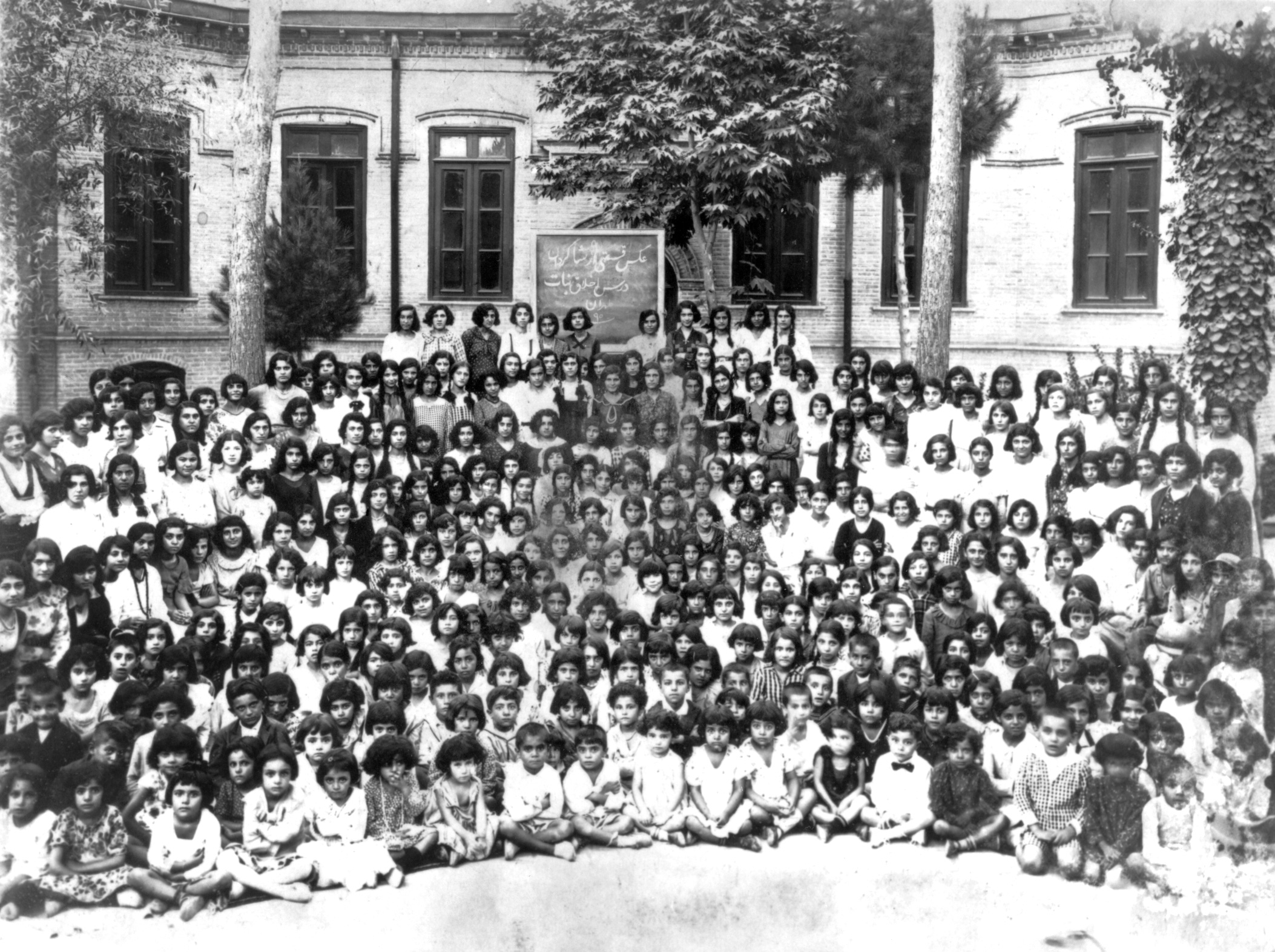
The Tarbiyat Bahá'í girls' school in Tehran

Bahá'í schools were institutions founded and administered by the Bahá'í community in Iran and Ashgabat. They were officially recognized by the government and operated in accordance with Bahá'í principles from 1897 to 1929 in Ashgabat and until 1934 in Iran.

Bahá'í teachings emphasize education in physical, intellectual, moral, and spiritual dimensions, with the importance of this subject being addressed in the writings of Bahá'u'lláh. The Bahá'í belief is that parents are responsible for the education of their children, with the community also having a role in supporting education. `Abdu'l-Bahá elaborated on these themes in his writings. Due to sustained persecution of the Bahá'í community, formal and consistent educational arrangements were limited until the late nineteenth century. Prior to 1897, elementary instruction was often provided privately in Bahá'í homes and focused on Persian and Arabic literature, history, and Bahá'í texts. Similar patterns of informal instruction existed in early Bahá'í communities in Russia, Turkmenistan, Burma, and different parts of Iran, including Najafabad near Isfahan.

In an effort to put Bahá’í principles of education into practice and in accordance with the guidance of ‘Abdu’l-Bahá, Bahá’ís in Iran gradually established more than thirty Bahá’í schools whenever circumstances permitted. These schools were founded throughout Iran, as well as in several locations in India, Egypt, Turkey, Palestine, and Russia. The first Bahá’í schools to be supported, administered, and financed by the Bahá’í community were established in Tehran and Ashgabat. Following their establishment, additional schools were founded in parts of Russia and Turkmenistan, including the Tavakkol School in Qazvin as well as other institutions such as the Ta’yid School and the Mahabbat School (for girls) in Hamadan. Further schools included Vahdat-e Bashar (Unity of Humankind) in Kashan, Ma‘rifat in Aran (near Kashan), Taraqqi in Shahmirzad (near Semnan), Mithaqiyya in Neyriz, and schools in Abadeh, Qomrud (near Kashan), Najafabad, Bahnemir (near Sari), Maryamabad and Mehdiabad (near Yazd), Barforush (present-day Babol), Sari, Boshruyeh (in Khorasan), and Eshtehard (near Karaj). Bahá’í schools were also established outside Iran, including in Tashkent, Merv, İskenderun (in Turkey), and Daidanaw (in Myanmar). Although founded by Bahá’ís, these schools were open to students from all backgrounds, including pupils from diverse religious communities—including Bahá’ís, Muslims, Zoroastrians, Jews, and Christians—studying together in these institutions.

The Tarbiyat School in Tehran, founded in 1897 by Haji Mirza Hasan Adib (1918–1919), received official recognition two years later. Among its early principals were Dr. Ata'u'llah Bakhshayesh (1944–1945) and Dr. Mohammad Monajjem (1920–1921), followed by Azizu'llah Mesbah (1945–1946) and Ali Akbar Forutan. Reports from 1911–1912 indicate that the school had 371 students across eight grade levels (in 11 classrooms), 18 teaching staff, and four personnel. By 1932 it offered six primary and four secondary levels, reportedly including students from several religious backgrounds among its enrollment.

A girls' Tarbiyat school was established in 1911–1912 as part of efforts to implement the principle of the education of girls. The school was founded by Dr. `Ata'u'llah Bakhshayesh with assistance from several American Bahá'ís, including Mrs. Lillian Kapps, Dr. Susan Moody, Dr. Genevieve Coy, and Mrs. Adelaide Sharp in cooperation with Iranian colleagues. It began with six grade levels and offered courses for girls up to the age of 20. By 1919–1920, enrollment had reportedly reached approximately 400 students, and in the following decade the school expanded further to offer additional grade levels serving Muslim, Bahá’í, and Jewish students.

An official order was issued by the Deputy Minister of Education in 1935, stating that the Tarbiyat school was no longer permitted to operate since it had closed on 15 December 1934, the day on which the martyrdom of the Báb had been commemorated. This resulted in the permanent closure of all Bahá’í schools throughout the country, despite all efforts by the Bahá’ís to have the decision reversed.

==== BIHE ====
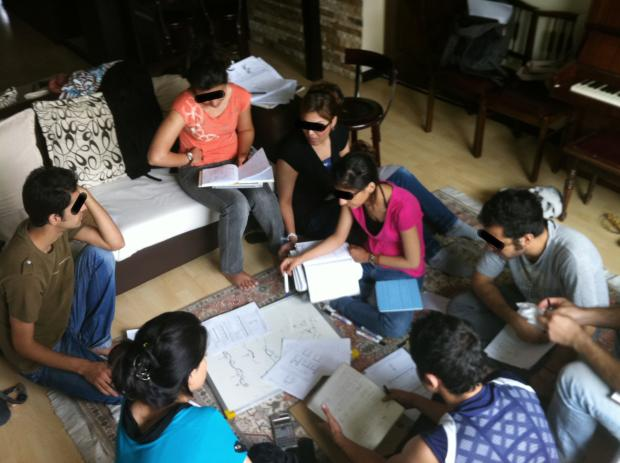
A photo of some students of the Bahá'í Institute for Higher Education.

Another educational initiative associated with the Iranian Bahá'í community was the creation of the Baháʼí Institute for Higher Education in 1987, which aimed to provide access to higher education for Bahá'ís who were excluded from universities. It has been described as a grassroots initiative enabling university-level study in a restrictive environment and has been discussed as an example of constructive and nonviolent forms of resilience through education.

Studies of the institute note that it provides a "social space" in which students and faculty can sustain academic activity and maintain professional ties under conditions of discrimination, and can put into practice concepts such as learning, service, and resilience supported by community sacrifice and international attention.

== Development of the Baháʼí Faith ==
=== Community organization and administrative order ===
Baháʼís in Iran helped in pioneering the Baháʼí administrative order, a community structure which doesn’t include clergy, but relies on elections and consultation instead. Early Iranian Baháʼís established consultative councils which developed into Local Spiritual Assemblies and later into national and international institutions.

These developments contributed to the wider evolution of the Baháʼí Faith's administrative system, which organizes community life and collective decision-making around consultation, justice, and shared responsibility.

=== Global spread and intellectual contributions ===
Iranian Baháʼís played an important role in shaping the institutional, ethical, and cultural foundations of the Baháʼí Faith, which later expanded internationally. A major element of this development was the refinement and practical application of the Baháʼí administrative order, including the shift from individual authority to elected collective leadership. This model was developed within Iranian Baháʼí communities and later adopted globally.

Iranian Baháʼís also contributed to the formation of Baháʼí religious culture, which rejects patriarchy, nationalism, clericalism, and concepts of ritual impurity (najāsat). These teachings encouraged social relations framed in more egalitarian terms and drew converts from Muslim, Jewish, and Zoroastrian communities. In addition, Iranian Baháʼís contributed to scholarly and interpretive work on Baháʼí teachings, including historical and theological writings that addressed the Faith's relationship with Islam, modernity, and global civilization. This scholarship helped connect the Faith's Iranian origins with its later international development.

Iranian Baháʼís engaged closely with the writings of Baháʼuʼlláh and ʻAbduʼl-Bahá and produced theological, historical and literary works which contributed to the Faith's intellectual heritage. Despite recurring persecution, the Baháʼí World News Service has characterized this experience as "constructive resilience," referring to ongoing commitment to service and community-building.

The Iranian Bahá'í community was also instrumental in contributing personnel and resources to the growth of Bahá'í communities outside Iran. In the early period, Bahá'ís from Iran played a leading role in the formation of Bahá'í communities in the Middle East and southern Russia. Over time, Iranian Bahá'ís also traveled and resettled in other regions to support the establishment and consolidation of Bahá'í community life. During the Ten Year Crusade (1953–1963) and later international plans, the Iranian Bahá'í community provided assistance through both financial contributions and volunteers. Between 1968 and 1973, as part of the international goals of the Nine Year Plan (1964–1973), 3,500 Iranian Bahá'ís reportedly settled voluntarily in various parts of Iran and in many countries worldwide.

=== Bahá'í pioneers ===
The term pioneer in the Bahá'í community refers to individuals who voluntarily relocate—either within their own country or internationally—with the aim of supporting Bahá'í community life and contributing to the social betterment of the places in which they settle. This form of service is connected to the Bahá'í principle that religious responsibilities are not carried out by clergy since the Bahá'í Faith has no clergy as a distinct class or occupation. Within this framework, individual believers are encouraged to assume personal responsibility for service to society and for the development of their communities.

In the earliest period of the Bábí and later Bahá'í movements, travel and resettlement were often undertaken to introduce the new religion and its teachings to other communities. The Báb instructed the first eighteen believers, known as the Letters of the Living, to scatter throughout Iran and neighboring countries in order to spread his message. Bahá'u'lláh likewise encouraged followers to travel within Iran and to other countries, including India, to present Bahá'í teachings among different populations and social groups. In many cases this took the form of short-term travel for teaching purposes. Accounts also indicate that ʻAbdu'l-Bahá urged believers to establish their residences in additional localities; for example, Turkish-speaking Bahá'ís from Azerbaijan were encouraged to settle in cities in Anatolia.

Between 1916 and 1917, ʻAbdu'l-Bahá addressed a series of letters to Bahá'ís in North America, later known as the Tablets of the Divine Plan, which identified regions of the world where settlement by Bahá'ís was encouraged.

During the first fifteen years of his leadership, Shoghi Effendi concentrated on consolidating Bahá'í administrative institutions. In 1937, he initiated systematic teaching plans based on ʻAbdu'l-Bahá's guidance in the Tablets of the Divine Plan and encouraged National Spiritual Assemblies to send individuals and families to places where they could help strengthen community life and contribute to social, spiritual, and economic development.

In 1938, in letters addressed to the Bahá'ís of Iran, Shoghi Effendi emphasized the importance of pioneering for expanding the Faith. Soon afterwards Bahá'ís relocated to about 187 localities, often to Iranian villages where no Bahá'ís previously resided. Some pioneers later left these places due to hostility, social pressure, and related prejudice in their new environments.

From 1941, about 145 Bahá'í families left Iran to settle in Saudi Arabia, Iraq, Afghanistan, Baluchistan, Pakistan, and Bahrain. Many settled in Iraq but were expelled by the Iraqi government two years later. Those affected included Abu'l-Qasem Fayzi, who moved with his wife to Bahrain in 1942 and was later appointed a Hand of the Cause of God.

In October 1946, the National Spiritual Assembly of Iran adopted a 45-month plan that encouraged settlement in twenty-two new localities within Iran and also identified destinations in Iraq, India, Bahrain, Afghanistan, and regions of the Arabia and the Persian Gulf.

During 1951–1953, several Iranian families moved to Africa as part of efforts to assist the British Bahá'í community's two-year plan to establish Bahá'í communities in three African countries. One of these pioneers was Musa Banani, who settled in Uganda in 1951 and was later appointed a Hand of the Cause of God.

During the Ten Year Crusade (1953–1963), Shoghi Effendi assigned each of the twelve National Spiritual Assemblies then in existence responsibility for specific goals intended to expand the Faith's presence. The plan included settlement in 131 countries, territories, and islands where the Faith was not yet established. The Iranian Bahá'í community accepted responsibility to assist with goals in a number of countries, including seven locations in Asia and six in Africa, as well as strengthening Bahá'í communities in additional areas in Asia and Africa.

After the establishment of the Universal House of Justice, a Nine Year Plan (1964–1973) was launched. During this plan, Iranian Bahá'ís assumed primary responsibility for pioneering to Afghanistan, Mongolia, and seven Asian republics of the Soviet Union. Related responsibilities continued into the subsequent Five Year Plan (1974–1979). During these plans, additional goals included Saudi Arabia and six African countries, along with secondary goals involving settlement in 56 other countries across Asia, Africa, Europe, and South America.

Iranian Bahá'ís sometimes faced practical obstacles in pioneering, including difficulties in obtaining visas and, in some cases, language barriers. For example, in the 1940s, those seeking to pioneer to Saudi Arabia and Bahrain often traveled first to Iraq and lived there for a period in order to secure documentation before proceeding to their final destinations. According to published accounts, these constraints diminished over time; at the conclusion of the Five Year Plan in 1979, the Universal House of Justice stated that Iranian Bahá'ís had outpaced other Bahá'í communities in the number of pioneers sent abroad.

Following the Islamic Revolution of 1979, the Bahá'í community in Iran experienced severe disruption and many Bahá'ís left the country. Only a portion of those who departed were able to settle in areas identified as needing pioneers. After the confiscation of Bahá'í administrative institutions in Iran, the Iranian Bahá'í community was not assigned official goals in later international teaching plans. Many Iranian pioneers faced difficult living conditions and significant material hardship, including residence in settings with fewer resources than those they had previously known.

== See also ==
- Religion in Iran
- Freedom of religion in Iran
- Iranian Taboo
- National Spiritual Assembly of the Baháʼís of Iran
