= Iran News Wire =

English language news and analysis website

- Founded: July 6, 2018; 8 years ago
- Type: News and Human Rights Website
- Legal status: Active
- Purpose: Iranian politics, civil unrest, economy, and human rights
- Official language: English
- Website: irannewswire.org

Iran News Wire is an English-language news and analysis website covering Iran. Founded in 2018, it publishes reports on political developments, human rights, civil society, and religious freedom in Iran for an international audience.

== Overview ==
Iran News Wire is an online news and analysis outlet covering developments in Iran. Its reporting includes human rights, civil liberties, political protests, prisoners' rights, religious minorities, and other political and social issues.

== Reception ==
Iran News Wire has been cited in governmental reports and academic research. The United States Department of State's 2020 Country Reports on Human Rights Practices for Iran cited Iran News Wire in reporting on the flogging of political prisoners. The Danish Immigration Service's 2020 Country of Origin Information report on the November 2019 protests in Iran also referenced Iran News Wire in documenting protest-related events. The Citizen Evidence Lab at the University of Cambridge cited Iran News Wire on documenting events in Iran using open-source information. Iran News Wire was also cited in a 2020 article published in Interface: A Journal for and about Social Movements on digital resistance and grassroots broadcasting in Iran.

Morning Star cited Iran News Wire in a report on poverty and the reported increase in advertisements offering the sale of human organs in Iran. Voice of America referenced its reporting in coverage of press freedom and the treatment of journalists in Iran. While Democracy Digest cited it in its analysis of nationwide protests and political developments. United Against Nuclear Iran also referenced Iran News Wire in a statement concerning activities linked to the Iranian government in Europe.

Iran News Wire has also been cited or referenced by regional and international media outlets, including Bianet (Turkey), Medya News, Ukrainska Pravda (Ukraine), and Utrop (Norway). Its reporting has additionally been republished or cited by media and research platforms including Eurasia Review, Iran Press Watch, Iran Probe, and Milli Chronicle.

In August 2026, the UK Home Office cited Iran News Wire as a source in its country-information research on Iran.

In August 2026, Global Security Org independently drew on Iran News Wire’s reporting in its coverage of Iran’s internal situation.
