= Farid Behmardi =

Baha'i executed by Iran

Farid Behmardi (Persian: فرید بهمردی), is a member of the Baha'i community in Iran. He was executed on June 10, 1986. His name is on the list of Baháʼís from Iran in a report published by the Bahaʼi International Community.

== Arrest and execution ==
Behmardi was one of the members of the third National Spiritual Assembly in Iran. After the 1979 Revolution, he was arrested and taken to Evin Prison by the Islamic Republic of Iran along with seven other members of the third National Spiritual Assembly, including Jahangir Hedayati, Shapour Markazi, Farhad Asdaghi, Ardeshir Akhtari, and Amir Hassan Naderi. He was tortured and executed in prison. His body was not returned to his family.

== Beliefs ==
Farid believed in the exoneration of the Baháʼís. He was loyal to Baháʼu'lláh who was the religious leader and the founder of the Baháʼí Faith.
