= Jinous Nemat Mahmoudi =

Iranian meteorologist

Zhinous Nemat Mahmoudi
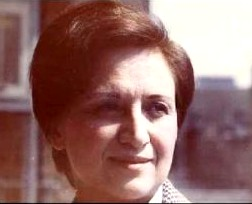
- Born: August 7, 1928; Tehran, Iran
- Died: December 27, 1981 (aged 53); Tehran, Iran
- Cause of death: Execution by firing squad
- Other name: Jinous Nemat Mahmoudi
- Occupations: Meteorologist, member of Baháʼí Faith National Spiritual Assembly
- Known for: Iran’s first female meteorologist, execution for leadership in the Baháʼí Faith
- Spouse: Houshang Mahmoudi
- Children: 3

Zhinus Nemat Mahmoudi or Jin(o)us Ni (August 8, 1929 – December 27, 1981) was an Iranian meteorologist who was a follower of the Baháʼí Faith and a member of its National Spiritual Assembly for Iran. She rose to lead the Iranian meteorological service. After the 1979 Iranian Revolution, state-sanctioned persecution of Baháʼís escalated, with her husband executed in 1980, then her arrest and execution in 1981.

== Life ==
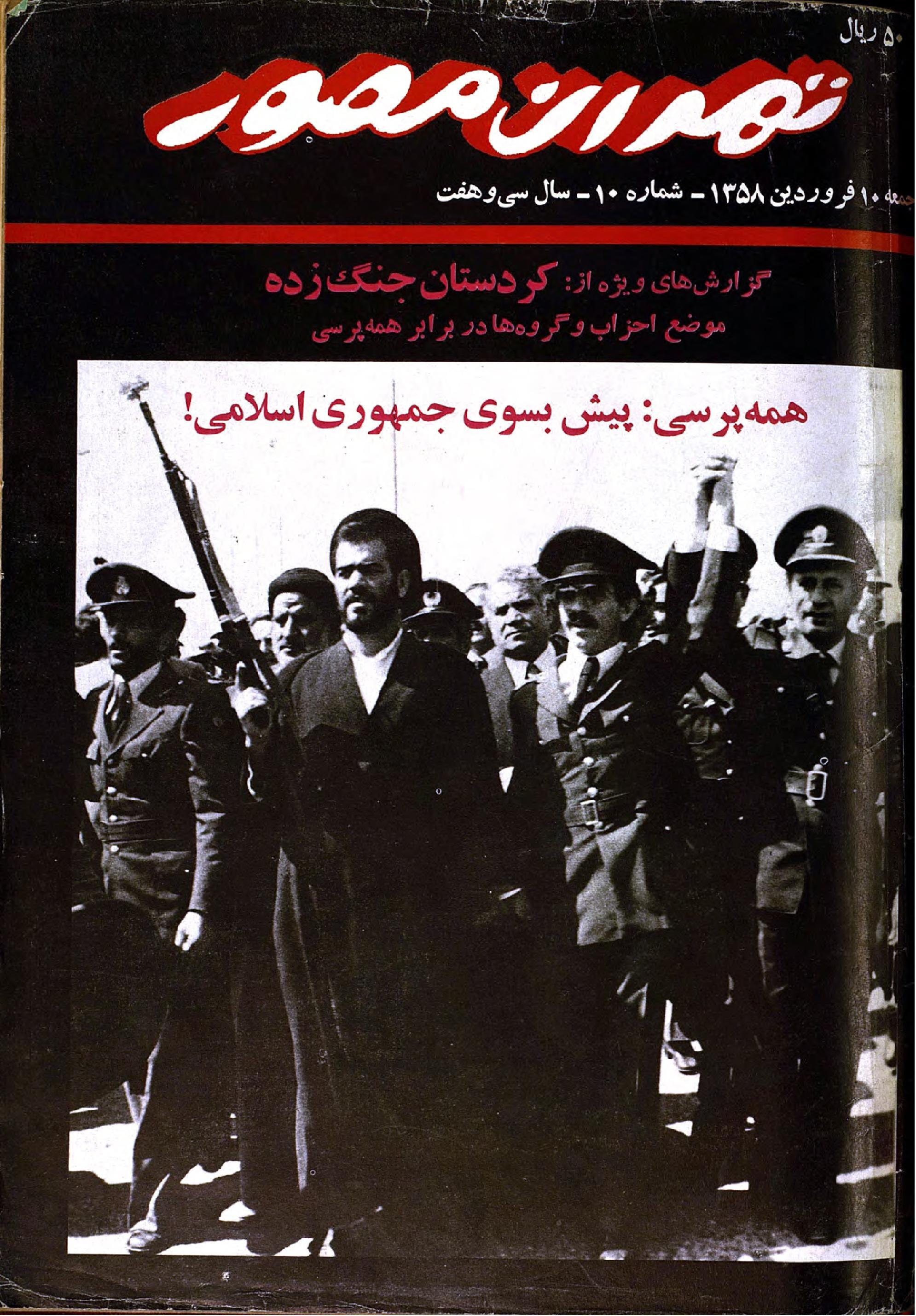
Front cover of her father's magazine in 1979

Mahmoudi was born in Tehran. One of her parents was a teacher and the other published a magazine. The magazine, Tehran Mosavar, was well established and popular during the reign of the Shah of Iran.

She was intrigued by science and information. She formulated a plan to try and gather together knowledge for safekeeping. Her plan was to use microfilm so that the information would be preserved.

At university she studied physics and meteorology and this led to work in weather forecasting. She was Iran’s first female meteorologist. She rose to lead the National Meteorological Organization which was part of her country's defense ministry. She had the de facto rank of a general. She took an interest in women's rights and she led the Atlas project that was investigating how solar energy might be implemented.

She married Houshang Mahmoudi, who presented programmes for children. They were members of the Baha’i faith and they had three children.

In 1979 the revolution happened and the Baha’i faith and its followers were victimized. They lost their jobs and they lived and worked in secret with their children sent abroad for their education. She rose to be a leader in the Baha'i faith despite some members being killed. She would visit other followers. Her husband disappeared without reason in August 1980. She was arrested on 13 December 1981 together with other leaders of her faith at a National Spiritual Assembly. The others were Sirous Rowshani, Kamran Samimi, Mahmoud Majzoob, Jalal Azizi, Mehdi Amin Amin, Ezzat Forouhi and Ghodrat Rouhani. They were killed by firing squad on 27 December. The whereabouts of her grave were given to her family later.

== Legacy ==
In 2018, the US House of Representatives was asked to pass a House Resolution (HR274) on the 36th anniversary of Mrs. Jinous Mahmoudi's death. The resolution "condemns the government of Iran’s state-sponsored persecution of its Bahai minority".
