= National Spiritual Assembly of the Baháʼís of Iran =

National governing body of the Iranian Baháʼí community

The National Spiritual Assembly of the Baháʼís of Iran was the nine-member elected national governing body of the Iranian Baháʼí community. First elected in Tehran in 1934, it coordinated the religious and administrative affairs of the community and the work of its Local Spiritual Assemblies. The Baháʼí community has no clergy; its elected institutions conduct its affairs through consultation and collective decision-making. These institutions developed gradually from principles set out by Baháʼu'lláh and elaborated and implemented by ʻAbdu'l-Bahá and Shoghi Effendi.

The Assembly's institutional predecessors included consultative councils established at ʻAbdu'l-Bahá's direction in Azerbaijan and subsequently in other parts of Iran. A council was formed in Tehran in 1897 and formally constituted as a Local Spiritual Assembly in 1903, with four Hands of the Cause and five other members chosen by them. It held weekly meetings to conduct community affairs. Other local assemblies developed along this pattern, and Baháʼí electoral procedures and recognition of their administrative authority became more firmly established during the 1920s.

The 1979 Iranian Revolution was followed by successive attacks on the Assembly. The nine people holding office in August 1980 vanished after being detained, and eight of their successors were executed in December 1981. A prohibition on organized Baháʼí activity brought the Assembly to an end in 1983, although seven people who had served on its third post-revolutionary membership were later executed. An additional wave of arrests, beginning towards the end of 1983 and continuing into early 1984, affected over 500 Baháʼís. Most had previously served on assemblies or had connections to former members, and no charges were brought against them. With the elected institutions gone, the community relied on an informal body, the Yaran, to meet essential needs. Its members were detained in 2008, and it ceased to operate in 2009.

The Assembly also had a publishing arm, the Baháʼí Publishing Trust of Iran, which was the official publisher of Baháʼí literature in the country from 1959 until its closure following the 1979 revolution.

== Background and functions ==
The Baháʼí Faith has no clergy. Its affairs are administered through institutions whose work is based on consultation and collective decision-making. The foundations of this administrative order are found in the writings of Baháʼu'lláh, the religion's founder, and were further elaborated and put into practice by ʻAbdu'l-Bahá and Shoghi Effendi. The institutions of the administrative order took shape in stages and gradually became established throughout the Baháʼí world.

Worldwide, the Baháʼí administrative system includes annually elected councils at the national, regional and local levels, as well as individuals and groups appointed to assist with different aspects of the community's work and needs. A National Spiritual Assembly consists of nine members elected annually by delegates to a national convention. Baháʼí elections take place by secret ballot, without nominations or campaigning. National Spiritual Assemblies coordinate the activities of Local Spiritual Assemblies, administer national resources and properties, oversee relations with government and support the community's educational and social activities. Their members also participate in the election of the Universal House of Justice every five years.

== Development before 1979 ==
=== Early consultative institutions ===
Before formal assemblies emerged near the end of the nineteenth century, prominent Baháʼís in each locality helped settle disputes and address religious and social matters through informal discussions. ʻAbdu'l-Bahá subsequently instructed the Hands of the Cause to organize consultative councils. The first were established in Azerbaijan, with other provinces adopting the arrangement over time.

Tehran's council, established in 1897, acquired a formal membership in 1903: four Hands of the Cause selected five additional people to join them. This body became the city's first Local Spiritual Assembly. It adopted a constitution and conducted its business at weekly meetings. Its example influenced the establishment of local assemblies elsewhere in Iran. In the 1920s, the use of Baháʼí electoral procedures became more widespread, while the assemblies' authority and their responsibilities in law and administration gained acceptance among the believers.

=== Formation of the National Spiritual Assembly ===
An eight-day national convention opened in Tehran on 26 April 1934. During it, delegates elected Iran's first National Spiritual Assembly, which remained based in the capital. The election represented a significant step in the community's institutional development: responsibility for religious and social matters affecting Baháʼís across Iran passed from the Central Assembly of Tehran to the new national body. Committees were then appointed for particular areas of work. To provide a basis for its procedures, the Assembly adapted a Persian translation of the bylaws used by the National Spiritual Assembly of the United States.

The network of Local Spiritual Assemblies expanded during the following decades. Statistical reports recorded 280 assemblies in 1950, 560 in 1968 and 679 in 1979. The corresponding numbers of localities with Baháʼí residents were 712, 1,541 and 1,699.

=== Community activities and publishing ===
The National Spiritual Assembly coordinated plans for the expansion and consolidation of the community. The first national plan began on 11 October 1946 and continued for 45 months, ending on 9 July 1950. Its objectives included strengthening existing communities, re-establishing dissolved Local Spiritual Assemblies and forming new groups and centres.

Educational activities included Baháʼí summer schools, first held in Iran in 1939. A permanent summer-school site was subsequently established at Hadiqih, northeast of Tehran, under the National Spiritual Assembly's supervision, attracting several hundred participants each summer. A central committee for the advancement of women was established in 1944, and women were first elected to Spiritual Assemblies in Iran in 1954.

The Assembly also oversaw the Baháʼí Publishing Trust of Iran, established in 1959. The trust produced religious texts, books, pamphlets, newsletters and periodicals. Restrictions on printing Baháʼí literature meant that many publications were reproduced from typewritten or calligraphic originals. Several hundred titles appeared before the trust was closed following the 1979 revolution.

== Persecution after the Iranian Revolution ==
=== Executions and imprisonment ===
Abductions and killings of Baháʼís began soon after the new government took power in 1979. Those responsible for community affairs, whether nationally or within individual localities, were particularly vulnerable. Peter Smith places these attacks within a campaign intended to eliminate the Baháʼí community in Iran. The loss of elected and appointed officeholders disrupted the organization of a religious community without a clergy. In the assessment of the Iran Human Rights Documentation Center (IHRDC), the authorities sought both to remove the people directing community affairs and to make Baháʼí religious participation itself punishable.

Disappearances preceded the collective arrest of the National Spiritual Assembly. Mohammad Movahed, a former Muslim cleric who had become a Baháʼí, was abducted in May 1979. Alimorad Davoudi, the Assembly's secretary and a professor of philosophy, disappeared on 11 November 1979 while walking in Tehran's Laleh Park.

=== Arrest and disappearance of the first post-revolutionary Assembly ===
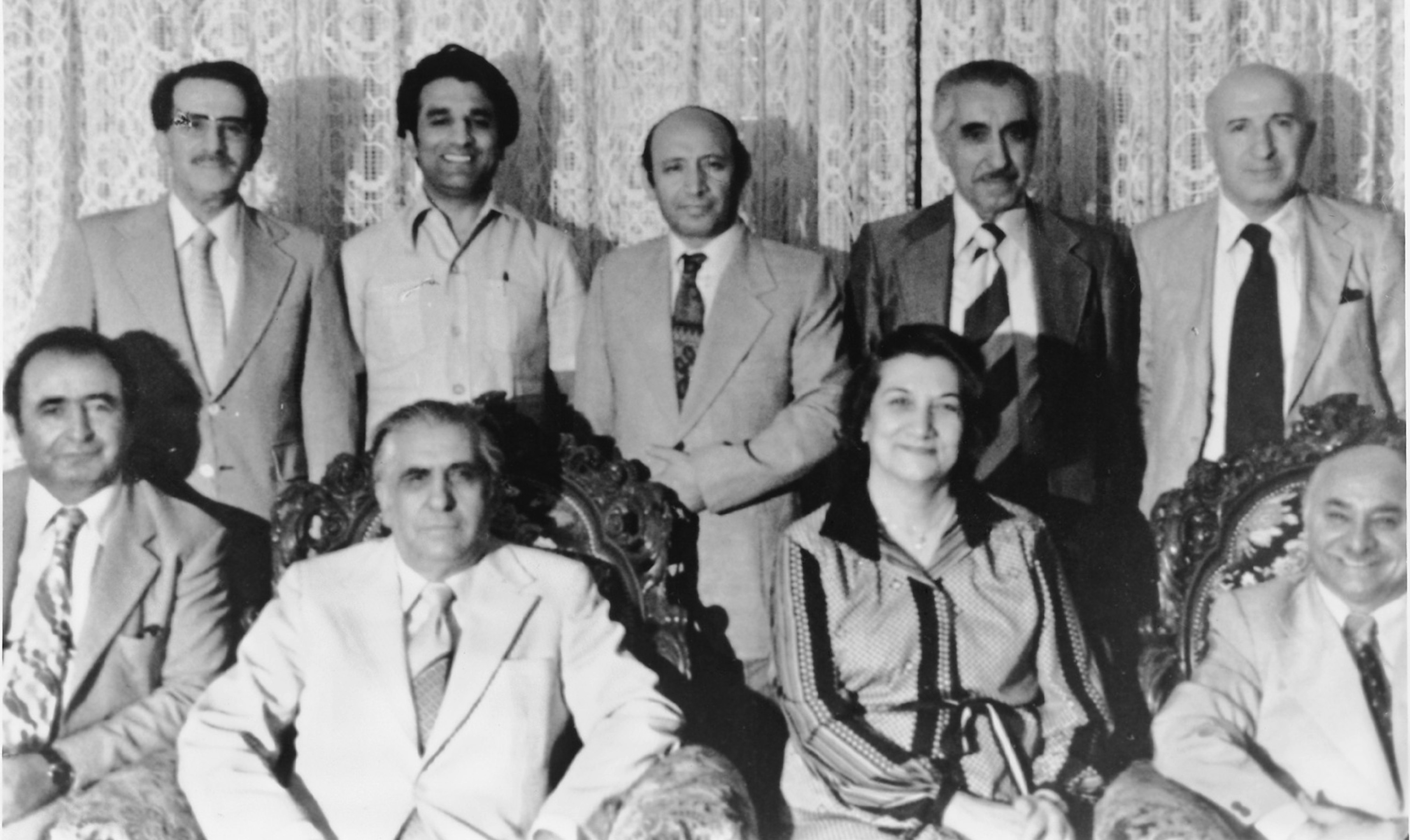
Members of the National Spiritual Assembly of Iran who disappeared after their arrest in August 1980. They are presumed to have been executed.

In February 1980, Assembly member and physician Hosein Naji sought official protection after armed men repeatedly entered his home and his wife was detained. He described these incidents in a telegram sent to President Abolhassan Banisadr, Ruhollah Khomeini, the health minister, the Iranian Medical Association and Ali Qoddusi, who was attorney general for the revolutionary courts. Naji asked how the attacks could be stopped, but his appeals received little attention and did not secure an end to them. His experience formed part of the repeated harassment of Assembly members that had begun with the revolution and continued into 1980.

A private home hosting a regular Assembly meeting was raided on 21 August 1980. Revolutionary Guards took away all nine elected members, without presenting an arrest warrant. They also detained two visiting Auxiliary Board members, whose role was to assist the Continental Counsellors. The Assembly's membership at the time was:

- Abdol-Hosein Taslimi
- Houshang Mahmoudi
- Ebrahim Rahmani
- Hosein Naji
- Manouher Ghaem-Maghami
- Ataollah Mogharrabi
- Yousef Ghadimi
- Bahiyyeh Naderi
- Kambiz Sadeghzadeh

Yousef Abbasian Milani and Heshmatollah Rowhani were the two Auxiliary Board members taken into custody at the same meeting.

Relatives spent the months after the arrests seeking information, continuing their efforts through January 1981. Among the officials they approached were Qoddusi, Akbar Hashemi Rafsanjani, the speaker of parliament, and Mohammad Beheshti, who headed the judiciary. Rafsanjani gave them conflicting accounts. On 10 September 1980, he acknowledged the existence of an order to detain the eleven people and said that visits would have to await the end of questioning. By 9 October, his position had changed: he denied that the government had arrested the Assembly members and proposed that a separate group might have taken them.

Some accounts placed the eleven detainees in Evin Prison for a short period. After 29 August 1980, however, no information about them emerged. Their subsequent whereabouts and deaths have never been established; the prevailing assumption is that they were executed.

=== Arrest and execution of the second post-revolutionary Assembly ===
Iranian Baháʼís responded to the disappearances by electing another National Spiritual Assembly. Those chosen accepted the responsibility despite the possibility that they too would disappear or be killed. The authorities soon directed their attention to this replacement body.

Amnesty International reported another group arrest on 13 December 1981, this time at Zoughollah Momen's house. Eight Assembly members were detained: Mehdi Amin-Amin, Jalal Azizi, Ezzatollah Forouhi, Jinous Naimat Mahmoudi, Mahmoud Majzoub, Ghodratollah Rowhani, Sirous Rowshani and Kamran Samimi. Two people involved in hosting the gathering were taken with them. One was Momen himself; the other was Farideh Samimi, whose husband Kamran was the Assembly's secretary.

The arrests prompted an Amnesty International Urgent Action notice on 18 December 1981. It urged supporters to protest by letter or telegram and to demand disclosure of the prisoners' whereabouts. The suggested recipients included Prosecutor General Mohammad-Mehdi Rabbani Amlashi; Mir-Hossein Mousavi, the prime minister; and Abdul-Karim Mousavi Ardebili, who headed the Supreme Court. Amnesty also recommended contacting the foreign and interior ministries.

The eight detainees were shot on 27 December 1981. Their families had received no notification of either judicial proceedings or the planned killings. The defendants had been denied legal representation and a meaningful defence, and no public trial had taken place. For many years, accounts of the case described an execution without any trial. In 2015, however, the BBC documentary Iranian Revolutionary Justice presented recordings of secret hearings involving seven of the eight. These showed proceedings that lacked the basic protections required for a fair trial.

Those executed were:

- Mehdi Amin-Amin
- Jalal Azizi
- Ezzatollah Forouhi
- Jinous Naimat Mahmoudi
- Mahmoud Majzoub
- Ghodratollah Rowhani
- Sirous Rowshani
- Kamran Samimi

The authorities' public account also changed. Having first denied the deaths, Mousavi Ardebili confirmed in January 1982 that eight Baháʼís had been put to death. In remarks to the Islamic Republic News Agency, he attributed the punishment to alleged service as foreign spies and rejected a religious explanation. Another defence of the executions followed that month from Mohammad Mohammadi Gilani, the official in charge of the Central Revolutionary Courts. Gilani treated being a Baháʼí as equivalent to working for foreign intelligence services.

Despite the lack of an official announcement, Baháʼís searching for the victims found their burial sites at Kufrabad, a section of Tehran's Khavaran cemetery. Several bodies shared graves. Jinous Naimat Mahmoudi's daughter later testified that some bereaved families had to reimburse the authorities for ammunition before the location of their relatives' remains would be disclosed.

=== Dissolution, arrest and execution of the third Assembly ===
A third Assembly succeeded the members killed in 1981. Its existence became illegal under a measure announced on 29 August 1983 by Hossein Mousavi-Tabrizi, the revolutionary attorney general. The prohibition covered organized Baháʼí religious and administrative activity, including participation in Baháʼí bodies and teaching the religion to others. As a result, the national institution and about 400 local assemblies had to close. The authorities defended the measure with allegations of espionage and conspiracy, and characterized the institutions as waging war against God.

Mousavi-Tabrizi elaborated on the decision in Kayhan Hava'i, a newspaper financed by the government. He emphasized that the state and its constitution did not recognize the Baháʼí community. On that basis, and invoking accusations that Baháʼís provided intelligence to others, fomented unrest and carried out sabotage, he maintained that their collective and organizational activities were prohibited. He presented the prohibition as a rule that had always applied.

The Assembly's response was an open letter, dated 3 September 1983, circulated to roughly 2,000 senior officials and other prominent Iranians. Written before the institution closed, it disputed the accusations used to justify the ban and set out the abuses Baháʼís had suffered. The authors addressed their appeal to the government and the Iranian public, invoking God as they sought recognition of both their citizenship rights and their rights as human beings.

The Assembly argued that religious belief, rather than any criminal conduct, accounted for the punishment of these individuals. It asserted that the authorities knew this, as did God. It therefore demanded that the state stop using invented offences and unsupported allegations to justify taking Baháʼís into custody, imprisoning them or subjecting them to torture and other mistreatment.

A central argument concerned the lack of evidence for espionage. The Assembly challenged the authorities to identify any classified material or spying apparatus recovered from the accused. It also questioned how the allegations could be reconciled with the lives of those targeted: farmers, students, women occupied with their households, young girls and elderly people. One example was a villager from the Yazd area, aged 85, who had never travelled outside his village. Another was the expulsion of primary-school pupils, for whom the letter demanded an explanation of what spying they were supposed to have carried out. The Assembly further pointed to the political character of espionage and its incompatibility with the Baháʼí requirement to abstain from partisan politics.

The letter addressed two other allegations by questioning the reasoning behind them. Accumulating automobile components, it argued, could not credibly be regarded as a plan to bring down a powerful state; even a prosecutor describing the Assembly as a spy network should not suppose that it would expect to achieve that result with spare parts. The treatment of overseas religious contributions was also challenged. Donations by Muslims for shrines in places such as Jerusalem and Iraq drew official approval. Comparable payments by Baháʼís, by contrast, were condemned as inexcusable and interpreted as assistance to foreign states, particularly Israel.

After sending the letter, the Assembly brought its own work and that of the remaining Baháʼí administrative bodies to an end. It undertook no further public action. The Baháʼí International Community describes this voluntary compliance as an attempt to show goodwill to the authorities. For the community, the consequence was the loss of the institutions responsible for organizing its shared religious life.

Closure offered no protection to those who had served on the institutions. Former national and local assembly members, other administrative officeholders and signatories to the letter continued to face intimidation and harassment. A wave of arrests during the closing months of 1983 and the opening months of 1984 swept up over 500 Baháʼís without charges. Most were former assembly members or had ties to them. Seven people who had belonged to the third national body were subsequently imprisoned and tortured, then put to death at different times from May 1984 to September 1987:

- Jahangir Hedayati
- Shapour Markazi
- Farhad Asdaghi
- Farid Behmardi
- Ahmad Bashiri
- Ardeshir Akhtari
- Amir-Hosein Naderi

=== Execution of ten Baháʼí women in Shiraz ===
The execution of ten Baháʼí women in Shiraz on 18 June 1983 attracted particular international attention. Their activities included teaching Baháʼí children's classes, and they were executed after refusing to renounce their religion. The Baháʼí International Community lists their names and ages as follows:

Name	Age
Mona Mahmoudnejad	17
Nosrat Ghufrani Yaldaie	46
Ezzat-Janami Eshraghi	57
Roya Eshraghi	23
Tahereh Arjomandi Siyavushi	30
Zarrin Moghimi-Abyaneh	29
Shahin Dalvand	25
Akhtar Sabet	25
Simin Saberi	24
Mahshid Niroumand	28

Roya Eshraghi was the daughter of Ezzat-Janami Eshraghi, and mother and daughter were executed together.

US President Ronald Reagan sought clemency before the condemned Baháʼís were killed. Khomeini interpreted the American intervention itself as evidence of espionage. In replying, he recalled Reagan's portrayal of the prisoners as peaceful worshippers detained because the Islamic Republic disagreed with their beliefs. Khomeini rejected that portrayal: in his account, the United States would have had no reason to intervene unless the prisoners were its spies. He maintained that Reagan's defence of them would suffice to prove the allegation even without other evidence.

=== Torture and execution of prominent Baháʼís and members of Local Spiritual Assemblies ===
Prominent Baháʼís carrying out community work and those serving on local assemblies also came under attack across Iran. Tehran's Ali-Akbar Khorsandi was among the earliest victims. A local assembly member, he was hanged on 12 April 1979, shortly after the Islamic Republic was formally established; he was the first member of Tehran's local body to be executed.

IHRDC interprets the attacks on community officeholders as a systematic means of dismantling Baháʼí leadership and denying the community its rights. Detention, torture and executions disrupted religious life in Hamadan, Tabriz, Yazd, Karaj, Tehran and Shiraz, as well as numerous smaller settlements. International pressure helped reduce official executions, but Baháʼís still faced imprisonment and torture, further arrests, and killings whose perpetrators were not identified.

The post-revolutionary toll exceeded 200 Baháʼís killed or missing, in addition to hundreds who experienced imprisonment and torture. Condemnation came from governments abroad, international organizations and prominent individuals. The killing of the ten women in Shiraz and the successive executions of elected Baháʼí officeholders attracted particular attention. That response contributed to a shift in the authorities' approach. With fewer executions, pressure increasingly took the form of obstructing education, employment and community religious activities, alongside seizures or destruction of community property and sacred sites. These measures deepened the assault on Baháʼí cultural and social life.

== The Yaran ==
After the prohibition of Baháʼí elected and appointed institutions in 1983, and the disappearance or execution of most members of the three national assemblies elected in succession, a temporarily appointed group known as the Yaran-i-Iran ("Friends of Iran"), usually shortened to Yaran, attended informally to the internal affairs and personal-status matters of the country's approximately 300,000 Baháʼís. According to the Baháʼí International Community, the arrangement operated with the government's full knowledge, and officials had regular, although informal, dealings with the group from 1983 until its members were arrested. Its activities included arranging religious observances, supporting children's and youth education, and attending to matters such as marriages and funerals.

Despite the authorities' knowledge of the group and their dealings with it, its final members were arrested and severely punished on charges that included the alleged illegality of their organization. The Baháʼí International Community rejected these allegations, stating that the group did no more than meet the community's religious and social needs and that no evidence supported accusations of threatening national security.

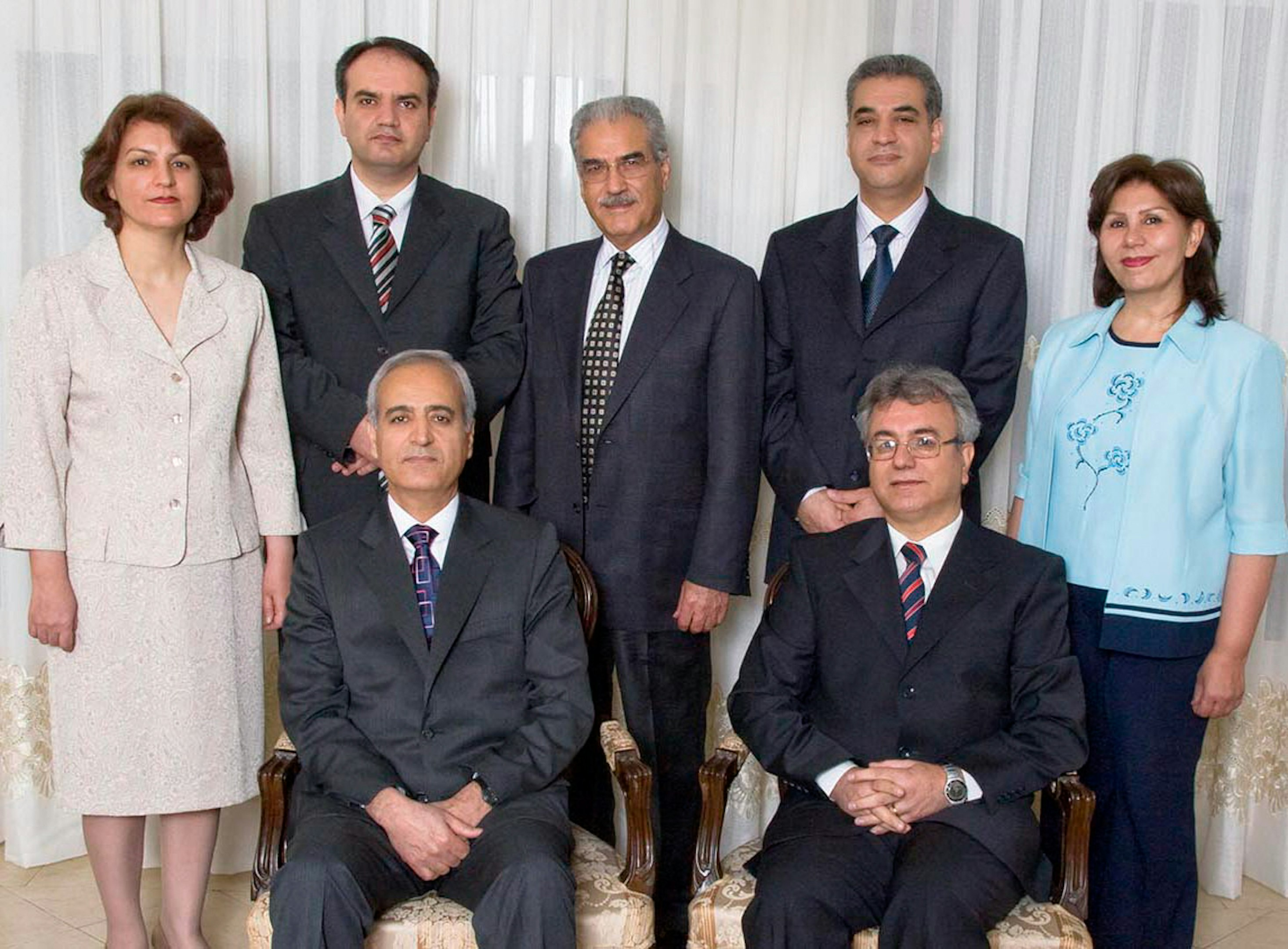
The Yaran: seated, from left, Behrouz Tavakkoli and Saeid Rezaie; standing, from left, Fariba Kamalabadi, Vahid Tizfahm, Jamaloddin Khanjani, Afif Naeimi and Mahvash Sabet.

The seven members serving when the arrests occurred in 2008 were:

- Fariba Kamalabadi
- Jamaloddin Khanjani
- Afif Naeimi
- Saeid Rezaie
- Behrouz Tavakkoli
- Vahid Tizfahm
- Mahvash Sabet

Sabet was arrested in Mashhad on 5 March 2008; the other six were arrested at their homes on 14 May. Amnesty International stated that they might be prisoners of conscience detained solely for their beliefs or peaceful community activities. They were held for prolonged periods without access to lawyers and were denied bail.

The Yaran and its local affiliates were dissolved in 2009 following an order from the prosecutor general. In August 2010, the seven former members received prison sentences of 20 years, which were eventually reduced to ten years. They completed their prison terms and were released between 2017 and 2018, with Afif Naeimi the last to be released, on 20 December 2018. Fariba Kamalabadi and Mahvash Sabet were rearrested on 31 July 2022 and subsequently sentenced to another ten years in prison each. Afif Naeimi was also rearrested in July 2022 and sentenced to seven years' imprisonment on 10 February 2023.

== See also ==
- Baháʼí Faith in Iran
- List of Baháʼís
- Baháʼí administration
- Spiritual Assembly
- Institution of the Counsellors
- Persecution of Baháʼís
