= Ali Murad Davudi =

Iranian Bahá'í

- Born: 1922; Shams-Abad, Iranian Azerbaijan, Iran
- Disappeared: November 11, 1979 (aged 56–57); Tehran, Iran
- Occupation: Professor at Tehran University
- Known for: Outstanding work in translation, philosophy, and leadership in the Baháí community

Dr. Ali Murad Davudi (born 1922, disappeared November 11, 1979) was an Iranian Baháʼí who was a member of the national governing body of the Baháʼís in Iran. He was a professor at Tehran University in the philosophy department. In 1979, during a wave of persecution toward Baháʼís, he was kidnapped and has been presumed by the Bahá'í community a victim of state execution. Stephen Lambden, a scholar at the University of California, Merced includes Davudi in a list of notable Bahai historians.

== Early life and education ==
Ali Murad Davudi was born in the small village of Shams-Abad in Iranian Azerbaijan in 1922. He was the great-grandson of Fath-Ali Shah Qajar through his mother, and his father was the grandson of the commander of Georgia. When he was ten years old, Davudi went to Tabriz where he lived for the next eight years. When he finished high school in Tabriz, Davudi traveled to Tehran where he entered a teacher training college and studied education, literature and philosophy; he graduated after three years. He then traveled to various Iranian towns and taught Persian literature. While he was in Zanjan he married Malikih Afagh Iranpoor at the age of 31; they had two sons and three daughters.

In 1955, at the age of 33, Davudi moved once again to Tehran to study philosophy at Tehran University while also working full-time as a schoolteacher. He then travelled to France, where he stayed for one year, to improve his French, which he later used to translate many French philosophical texts. In 1964 he completed his Ph.D. with a thesis on the philosophy of Aristotle and Descartes and was then invited to join Tehran University's faculty where he became a professor. Hossein Nasr, an Iranian professor at George Washington University, counted Davudi among a small number of first rate philosophers in Iran. Davudi eventually became the chairman of the philosophy department at the university until shortly after the Iranian Revolution. During his academic career he wrote many works on the history of Greek and Islamic philosophy, in addition to writing articles on Baháʼí philosophical and theological themes. He also translated many French language philosophical works in Persian that were published by Tehran University Press.

== Baháʼí life ==
Davudi was a life-long Baháʼí. In 1973 he was elected to the Iranian Baháʼí National Spiritual Assembly (NSA), which is the governing body of the Baháʼís of Iran. One year later, he became the secretary of that body, which necessitated travel throughout the country, which left him little time for his academic work. In addition to his administrative work, he also served on the Baháʼí national publishing committees, and also helped establish the Institute for Advanced Baháʼí Studies in 1976 to promote Baháʼí scholarship and research, an initiative proposed by the Universal House of Justice, the governing body of the Baháʼís worldwide. Davudi developed much of the institute's curriculum, which included classes on philosophy and mysticism with an emphasis on the study of primary texts rather than commentary.

Davudi would also give regular Baháʼí study classes to the Baháʼí youth in Tehran and in summer schools across the country. He would also regularly go to the recording studio where he would tape lectures that would be distributed through cassettes to the Baháʼí community. Some of his writings on the Baháʼí themes such as the "Station of Baháʼu'lláh" and "Divinity and Oneness" study some of the religion's foundational aspects. He also wrote essays on the Baháʼí teachings on life after death; the meaning of freedom; freewill and determinism; the station of man; prayer; the soul; philosophy; the study of history; science and religion; and non-involvement in politics. Many of his works were published in Baháʼí journals in Iran.

== After the Iranian revolution ==
After the Iranian revolution in 1979, the Society of Muslim Students declared Davudi as "anti-Islamic" and "anti-revolutionary"; members of militant Islamic groups regularly gathered outside his house, and thus he found that he could not continue to work as a professor and resigned from the university. After the Iranian revolution the persecution of Baháʼís was escalating, and Davudi was one of the most visible members of the National Spiritual Assembly, which had to defend the rights of its members to the government. As secretary of the NSA he also regularly interacted with the Baháʼí community through letters and talks, encouraging them to be patient through the persecution and co-ordinating the relief efforts. His daughter, who did not live in Iran, fearing for her father's life, traveled to Iran a few months after the Revolution and asked her father to go to the United States or Canada. While being aware of the danger he was facing, Davudi refused, stating that the Baháʼí community in Iran needed him.

== Disappearance ==
On November 11, 1979, while he was walking alone in a park near his home in Tehran, Davudi was kidnapped and was never seen again. The Liberation Front newspaper wrote the headline "Dr Davudi, University Professor is Kidnapped". While the Iranian government denied any involvement, later three Revolutionary Guards admitted that Davudi had been kidnapped on the order of the government. He is presumed dead, and was likely killed after his abduction.

== See also ==
- List of kidnappings
- List of people who disappeared
- National Spiritual Assembly of the Baháʼís of Iran
