= Kamran Samimi =

- Born: December 30, 1925; Tehran, Iran
- Died: December 27, 1981 (aged 55); Tehran, Iran
- Cause of death: Execution by firing squad
- Occupations: English language professor, member of Baháʼí Faith National Spiritual Assembly
- Known for: Execution for leadership in the Baháʼí Faith
- Spouse: Farideh Samimi

Kamran Samimi (Persian: کامران صمیمیl) (December 30, 1925 – December 27, 1981) was an Iranian English language professor and a translator. After moving to Jakarta, Indonesia, for 16 years, he returned to Iran in 1974. A follower of the Baháʼí Faith, he became a member of its National Spiritual Assembly in Iran. After the 1979 Iranian Revolution, state-sanctioned persecution of Baháʼís escalated, and he was executed in 1981.

== Early life ==
Kamran Samimi was born in November 1926 to a Baháʼí family. In 1942, Kamran, who was 19 years old at that time, went to India (Hindustan- Persian name for India) to continue his education. There he met Shirin Samimi and they got married. After a while, he returned to Iran and founded a foreign language institution. In 1955, along with his family, he went to Indonesia to assist and support the Baháʼí community that was there for 16 years. During the time that he was there, Kamran was an interpreter of the Iranian Embassy in Jakarta, and for some time he was a university professor. He was also a member of the Jakarta Local Spiritual Assembly. After returning to Iran, the National Spiritual Assembly appointed Kamran as a member of the Legal Board to defend the rights of the Baháʼís. In the summer of 1981, when a number of members of the Baháʼí National Assembly were abducted and disappeared, he was elected as one of the members of the National Spiritual Assembly.

== Arrest and Execution ==
According to Amnesty International, in November 1981, the Iranian authorities arrested eight members of the National Spiritual Assembly at the house of Zoghullah Momen. On December 13, 1981, Kamran Samimi along with Jinous Mahmoudi, Mahmoud Majzoob, Jalal Azizi, Mehdi Amin Amin, Ezzat Forouhi, Sirous Rowshani, and Ghodrat Rouhani was arrested and taken to prison.

Farideh Samimi, Kamran's wife, who was also arrested along with the members of the assembly, wrote: “They showed us no verdict for our arrestment. Mr. Amin Amin, who was a lawyer, asked do you have any documents to show why you have arrested us? But, they had and didn't need any documents or verdicts to show us. They just said and did whatever they wanted to”. Then on December 27, 1981, eight of the nine members of the National Spiritual Assembly were executed without a trial.

== After Execution ==
The execution of Kamran and the other members of the National Spiritual Assembly was not officially announced on December 27, 1981. First, the government denied it, but then, Abdul-Karim Mousavi Ardebili, who was the head of the Judicial System of Iran, announced that eight Baháʼís were executed. Thus, this way, the execution of the Baháʼís took on a formal procedure.
