= Iran Press Watch =

Iran Press Watch is a research entity that documents the persecution of Baha’is in Iran. According to the website of the Egyptian Baha'is, Iran Press Watch provides the latest news regarding the Baha'is of Iran and their persecution by their own government. It also updates its readers with the world's reaction to the gross injustice experienced by the Baha'is of Iran. Iran Press Watch was founded by, Ahang Rabbani, a Baha'i historian, translator, and author, who acted as Editor-in-Chief and Phillip Tussing, president of the trading firm Facilitation International, a Baha'i educator with the online Baha'i learning center, the Wilmette Institute who oversaw editing work of the team that grew to 14 volunteer contributors and editors.
