= Sirous Rowshani =

Baháʼí executed by the Iranian government

- Born: 1925; Tabriz, Iran
- Died: December 27, 1981 (aged 55–56); Tehran, Iran
- Cause of death: Execution by firing squad
- Occupations: Physician, poet, member of Baháʼí Faith National Spiritual Assembly
- Known for: Execution for leadership in the Baháʼí Faith
- Spouse: Parveen Sheikh al-Islami

Sirous Rowshani (Persian: سیروس روشنی) (born in 1925 – executed in 1981) was an Iranian physician and anesthesiologist. He was persecuted many times for his Baháʼí Faith before the 1979 Iranian Revolution. Although he was under scrutiny, he continued to work in a hospital. After the revolution, Sirous was threatened twice by the government of the Islamic Republic of Iran, part of the ongoing state-sanctioned persecution of Baháʼís, and in the winter of 1981 he was executed by firing squad, under the pretext of having committed espionage.

== Early life ==
Sirous Rowshani was born to a Baháʼí Faith family in 1925 in Tabriz. As a teenager, he stopped attending school and entered the market trade due to financial difficulties and family hardship. However, at age 17, he completed 3 years of study in one year, and then completed two more years of study and entered medical school.

After graduating in medicine, Sirous specialized in general anesthesia, and was employed at the Ministry of Health and Medical Education. In 1957, Sirous married Parveen Sheikh al-Islami and they had three children. Sirous was repeatedly threatened and harassed by those who disagreed with his religion. In 1974, he was transferred to Tehran by the Ministry of Health and was expelled many times from his job as an anesthesiologist. He was repeatedly re-employed because of his skills.

== After the revolution ==
Following the revolution, pressure continued to intensify on Sirous, often at the hands of the Islamic Revolutionary Guard Corps (IRGC), who bothered and threatened him. At his workplace, he was under surveillance and pursued by the militias. He and his family survived multiple assassination attempts, scenes and false accidents planned and executed by the IRGC.

=== Arrest ===
Sirous Rowshani, who had survived several assassination attempts by the fall of 1981, was detained on December 13, 1981, at the second session of the Baha'i Faith along with Kamran Samimi, Jinous Mahmoudi, Mahmoud Majnoob, Jalal Azizi, Mehdi Amin Amin, Ezzat Forouhi and Ghodrat Rouhani.

=== Execution ===
Sirous was executed by firing squad less two weeks after his arrest, on December 27, 1981, along with seven members of the second Baha'i congregation.

The head of the judicial system of Iran announced the execution of Sirous Rowshani and his friends for espionage. This led to their execution.

== Writing and music ==
In addition to his medical expertise, Sirous was well versed in artistic fields such as literature, poetry, and music. He was familiar with Persian traditional string music instruments such as setar and santur. While he played he read lyrics and sang songs.

In addition to a poetry book which Sirous had written, he produced several volumes of books such as Barge Sabz (Green Leaf), Hayate Baha'I (Life of Baha'is), Gorg Dar Lebas (Wolf in a dress) and Ayame Dar Beh Dari (Nomadic Days).
