= Effat Moridi =

Iranian activist

Effat Moridi (March/April 1929 – 24 May 2013), also known as Mother Moeini (Persian: مادر معینی), was one of the Mothers of Khavaran in Iran. She worked for justice for the victims of mass executions carried out by authorities of the Islamic Republic in the 1980s.

== Early life ==
Effat Moridi was born during the spring of 1929 in a cultured family living in Khorramabad and was one of the few girls in her area who were well educated. At the age of 14 she married Hojjatollah Moeini Chaghravan, a well-read young man. Together they had ten children, two of whom died at a young age.

== Family life and persecutions during the Pahlavi era ==
From the early days of her married life, she proved to be a strong and responsible woman. Mother Moeini was a patient, courteous, steadfast and persistent woman. She was particularly attuned with activist regarding women's rights. She trained and worked as a teacher prior to her career with Women's Organization and the Campaign to End Illiteracy and her engagement with sociocultural activities.

Her oldest son, Homayoun (a.k.a. Hebbat), gained awareness of the unjust dynamics between the bourgeoisie and the proletariat as a youth. He then engaged in religious activities as a supporter of Ayatollah Khomeini contributing as a distributor of leaflets in his support during the White Revolution in 1963. He was arrested in November 1967 at the age of 16. After further study he adopted the Marxist ideology and after his release engaged in political activism. As a result, he was arrested on two other occasions in 1972 and 1977.

Another one of her sons, Behrooz, engaged in political activities and faced arrest in relation to a group headed by Houshang Aazami. He was finally released in November 1978.

In light of her children's experiences during the Pahlavi era Mother Moeini became familiar with the challenges facing prisoners and their families starting in 1967. She established bonds with those affected that lasted over decades. Inspired by her own family's struggle during the imprisonment of her children, she raised her voice in support of all ideological prisoners and victims, playing an important role in protests organized by mothers and families of victims. Her tireless efforts to bring the struggles of her children and others in similar situations lasted throughout her lifetime.

Moridi was an active participant in the anti-Shah demonstrations supporting her children in the cause they had espoused, as well as opening her home to those harmed or wounded during protests. One of her sons, Behrooz, was among those shot during the early days of the revolution. With the Shah's departure her home was filled with joy as all her children were free and the family was whole once again. This lasted a short while as on 5 August 1979 27-year-old Behrooz was killed during a suspicious car accident while travelling to Ahwaz.

== Post-revolutionary persecutions ==
Between 1979 and 1982, the Moeini family home was attacked on a number of occasions by paramilitary forces. Attacks ranged from stoning, breaking windows, shooting and unlawful break-in and entry. Although Mother Moeini was religious she observed her children's right to freedom of opinion and beliefs by hiding their books and standing up to the attackers.

In 1982 one of her sons, Reza, was arrested and transferred to Evin Prison for 9 months. Furthermore, in 1983, Homayoun, who was now married and had a daughter, was identified by a former activist who had agreed to collaborate with the authorities, named Nasser Yar Ahmadi. The authorities arrested Homayoun at a phone booth. They denied him the right to visitation for over a year leaving the family to struggle with the challenges particular to the Iran-Iraq war years throughout that period while travelling between Khorramabad and Tehran to find out about his condition and whereabouts and take up his case with the Islamic Republic authorities. She often slept in parks or stayed up all night while waiting to meet authorities in the capital or the clergy in Qom, including Ayatollah Montazeri.

== The 1988 massacre and her son Homayoun (Hebbat) ==
In early 1988 another Moeini son, named Mohammad, was killed during an attack. This served as yet another emotional blow against Mother Moeini. However, she continued to press on with her activities to secure Homayoun's release while running a knitting school to help alleviate the family's financial struggles, and travelling back and forth to the capital. She was finally able to reduce his death sentence to life imprisonment. However, he was detained in the same ward as those sentenced to death. The authorities often denied him the right to family visitation and included him in mock executions. Homayoun was executed in 1988 along with a number of other political prisoners following a three-minute trial. The authorities failed to grant him the right to write his last will and testament, for his family to visit him for the last time or give him a proper burial. Instead, he was buried in an unknown mass grave and his family was denied any information until five months later.

However, Mother Moeini was more determined than before to seek justice. During the early days of discovering mass graves at Khavaran she was among the first survivors to head to the site and see the mass graves, and partially covered body parts and clothing, crows dining on the corpses of their loved one and attacks by Islamic Revolutionary Guards who denied them the right to weep at the side of their loved one's grave. She searched for Homayoun with her bare hands and came across beige-coloured trousers resembling a pair worn by Homayoun. The shock of this experience never left Mother Moeini. She honoured the memory of Homayoun on the first day of September each year hosting family and friends at her home. She also supported and attended memorials in honour of other victims. Regardless of regular harassment, beatings and other forms of abuse, she was among those who attended to Khavaran on the last Friday of each month and visited other Khavaran mothers and families so long as she was physically able to. However, the authorities move to deny the families access to Khavaran was the last blow to her frail body.

== Death ==
Moridi died in Tehran on 24 May 2013, at the age of 84.

== See also ==
- Mothers of Khavaran
- Mourning Mothers
- Mothers of the Plaza de Mayo
- Saturday Mothers
- Women in Black
- Black Sash
- Tiananmen Mothers
- Ladies in White
