= Payam Akhavan =

Canadian human rights lawyer

Payam Akhavan, Canadian human rights lawyer

Payam Akhavan OOnt FRSC (Persian: پیام اخوان) is an Iranian-born Canadian human rights lawyer. He is a barrister at Twenty Essex Chambers in London, a member of the Permanent Court of Arbitration in The Hague since 2016, and an Associate Member of the Institut de Droit International. He is also the Human Rights Chair and senior fellow at Massey College at the University of Toronto, a former professor at McGill University Faculty of Law, and a recipient of the Law Society of Ontario's Human Rights Award and an honorary doctorate.

He was previously Special Advisor on Genocide to the Prosecutor of the International Criminal Court, a legal advisor to the office of the prosecutor of the International Criminal Tribunal for the former Yugoslavia at The Hague and special advisor to the International Criminal Tribunal for Rwanda. He has served as legal counsel in cases before the International Court of Justice, the International Criminal Court, the European Court of Human Rights, and the Supreme Courts of Canada and the United States.

== Early life ==
Akhavan arrived in Canada in 1975 at the age of nine, when his Bahá'í family emigrated from Iran shortly before the fall of the Shah; after the 1979 Iranian revolution, he watched from Toronto as relatives and friends were targeted and killed in the ensuing persecution of Baháʼís in Iran, an experience he has described as profoundly shaping his life and career. He has practiced in international criminal law and global justice.

== Education and academic career ==
According to his 2021 Global Affairs Canada backgrounder, Akhavan completed his Bachelor of Laws (LLB) at Osgoode Hall Law School in 1989. He then pursued graduate studies at Harvard Law School, earning a Master of Laws (LLM) in 1990 and a Doctor of Juridical Science (SJD) in 2001.

He joined the Faculty of Law at McGill University in 2005, where he taught public international law, international criminal law, human rights, international dispute settlement, and cultural pluralism, and was promoted to full professor effective 2019. During his tenure at McGill, he combined academic work with practice before international tribunals, including the International Criminal Tribunal for the former Yugoslavia and the International Criminal Tribunal for Rwanda.

Akhavan has held a number of visiting and research appointments, including positions at Yale Law School, Leiden University, the European University Institute in Florence, Oxford University, Université Paris Nanterre, Sciences Po École de Droit, and the University of Fiji. He has also served as a Distinguished Visitor at the University of Toronto Faculty of Law.

He is currently Professor of International Law, Senior Fellow, and the inaugural holder of the chair in Human Rights at Massey College, University of Toronto. Akhavan has published extensively on international criminal law, human rights, and international dispute settlement and serves on the Editorial Review Board of the journal Human Rights Quarterly.

== International courts, tribunals and arbitration ==
Akhavan served as Legal Advisor to the International Criminal Tribunal for the former Yugoslavia Prosecutor and special advisor to the International Criminal Tribunal for Rwanda. He was counsel in the first ICTY Appeals Chamber case on the mass-killings in Srebrenica in 1995.

In the 2000s, Akhavan was counsel before the Permanent Court of Arbitration Eritrea-Ethiopia Claims Commission that followed the Eritrean–Ethiopian War (1998–2000). He was counsel before the International Court of Justice (ICJ) in the Case Concerning Application of the Convention on the Elimination of All Forms of Racial Discrimination (Georgia v Russia) concerning allegations of "ethnic cleansing" in South Ossetia during the August 2008 armed conflict between Georgia and Russia. Additionally he was also counsel to Libya in the International Criminal Court investigation in Libya for the case concerning Muammar Gaddafi's son, Saif al-Islam Gaddafi, and Abdullah Al-Senussi on whether the International Criminal Court (ICC) or Libyan courts would prosecute allegations of crimes against humanity arising from the 2011 revolution against Muammar Gaddafi.

In 2013 he acted as counsel for Japan in the whaling in the Antarctic case brought by Australia before the ICJ, alleging that Japan's scientific research program was commercial whaling in disguise. In 2008, he was counsel to Sheikh Hasina, Bangladesh's prime minister from 1996 to 2001, while she was imprisoned and campaigned for her release. In 2016, the Kurdistan Regional Government asked him to help investigate Islamic State crimes against Yazidis. In 2015, he acted as counsel for Bolivia in Obligation to Negotiate Sovereign Access to the Pacific Ocean Case against Chile. He is a member of the team of counsel for The Gambia in the Rohingya genocide case filed in 2019 against Myanmar before the International Court of Justice.

Since November 2021, Akhavan has chaired the Committee of Legal Experts for the Commission of Small Island States on Climate Change and International Law. He also served as counsel for the Commission in the advisory proceedings before ITLOS and the ICJ on climate change and international law.

== Advocacy, public engagement and media ==
Akhavan co-founded the Iran Human Rights Documentation Center to establish a record of the Islamic Republic's human rights abuses and promote individual accountability for crimes. He served as a steering committee member and prosecutor of the Iran Tribunal, a victim-based truth commission and informal court in exile, to expose the mass executions of political prisoners in Iran during the 1980s. In a 2012 New York Times article, Akhavan is cited as saying that the tribunal's work reflects a broader, still‑alive democratic movement in Iran that seeks justice, accountability, and a political order grounded in human rights. He also stresses reconciliation, noting that some perpetrators were themselves traumatized and coerced into brutality. In his view, years of state terror dehumanized Iranians, so their struggle is not only for democracy but also to regain their humanity. The Economist reported that after three days of hearings at the Peace Palace in The Hague, the Iran Tribunal issued an interim judgment on 27 October 2012 finding that the Islamic Republic of Iran had committed crimes against humanity and serious human rights violations against its citizens during the 1980s, while noting that the tribunal itself has no formal legal authority. This includes Ayatollah Khomeini's fatwa for the mass execution of some 5,000 political prisoners in the summer of 1988. Akhavan appeared in the documentary The Green Wave had testified before the European parliament, United States commissions, and the Canadian parliament and senate, advocating non-violent democratic transitions, emphasis on human rights rather than the nuclear issue, targeted sanctions against human rights abusers, and firmly opposing war.

Akhavan has written articles on articles related to Iran human rights issues in collaboration with 2003 Nobel Laureat Shirin Ebadi—awarded for her efforts for democracy and human rights, especially for the rights of women and children. This includes opinion pieces in the Globe and Mail and the Washington Post. He was the academic supervisor of Nargess Tavassolian, Shirin Ebadi's daughter, during her graduate studies at McGill University. In August 2008, the Iranian government press made the "accusation" that "Nargess Tavassolian converted to Baháʼísm in 2007 under the direction of Payam Akhavan and started her activities in the Association for Baháʼí Studies" amidst death threats against Ebadi for "serving the foreigners and the Baháʼí".

Following the December 2025 United Nations' Human Rights Council special session on the deteriorating human rights situation in Iran, held in Geneva, Akhavan— a civil society representative at the meeting—described the 2026 Iran massacres as "the worst mass-murder in the contemporary history of Iran".

== Publications and honours ==
Akhavan has published widely on themes such as international criminal law, human rights, transitional justice and cultural genocide, with his work appearing in leading law journals and edited volumes. His article Beyond Impunity: Can International Criminal Justice Prevent Future Atrocities in the American Journal of International Law has more than 1000 citations. His publications have examined issues including the prosecution of genocide, the role of international courts in responding to mass atrocities, and the relationship between legal accountability, collective memory and reconciliation. In 2012 Cambridge University Press published his nonfiction entitled Reducing Genocide to Law: Definition, Meaning, and the Ultimate Crime. Building on a concept first articulated by Raphael Lemkin, who used the term "cultural genocide" in his 1944 work Axis Rule in Occupied Europe, Akhavan has examined whether the destruction of cultural and religious life can fit within contemporary understandings of genocide and international criminal law.

In 2017, Akhavan was selected to deliver the CBC Massey Lectures and wrote the book In Search of A Better World: A Human Rights Odysseywhich became a non-fiction bestseller in Canada. A documentary by the same name centred around the book was subsequently released on CBC Gem.

In 2021, he was appointed to the Order of Ontario, the province's highest civilian distinction. In 2022, he was elected a Fellow of the Royal Society of Canada. In 2021, he received the Human Rights Award and in 2025 the Honorary Doctorate of the Law Society of Ontario.

== Books and academic source ==
- Akhavan, Payam (2005). "The Crime of Genocide in the ICTR Jurisprudence". Journal of International Criminal Justice. 3 (4): 989–1006. doi:10.1093/jicj/mqi064.
- Akhavan, Payam (February 2012). Reducing Genocide to Law: Definition, Meaning, and the Ultimate Crime. Cambridge, Massachusetts: Cambridge University Press. ISBN 978-0-521-82441-5.
- McGill University Faculty of Law (12 December 2012). "Libyan Tug of War".
- McGill University Faculty of Law (2016). "Payam Akhavan named Member of the Permanent Court of Arbitration". McGill University Faculty of Law. McGill University.
- Akhavan, Payam (2016). "Cultural Genocide: Legal Label or Mourning Metaphor?". McGill Law Journal. 62 (1): 1–32. doi:10.7202/1038713ar.
- "Payam Akhavan and Frédéric Mégret promoted Full Professors". McGill University Faculty of Law. 25 February 2019.
- Dallaire, Roméo A.; Coleman, Andrew (2013). "Genocide: Beyond Definition". Human Rights Quarterly. 35 (3). Johns Hopkins University Press: 778–785. ISSN 1085-794X.
- "Faculty – Visiting – 2002-03 | University of Toronto Faculty of Law". law.utoronto.ca.
- Akhavan, Payam (2001). "Beyond Impunity: Can International Criminal Justice Prevent Future Atrocities?". American Journal of International Law. 95 (1): 7–31.
- "Payam Akhavan".
- "Payam Akhavan and Frédéric Mégret promoted Full Professors". 25 February 2019.

== Government and official reports ==
- Global Affairs Canada (21 May 2021). "Biographical note" (backgrounders).
- Institut de Droit International (2023). Akhavan Payam – Institut de Droit International (Report). Genève, Switzerland: Institut de Droit International.
- Permanent Court of Arbitration (n.d.). Eritrea-Ethiopia Claims Commission (2001- 2008) (Report). La Hague: Permanent Court of Arbitration.
- "Erdemovic - Judgement - Joint Separate Opinion of Judge McDonald and Judge Vohrah" (PDF), International Criminal Tribunal for the former Yugoslavia, 7 October 1997
- "Standing Senate Committee on Foreign Affairs and International Trade, Evidence, 15 February 2012". Senate of Canada. Parliament of Canada. 15 February 2012.
- "The Nobel Peace Prize 2003". Nobel Prize. 2003. Archived from the original on 28 August 2008.

== Media reports ==
- Becker, Arielle Levin (9 January 2005). "Thinking of Home And of Human Rights". The New York Times. ISSN 0362-4331.
- Bethune, Brian (1 October 2017). "The interview: Payam Akhavan on how to fight evil, the failure of Facebook activism, and the sacrifices needed to make the world safer". Maclean's. Vol. 130, no. 9. pp. 22–22. ISSN 0024-9262.
- Carolino, Bernise (3 June 2021). "International lawyer Payam Akhavan appointed as senior advisor on Canada's Flight 752 response". Canadian Law Magazine. Canadian Legal Newswire.
- CBC radio (Créateur) (1 January 2018). "Struggling for justice;: How Payam Akhavan lost his home in Iran and found human rights". Ideas.
- Diler, Fatih Gokhan (28 January 2015). "Akhavan, intervening lawyer in the 'Genocide Case': "The worst crimes begin with words"". AGOS. Strasbourg: AGOS.
- Ebadi, Shirin; Akhavan, Payam (28 September 2010). "Human rights: Leave every stone unturned". The Globe and Mail. "Canada should take the lead to have stoning declared illegal under international law, say Shirin Ebadi and Payam Akhavan: "It's hard to believe that stoning would still be a concern in the 21st century, but the sentence of death by stoning against Sakineh Mohammadi Ashtiani, handed down by an Iranian court, has become a global cause célèbre. Widespread outrage has saved her from that fate, though she could still face execution by hanging."
- Ebadi, Shirin; Akhavan, Payam (5 June 2012). "Iran's calculus of terror includes Syrian response". The Globe and Mail.
- Ebadi, Shirin; Akhavan, Payam (30 November 2013). "In Iran, human rights cannot be sacrificed for a nuclear deal". The Washington Post. ISSN 0190-8286.
- "Iran, 1988: Judgment time". The Economist. 30 October 2012.
- "Japan attacks Australian role in whaling 'moral crusade'". The Guardian. London. 3 July 2013.
- Motamedi, Maziar (24 January 2026). "Iran rejects UN rights resolution condemning protest killings". Al Jazeera.
- Mistiaen, Veronique (15 June 2012). "Iran Tribunal to Uncover Iran's "Srebrenica"". Huffington Post UK. United Kingdom.
- McCurry, Justin (16 July 2013). "Australia accused of 'affront' to Japan's dignity in whaling case". The Guardian. ISSN 0261-3077.
- McTighe, Kristen (21 November 2012). "Years of Torture in Iran Comes to Light". The New York Times. Paris.
- Ditmars, Hadani (19 October 2017). "Meeting pioneering war-crimes prosecutor Payam Akhavan". The New Arab.
- Petrou, Michael (15 February 2012). "Iran's "heroic struggle to reclaim its lost humanity". Macleans.
- Petrou, Michael (23 May 2012a). "Tripoli vs. The Hague: two courts vie to try Gadhafi's son". Macleans.
- "Rights lawyer appointed for former Bangladesh PM". Reuters. Reuters. 6 August 2007. Archived from the original on 6 March 2016.
- Petrou, Michael (14 January 2013). "Tribunal finds Iran guilty of torture and murder of political prisoners". Macleans.
- Simons, Marlise (9 September 2008). "International Court Hears Georgian Case". The New York Times. Paris.
- Vaillancourt, Saleem (11 December 2020). "Iranians Fighting Hatred Around the World: Payam Akhavan". Iran Wire.
- Ward, Olivia (15 February 2016). "Forgotten Yazidis: The case for investigating genocide". The Toronto Star. Archived from the original on 3 October 2023.
- "Here are the bestselling books in Canada of 2017". 27 December 2017.

== Human rights organizations and NGOs ==
- "Reducing Genocide to Law: A Probing Reflection on Empathy and Our Faith in Global Justice". Freedom House. Washington, DC. 6 September 2012.
- "Payam Akhavan receives 2017 ICHR Human Rights Award". International Center for Human Rights. 11 December 2017.
- IHRDC (5 February 2011). "Deadly Fatwa: Iran's 1988 Prison Massacre". Iran Human Rights Documentation Center.
- "Iranian Press Targets Nobel Prize Winner Ebadi". Iran Press Watch. 3 December 2008.
- "Payam Akhavan". Institut de Droit International.

== International organizations and courts ==
- Global Peace and Prosperity Forum (n.d.). "Professor Payam Akhavan - Canada". London, UK: Global Peace and Prosperity Forum.
- Permanent Court of Arbitration (March 2026). "Current List – Annex 1: Members of the Court" (PDF). Permanent Court of Arbitration. Permanent Court of Arbitration.
- "Application of the International Convention on the Elimination of All Forms of Racial Discrimination (Georgia v. Russian Federation), Preliminary Objections, Judgment I.C.J. Reports" (PDF). International Court of Justice. 2011. Archived from the original (PDF) on 15 July 2017.
- "Perincek c. Suisse HUDOC – European Court of Human Rights". European Court of Human Rights. Strasbourg. 17 December 2013. Primary source.
- "2021 Human Rights Award Recipient: Payam Akhavan". lso.ca/.
- "Obligation to Negotiate Access to the Pacific Ocean (Bolivia v. Chile)". 24 September 2015.
- "Erdemović (IT-96-22)".
- "ICC Prosecutor Mr Karim A.A. Khan QC appoints Seventeen Special Advisers". 17 September 2021.
- "Request for an Advisory Opinion submitted by the Commission of Small Island States on Climate Change and International Law".
- "Obligations of States in Respect of Climate Change" (PDF). 23 July 2025.
