= Mothers of Diyarbakır =

Activist group

Mothers of Diyarbakır Protest
- Part of Kurdish–Turkish conflict
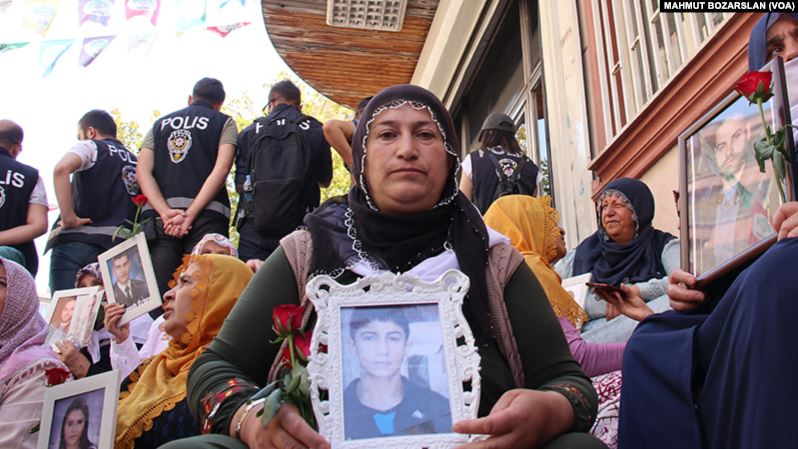
- The mothers sitting in front of the headquarters of HDP in Diyarbakir, 2019
- Date: August 2016 – ongoing
- Location: Diyarbakır, Turkey
- Caused by: Alleged kidnapping/recruitment of children by the PKK
- Goals: Demanding the return of children allegedly abducted by PKK
- Methods: Sit-in protests
- Status: Ongoing
- Result: No formal resolution as of the last reports

Parties
Mothers of Diyarbakır	HDP, PKK (indirectly mentioned)

Number
134 families as of March 2020	

Casualties
- Increased pressure on HDP, political support for protestors
- Protests supported by Turkish police and government media

The Mothers of Diyarbakır (Turkish: Diyarbakır Anneleri) is a group of Kurdish mothers who gather daily for a sit-in protest against the Peoples' Democratic Party (HDP), demanding the return of their children who allegedly were deceived or kidnapped by the Kurdistan Workers' Party (PKK). The sit-in takes places outside the Diyarbakır headquarters of the HDP. In contrast to the Saturday Mothers in Istanbul, who also ask for the whereabouts of their relatives and whose protests face oppression from the police, the Mothers of Diyarbakır group are supported by the Turkish police who escort them home in the evenings, and are protected by the local state prosecutor. The pro-government media also support the group.

== History ==
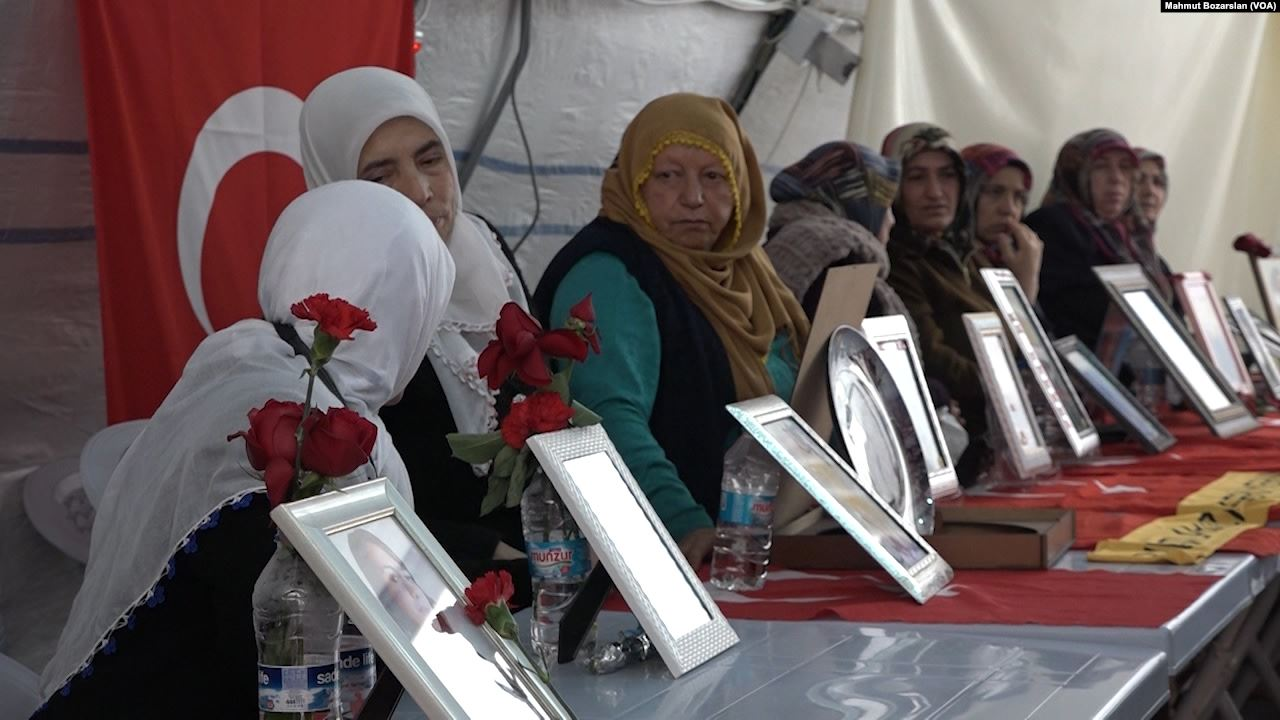
The sit-in of the mothers in 2020

Before the action in Diyarbakır, similar complaints arose from time to time from mothers urging their sons to surrender to the security authorities. Aytekin Yılmaz, a former PKK member who wrote books about the organization, said that some young Kurds voluntarily joined the PKK, while others under duress.

The protests began in August 2016 when Kurdish mother Hacire Akar accused the PKK of kidnapping her son. Soon after, a news agency close to Kurdish nationalists interviewed the 21-year-old boy, who claimed that he had not joined the PKK but had run away from home because of a family matter. He returned home. The result encouraged other mothers. Since 3 September 2019, 34 families have joined the protest outside the Diyarbakır headquarters of the HDP, a political party accused by several parties and the Turkish Government of having links to the PKK.

Due to the sit-in, Diyarbakır Chief Public Prosecutor's Office has launched an investigation against HDP Diyarbakır Provincial and District executives after media reports about threats towards the protestors by alleged PKK supporters emerged.

The HDP denies the allegations and says the protests are orchestrated by the government to demonize the party. Zeyyat Ceylan, HDP's Diyarbakir co-chair, claimed the ruling Justice and Development Party (AKP) was trying to avenge its June 2019 Istanbul mayoral election defeat by using the families. Metin Gurcan, a columnist for Al-Monitor, commented upon the protests as pushing HDP to "distance itself from the PKK and transform".

Attributed to the winter circumstances, the grouped stopped sitting on the stairs in front of the party building and moved to a tent to shelter from the cold weather. The police accommodated the group with food and water.

In March 2020, the number of protesting families increased to 134. There are also relatives from outside the Diyarbakır Province. The protests continued during the outbreak of the coronavirus, albeit in line with the measures taken to fight against the pandemic. The elderly went home, while the others sat together with a distance between them, while wearing gloves and masks. A PKK member who claims his family is part of the protests, calls his family to "stop immediately" as he claims not to have been manipulated. Murat Karayılan, a PKK commander dismissed any accusations made against the HDP or the PKK.

== Visits ==
On 7 November 2019, Vice-Chair Tomas Zdechovsky of the European Parliament Social Affairs Committee met with the mothers in Diyarbakır. Ambassadors from nine countries also visited the mothers, including Indian envoy Sanjay Bhattacharya, Ukraine's Andrii Sybiha and the U.K.'s Dominick Chilcott.

On 11 September 2019, both the head of Turkish Parliament's human rights commission and the head of the Parliamentary committee on equal opportunities for women and men visited the sit-in and expressed their support. Turkey's Minister of Interior Süleyman Soylu also visited the protest, but was criticized by main opposition Republican People's Party (CHP) Chair Kemal Kılıçdaroğlu by saying "Why do you go and sit there? Your duty is to resolve the problem."

The first lady of Turkey Emine Erdoğan, accompanied by Zehra Zümrüt Selçuk, the minister of Family, Labour and Social Services, expressed their support to the families during their visit on 31 December 2019.

In October 2019, the lobbying group Mothers of Srebrenica also paid a visit to the families in front of HDP headquarters in Diyarbakır.

== Awards ==
The chairperson of Health and Social Service Workers' Union (Sağlık-Sen) Semih Durmuş granted the Mothers of Diyarbakır the "Mother of the Year" award on 31 January 2020.

== See also ==
- Mothers of the Plaza de Mayo
- List of peace activists
- Yakay-Der
- Peace Mothers
