= Parvaneh Milani =

Iranian poet, author, translator, and human rights activist

- پروانه میلانی
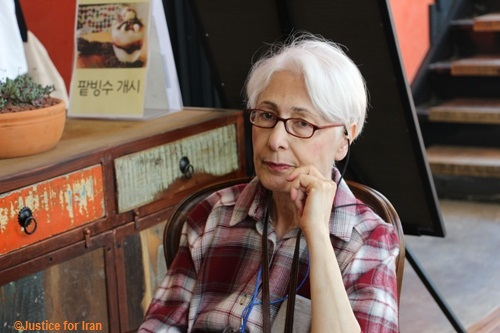
- Born: Parvaneh Milani; 1942
- Died: January 1, 2015 (aged 72–73)
- Occupations: Poet, translator, and human rights activist

Parvaneh Milani (Persian: پروانه میلانی, 1942 – January 1, 2015) was a self-educated Iranian poet, author, translator, human rights activist, a member of the Writers Association of Iran and a recipient of Gwangju Prize for Human Rights.

== Early years ==
Although Parvaneh Milani never attended college, she was able to educate herself and learned the English language. She translated a number of articles and books on the subject of psychology. She co-translated two books called 'The Psychology of Phantasy' and 'Dreams and the growth of personality' along with a number of other articles.

== Activism ==
After the 1979 Iranian uprising Milani's brother -Rahim Milani-, who had been imprisoned for his Communist political activities during the Pahlavi period, was executed by the Islamic Republic of Iran's government. Milani became a vocal opponent against the treatment of the mourning families by the Islamic Republic. Milani's brother Rahim Milani, was a member of Organization of Revolutionary Workers of Iran (Rahe Kargar) who was executed in prison while serving a prison term.

Since the early 1980s, Parvaneh Milani became a vocal advocate against state violence. By writing a number of pamphlets, essays, letters and interviewing the international media outlets; she gained the attention of the security forces, especially Iran's Ministry of Intelligence, who threatened her life on multiple occasions and eventually forced her and her family into exile. In addition to her efforts to keep the memory of the victims of the 1980s massacre alive, she authored many letters to domestic and international institutions demanding justice for the families of the victims. In 1997, after the election of Mohammad Khatami to the office of presidency in Iran; she wrote a letter of grievances to the reformist opposition and asked the government to stop harassing the mourning relatives of the 1980s massacres when they visit the graveside of their loved ones and allow them to rightfully mourn their loved ones who were buried in Khavaran cemetery and elsewhere.

She asked the City Council of Tehran and Islamic Consultative Assembly’s Article 90 Commission, inter alia, to allow the unmarked graves of those politically executed to be inscribed. She had also asked them to allow the mourning relatives to be able to visit the gravesides without the fear of intimidation, molestation and reprisal. She never received a response from any of these authorities and institutions. In 2001 she wrote another letter signed as "Parvaneh Milani and a group of families" who demanded from the city government of Tehran to provide maintenance, gravesides and build the necessary facilities in Khavaran cemetery in accordance with the letter of the law. Although, a copy of this letter was sent to official Iranian Government news agencies including ISNA and IRNA; this letter, as well as, the previous letters remain unanswered by the Iranian officials.

== Awards and honors ==
In May 2015, the Mothers of Khavaran were awarded the Gwangju Prize for Human Rights. In a letter of condolence, The May 18 Memorial Foundation, "acknowledged her and Mothers of Khavaran’s work for promoting and protecting human rights in the most challenging situations."

== Publications in Persian ==
=== Poetry ===
- No One Will Ever Know: A Collection of Poems. 1974 or 1975 (هیچکس نمیداند: برگزیده شعرهای ۱۳۵۳ – ۱۳۴۷)

=== Translations ===
- The Psychology of Phantasy: an Experimental and Theoretical Investigation into the Intrinsic Laws of Productive Mentality. 1992 (روانشناسی تخیل : پژوهشی نثری و عملی در قوانین تخیل و نیروهای ذهنی فرآور)
- Dreams and the growth of personality; expanding awareness in psychotherapy. 1992 (رويا ها و رشد شخصيت :گسترش آگاهى در روان درمانى)

== External links/sources ==
- An interview with Parvaneh Milani: A poet and family member of the 1980's massacre in Iran, Interview Series by Parvaneh Milani
- Mothers of Khavarani biographies
