= World Kobanê Day =

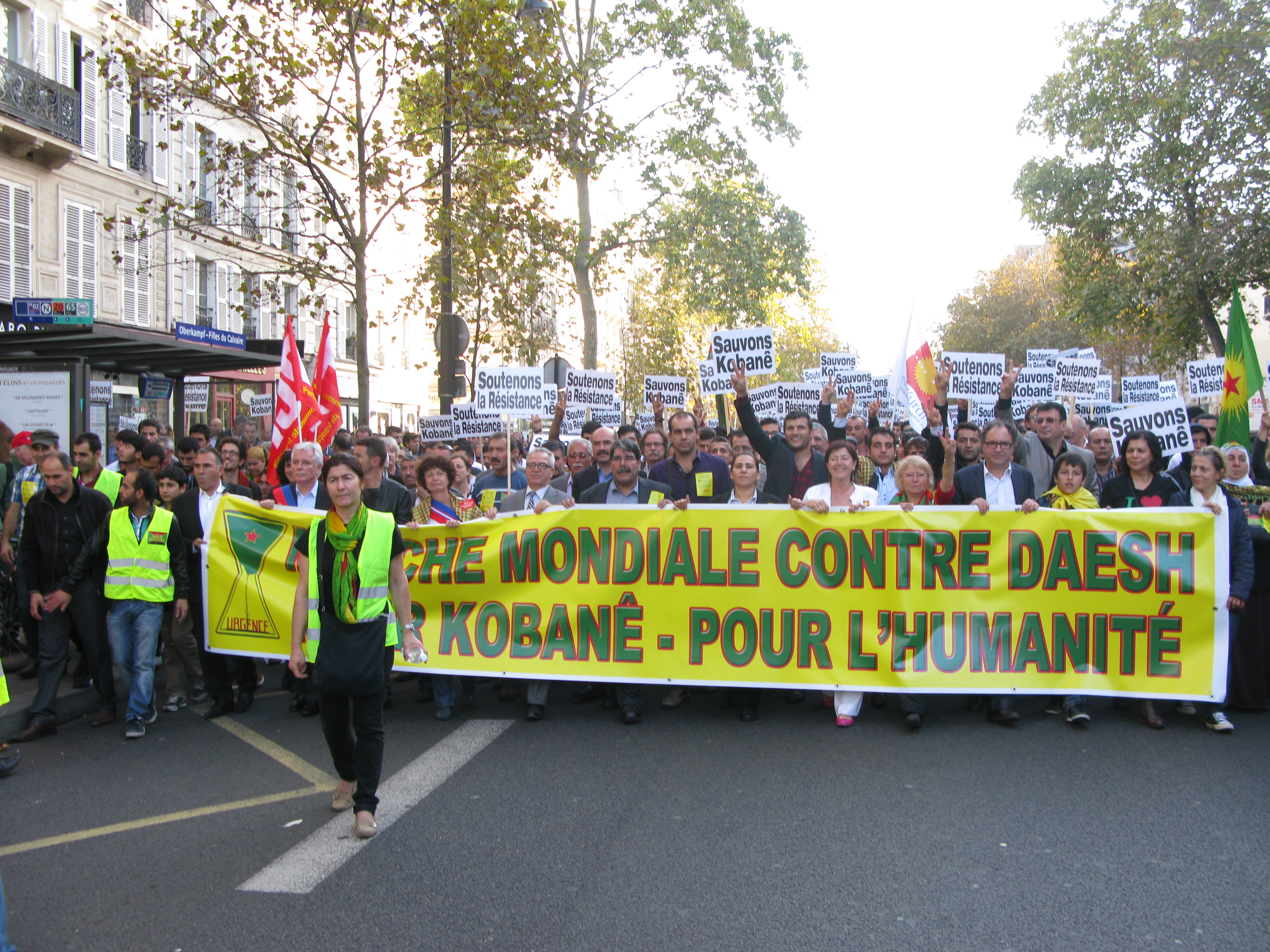
Demonstration at the World Day against Daesh, for Kobanê, for Humanity, conducted by the Kurdish democratic council of France and other organizations, 1 November 2014, Beaumarchais boulevard in Paris.

The World Kobane Day (Kurdish: Roja cîhanî ya Kobanê) is an annual day of remembrance and solidarity observed on November 1st. It commemorates the resistance of the city of Kobanê against the Islamic State (IS) and highlights its significance for the Kurdish Self-Administration of North and East Syria, feminist movements (Jin Jiyan Azadî), and international solidarity.

== Background and Motivation ==
=== The Siege of Kobanê (2014–2015) ===
In September 2014, the Islamic State began a siege of the city of Kobanê (Ayn al-Arab) and the surrounding areas, aiming to conquer them. The population and the Kurdish defense forces—particularly the YPG (People's Protection Units) and YPJ (Women's Protection Units)—put up fierce resistance, supported by airstrikes from the International Coalition against the Islamic State.

In January 2015, Kurdish forces successfully recaptured the city. The siege and the resistance of Kobanê garnered international attention and became symbolically significant – they are considered one of the first severe military defeats inflicted on the IS.

=== Origin, meaning, and symbolism ===
World Kobane Day was initiated through the efforts of individuals from civil society, academia, human rights organizations, and Kurdish movements, who proclaimed November 1 as a day of global solidarity. According to the human rights organization İHD, a group of scientists, Nobel Peace Prize laureates, and human rights activists were involved in declaring November 1 as World Kobanê Day.

Kobanê is seen as a symbol for the fight against Islamic extremism, for autonomous self-governance, gender equality, and fundamental democratic values. The slogan "Jin, Jîyan, Azadî" ("Woman, Life, Freedom") is frequently used in connection with World Kobanê Day and the Kurdish movement.

On November 1, 2014, people worldwide took to the streets in many cities to demonstrate their solidarity with Kobanê. Since then, events, rallies, cultural programs, and information campaigns have been regularly organized.

Over time, the day has become a recurring symbol of international solidarity with the Kurdish Self-Administration of North and East Syria, serving to commemorate victims and to demand support for reconstruction, human rights, and political freedom. Especially in years with renewed conflicts or attacks on the self-governance areas, World Kobanê Day gains heightened relevance.

The goals of World Kobanê Day include, among others:

- Keeping the memory of the resistance of Kobanê and its victims alive.
- Creating public awareness of current developments in North and East Syria.
- Fostering networking among solidarity groups and initiating debates about international responsibility.
- Emphasizing the role of women in conflict and post-war areas.

== Controversies and criticism ==
Since the day is partly organized by Kurdish movements, criticism is occasionally voiced that it serves political propaganda or one-sided views. In some states with repressive regimes, organizing such demonstrations can be risky or subject to state surveillance. Some view the significance primarily as a Kurdish symbol, while others see it as a general symbol against terrorism and for international solidarity. Critics, however, argue that commemorative days alone have little practical effect regarding political support, military security, or economic aid.
