= Mourning Mothers =

Iranian activist group

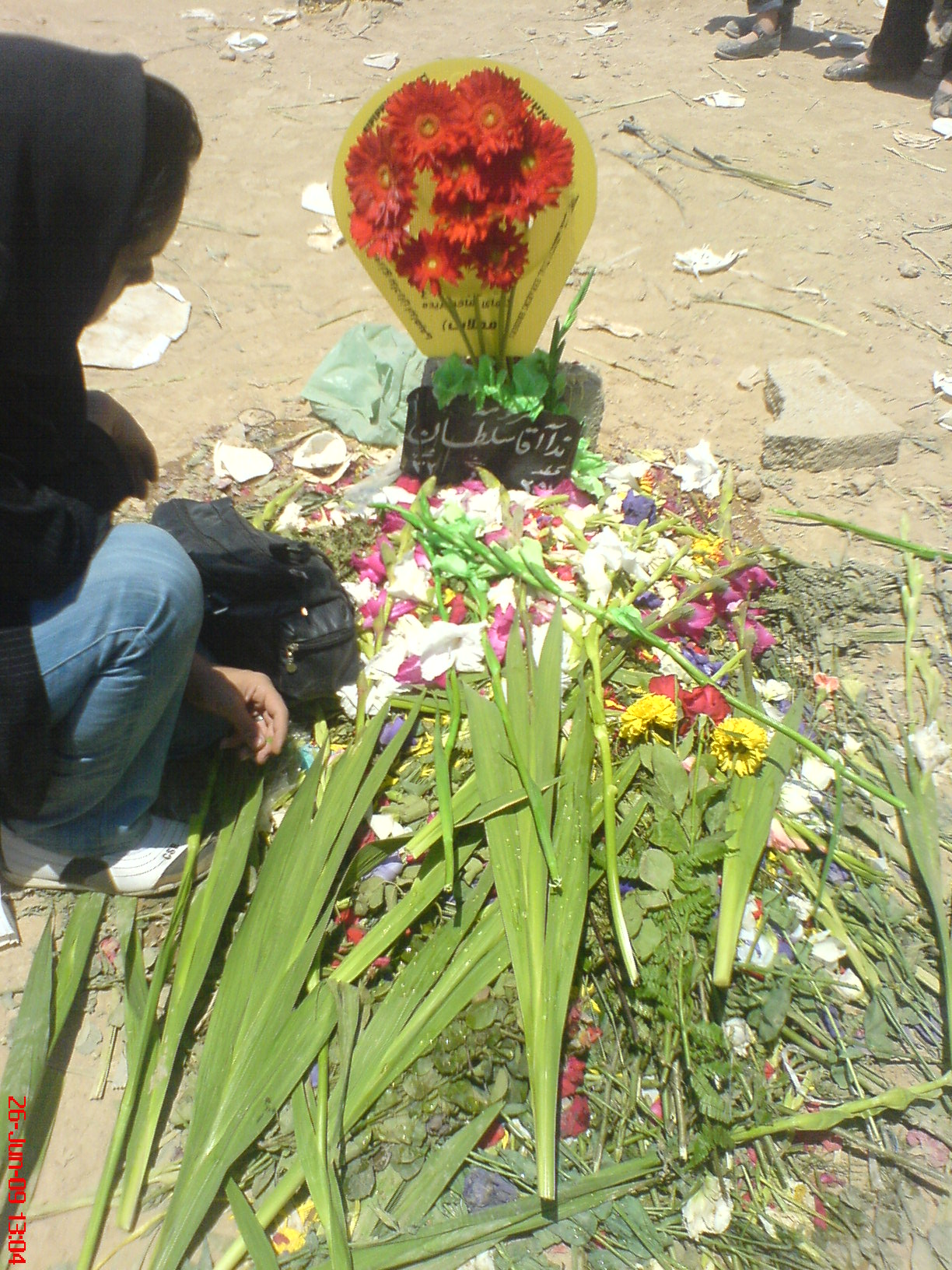
Grave of Neda Agha-Soltan

The Mourning Mothers (also known as the Mothers of Laleh Park; Persian: مادران پارک لاله, romanized: madaran park laleh) are a group of Iranian women whose spouses or children were killed by government agents in the protests following the disputed Iranian presidential election of 2009. The group also includes relatives of victims of earlier human rights abuses, including mass executions during the 1980s. The principal demand of the Mourning Mothers is government accountability for the deaths, arrests, and disappearances of their children. The mothers meet on Saturdays in Laleh Park in Tehran, and are often chased by the police and arrested.

The Mourning Mothers have called for the revocation of death sentences for political prisoners, the release of prisoners of conscience, and trials of "those who were responsible for and who ordered their children's murders." In 2009, Iranian Nobel Laureate Shirin Ebadi urged women around the world to show solidarity with the Mourning Mothers by wearing black and meeting in neighborhood parks on Saturdays from 7 to 8 pm.

== History and Formation ==
As already mentioned: the Mourning Mothers emerged in the political context of the 2009 Iranian presidential election protests, which became one of the largest opposition movements in the history of the Islamic Republic of Iran. The election, in which incumbent president Mahmoud Ahmadinejad was declared the winner over the reformist candidate Mir-Hossein Mousavi, was widely disputed because of claims of election irregularities. Because of the announcement of the results, mass protests, which became known as The Green movement, broke out across Iran.

Although Supreme Leader Ali Khamenei initially upheld the official results and a partial recount was conducted, the government maintained Ahmadinejad’s victory which led to continued demonstrations. The protests were met with a large-scale security crackdown which involved the police and the Islamic Revolutionary Guard Corps (IRGC). This resulted in arrests, violence against demonstrators, and reported fatalities. The unrest continued into late 2009 through major events such as the Ashura protests and was eventually reduced in the following years because of the intensified repression, including the house arrest of key opposition figures.

== Arrests and imprisonment ==
On January 9, 2010, more than thirty Mourning Mothers were arrested by security agents at Laleh Park. According to eyewitnesses, the mothers were attacked by over 100 police and plainclothes agents, who violently forced the mothers into police vans. These arrests were widely condemned by human rights organizations. The mothers were released from prison on January 14, 2010.

On December 27, 2011, group member Zhila Karamzadeh-Makvandi was arrested and sentenced to two years in Evin Prison for "founding an illegal organization" and "acting against state security". Amnesty International protested her imprisonment, designating her a prisoner of conscience "held solely for her peaceful activities as a member of the Mothers of Laleh Park". On April 4, 2012, group member Mansoureh Behkish was informed she was sentenced to four years' imprisonment for her activities with the group. Another member, Leyla Seyfollahi, and a male supporter, Nader Ahsani, were sentenced to two years' imprisonment apiece, but had not yet been summoned to begin their sentences.

On October 26, 2017, another member, Shahnaz Akmali, was sentenced by The Revolutionary Court in Tehran in to one year in prison on charges of “propaganda against the state” for her involvement in the group’s activities, including interviews and participation in commemorative gatherings. She was also given additional restrictions, including bans on political activity, internet use, and travel.

== Recent developments and related movements ==
Following the nationwide protests in Iran in November 2019, which started when the government raised fuel prices, new groups of mourning families and mothers appeared after hundreds of protesters were killed during the government crackdown. Some of these women became known as the “Aban Mothers,” with “Aban” referring to the month in the Iranian calendar when the protests happened. Like the Mothers of Laleh Park, the Aban Mothers publicly called for justice, accountability, and recognition for the victims, but they did it in a different way. The Aban Mothers used the internet to post videos and provide interviews.

In 2022, the Mothers of Laleh Park expressed their support for the nationwide protests in Iran because of the death of Jina Mahsa Amini while in police custody. The mothers made a public statement declaring their solidarity with the “Woman, Life, Freedom” (Kurdish version: Jin, Jiyan, Azadi) movement and strongly criticised the government’s repression of protesters, particularly in the Kurdish and Baluch regions. The statement repeated the group’s long-standing demands for: the release of political prisoners, freedom of expression and meeting, an end to executions and torture, and greater rights for women in Iran.

Beginning in December 2025 and continuing into 2026, Iran experienced another wave of nationwide protests because of severe economic difficulties, rising inflation, and the decline of the Iranian rial. What began as demonstrations over economic complaints expanded into rejection of the Islamic Republic in several cities across the country. The demonstrations were restrained with large-scale security responses involving arrests, internet restrictions, and deaths among protesters.

Following the deaths of the protesters during the brutal crackdown of the 2025/2026 protests, the Iranian mothers and families of victims are using devastating but remarkable new forms of mourning. Some sources referred to these acts as the “Dancing Mothers,” describing instances in which grieving parents danced or performed acts of public mourning at cemeteries and funerals as a form of protest against state repression. Although these mothers are mourning in a different way then the Mothers of Laleh park, they are fundamentally united in mourning their children as a result of state violence and repression.

== See also ==
- Ladies in White
- Mothers of Khavaran
- Mothers of the Plaza de Mayo
- Saturday Mothers
- Iranian women
- List of famous Persian women
- List of peace activists
- Intellectual movements in Iran
- Persian women's movement
- Islamic feminism
- Sohrab Aarabi
