= Khavaran cemetery =

Cemetery in Tehran, Iran

Coordinates: 35°33′25″N 51°34′15″E

Khavaran cemetery (Persian: گورستان خاوران) is an irregular unmarked cemetery located in southeast Tehran. The graves in the cemetery do not have any marking on them. The government does not allow the families of the dead to mourn in the cemetery and the identity of those who were buried in the cemetery is unknown to their relatives. Khavaran initially was a traditional burial ground for religious minorities, "on the grounds that they were apostates and must not contaminate the resting place of Muslims." During the 1988 executions of Iranian political prisoners committed by the Islamic Republic of Iran, the government used Khavaran as the site of unmarked mass graves for those killed. The portion of the cemetery in which the political prisoners are buried is colloquially known as lanatabad (لعنت‌آباد), place of the damned.

In 2009, the Defenders of Human Rights Center and dissident cleric Grand Ayatollah Hussein-Ali Montazeri condemned demolition allegedly occurring at Khavaran cemetery by the Iranian authorities.

== See also ==
- 1988 executions of Iranian prisoners
- Mothers of Khavaran
- StopExecutionsinIran
- Effat Moridi (Mother Moeini)
- Golestan Shohada of Isfahan
