= Mansoureh Behkish =

Iranian human rights activist

- منصوره بهکیش
- Occupation: Human rights activist
- Known for: Member of Mothers of Khavaran and Mourning Mothers; advocacy for truth and justice for victims of the 1988 executions of Iranian political prisoners
- Notable work: Open letters and public statements on human rights violations in Iran
- Criminal charges: "Propaganda against the state", "Collusion against the country"
- Criminal penalty: 7.5 years in prison (2018) + previous 4.5 years (2011)
- Awards: Finalist, Front Line Defenders Award for Human Rights Defenders at Risk (2013)

Mansoureh Behkish (Persian: منصوره بهکیش) is an Iranian human rights activist. She lost six family members during the 1988 executions of Iranian political prisoners. Behkish is an active member of the social justice groups Mothers and Families of Khavaran and Mothers of Laleh Park, two groups that raise awareness for politically motivated killings, detainments, and forcible disappearances in Iran.

In February 2018, Behkish was sentenced to 7.5 years in jail for "propaganda against the state" and "collusion against the country". These were added to a previous 4.5 year sentence from 2011 for "assembling and conspiring with the intent to harm national security" and "propaganda against the system".

== Activism ==
Behkish is an active and prominent member of the social justice groups Mothers of Khavaran and Mothers of Laleh Park (also known as Mourning Mothers).

She was a finalist for the 2013 Front Line Defenders Award for Human Rights Defenders at Risk.

== Prosecution ==
Behkish was arrested in 2011. On December 25, 2011 she received a 4.5 year sentence for "assembling and conspiring with the intent to harm national security" and "propaganda against the system".

She wrote an open letter to President Hassan Rouhani, in August 2013, in which she described the persecution and legal prosecution she has experienced.

On September 16, 2016, she was stopped at the Imam Khomeini International Airport in Tehran while boarding a flight to visit her daughter who lives in Ireland. During this incident, her passport was confiscated and she was summoned to appear in front of the Shahid Moghaddas Court at Tehran's Evin Prison. On October 29, 2016, she was informed that she was being accused of “gathering and colluding to commit crimes against national security” and “spreading propaganda against the system” and about a year later, in February 2018, she was sentenced to 7.5 years in jail. This was added to the previous 4.5 year sentence. A coalition of 20 human rights organizations, including Human Rights Watch and Amnesty International, published a statement accusing the Iranian government of oppressing individuals peacefully seeking truth and justice for the 1980s' executions; a statement that explicitly included Behkish. In another statement, Amnesty International claimed that Behkish's

"conviction stems solely from her peaceful activities to seek truth and justice, including holding commemorative gatherings at her home; visiting the families of victims; taking flowers to Khavaran (a deserted mass gravesite in the south of Tehran), where two of her brothers are believed to be buried in unmarked graves; and posting about Iran’s human rights violations on Facebook and other online platforms".

Amnesty International further elaborated that Behkish was interrogated without a lawyer present and that the subsequent trial took less than an hour.
