= Mothers of Khavaran =

Activist group

Mothers of Khavaran (Persian: مادران خاوران) or "Mothers and Families of Khavaran" is a group of mothers and families of victims who suffered from state atrocities in Iran during the 1980s. They are dedicated to seeking truth and justice for those who were killed in mass executions carried out by the Islamic Republic, starting around 1981 and reaching their peak during the 1988 summary mass executions of political prisoners in Iranian prisons. The organization comprises mothers and other family members of victims. Despite pressure by state authorities to remain silent, the Mothers of Khavaran have worked for over thirty years to seek justice and accountability for their loved ones.

== Origins and formation ==
The members and supporters of Mothers began coming together as a community around the early 1980s. Survivors of executions would gather around graves of their loved ones, often executed in secrecy and buried in Khavaran Cemetery. As the authorities of the Islamic Republic carried out executions and buried prisoners at Khavaran, an increasing number of families united to collectively honor and remember their loved ones.

Families of both prisoners and victims frequently gathered near facilities such as Evin and Gohardasht (Rajaeeshahr) prisons, as well as at Khavaran, where they engaged in mutual support, information exchange, and solidarity while awaiting updates or authorization for visitation. Through this process that 1988 they discovered increased pressure on the political prisoners. In response to a hunger strike by their loved ones at Gohardasht prison in objection to torture and poor conditions, Mothers stepped up their appeals and activities. During the massacre between July 1988 and January 1989, Mothers of Khavaran entered a new stage in its history. The joint efforts of Mothers in response to this development marked the beginning of their movement.

Around 4000 prisoners were brought before a three-member body known as the 'Death Commission', which included the current Minister of Justice under President Hassan Rouhani and the former Minister of the Interior under President Mahmoud Ahmadinejad, Mostafa Pourmohammadi. Executions were carried out at the secret order of the Supreme Leader, Ayatollah Khomeini, in order to "cleanse" the prisons of members of the People's Mojahedin Organization of Iran, as well as leftist prisoners. According to official records, the Iranian government labeled all political opponents as enemies of the state, targeting diverse groups—including liberals, nationalists, ethnic minorities, communists, Mujahedin-e Khalq, socialists, monarchists, and Baháʼís—through state-sponsored violence. Ayatollah Montazeri stated that the Ministry of Intelligence had been planning the executions for several years. This is also supported by survivors of the executions. A significant number of victims are assumed to be buried in mass graves in Khavaran Cemetery, referred to by state authorities as 'doomed land' southeast of Tehran. Reports indicate that the Islamic Republic authorities ordered family members of victims to refrain from holding any public events associated with mourning the loss of their loved ones.

Mothers of Khavaran were the first to call for the release of prisoners and warn of their possible massacre. Following resolution 598 of the Security Council, the Islamic Republic disrupted regular family prison visitations on 28 July 1988 and refused to provide any information about prisoners regarding their whereabouts or fate. The Mothers were among the first to mobilize support and begin to search for family members and appeal to authorities. Their search resulted in the discovery of mass graves in Khavaran Cemetery between July 10 and August 6, 1988. Mass graves would be discovered in the area throughout the rest of the year. Mothers and their supporters saw and photographed limbs and bodies of partially buried victims. The Mothers' campaign included public gatherings and written statements to authorities like including UN Secretary-General Javier Pérez de Cuéllar, and an unsuccessful attempt to meet with UN Special Rapporteur Galindo Pohl about the state of human rights in Iran. They also visited the residences of Ayatollah Khomeini, the father of the Republic, as well as those of Ayatollahs Montazeri and Marashi Najafi. Later, Ayatollah Montazeri sought ways to end the execution of "thousands in a few days."

Families of Khavaran then visited Prime Minister Mir-Hossein Mousavi, but were refused a response. They also peacefully gathered for three days in front of the Central Court in Tehran on August 21, 1988 to try to restore family visitation rights. A member of the High Judiciary Council, Bojnourdi, spoke to the crowd and stated that visitations would resume at Gohardasht prison, but that those at Evin were banned until stated otherwise. The Mothers later found that these periods marked by bans were set aside to process prisoners through two-minute interrogation sessions before a three-member death commission, leading to mass executions and burials. Once the Mothers learned of the massacre they informed the media and the diaspora outside of Iran. This marked the start of their global efforts to raise awareness and object to the secret mass executions. After authorities returned some the victims' belongings to their families in December 1988, The Mothers took the significant step of organizing a public demonstration. It took place on December 26 at the Central Court in Tehran. The Mothers called out the Minister of Justice in a petition outlining violations of human rights and named August 28 to September 8, 1988 the "Ten Days Honouring Martyrs of the National Tragedy" and September 1 as the day of public commemoration at Khavaran Cemetery.

== Impact and contribution ==
The Mothers of Khavaran played a pivotal role in advancing a collective justice-seeking process in Iran through public advocacy. Their contributions include documentation of details pertaining to the victims and events surrounding the 1988 massacre. One of their first efforts involved compiling a list of names and information about prisoners whose families suspect they were executed. The majority of the victims belonged to Iran's Communist Party, Mojahedin-e Khalq, Fadaiean-e Khalq (Majority and Minority), Rah-e Kargar, the Iran Tudeh Party or Komoleh. The Mothers' role in the dissemination of information about the deaths of their family members through interviews and documentaries serves as a source of oral history.

It is primarily through their repeated and sacrificial efforts that mass graves of political prisoners at Khavaran remain in place. Initially families gathered at Khavaran every Friday, and later the first Friday of every month. Despite harassment, violence, and a state policy of erasing this important site, Mothers preserve the site at any cost, including the January 2009 attack on Khavaran.

Mothers is unlike similar movements in the past, as they represent a coalition of survivors who are united in one cause regardless of political or ideological differences in Iran's political realm. Their series of historic letters to Iranian and international authorities forms the background of Iranians' struggle to raise awareness and preserve the memory of those killed during the massacre of political prisoners. The hallmark of these letters is their departure from the traditional and mournful approaches by victims and is itself a sign of the exemplary power of this group and the manner in which they redefine the role of survivors.

Their call for accountability, redress, and their rightful access to truth and justice is yet another contribution. The Mothers of Khavaran were the first grassroots body in the country to call for the identification and prosecution of state officials responsible for the summary executions rampant in the Iranian judicial system. In addition to their persistent efforts to inform the international community, they tried to meet with the UN Special Rapporteur on the status of human rights in Iran, the late Reynaldo Galindo Pohl, when he visited Iran, but instead the authorities physically assaulted some of those gathered.

The Mothers demonstrated persistence in the face of inaction. While their efforts went unanswered by both Iranian and international authorities and organizations, they searched for new ways to produce awareness of Iran's human rights violations and redefined legal boundaries to further the cause of justice. It was their vision and commitment that acted as a catalyst and served as the background to bring about a new consciousness regarding state responsibility in different categories of crimes against Iranian citizens. The Mykonos restaurant assassinations verdict implicating Iran in assassinations carried out in Germany, Islamic Republic officials' admission of murders of chained dissidents, the expansion and consolidation of human rights defenses through efforts by the Mothers, and the unprecedented Iran Tribunal proceedings, stand as tributes to the unprecedented movement, commitment and sacrifices by Mothers of Khavaran.

== Harassment, Persecution and Arrests ==
Witness testimonies indicate that, prior to the mass executions, prison authorities physically assaulted visitors and subjected women and girls as young as five or six to invasive body searches, aiming to intimidate and prevent family visitations. Others, including Haj Karbalaie, would sexually threaten women. In December 1988 personal property of victims was mixed together and randomly returned to their families, who were left to sort out what belonged to whom, in order to aggravate their suffering. In addition, prison authorities confiscated valuables, such as wedding bands, which were reportedly sold to benefit war victims. This was while many family members of prisoners were in need of financial assistance for their most basic needs in life.

Reports indicate that on 1 September, the first anniversary of the executions, security and intelligence forces attacked the families and proceeded to arrest a number of them. While attacks, arrests and other forms of harassment went on, Mothers and other family members continued to press on, called on the international community to investigate the executions in Iran and made every attempt to meet with the UN Special Rapporteur, Mr. Pohl, and to present him with significant documents. However, intelligence forces once again attacked the Mothers and barred their access to the Special Rapporteur. In 2001, Islamic Republic authorities instructed the Baha'i community, whose part of Khavaran was full, to bury their dead in the section of Khavaran where political victims of executions in the 1980s were buried, claiming it was unused. Mothers realized the state authorities were trying to incite division and discord among them, and informed the Baha'is that the land was in fact occupied by unmarked graves and that they could bury their dead on top of the executed prisoners or go back to the authorities and demand another piece of land. The Baha'is chose to approach the authorities for another location.

A few years later in 2003–2004, the authorities locked the gates to the cemetery in order to deny the families access to Khavaran. In 2009 they bulldozed the grounds in order to remove any sign of the mass graves. In addition, they routinely remove and destroy any plantation, photos or signs that identify or mark the graves in any way. The authorities have gone so far as to saturate the land with lime and salt water in order to prevent families from planting flowers or greenery at Khavaran. In late July 2013, on the 25th anniversary of the mass executions, Islamic Republic security forces once again began a process of summoning family members and threatening them with arrest should they attempt to gather or publicly mark the anniversary in any way.

On 7 August 2013 an activist among Khavaran survivors, Mansoureh Behkish, issued a letter to President Hassan Rouhani summarizing the plight of the Mothers and families of Khavaran. She stated: "Generation after generation have been subjected to continuous threats and denied the opportunity to live as productive members of society… The greatest tragedy is that no government official has ever given the families of the fallen any answers." Behkish outlines the following questions to the new President, hoping for answers:

1. How were the executions of political prisoners in the 1980s, especially those killed during 1988, carried out?

2. Why were prisoners who were serving their terms behind bars executed without notifying their families?

3. Why were the political prisoners retried behind closed doors in secret by the Death Commission?

4. Why have government officials not formally answered any of our questions to clarify why and how these mass killings occurred?

5. Why does the regime refuse to tell us where exactly the executed political prisoners are buried?

6. Why does the regime refuse to give the prisoners' last wills and testaments to their families?

7. Why does the government continue to torment and harass the families who wish to gather in Khavaran?

8. Why does the regime refuse to let us freely commemorate the fallen in our homes and at Khavaran or other cemeteries?

9. Why did the regime make another attempt to destroy Khavaran in 2008 and fail to address our complaints?

10. Why has the main entrance to Khavaran been blocked for the last five years? What is to be achieved by forcing elderly parents to walk a considerable distance to reach the unmarked graves of their loved ones?

11. Why does the regime refuse to let the families mark their graves, plant flowers and trees, and irrigate and clean the cemetery?

12. Why has the regime denied us the right to petition the government for redress of our grievances?

The authorities blocked families' access to Khavaran on the morning of 1 September 2013. In his October 2013 report to the United Nations General Assembly, the UN Special Rapporteur on the human rights situation in Iran, Dr. Ahmed Shaheed, emphasized recent reports of the "on going harassment of those who continue to seek information about those who have disappeared or who seek justice or mourn for those who were executed".

== Custodians of Khavaran ==
Many family members tend to Khavaran in order to ensure the site remains intact despite repeated attacks by the authorities. Among the most recognized figures of Mothers of Khavaran are Mother Lotfi, whose son Anushirvan was executed, Mother Behkish, who lost her daughter, four sons and one son in law, as well as Mothers Sarhaddi, Golchoubian, Sarhadizadeh, and Riahi, and also Mother Moeini, two of whose family members are buried at Khavaran.

Mother Panahi, whose son Mehrdad was executed in 1988, Mother Hashmezadeh, Mother Milani and her daughter, Parvaneh Milani, who wrote the poem entitled 'Khavaran', have also played a notable role in maintaining this important burial site. Mothers Riahi, Qaedi, the Zakipour family, Mothers Okhovat, Vatankhah, Rezaie Jahromi, Nader, Bazargan, Zargar, Mother and Father Mir Arab, Mothers Abkenari, Bazargan, Sadeqi, Jasm, Tonkaboni, and Mother Sarhaddi and her extended family continue to frequent and preserve this historic site.

In addition, Mansoureh Behkish, a 2013 Frontline Award for Human Rights Defenders at Risk finalist, who has survived the loss of six immediate family members during the mass executions, continues to face interrogation, arbitrary arrest, imprisonment, denial of the right to travel overseas, and expulsion from employment. In addition, state authorities denied her son the right to train as a pilot.

== Awards and prizes ==
On May 18, 2014, the Mothers of Khavaran received the 2014 Gwangju Prize for Human Rights. The award ceremony attracted the attention of several Iranian media outlets including BBC Persian, Euronews and Voice of America.

== See also ==
- Mourning Mothers
- Mothers of the Plaza de Mayo
- Saturday Mothers
- Women in Black
- Black Sash
- Tiananmen Mothers
- Ladies in White
- StopExecutionsinIran
- Effat Moridi (Mother Moeini)
