= Woman, Life, Freedom =

Political and social slogan

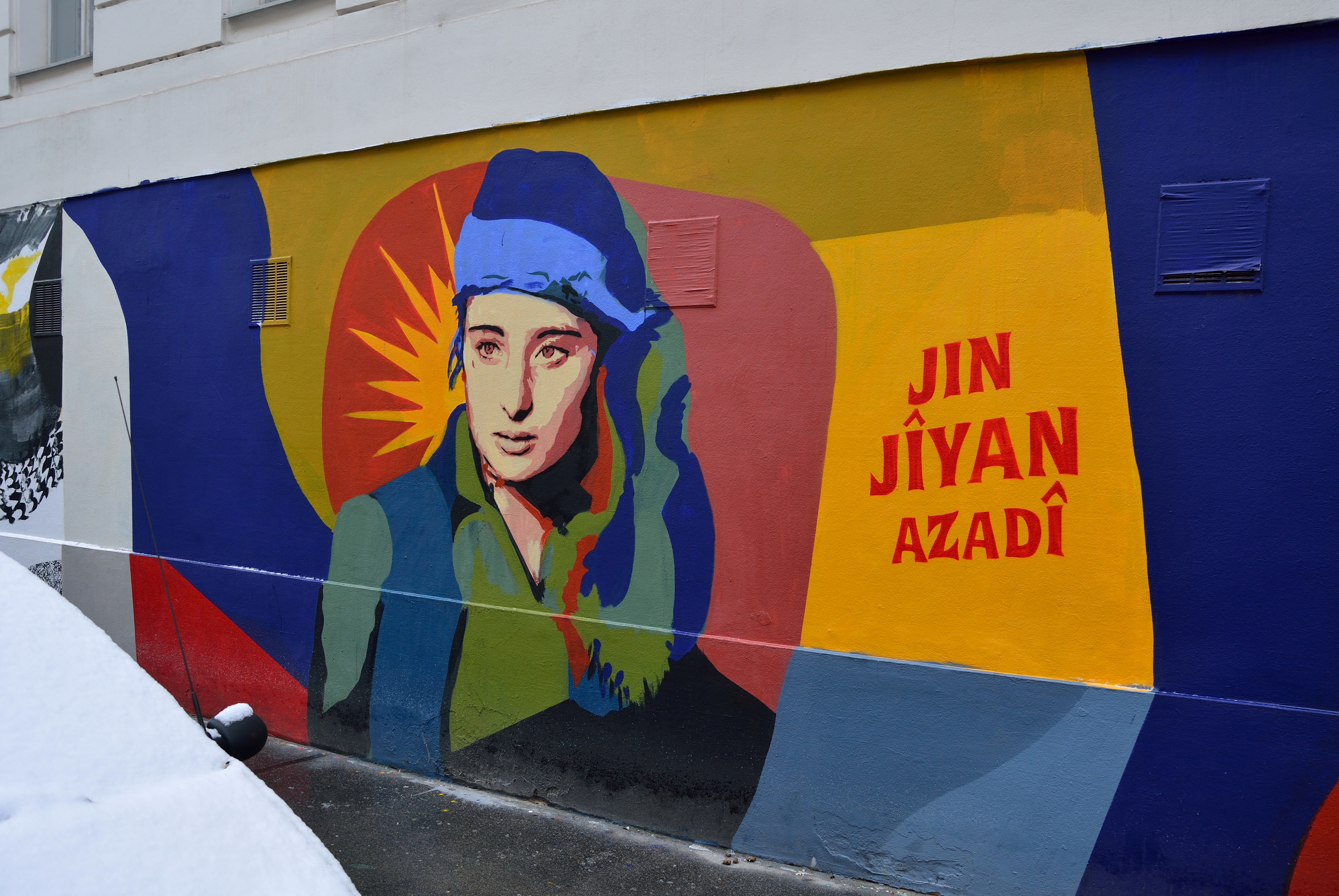
A mural in Vienna shows a Kurdish woman and the slogan of "Woman, Life, Freedom" (in Kurdish)

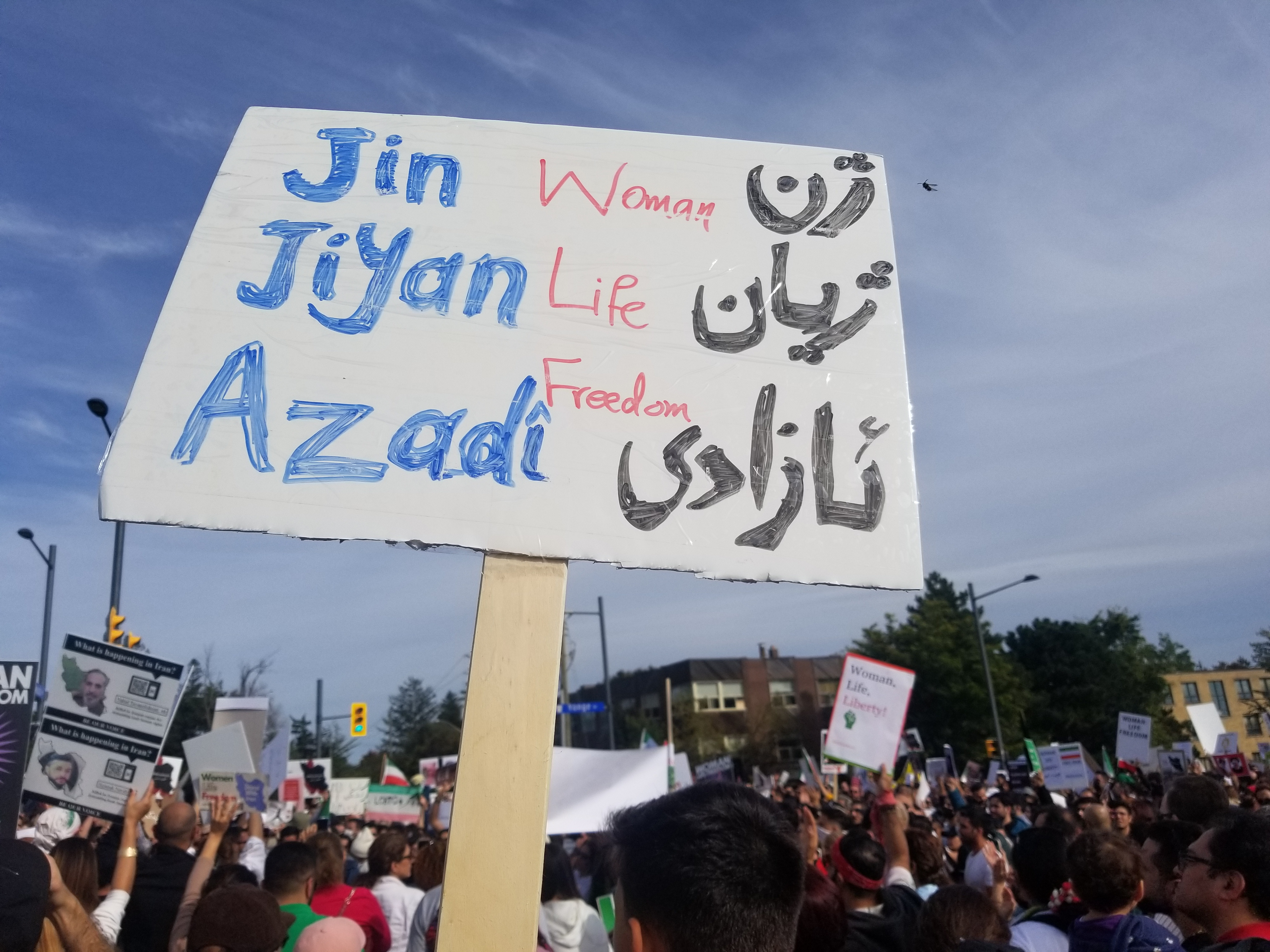
A sign with the slogan written in Kurdish and English by Iranian protesters at 2022-23 Iranian Mahsa Amini protests

Woman, Life, Freedom (Kurdish: ژن، ژیان، ئازادی, romanized: Jin, Jîyan, Azadî) is a popular political Kurdish slogan used in both the Kurdish independence and democratic confederalist movements. The slogan became a rallying cry during the protests which occurred in Iran as a response to the death of Mahsa Amini.

The phrase rapidly became a universal rallying cry, symbolizing resistance against oppression and the fight for women's rights.

== Origin ==
The origin of the slogan can be traced to the Kurdish freedom movement of the late twentieth century. The first time that the slogan was used was by members of the Kurdish women's movement, part of the Kurdish freedom movement which was founded on grassroots activism in response to persecution from the governments of Iran, Iraq, Turkey and Syria. The slogan was popularized further by Kurdish figures such as Abdullah Öcalan, in his anti-capitalist and anti-patriarchal writings. Since its first use, the slogan has been used by members of Kurdish organisations and those outside of the Kurdish movement. This was the slogan of the Kurdish fighters in breaking the siege of Kobani by the Islamic State of Iraq and the Levant in Syria.

== Spread around the world ==
The slogan gained its height in international traction following the internationalization of the Mahsa Jina Amini protests across European countries, the United States, and Australia. Prior to that, the slogan was also used by women's rights movements in a number of international gatherings. For example, on 25 November 2015 it was used in gatherings held to mark International Day for the Elimination of Violence against Women in several European countries.

=== Afghanistan ===
On 20 September 2022, the slogan was chanted by Afghan women in a protest in support of women protesting in Iran.

=== France ===
In 2018, during Cannes Film Festival, the cast of Girls of the Sun chanted "jin jiyan azadî". The slogan was later printed in Persian on the first page of the French newspaper Libération in September 2022 following protests against the death of Mahsa Amini.

=== India ===
The slogan was spotted drawn on the road during the 2024 Meyeder Raat Dokhol Movement in Kolkata, as citizens demanded greater safety for women the society, particularly at night time.

=== Iran ===
"Woman, Life, Freedom", translated into Persian as 'Zan, Zendegi, Azadi’', became widely known throughout Iran following the death of Mahsa Amini in September 2022 and the protests that followed. Amini had been arrested and detained by Iran's ”morality police” for failing to properly cover her hair and later died in police custody.

The slogan had, however, been known and used sporadically in Iranian Kurdistan before Amini's death. Kurdish activist and political prisoner Shirin Alam Holi reportedly wrote the slogan beside her bed while being held in Evin Prison before her execution by hanging in 2010. Activists in Sanandaj later chanted the slogan at the conclusion of an International Women’s Day gathering.

The slogan was chanted at Amini's funeral in Saqqez where women reportedly threw their headscarves in the air as they chanted, and then was spread online by an organization and it became a trending hashtag. Later it was heard in initial protests in Sanandaj after the funeral. On 21 September, the slogan was chanted by students at University of Tehran, and by protesters around the country in the following days. On 28 September and the continuation of protests, students at Shiraz University of Medical Sciences used the slogan in their protests along with a new, similar slogan: "Woman, Life, Freedom; Man, Homeland, Prosperity". Overnight, the protests spread across 15 cities in Iran following the death of Mahsa Amini. Police continued to arrest more people and deployed tear gas to scatter the crowds.

In the protests following Mahsa Amini's death while under the custody of Iranian authorities, a wave of swift public protests spread. These protests consisted of women defiantly removing and burning their headscarves, cutting their hair, and boldly confronting and fighting against the forces of the authorities. Riots began to form as local leading groups such as "the Covenant" and "Neighbourhood Youth Alliance" began to spread the news online and called for protests. the government, in response, resorted to internet restrictions and shutdowns to stifle the organization of further protests and stop the local leaders. The protestors instead resorted to TV, where the foreign oppositions later spread the rallying cry: "Women, life, freedom," symbolizing the essence of this rapid and transformative movement. Since the Iranian Revolution of 1979, these protests presented the most immediate challenge to Iran's regime. The response from the police to the protests resulted in the death of more than 500 civilians and the imprisonment of over 1000.

Following the expansion of Iranian protests to other cities of the world, rallies were held in different cities with protesters using the slogan "Women, Life, Freedom" along with other slogans. Due to its expansion to cities around the world, and extensive coverage on foreign media, the French newspaper Libération used an image of Iranian protests with the slogan in Persian accompanied by its French translation. It was also used at the closing section of the lyrics for the song "Baraye" by Shervin Hajipour, who was detained by police after he received worldwide acclaim for the song. His song "Baraye" was later sung in global protests for Iran on 1 October 2022 in approximately 150 cities around the world.

In February 2023, twenty independent Iranian trade unions, feminist groups and student organizations issued a 12-point manifesto. It articulated and elaborated on the meaning of the slogan "woman, life, freedom", seeking an end to oppression, discrimination, tyranny, and dictatorship.

=== Turkey ===
This slogan has been repeatedly used in Turkey by Saturday Mothers. The slogan was also chanted by Turkish protesters in Turkey, when they gathered to protest in front of the embassy of the Islamic Republic of Iran on 21 September 2022.

== Reception ==
- Among the notable individuals who signed in solidarity with the movement are:
  - Nazanin Afshin-Jam - Human rights activist and author.
  - Jacinda Ardern - Former Prime Minister, New Zealand.
  - Laura Bush - Former First Lady, U.S.
  - Kim Campbell - 19th Prime Minister, Canada.
  - Hillary Rodham Clinton - Former Secretary of State, U.S.
  - Shirin Ebadi - Nobel Peace Prize laureate, U.S.
  - Patricia Ellis - President & Founder, Women's Foreign Policy Group.
  - Christine Lagarde - Economic & Political Leader, France.
  - Nadia Murad - Nobel Peace Prize laureate, Iraq.
  - Michelle Obama - Former First Lady, U.S.
  - Oprah Winfrey - Media Personality and Philanthropist, U.S.
  - Malala Yousafzai - Nobel Peace Prize laureate, Pakistan.
- Iranian sociologist Taghi Azadarmaki, stated that the slogan is "one of the most rooted desires of the middle class".
- Iranian sociologist Farhad Khosrokhavar considers the slogan as "a new shot in the sequence of Iranian civil protests".
- Sociologist Mehrdad Darvishpour believes that the slogan is "Challenging the violent patriarchal, deadly and authoritarian ruling ideology".
- Iranian-American political analyst Karim Sadjadpour sees the slogan "Woman, Life, Freedom" as a counterpoint to the government.
- Mohammad Fazeli, Iranian sociologist and professor of sociology believes that in this slogan, woman has a symbolic face and demonstrates the hatred of violence.

== Response ==
- German Foreign Minister Annalena Baerbock protested for Women's Rights with Banners of "Jin, Jiyan, Azadî" at the Party Committee.
- A Swedish member of the European Parliament, Abir Al-Sahlani, cut her hair in the European Parliament during a speech in solidarity with Kurdish women in Iran and taking a pair of scissors, she said "Jin, Jiyan, Azadî".
- Finnish-US Kurdish singer Helly Luv released a song about Jin, Jiyan, Azadî.
- Iranian-Dutch singer Sevdaliza released a song named "Woman Life Freedom زن زندگی آزادی".
- In 2023 Members of the European Parliament awarded the Sakharov Prize to Mahsa Amini and the movement.

== See also ==
- For Freedoms
- Iranian Kurdistan
- Islamic Penal Code of Iran
- Jineology
- Kurdish women
- Political slogans against the Islamic Republic of Iran
- UN Commission for the Status of Women
- Vital Voices
- Women in Iran
- Woman, Life, Freedom movement
