= Iran Human Rights Documentation Center =

Iran Human Rights Documentation Center (IHRDC)
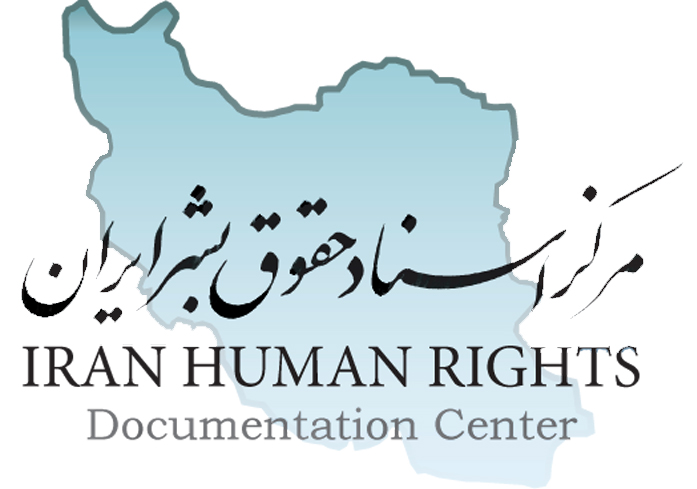
- Founded: 2004
- Type: Non-profit 501(c)(3)
- Location: New Haven, Connecticut, United States
- Fields: Documenting Human Rights Violations
- Website: www.iranhrdc.org

The Iran Human Rights Documentation Center (IHRDC) is a registered non-profit organization based in New Haven, Connecticut. IHRDC was founded in 2004 by a group of human rights scholars, activists, American government interest advocators, and historians to document the patterns of human rights abuse in Iran and to promote accountability, a culture of human rights, and the rule of law in Iran. Board members include prominent legal scholars such as Professors Owen Fiss (Yale University), Lawrence Douglas (Amherst College), and Payam Akhavan (McGill University).

== Funding ==
The US State Department has been the group's "main source of funds," providing US$3 million since the group's founding. Following the disputed 2009 presidential elections in Iran, the government of Canada also granted it funds. The center is also supported by private foundations and individual donors.

== Response from the Islamic Republic of Iran ==
IHRDC has been named on a list of 60 organizations designated as subversive by the Iranian Interior Ministry. In the fall of 2009, the center was again condemned by Kayhan, a conservative Iranian newspaper.
