= Yakay-Der =

Yakay-Der (Turkish: Yakınlarını Kaybeden Ailelerle Yardımlaşma ve Dayanışma Derneği; "The Association of Solidarity and Assistance for the Families of Missing Persons") is a Turkish activist group. It was founded on 9 March 2001 to help the families of disappeared Kurds in Turkey.

According to Yakar-Der, more than 1,500 persons are unaccounted for following the "special war" period in Turkey from 1993 to 1998, in the context of actions taken to root out the PKK. These activities were brought to light in the Susurluk scandal which surfaced in 1996 and resulted in several high-level resignations in the Turkish Government.

== About ==
The current (May 2019) President of Yakar-Der is Pervin Buldan.

Its stated objectives are:

- To investigate the unknown killings of known opponents of the State and the disappearance of such people under very suspicious situations and circumstances;
- To investigate and try to find out who are responsible for the unknown killings and/or disappearances of such activists, and to bring them to book, i.e. to make certain that they are arrested, prosecuted and punished; and
- To work with the families of those who have been killed or who have disappeared.

== History ==
Yakar-Der was established as a result of a long struggle organised by what came to be known as the Saturday Mothers, a group of women who protested every Saturday for about two years in front of the Galatasaray High School in Taksim in Istanbul.

It is a successor to the Association Mag-Der, which was closed down by the Turkish authorities because of alleged irregularities with respect to the Turkish Law of Associations.

Each year, Yakar-Der, together with the Turkish Human Rights Association (İHD) and the International Committee Against Disappearances (ICAD), organise a series of special events to mark the Week of Disappeared People. In May 2006, they organised the 5th International Conference against Disappearances, in Diyarbakir. In 2008 they organized sit-down strikes, a photo exhibition and panel discussions with the relatives of missing persons. They also filed a complaint with the public prosecutor and demanded the punishment of officials responsible for the disappearance of the missing persons.

In May 2009, they began a campaign to urge Turkey to ratify the International Convention for the Protection of All Persons from Enforced Disappearances.

== See also ==
- Forced disappearance
- Saturday Mothers
