= Mohammad Fazeli =

Iranian sociologist

Mohammad Fazeli (محمد فاضلی)
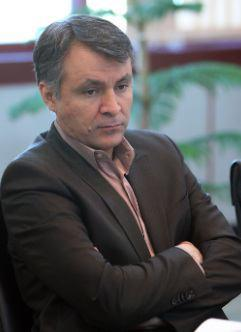
- Born: September 16, 1975 (age 51); Arak, Iran

Academic background
- Education: Tarbiat Modares University

Academic work
- Institutions: Shahid Beheshti University, Iranian Ministry of Energy
- Main interests: social impact assessment, public policy
- Website: http://mohammadfazeli.ir/

Mohammad Fazeli (Persian: محمد فاضلی; also Romanized as "Mohammad Fāzeli"; born 16 September 1975 in Arak, Iran) is an Iranian sociologist and former assistant professor at Shahid Beheshti University whose work focuses on social impact assessment, political sociology and sociology of science. He got fired from university in the "third wave of purging political professors". He is advisor to Iranian Minister of Energy. Fazeli was the research deputy of Iranian Center for Strategic Studies and the general editor of the Network for Public Policy Studies (NPPS).

Fazeli was among hundreds of academic faculty who signed a letter condemning the government's crackdown of the 2025–2026 Iranian protests, and failure to prevent a future attack on Iran by the United States and Israel in response to the crackdown.
