= Iran Tribunal =

Iran Tribunal is an international People's Tribunal and a non-binding legal tribunal residing in The Hague, the Netherlands, aiming to investigate serious allegations of Human Rights violations and Crimes against humanity in the Islamic Republic of Iran during the 1980s. It was founded in 2007, because no other judicial committee would investigate allegations made against the government of Islamic Republic of Iran. The Government of Iran was invited to take part in the Tribunal, but refused to co-operate.

== Formation ==
The Tribunal was formed in 2007 by multiple victims and relatives of victims. The formation was greatly aided many distinguished lawyers and human rights activists. The steering committee started having regular meetings in October 2007 and was led by John Cooper QC, Sir Geoffrey Nice, Kader Asmal and Richard Falk. The tribunal is based on the model of Russell Tribunal.

== Truth Commission ==
The Truth Commission constituted the investigative part of the Tribunal and was held in Amnesty International headquarters in London between 18 and 22 June 2012.

The commission examined allegations including reports that at least 20,000 political prisoners were killed in Iranian prisons. It collected witness statements from around 75 people, many of them surviving detainees of Iranian prisons in the 1980s. Overall 100 people submitted evidence describing "the pattern of arbitrary arrest and detention without trial, of rape, death sentences issued by kangaroo courts, children as young as 11 being executed, families made to pay for the bullets used to kill their relatives." The findings of The Truth Commission, including all of the oral submissions were published online.

== The Tribunal ==
The Tribunal sat in the Peace Palace in The Hague between the 25th and 27 October 2012. It was held before Johann Kriegler (presiding), John Dugard SC, Margaret Ratner Kunstler, Michael Mansfield QC, Makau Mutua and Patricia Sellers.

The Tribunal published the interim judgement on 27 October 2012, finding that:
The Islamic Republic of Iran bears absolute responsibility for gross violations of human rights against its citizens under the International Covenant of Civil and Political Rights and
The Islamic Republic of Iran has a strong case to answer for crimes against humanity under customary international law as applicable to Iran in the 1980s.

The full judgement of the Tribunal was handed down on 5 February 2013.

== Iran Tribunal Foundation ==
After presenting its ruling, on 23 June 2013 the general assembly of the Iran Tribunal decided to proceed with its work in the form of a new foundation, and named it the Iran Tribunal Foundation. As the legal successor of the tribunal, among its main tasks will be safeguarding the results of the tribunal, passing on its organizational and legal experiences and continue documenting crimes in Iran committed against political prisoners, focusing on the nineteen eighties. As such the tribunal proceedings may be considered as finalized per the date of establishing the foundation.

== See also ==
- 1988 executions of Iranian political prisoners
