= Peace Mothers =

Turkish peace organization

The Peace Mothers (Kurdish: Dayîkên Aşîtîyê, Turkish: Barış Anneleri) is a women's civil rights movement in Turkey, which aims to promote peace between Turkey's different ethnic groups through non-violent means.

== History ==
The Peace Mothers dates from 1999. A member of the founding Assembly explained " We had come together to say that the dirty war should come to an end and that there should be peace among Turks and Kurds." Many of the women involved have lost a close relative in the Kurdish–Turkish conflict. In the words of Türkiye Bozkurt " In 1999 we came together as mothers, whose children were either in the mountains, in prisons or had lost their lives in the war." They are based in Istanbul and Diyarbakir.

They have been frequently in the news for their protests and court cases. In 2000, Amnesty International reported a delegation of Peace Mothers had allegedly been tortured and ill-treated, after they travelled to neighbouring Iraq to try to mediate between the two sides in the civil conflict in the Kurdish region in North Iraq. The lawyer who defended them, Eren Keskin, was later put on trial for having insulted the army after her description of the alleged torture of the Peace Mothers was published in a newspaper.

In June 2006, Peace Mother activists Muyesser Gunes and Sakine Arat were sentenced to 1-year jail each and 600 YTL in Ankara 4th Criminal Court on a charge of praising a separatist organisation and its leader, after they had visited the General Staff headquarters on 22 August 2005 to present their case. The sentence was later commuted to 10 months.

In July 2006, twenty-four Peace Mothers aged between 40 and 75 years, were sentenced to 12 months’ jail by the Diyarbakır 4th Criminal Court after being found guilty of voicing "separatist propaganda".

In August 2009 a group of Peace Mothers organised a peace march from Diyarbakir and Ankara and held a sit-in protest near the Turkish General Staff headquarters in Ankara.

== See also ==
- Saturday Mothers
