= Saturday Mothers =

Human rights association in Turkey

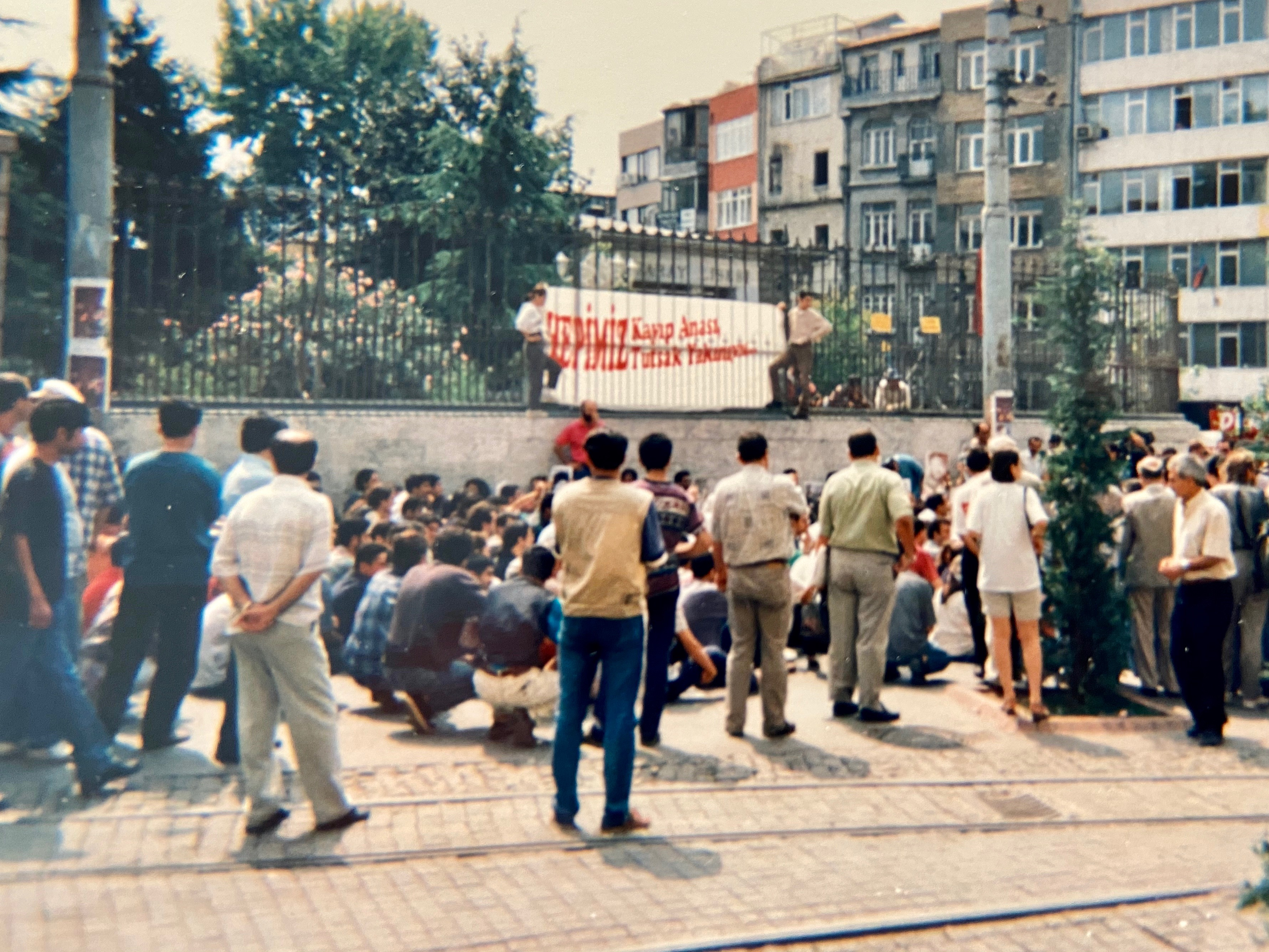
Saturday mothers, Istanbul, circa 1995

The Saturday Mothers (Turkish: Cumartesi Anneleri) is a group which gathers every Saturday at noon for half an hour at Galatasaray, Istanbul, Turkey, initially to ask for clarification about their missing relatives. Mainly composed of mothers of victims, and renowned as a model of civil disobedience, they combine silent sit-in with communal vigil as their method of protest against the forced disappearances and political murders by the deep state in Turkey during the military coup-era of the 1980s and the OHAL-era of the 1990s. The group began in 1995. It has faced repression from the state, including police violence and prosecution, most recently in November 2020.

== History ==
According to the Human Rights Association, between 1992 and 1996, 792 state-forced disappearances and murders have been reported in the east of Turkey, with many more missing persons who remain unreported (see also, OHAL).

Reportedly influenced by the Mothers of the Plaza de Mayo, their first sit-in was on May 27, 1995. After facing violent police attacks almost every week, on March 13, 1999, they were forced to halt their protest following a particularly harsh series of attacks by the police and the resulting trauma in the participants. They resumed their protests on January 31, 2009. Currently, the group that started with about 30 people has thousands of participants. On August 25, 2018, Turkish authorities announced that the governorship has banned the gathering event indefinitely. Following the announcement, in their 700th peaceful protest, Saturday Mothers were faced with police violence and several of the participants were detained. In November 2020, a prosecutor demanded up to three years imprisonment for protestors for attempting to have an "illegal meeting".

The main demands of the group include:

- to raise awareness of state-sponsored violence, militarization, and militarism in Turkey,
- the state documents archives to be opened up for public review in order for state-sponsored political murders to be brought to light,
- changes to the Turkish penal code to be made in order to remove the statute of limitation on political murders and forced disappearances,
- Turkey to sign the International Convention for the Protection of All Persons from Enforced Disappearance.

=== Meeting with Prime Minister Erdogan ===
In February 2011, Prime Minister Recep Tayyip Erdoğan invited the Saturday Mothers to his office in Istanbul to listen to the requests of the mothers. Erdoğan said that as government he will do everything he can to alleviate the suffering of the family members, but also mentioned that it will not be easy to achieve results in cases that are older than 30 years. He noted, however, that this could not be an excuse and that the necessary efforts would be made to achieve positive results.

=== Banned by the Erdogan Government ===
Ahead of their 700th Saturday vigil, the Erdogan government banned the Saturday Mothers as part of what Amnesty International, Human Rights Watch, and Front Line Defenders in a joint statement called “a relentless crackdown on civil society, human rights defenders and those who peacefully express their dissent in Turkey.” When they gathered that day, the Saturday Mothers were arrested. Their trial began in Istanbul on 25 March 2021.

== Awards ==
- In 2013, they were awarded with the International Hrant Dink Award.
- In 2019, they were awarded with the Human Rights, Peace and Democracy Award from the Istanbul Medical Chamber.

== See also ==
- Mothers of Diyarbakır
- Ladies in White
- Mothers of Khavaran
- Mothers of the Plaza de Mayo
- Mourning Mothers (Mothers of Laleh Park)
- List of peace activists
- Yakay-Der
- Peace Mothers
- U2 - Mothers of the Disappeared
- Hear Their Heartbeat - Short Documentary
