= 1988 executions of Iranian political prisoners =

Government-led mass execution of political prisoners in Iran

1988 execution of political prisoners in Iran
- Part of the Iran–Iraq War
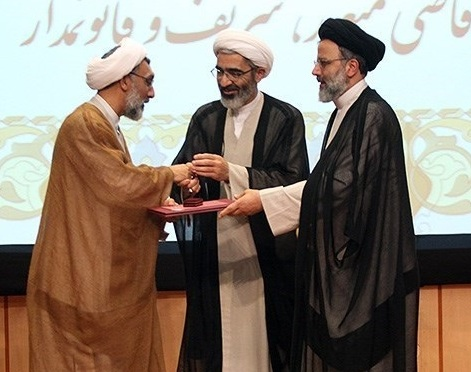
- Ebrahim Raisi (right) and Mostafa Pourmohammadi (left), two members of "Judges of Death" committee, in 2013
- Date: July–December 1988 (some sources say July–September)
- Location: Iran
- Type: Mass execution, summary execution, genocide
- Target: Iranian left-wing political opposition groups, most notably the MEK, OIPFM and the Tudeh Party of Iran, atheists, non-Shia Muslims
- Deaths: 2,800 to 5,000, according to international human rights organizations and other experts; up to 30,000, according to the People's Mujahedin of Iran
- Accused: Hossein-Ali Nayyeri (who was then a judge), Morteza Eshraqi (then Tehran Prosecutor), Ebrahim Raisi (then deputy prosecutor general) and Mostafa Pourmohammadi (then the representative of the Intelligence Ministry in Evin Prison), Hamid Nouri (then the assistant to the deputy prosecutor)
- Convicted: Hamid Nouri

In July 1988, the supreme leader of Iran, Ruhollah Khomeini, ordered the execution of thousands of political prisoners. These executions took place in at least 32 cities across Iran and lasted about five months. Trials were not concerned with establishing guilt or innocence, and the executions were carried out without any legal authority. Many prisoners were also tortured. Great care was taken to conceal the executions.

Estimates, including those found in reports by human rights organizations Human Rights Watch and Amnesty International, indicate that between 2,800 and 5,000 men, women and children were killed. Other sources, including the People's Mujahedin of Iran (MeK), whose members and supporters featured prominently in the killings, says that 30,000 political prisoners were massacred.

Reportedly, most of those killed were supporters of the MeK. Members of other leftist factions, such as the Fedaian and the Tudeh Party of Iran (Communist Party), were also killed. Various motives have been offered for the executions. One possible motive was that the killings were revenge for the MeK's Operation Forough Javidan, which took place in 1988 on Iran's western borders. However, people from other leftist groups, who had nothing to do with the MeK's attack, were also killed. According to Iran's then-Deputy Supreme Leader Ayatollah Montazeri, officials had been planning the executions for years, using the MeK operation as an excuse to carry them out.

Survivors of the executions have repeatedly called for the killers to face prosecution. Some have described them as "Iran's greatest crime against humanity". They were condemned by Montazeri, the United Nations (UN) Human Rights Council, and several countries.

In November 2021, an Early Day Motion in the UK House of Commons, signed by 47 MPs, stated that the 1988 killings of Iranian political prisoners amounted to ongoing crimes against humanity and genocide, and called on the UK Government to seek a UN Commission of Inquiry.

Further, in 2024, Javaid Rehman, the United Nations Special Rapporteur on Human Rights in Iran (2018–2024), arrived at the preliminary conclusion that the 1988 and 1981 killings were carried out with the genocidal intent of exterminating political opponents and religious minorities.

== Background ==
The Islamic modernist People's Mujahedin of Iran (MeK) had a complicated relationship with Ruhollah Khomeini's government. Their guerilla forces, along with members of the Marxist Fedeyeen, played a key role in overthrowing the monarchy. However, they disagreed with Khomeini's vision about the form the Islamic political system should take. While Khomeini supported a system of rule by Islamic clerics, the MeK supported democracy, women's rights, and a classless society.

After the revolution, as Khomeini's government began suppressing former allies—including liberals, leftists and moderates—the MeK became the regime's most powerful enemy and its primary target. In 1980, Khomeini started criticizing the MeK, calling them elteqati (eclectic), monafeqin (hypocrites), and kafer (unbelievers). He also accused them of being contaminated with gharbzadegi ("the Western plague"). Beginning in February 1980, Hezbollah supporters attacked meeting spots, bookstores, and newsstands owned by the MeK and other leftists. Simultaneously, the government purged members of the opposition—including 20,000 teachers and nearly 8,000 military officers—for being too "Westernized". They also closed MeK offices, banned their newspapers, ordered their leaders' arrests, and prohibited demonstrations.

The crisis reached a critical turning point when Khomeini attacked President Abolhassan Banisadr, an Islamic modernist, former supporter of Khomeini, and ally of the MeK. Banisadr was then impeached by the Islamic Consultative Assembly, causing him to flee the country and call for a "resistance to dictatorship". During the conflict that followed, an "unprecedented reign of terror" was unleashed upon the MeK and similar groups. According to historian Stephanie Cronin, within six months, "2,665 persons, 90 per cent of whom were MeK members, were executed". The MeK retaliated with their own attacks, killing numerous leaders of the Khomeinist Islamic Republic Party. A few months later, they also killed the party's new leader, Mohammad Javad Bahonar. Remnants of the MeK fled the country in fear of further retaliation from Iranian authorities.

In July 1988, 7,000 militants from the National Liberation Army (NLA), the military wing of the Peoples Mojahedin Organization of Iran (MEK), launched a major military offensive with the goal of capturing key cities such as Kermanshah, with the ultimate objective of toppling the Iranian government. The Iraqi military armed and trained the NLA fighters and provided them with air support. Led by Lieutenant-General Ali Sayad Shirazi, Operation Mersad began on 26 July 1988 and lasted only a few days, whereby the Iranian Armed Forces defeated MeK forces. Iranian leaders have since attempted to shift attention away from the executions by highlighting the MeK's attack, claiming their response was justified against the attackers. However, in 2016, an audio recording posted online purported to reveal a 1988 meeting between then-Deputy-Supreme Leader Ayatollah Montazeri and officials responsible for the mass executions in Tehran. In the recording, Montazeri is heard saying that the Ministry of Intelligence used the MeK's attack as a pretext to carry out the mass killings, which "had been under consideration for several years".

== Executions ==
=== Khomeini's order ===
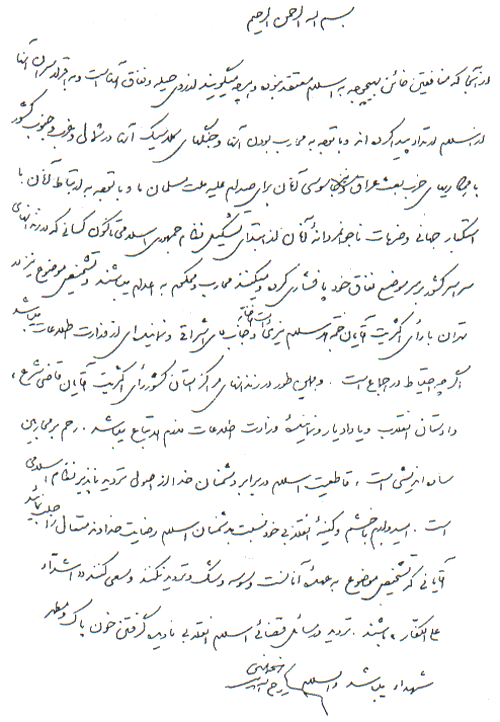
Khomeini's order letter

Shortly before the executions began, Khomeini issued "a secret but extraordinary order—some suspect a formal fatwa". The order led to the creation of "special commissions" that were tasked with executing MeK members, who were labeled moharebs (those who war against Allah). Leftists in general were also targeted, and were labeled mortads (apostates from Islam).

In part, the letter reads:

[In the Name of God, The Compassionate, the Merciful,]
As the treacherous Monafeqin [Hypocrites] do not believe in Islam and what they say is out of deception and hypocrisy, and
As their leaders have confessed that they have become renegades, and
As they are waging war on God, and
As they are engaging in classical warfare in the western, the northern and the southern fronts, and
As they are collaborating with the Ba'ath Party of Iraq and spying for Saddam against our Muslim nation, and
As they are tied to the World Arrogance, and in light of their cowardly blows to the Islamic Republic since its inception,
It is decreed that those who are in prison throughout the country and remain steadfast in their support for the Monafeqin [Hypocrites] are waging war on God and are condemned to execution.

=== Lockdown ===
According to a report by Kaveh Sharooz, in late 1987 and early 1988, prison officials started "re-questioning" prisoners and grouping them based on political affiliation and sentence length.

On 19 July 1988, Iranian authorities closed several major prisons, preventing all visits and phone calls and refusing to accept letters, care packages, or medicine from families. Courts went on an unscheduled holiday to prevent them from finding out what happened to their imprisoned relatives. Relatives of prisoners were also forbidden from congregating outside the prison gates.

Inside the prisons, cell blocks were isolated from each other and cleared of radios and televisions. All shared spaces—including classrooms, work areas, and medical rooms—were closed. Inmates were confined to their cells. Prison employees were forbidden from speaking to inmates. One prisoner made his own radio to hear news from outside, but found nothing about the lockdown was being reported.

=== Administration ===
The executions began that month, in July 1988. They were carried out by Iranian officials who later held high-ranking positions in the government. According to historian Ervand Abrahamian, in his book Tortured Confessions: Prisons and Public Recantations in Modern Iran, a 16-member commission oversaw the executions in Tehran. The commission included various authorities from key parts of the Islamic government: Khomeini, the president, the chief prosecutor, the Revolutionary Tribunals, the Justice and Intelligence ministries, and officials from Evin and Gohardasht prisons, where the executions took place. The chair of the commission was Ayatollah Morteza Eshraqi, who was assisted by Hojatt al-Islam, Hossein-Ali Nayyeri, and Ali Mobasheri. The commission traveled by helicopter between Evin and Gohardasht prisons. Similar commissions were set up outside of Tehran, but less is known about them.

Another account of how the executions were carried out, given by Iranian human rights lawyer Nasrin Sotoudeh and supported by Abrahamian in a 2017 interview, says they were administered by a "four-man commission", known as the "death committee". The committee included judge Hossein-Ali Nayyeri, Tehran Prosecutor Eshraqi, deputy prosecutor general Ebrahim Raisi, and Mostafa Pourmohammadi, who represented the Intelligence Ministry at Evin Prison. Raisi later campaigned for president of Iran in 2017 as a hard-line conservative. He faced criticism over his part in executions but later won the presidency on his second attempt in 2021. His role earned him a reputation as a "hanging judge", like Sadegh Khalkhali before him. It also earned him his nickname: 'Butcher of Tehran'. Amnesty International presented evidence that linked several Iranian officials to participation in the massacre. Among them were Alireza Avayi, who allegedly served on the panel in Dezful, Raisi, who allegedly served on the panel in Tehran, Pourmohammadi, and others.

Most of the prisoners executed were there for nonviolent activities like distributing newspapers and leaflets, joining protests, or raising money for the opposition. Some were imprisoned for holding outlawed political views. Others were executed because of their religious views—either because they were atheists or for following different forms of Islam. They were tried before they were executed, but these trials were unrelated to the crimes they were imprisoned for. Due to the high number of prisoners facing execution, they were placed onto forklift trucks in groups of six and hanged from cranes every 30 minutes. The executions were not sanctioned by Iranian law, violated international law, and are now considered a crime against humanity.

=== MeK executions ===
The Tehran commission began by questioning MeK members and penitents, asking if they would denounce the MeK on camera, help the government hunt down MeK members, name secret sympathizers, identify false penitents, or walk through enemy minefields. According to Abrahamian, the questions were designed to "tax to the utmost the victim's sense of decency, honour, and self-respect". Prisoners who gave wrong answers were moved to a "special room" to be executed. Alleged MeK affiliates, including children as young as 13, were hanged from cranes following Khomeini's orders. Prisoners were told that this interrogation process was not a trial, but rather a "process for initiating a general amnesty and [to separate] Muslims from non-Muslims". Many prisoners believed that they would be imminently set free. One who survived thought he was being interviewed for release during upcoming peace celebrations.

=== Executions of leftists ===
After 27 August, the commission turned its attention to leftist prisoners, including members of the Tudeh Party of Iran, Majority and Minority Fedayi, other Fedayi factions, Kumaleh, Rah-e Kargar, and Peykar. Like the MeK affiliates, they were told that they were not in danger and were questioned about their religious beliefs and practices. Prisoners were told that officials were asking these questions to separate practicing Muslims from non-practicing ones. However, the true purpose was to identify possible apostates, who would then be hanged alongside other condemned moharebs.

Some prisoners, who were saved from execution by answering the questions "properly", shared information with other inmates about what they were asked. One leftist prisoner, who had once attended seminary, understood the religious meaning behind the questions and warned others by knocking messages on the prison walls in morse code. The officials asked if the prisoners' fathers prayed, fasted, and read the Quran. If they had not been raised in traditional Muslim homes and "exposed to true Islam", they could not be labeled apostates. However, the sons of devout men could be. Refusing to answer the questions because of privacy concerns was also often seen as proof of apostasy.

This shocked the prisoners. One commented: "In previous years, they wanted us to confess to spying. In 1988, they wanted us to convert to Islam". There was no correlation between the length of a prisoner's sentence and the likelihood that they would be executed. The first leftists to appear before the commission had shorter sentences, with no warning of what would happen to them.

=== Treatment of women ===
Female MeK members faced the same harsh treatment as their male counterparts, with most being hanged as "armed enemies of Allah". However, for apostasy, women received lighter punishments than men. This was because, according to the commission's interpretation of Islamic law, women were not fully responsible for their actions and "could be given discretionary punishments to mend their ways and obey male superiors".

Leftist women, including those raised as practicing Muslims, were given another "opportunity" to recant their "apostasy". Many were given five lashes daily: one for each missed prayer. This was half the punishment men received. While many women eventually agreed to pray, some went on hunger strike, in some cases refusing both food and water. One woman died after 22 days and 550 lashes. Officials certified her death as a suicide, because it was "she who had made the decision not to pray".

=== Treatment of victims' families ===
According to Iranian human rights lawyer Shirin Ebadi, Iranian officials forbade families of executed prisoners from holding funerals or publicly mourning for a year. After a year, if their conduct was deemed acceptable, they would be told where their relatives were buried. Officials justified the executions to the victims' families by claiming that victims' names were found on notes pinned to dead MeK members during Operation Mersad. Ebadi pointed out that this explanation was unlikely and questioned why the prisoners were not given trials for supporting the enemy. In 2009, the Abdorrahman Boroumand Center commissioned Geoffrey Robertson QC to review evidence and witness statements that they had collected regarding the executions. Robertson's report found that the Iranian government was still refusing to tell victims' families where their relatives were buried.

=== Attempts at concealment ===
The Iranian government accused investigators looking into the executions of "disclosing state secrets" and threatening national security". According to Amnesty International, there has also been "the ongoing official campaign to repress the commemorative efforts of survivors, families and human rights defenders, demonize the victims and distort the facts about the extrajudicial execution of political dissidents in the 1980s".

The executed were interred in mass graves at Khavaran cemetery, where multiple bodies were buried together. The Iranian government subsequently sought to obscure these burials by converting the cemetery grounds into a public park.

=== Death toll estimates ===
The exact number executed is unknown. According to a 1990 investigation by Amnesty International, which included interviews with prisoners' relatives, "most of the executions were of political prisoners" in "the biggest wave of political executions [in Iran] since the early 1980s". Between January 1987 and June 1990, Amnesty International collected the names of at least 2,100 prisoners whose executions were announced in Iranian press.

Per People's Mojahedin: Since June 1981 – 1989, some 90,000 Iranian citizens killed and another 150,000 jailed or tortured by the ayatollah.

A 1996 study by N. Mohajer, which used scattered information from outside Tehran, placed the death toll at 12,000. In 1999, Abrahamian gathered testimonies from eyewitnesses and former prisoners. One anonymous former prisoner put the death toll in the "thousands". Another eyewitness estimated that between 5,000 and 6,000 people were killed—1,000 of them leftists and the rest MeK members. Still another placed it in the 'thousands', with as many as 1,500 killed at Gohardasht prison alone.

In February 2001, The Daily Telegraph reported on statistics and methods of the executions described by Hussein-Ali Montazeri, one of the key leaders of the 1979 Iranian Revolution and former Deputy Supreme Leader of Iran during Khomeini's tenure, in his memoirs, "The Memoirs of Grand Ayatollah Hossein Ali Montazeri". Montazeri stated that 3,800 political prisoners were executed during the first fortnight. The book describes Khomeini's fatwa ordering the executions, the committees deciding on executions, and physical methods of carrying out rapid executions on a massive scale. In the context of discussing Montazeri's memoirs, The Daily Telegraph states that "more than 30,000 political prisoners were executed in the 1988 massacre".

In 2008, Amnesty International reported between 4,500 and 5,000 deaths, including women. Ten years later, in 2018, they confirmed about 5,000 deaths. Human Rights Watch (HRW) puts the death toll between 2,800 and 5,000 people. According to Montazeri's autobiography, between 2,800 and 3,800 prisoners were killed, while the MeK claims a much higher number of 30,000 deaths. Ebadi notes that most victims were young students or recent graduates, with women making up more than 10% of those killed.

In 2019, Iranian politician and MeK leader Maryam Rajavi released the book Crime Against Humanity, which is about the 1988 executions. It shows where 36 mass graves are located in Iran and says that about 30,000 prisoners were killed, most of them MeK members.

In September 2017, a joint statement by three French non-governmental organizations (NGOs) (Note: Fondation Danielle-Mitterrand - France Libertés, Mouvement contre le racisme et pour l'amitié entre les peuples, and Women's Human Rights International Association (WHRIA).) to the United Nations Human Rights Council (UNHRC) reported death count estimates of above 32,000 from three different sources. Mohammad Maleki, former president of the University of Tehran and Iranian dissident, stated in a 14 August 2016 television interview with Dorr TV that a total of 32,400–33,400 executions, including 30,400 PMOI/MEK members and 2000–3000 "leftists". Mohammad Nourizad, an Iranian intellectual who was "a close associate" of Khamenei prior to the 2009 Iranian presidential election protests, stated in writing a total count of 33,000, according to the NGOs' UNHRC statement. The third source in the NGOs' statement was that former intelligence officer Reza Malek stated a total execution count of 33,700 based on "documents [that] he had personally seen".

== Response ==
=== International reaction and criticism ===
In 2008, human rights activist Kaveh Shahrooz expressed surprise that major groups like Amnesty International and Human Rights Watch had never fully investigated the executions. Amnesty International's 1990 report Iran: Violations of Human Rights 1987-1990 does briefly mentioned the executions in a few pages, stating:

The political executions took place in many prisons in all parts of Iran, often far from where the armed incursion took place. Most of the executions were of political prisoners, including an unknown number of prisoners of conscience, who had already served a number of years in prison. They could have played no part in the armed incursion, and they were in no position to take part in spying or terrorist activities. Many of the dead had been tried and sentenced to prison terms during the early 1980s, many for non-violent offences such as distributing newspapers and leaflets, taking part in demonstrations or collecting funds for prisoners' families. Many of the dead had been students in their teens or early twenties at the time of their arrest. The majority of those killed were supporters of the PMOI, but hundreds of members and supporters of other political groups, including various factions of the PFOI, the Tudeh Party, the KDPI, Rah-e Kargar and others, were also among the execution victims.

Similarly, HRW briefly discusses the executions in a report about President Mahmoud Ahmadinejad's chosen cabinet members. They called them "deliberate and systematic... extrajudicial killings", condemned them as crimes against humanity, and accused Pourmohammadi, who led Iran's Interior Ministry from 2005 to 2008, of direct involvement in the killings.

The United Nations Human Rights Council (UNHRC) brought attention to the executions on 30 August 2017, sharing a statement from three non-governmental organizations (NGOs) calling for truth, justice, and steps to prevent similar events. The UNHRC also received a joint statement from five UN-affiliated NGOs in February 2018. The statement asked the UN to "launch [a] fact-finding mission to investigate Iran's 1988 massacre in order to end impunity and prevent the same fate for detained protesters today".

On 4 December 2018, Amnesty International called on the government of Iran to reveal the fate of its political prisoners. They also urged the UN to create a team to investigate human rights crimes in Iran. In their report Blood-soaked secrets: Why Iran’s 1988 prison massacres are ongoing crimes against humanity, they claim that:

Thousands of political dissidents were systematically subjected to enforced disappearance in Iranian detention facilities across the country and extrajudicially executed pursuant to an order issued by the Supreme Leader of Iran and implemented across prisons in the country. Many of those killed during this time were subjected to torture and other cruel, inhuman and degrading treatment or punishment in the process.

Swedish authorities arrested Hamid Nouri, who was accused of helping carry out the executions as an assistant prosecutor, in November 2019. In an article for Radio Free Europe, UN Special Rapporteur Agnès Callamard is quoted as saying that this was the "first time that someone [was] charged in relation to the events that took place in 1988 in Iran". His trial began in August 2021, two months later than planned. He was charged with "torturing prisoners and subjecting them to inhumane conditions". The court gave him a life sentence in July 2022.

In July 2024, the UN Special Rapporteur on Human Rights in Iran published a report in which it categorised the executions as a genocide of Iranian political and religious minorities. Rapporteur Javaid Rehman determined that the executions, as well as the 1981–1982 massacres, had been carried out with the genocidal intent of removing the Islamic Republic's perceived enemies. Rehman called for Iranian officials to be held accountable for crimes against humanity. The Iranian government condemned the report as "false news" concocted by its adversaries to smear its reputation.

=== Montazeri ===
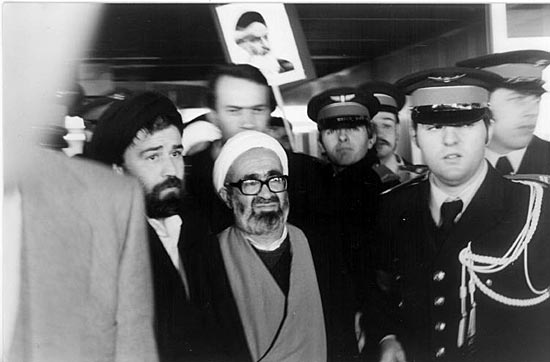
Deputy Supreme Leader Hussein Ali-Montazeri condemned the executions. He was dismissed by Khomeini and later placed under house arrest.

Because of the executions, Montazeri resigned from his position as next-in-line to replace Khomeini as Iran's Supreme Leader. Prior to the executions, Montazeri had clashed with Khomeini on several matters, including the trial of Mehdi Hashemi and the campaign against "hoarding". When Montazeri learned about the executions, he quickly sent three letters—two to Khomeini and one to the Special Commission—denouncing the executions "in no uncertain terms". Montazeri also wrote to Khomeini asking him to "at least order to spare women who have children" and warning that "the execution of several thousand prisoners in a few days will not reflect positively and will not be mistake-free".

Montazeri reported serious prisoner abuse, claiming that "a large number of prisoners have been killed under torture by interrogators" and that "in some prisons of the Islamic Republic young girls [were] being killed". He also claimed that "as a result of unruly torture, many prisoners [became] deaf or paralyzed or afflicted with chronic diseases". He criticized the Special Commission for "violating Islam by executing repenters and minor offenders who in a proper court of law would have received a mere reprimand". Khomeini asked Montazeri to resign, saying that he had always doubted Montazeri's competence and that he "expressed reservations when the Assembly of Experts first appointed [him]", but that the Assembly had pushed for Montazeri to be the next Supreme Leader anyway. The government released letters between the two leaders, but "the selection dealt only with the Hashemi affair and scrupulously avoided the mass executions—thus observing the official line that these executions never took place".

In August 2016, supporters of Montazeri posted an audio recording online from a meeting held on 15 August 1988. The recording showed Montazeri meeting with four members of the special judicial tribunal: Eshraqi, Raisi, Pourmohammadi, and judge Hossein-Ali Nayeri. In it, he called the tribunal members "judges of death", warning that that would be "remembered among the criminals of history" and condemning the mass executions, calling them "the biggest crime committed in the Islamic Republic since the beginning of the revolution" . The Ministry of Intelligence and Security (MOIS) had the recording taken down the day after its release. According to HRW, Montazeri's son Ahmed released the tape. As a result, he was charged with "spreading propaganda against the system" and "revealing plans, secrets or decisions regarding the state's domestic or foreign policies... in a manner amounting to espionage". He was later sentenced to 21 years in prison, but the sentence was ultimately suspended.

=== Victims' families ===
Despite attempts by Iranian authorities to conceal the killings, families of those killed—and other political activists—informed the national community.

==== Iran Tribunal ====
In 2012, the victims' families and survivors created the Iran Tribunal to investigate the executions. The Tribunal aims to hold the Iranian government accountable for human rights violations. Court hearings were held first in London and then at The Hague Peace Palace.

=== Iranian government's position ===
In August 2016, Pourmohammadi spoke about the executions at a government meeting in Khorramabad, Lorestan province. He said that "We are proud we have implemented God's order about Mojahedin" (PMOI or MeK). The following year, in 2017, Supreme Leader Ali Khamenei also defended the executions, stating that those killed were "terrorists" and "hypocrites". The Iranian government has accused people investigating the executions of "disclosing state secrets" and "threatening national security". According to Amnesty International, the Iranian government has engaged in an ongoing campaign to demonize victims; distort facts; and silence survivors, family members of victims, and human rights defenders. Public knowledge about the executions and widespread condemnation have "compelled the Islamic Republic to engage in a damage-containment propaganda exercise". Officials involved in the killings were subsequently given promotions.

=== Other criticisms ===
Abrahamian, in Tortured Confessions, criticized the executions by pointing out that most of the prisoners killed had only committed minor offenses, as those guilty of major crimes had already been put to death. He also compared the executions to the "disappearances" of prisoners in 20th-century Latin America. Robertson urged the UN Security Council to create a special court to judge those responsible, similar to courts set up for crimes in Yugoslavia and Rwanda. He also called the executions "one of the worst single human rights atrocities since the Second World War". Furthermore, according to human rights activist Manouchehr Ganji, the Islamic Revolutionary Courts were criticized by various human rights organizations for conducting "secret summary trials" that ignored basic human rights and proper legal procedures.

== Motivation ==
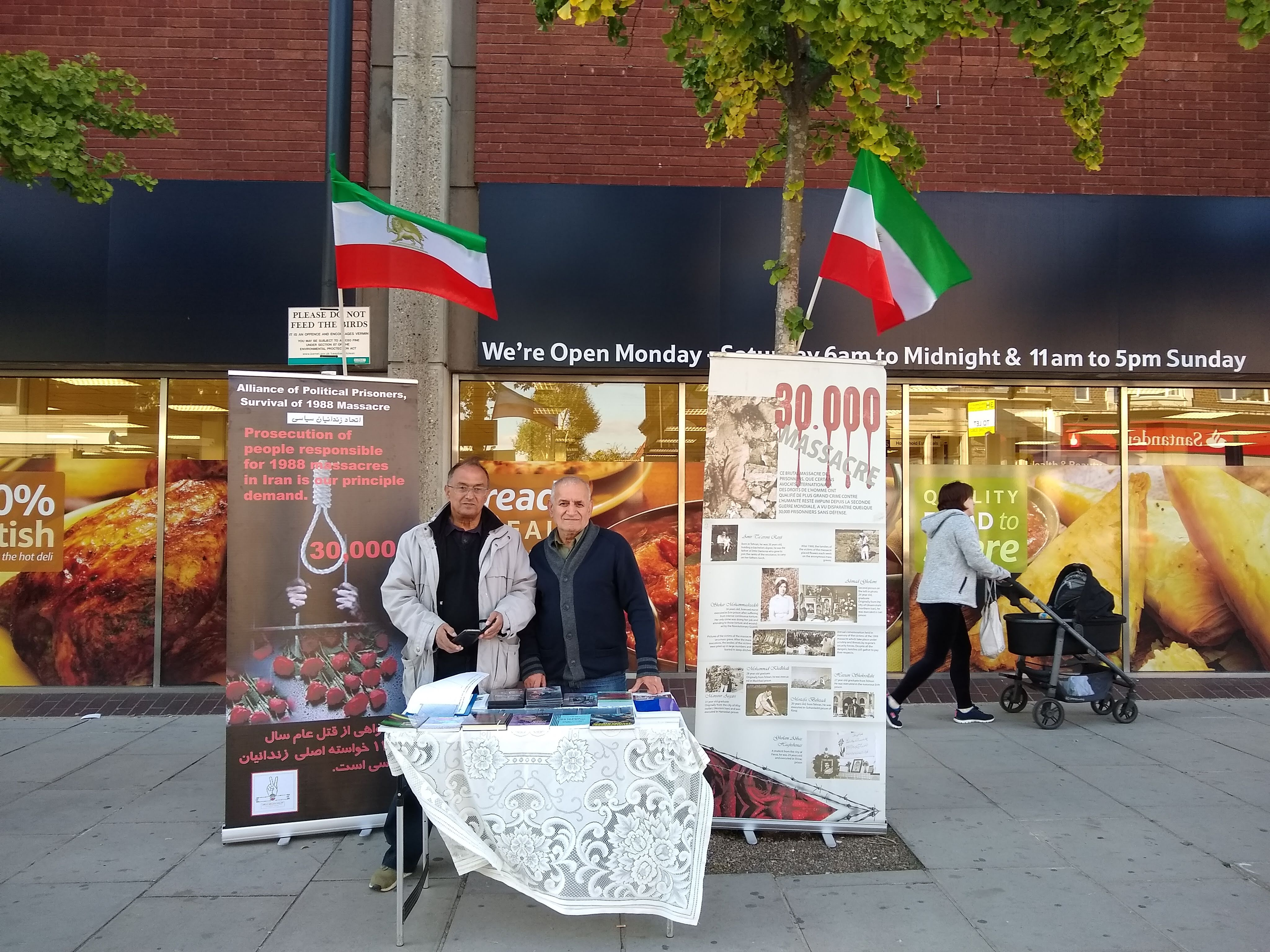
Campaigners for justice for the executed, London, 2018

Scholars debate why the prisoners were executed. Sociologist Ali Akbar Mahdi believes that prison overcrowding, combined with Operation Mersad, "had much to do" with the killings. Abrahamian attributes the executions to the "regime's internal dynamics". In his view, the executions acted as "a glue" to hold "together his disparate followers" and as a way to "purge" moderates like Montazeri and prevent any future "détente with the West" from destroying his legacy. He also claims that they prevented any future cooperation between Khomeinist populists and leftist groups and that Khomeini was concerned that "some of his followers had toyed with the dangerous notion of working with the Tudeh Party to incorporate more radical clauses into the Labor Law as well as into the Land Reform Law".

== See also ==
- Khavaran cemetery
- Mothers of Khavaran
- Freedom of speech in Iran
- History of the Islamic Republic of Iran
- Human rights in the Islamic Republic of Iran
- Chain murders of Iran
- StopExecutionsinIran
- Trial of Hamid Nouri
- Iranian Green Movement
- 2009 Iranian presidential election protests
- 2017–2018 Iranian protests
- 2021–2022 Iranian protests
- Mahsa Amini protests
- Political repression in the Islamic Republic of Iran
- Politics of Iran
