= StopExecutionsinIran =

Anti-Iranian government social media hastag

#اعدام_نکنید

"#StopExecutionsInIran" (Persian: اعدام نکنید#) is a hashtag originated on July 14, 2020, in response to the news of the order of executions for three young men by the names of Amir Hossein Moradi, Mohammad Rajabi, and Saeed Tamjidi; who were among the protesters in the 2019–2020 Iranian protests.

The hashtag (in its original Persian form of "اعدام_نکنید") was created after news of the confirmed execution order. It quickly went viral, trending at number one on Twitter for two hours. It also became the top trending hashtag in Germany, ranked second in Canada, and reached ninth place in the UK. Despite internet disruptions in Iran during the hashtag's rise, it still surpassed 8 million mentions by the early hours of July 15, 2020. It is also worth noting that since Twitter is blocked by the Ministry of Information and Communications Technology of Iran, almost all of the Twitter users from Iran need to use a VPN; thus the location of the tweets that are sent from Iran are disguised as the destination location of their chosen VPN service. The hashtag resurged in popularity after the death of wrestler Navid Afkari, who was believed to have been pressured to confess to murder.

== History ==
Amir Hossein Moradi, Mohammad Rajabi and Saeed Tamjidi were among protesters in Iran, who in November 2019, were protesting the regime's choices and chose the neighborhoods around the Sattar Khan Street in Tehran. According to HRANA, Amir Hossein Moradi was identified and arrested three days after the protests, by using CCTV footage of the protests; although his lawyer, Babak Paknia, has stated that his client was arrested due to a public struggle over a cellphone and after discovering footage regarding the protests on his phone, was handed over to the authorities. Mohammad Rajabi, Saeed Tamjidi and a third individual by the name of "Shima R." escaped to Turkey the day after Amir Hossein Majidi's arrest, and got arrested by the Turkish Police in Antalya. Even though they were introduced to UN representatives who they informed of the threats to their lives if they were returned to Iran, the Turkish government handed them over to Iranian authorities. The spokesperson for the Judicial system of Iran, Gholam-Hossein Esmaeli, claimed that two out of these three were arrested not for taking part in the 2019–2020 Iranian protests, but because they were involved in an armed robbery, and also claimed that some footage of them looting and destroying public buildings during the protests were found on their phones. It is imperative to mention that according to HRANA, people close to the accused have stated that there were confessions in regards to looting obtained from the accused while they were under torture during the investigation.

A court in February 2020 sentenced these men to an execution under the claim of "being an accomplice to destruction of public property in order to defy the Islamic Republic regime". In addition to execution, Amir Hossein Moradi had also been sentenced to 15 years of imprisonment and 74 lashings for an accusation of "armed robbery" and a year in prison for "attempting to flee the country". Saeed Tamjidi and Mohammad Rajabi both were sentenced to 10 years of imprisonment and 74 lashings due to their involvement in an "armed robbery" and a year in prison for "attempting to flee the country". HRANA claims that during the trial of Saeed Tamjidi and Mohammad Rajabi, their public defender did not properly defend them, and to make matters worse showed remorse for their actions and actively condemned them verbally throughout the trial. Shima Eskandari, another person involved in the case, has been sentenced to imprisonment, and the case for "Shima R." is still underway.

The spokesperson for the Judicial system of Iran has claimed that these men had sent the videos of their public looting to foreign media "to boast", and thus "have given the proper evidence for their condemnation by their own hands".

On July 14, 2020, news of the confirmation of their execution verdict was published, and it raised a wave of unrest in social media.

Emadeddin Baghi, on his personal Twitter account, stated that:

As someone who has been writing against the death penalty for 30 years and has been previously convicted by the Judicial system of Iran for this reason, while regretting the recent executions and being pleased with the suspension of another person's execution sentence in Arak, I am aware of 3 convicts of 2019–2020 Iranian protests and the Judicial System has been against it from the start. As the spokesperson said: Article 477 will change the result.

Babak Paknia, the attorney to Amir Hossein Moradi, has stated that:

In our opinion the punishment does not fit the crime. Because it is clearly stated in the transcripts that the accused, in court, have denied the previous statements taken from them under investigation. Based on that one of the judges have not approved the execution verdict and has ordered for more investigation; thus we asked for the continuation of investigation and a pardon.

On the matter of the three accused not having permission to use their own appointed lawyers, he has stated that:

The important thing to note is that neither my name or the two other appointed attorneys have not been mentioned in the lawsuit, yet the names of the public defenders are mentioned instead of us. It's important because the public defenders were excused by Mohammad Rajabi and Saeed Tamjidi. They have composed a letter to excuse these public defenders and appoint Hossein Taj and Mostafa Nili as their attorneys. Despite the fact that their request for these lawyers were denied, the original public defenders were still excused; yet the lawsuit from the Judicial System has been issued with their names on it.

Hossein Taj, attorney to Mohammad Rajabi, in a letter to the spokesperson of Judicial system of Iran has claimed that the accused were illegally denied their right to an attorney. He also criticized the spokesperson's declaration of the verdict before the official confirmation and their claim on the relations between the accused and foreign groups, even though the families of the accused have denied that time after time. He also mentions the accused's claim of unlawful methods to extract confessions out of them. He has also requested that the appointed attorneys receive rights to view the contents of their clients' case files.

== Bandwidth interruption ==
During the widespread social media campaign surrounding the "#StopExecutionsInIran" movement, aimed at notifying the masses and foreign press agencies, significant internet disruptions were reported across Iran. According to data provided by NetBlocks, a digital rights watchdog organization, connectivity issues began escalating on the evening of July 14, 2020. At approximately 9:00 p.m. local time, large portions of the country's internet bandwidth experienced either complete shutdowns or severe throttling, resulting in limited access and dramatically reduced internet speeds in several regions. These disruptions are widely believed to have been implemented at the directive of Iranian authorities through the country’s state-controlled internet service providers.

This pattern of interference aligns with the Iranian government's broader history of controlling and restricting digital communications during periods of political unrest. Notably, during the nationwide protests of November 2019, the government executed a total internet blackout lasting from 16-23, severing the country from global digital communication. Given this precedent, observers and digital rights groups expressed concern that a similar, more extensive shutdown could be imminent in response to the renewed online mobilization surrounding the hashtag campaign.

== Outcomes ==
=== Announcement (and the Consequential Denying) of Retrial and Stopping the Execution ===
On July 15, 2020, Fars News Agency ran a story that claimed Ebrahim Raisi, head of Judicial system of Iran, has issued a retrial based on the article 477 of criminal procedure. Though later Mahdi Keshtdar, CEO of Mizan Online News Agency (a subsidiary of Judicial system of Iran), stated that "the news that one of the other news agencies has published in regards to Ebrahim Raisi's order to retrial the three accused from 2019–2020 Iranian protests are false". Moments later, Fars News Agency also denied the story and ran an amendment that according to the criminal procedure, the chance for a retrial is on the shoulder of the attorneys.

=== Appointed Attorney's Right to Access their Clients' Case Files ===
Babak Paknia, attorney to Amir Hossein Moradi, has stated on July 15, 2020, that the appointed attorneys to the three accused have been given the right to view their clients' case files. He also mentioned that he would be issuing a request for article 477. He also stated that there were a lot of discrepancies in the procedure and in the files, and the appointed attorneys for the accused will try to stop the verdict. He also has mentioned that during the trial of the three accused, there were no lawyers present. According to criminal procedure, in cases that lead to life imprisonment or execution, there's a need for attorney in the early investigation and trials. He added that the only one of the accused that had an attorney present was Amir Hossein Moradi (which he himself represented), and even he wasn't given the necessary clearance to view the case files. He has stated that this fault alone is the necessary grounds for the request of a retrial on the execution verdict.

=== Unrest in Behbahan ===
On the eve of July 16, 2020, a protest gathering was formed in the city of Behbahan in Khuzestan province. According to social media account, the execution verdicts for the protesters of 2019–2020 Iranian protests and economical hardships brought by government's lack of proper management were the key points of this protest. According to NetBlocks, Khuzestan's bandwidth was strictly limited in the night of July 15, 2020. According to Deutsche Welle, the unrest also spread to Shiraz, Isfahan, Rasht, Mashhad, Tabriz and Urmia.

=== Temporarily stopping the verdict ===
On July 19, 2020, according to the attorneys to the accused their request for a retrial and opening the investigation once more, based on article 477 of criminal procedure, have been approved and the verdict has been stopped at the moment for the investigation and the retrial to conclude.

== Reactions ==
=== Iranian Government ===
On July 16, 2020, Iran International's website ran a story on the rise of a strict security atmosphere in Tehran and other cities of Iran. In the news story they claimed that "captured footage on social media and received by Iran International shows that on July 16, 2020, there were added security on standby in Valiasr Street and around Teatr-e Shahr Metro Station".

==== Threatening text messages ====
A notable sum of Twitter users claimed that they have received text messages from Judicial system of Iran, accusing them of "disrupting the national security" and demanding that they sign up on the official website of the Judicial System in order to process their lawsuits, or await the harshest of punishments. Though Mohammad Moased, Iranian Journalist, has said in a tweet that:

This text message who is claimed to be sent to users that support #StopExecutionsInIran is fake. Do not reply to it, do not register on any site and no one has the right and can not deprive you of your human right to express your opinion.

The Judicial system of Iran or any other government entity have not yet respond to the controversy of the text messages.

==== More arrests ====
According to Deutsche Welle, on July 17, 2020, there were more security measures and more riot police present all around the country, in cities such as Tehran, Tabriz, Rasht, Shiraz and many more; and there has also been reports of arresting people on the grounds of "causing unrest". In Mashhad, Imam Reza Army has stated that they have identified and apprehended a number of "key players of defiant groups" that were "in addition to working with anti-Islamic Republic foreign channels, were calling for people to gather in the streets and protest".

Also according to Iranian Students News Agency, quoting from Islamic Revolutionary Guard Corps in Fars province, a group of "misfits in cahoots with separatists that were trying to disrupt the province" have been arrested.

=== International support ===
There has been an abundance of support from local and international sources in defending the hashtag and asking for a retrial of the accused and stopping their executions; with many showing concerns that the idea of public execution and capital punishment in Iran needs revision and maybe a ban.

Many organisation, like Amnesty International and Writer's Guild of Iran, have issued statements and petitions to stop the execution at once, and Writer's Guild have called the recent executions and orders of executions in Iran "not a matter of justice, but a matter of politics".

==== United Nations ====
On July 16, 2020, Office of the United Nations High Commissioner for Human Rights issued a statement, in which they expressed their support of the hashtag and demanded that Ebrahim Raisi, the head of Judicial system of Iran, stop the executions of the three accused. In addition to stopping the executions, they demanded a third party investigation into the accusations against them. They also raised concerns about their claims of the use of torture to gather information from the accused; and asked for investigation into those claims, and trial or punishment for those responsible if the investigation proved the claims.

== See also ==
- 2019–2020 Iranian protests
- 2019 Internet blackout in Iran
