= Baháʼí Faith in Qatar =

Religious community

- البهائية في قطر
- Classification: Baháʼí
- Region: Qatar
- Language: Arabic, Persian, English
- Origin: 1940s Qatar
- Members: 200–300 (2022 estimate)

The Baháʼí Faith in Qatar is a small religious community that has been present in the country since the 1940s. The United States Commission on International Religious Freedom (USCIRF) has estimated the community at between 200 and 300 members, representing more than thirty nationalities and including a family of Qatari citizens. A separate National Spiritual Assembly of the Baháʼís of Qatar was established in 1978, following an earlier period during which the country fell under the jurisdiction of a regional Baháʼí administrative body covering the Arabian Peninsula.

The Baháʼí Faith is not among the religions legally recognised by Qatar. From the 1990s onwards, the community has been the subject of repeated reports by international bodies citing employment discrimination, denials and non-renewal of residency permits, the destruction of part of its cemetery in 2009, and the prosecution and deportation of community members. In 2025, the government deported Wahid Bahji, a member of the National Spiritual Assembly who had been born and raised in Qatar, and between 2021 and 2025 the chairman of the assembly, Remy Rowhani, was tried twice and ultimately acquitted on appeal. In 2026, the Baháʼí International Community said that more than 40% of Qatar's Baháʼís faced imminent expulsion as a result of administrative measures by the government.

== History ==
=== Early presence and community formation (1940s–1960s) ===
The Baháʼí community in Qatar has its roots in the 1940s, a period during which the country was a British protectorate prior to independence in 1971. Early adherents included families of Iranian origin who settled in the country in the 1940s and 1950s, some of whom subsequently acquired Qatari nationality. A Baháʼí cemetery in Qatar has been in continuous use since 1953.

In 1952, Shoghi Effendi, then head of the Baháʼí Faith, reported that the religion was being established in Qatar, and in 1953 consolidation of the Qatari community was included among the goals of the Baháʼí Ten Year Crusade assigned to the National Spiritual Assembly of the Baháʼís of Iraq. A Local Spiritual Assembly with jurisdiction over the whole country was reported in 1954, and by 1963 the same assembly was being designated the Local Spiritual Assembly of Doha. A second Local Spiritual Assembly and an additional Baháʼí group were reported in 1968.

=== National administration ===
A regional National Spiritual Assembly of the Arabian Peninsula, with jurisdiction over Qatar, was established in 1957. In 1962, the Sharia Court of Kuwait formally recognised a marriage ceremony conducted by the Local Spiritual Assembly of Qatar. The independent National Spiritual Assembly of the Baháʼís of Qatar was elected in 1978, the same period in which Baháʼí accounts described general restrictions on Baháʼí activity across the Arabian Peninsula. During the 1980s, the Qatari community took part in international Baháʼí activity, including support for institutions in Gabon, participation by Qatari Baháʼí youth in vocational programmes in Pakistan, and the delivery in January 1986 of the Universal House of Justice's message The Promise of World Peace to Qatar's head of state through the country's permanent mission to the United Nations.

== Demographics ==
USCIRF estimated the Qatari Baháʼí community at between 200 and 300 members in 2022, drawn from more than thirty nationalities and including a family of Qatari citizens. An earlier U.S. State Department report estimated about 100 Baháʼís of Iranian origin, "some of whom are nationals of the country", as of 2010. The Baháʼí International Community has stated that the majority of those targeted by the 2026 expulsion campaign belong to families known to have been Baháʼí for generations, in many cases predating Qatari independence in 1971.

The National Spiritual Assembly of the Baháʼís of Qatar oversees the application of Baháʼí practice in matters such as marriage, divorce and inheritance for members of the community. Human Rights Watch has reported that Qatari officials refused to accept marriage certificates issued by the elected Baháʼí institutions in the country.

== Restrictions and persecution ==
=== Legal status and recognition ===
Article 50 of the Constitution of Qatar provides that "freedom to practice religious rites shall be guaranteed to all persons in accordance with the law and the requirements of the maintenance of public order and morality". Qatari law requires religious groups to register with the Ministry of Foreign Affairs for legal recognition; the U.S. State Department has reported that registration requires a denomination to have at least 1,500 members in the country, and that Hindus, Buddhists and Baháʼís were not legally recognised but were permitted to worship privately in homes. The U.N. Office of the High Commissioner for Human Rights has stated that "throughout the decades since its independence, the Qatari Government has consistently refused to recognise the Baha'i community in Qatar or even to designate a governmental intermediary to liaise with the community on its basic and essential functioning." Writing for the Council on Foreign Relations in 2026, Elliott Abrams stated that the community "has been seeking legal recognition for 80 years and has never been granted it".

In the 1980s, a Baháʼí woman became one of Qatar's first female university graduates after earning a degree at the American University of Beirut; community families were by that period sending daughters to be educated both within Qatar and internationally. Throughout the 1990s, several Baháʼí women graduating from Qatar University were denied government employment on the basis of their faith; USCIRF has reported that further Baháʼís were subsequently denied employment in Qatar and left the country. Human Rights Watch reported that authorities had also terminated one community member's employment and refused to issue the certificate of good conduct required for employment in Qatar to four members of the group.

=== Cemetery ===
The Baháʼí cemetery established in 1953 was relocated in 1974 to the Thumama district of Doha after the original site fell within plans for a new road. In 2009, according to USCIRF and the U.N. OHCHR, the Doha municipality bulldozed and dug up graves at the cemetery; the work was ordered halted by the Emir of Qatar before its completion, and remains were reinterred at Thumama, though the identity of some was lost in the process. A new cemetery site was identified at Al-Rayyan in 2010 but construction did not proceed; a further site at Wadi Aba Salil in al-Wakrah municipality was identified in 2015. As of June 2022, the government had not granted permission for construction at the new site nor for permanent use of the existing site at Thumama.

=== Residency, deportations and blacklisting ===
USCIRF and U.N. Special Rapporteurs have reported that Qatari authorities have not renewed residency permits for Baháʼís sponsored under the country's kafala system, denied permits to spouses of Baháʼís living in the country, and placed Baháʼís on travel blacklists, in many cases without giving reasons. Because the kafala system ties expatriate residency to a specific employer, the non-renewal of a permit ordinarily compels departure from the country. In a 2019 joint communication to Qatar, U.N. Special Rapporteurs Fernand de Varennes and Ahmed Shaheed documented a "disturbing pattern of discrimination" against Baháʼís, including the administrative deportation and blacklisting of more than a dozen individuals between 2003 and 2018. Among the cases described in the 2019 communication were those of William Milne Lawson, a British resident of 35 years' standing whose departure was treated as a deportation "upon instructions from the security authorities" in 2015, and Farid Shafiei Sarvestani, an Iranian-born physician deported in 2005 who was still blacklisted a decade later, including from re-entering to attend a brother's funeral. Human Rights Watch later reported that it had documented the deportation of "as many as 14" members of the Baháʼí community between 2003 and 2025, "for no apparent reason other than individuals belonging to the Baha'i faith". The report also indicated that a high-ranking Qatari religious figure told one of the deported Baháʼís that if he announced his conversion to Sunni Islam, he could "make the deportation go away".

In January 2025, Qatari authorities issued a deportation order against 52–year–old Wahid Bahji, a member of the National Spiritual Assembly who had been born in Qatar to Iranian parents. The stated reason was "disrupting public order". He left Qatar on 22 March 2025 and was told he had been blacklisted from re-entry.

=== Prosecution of Remy Rowhani ===
In April 2021, a Qatari court tried Remy Rowhani, the chairman of the National Spiritual Assembly, in absentia under articles 4 and 42(5) of Law No. 15 of 2014 Regulating Charitable Activities, in connection with his role in administering Baháʼí community funds. He was sentenced in June 2021 to six months' imprisonment and a fine of 100,000 Qatari riyals (~$20,200 USD, equivalent to $27,500 in 2025); the sentence was reduced later that month to one month's imprisonment and a 50,000 riyal fine (~$10,100 USD, equivalent to $13,700 in 2025). Qatar's Court of Cassation upheld the conviction on 30 May 2022. Human Rights Watch reported that the law cited was applied retrospectively to conduct in 2013 and 2014 and that "financial donations are considered a religious obligation" for Baháʼís.

Rowhani was arrested on 23 December 2024 at Hamad International Airport in Doha to serve the earlier one-month sentence, having previously received assurances from immigration officials that he was free to travel. On 28 April 2025, he was re-arrested under the 2014 Cybercrime Prevention Law in connection with posts on social media accounts associated with the Qatari Baháʼí community. Human Rights Watch, which reviewed the posts, reported that they were limited to messages marking Qatari and Muslim holidays and to statements of Baháʼí principles such as the equality of women and men and service to humanity.

On 13 August 2025 a three-judge panel of Qatar's Supreme Judiciary Council convicted Rowhani and sentenced him to five years' imprisonment on charges under article 259 of the penal code, which criminalises the promotion of doctrines or ideologies that "cast doubt on the foundations and teachings of Islam", together with article 8 (Note: Article 8 dictates a punishment of three-year imprisonment, plus a fine of 500,000 QAR (~$101,002 USD, equivalent to $137,400 in 2025), to be imposed on any person who "manages through an Information Network or any information technology technique to have an unlawful access to a website or an information system belonging to a state authority, body or entity or any affiliated corporation.") of the 2014 Cybercrime Prevention Law and article 47(b) (Note: "[The following shall not be published] (b) Any material that could endanger the internal and external security of the State, including any propaganda to adopt any destructive principles.") of the 1979 Law on Publications and Publishing. A group of six U.N. Special Procedures mandate-holders, including Special Rapporteur on freedom of religion or belief Nazila Ghanea, had expressed "serious concern" about his detention on 31 July 2025. In September 2025, Baroness Helena Kennedy, director of the International Bar Association's Human Rights Institute, and nine other international jurists wrote an open letter calling for Rowhani's release and stating that his conviction violated multiple articles of the International Covenant on Civil and Political Rights. Qatar's Court of Appeal reversed Rowhani's conviction on 30 September 2025 and he was released on 4 October 2025.

=== 2026 expulsion campaign ===
On 30 April 2026, the Baháʼí International Community announced that more than 40% of Qatar's Baháʼí population faced impending deportation from the country through "unlawful detention, threats and intimidation, and notifications of non renewal of work permits". The Baháʼí International Community described the measures as "a deliberate campaign of religious erasure", noting that most of those targeted belonged to families known to have been Baháʼí for many generations preceding Qatari independence. Writing for the Council on Foreign Relations in May 2026, Elliott Abrams reported "a surge of refusals to renew residency permits and even curtailment of existing permits" between March and May 2026, and noted that USCIRF that year recommended for the first time that the U.S. government place Qatar on its "Special Watchlist" for religious freedom. In June 2026, Human Rights Watch reported that since March 2026 the authorities had ordered at least four people holding roles in the Baháʼí community's institutions to leave the country without due process or any means of appeal, with one held in detention for a week while awaiting deportation.

== International response ==
On 20 April 2022, the International Religious Freedom or Belief Alliance (IRFBA), a coalition of twelve governments including Australia, Brazil, Denmark, Estonia, Israel, Kosovo, Lithuania, the Netherlands, Norway, Slovakia, the United Kingdom and the United States, issued a joint statement expressing concern at the treatment of Baháʼís in Qatar and other countries. In June 2022, USCIRF published a country factsheet warning that the restrictions documented in Qatar could amount to "systematic restrictions on freedom of religion or belief" and reporting that social-media accounts linked to the Iranian government were encouraging the restrictions.

In a written answer to the House of Commons on 21 June 2022, Foreign, Commonwealth and Development Office minister Amanda Milling stated that British officials in Doha had raised the Baháʼí community's situation with the Qatari ministries of Interior and Foreign Affairs, and that the British Ambassador had raised the issue with Qatari ministers. U.N. Special Procedures mandate-holders issued public statements on the situation of the Qatari Baháʼís in 2019 and again in July 2025.

The Associated Press reported in 2025 that advocates and U.N. experts have linked the spread of anti-Baháʼí measures in countries including Qatar to influence from Iran, which has co-operated with Qatar in the joint exploitation of the South Pars/North Dome Gas-Condensate field. USCIRF separately reported that "social media accounts linked to Iran's government are actively encouraging these restrictions on Baha'is".

== See also ==
- Freedom of religion in Qatar
- Religion in Qatar
- Human rights in Qatar
- Persecution of Baháʼís
