= United Nations Special Rapporteur on Freedom of Religion or Belief =

United Nations Special Rapporteur

- Emblem of the United Nations
- Incumbent; Nazila Ghanea since August 2022
- Inaugural holder: Angelo d'Almeida Ribeiro
- Website: www.ohchr.org/en/issues/freedomreligion/pages/freedomreligionindex.aspx

The Special Rapporteur on Freedom of Religion or Belief was established in 1986 by the United Nations Commission on Human Rights.

== Background ==
The United Nations General Assembly passed the Declaration on the Elimination of All Forms of Intolerance and of Discrimination Based on Religion or Belief in 1981. Although not endowed with the force of international law, this resolution was the first international legal instrument devoted exclusively to the freedom of religion.

In furtherance of the goals of the 1981 resolution and in support the general evolution of the freedom of religion as a human right, the United Nations Commission on Human Rights established the "Special Rapporteur on Religion Intolerance." In 2000 the Commission on Human Rights changed the mandate title of the position to "Special Rapporteur on Freedom of Religion or Belief", in order that the position's name may more accurately capture the need for the Special Rapporteur to protect individuals' right to change religion or abstain from religious belief.

== Special Rapporteurs ==
The Special Rapporteur is appointed by the UN Human Rights Council. The mandate holder has been invited to identify existing and emerging obstacles to the free exercise of the right to freedom of religion or belief, and present recommendations on methods by which such obstacles may be overcome.

Past Independent Experts:

- Angelo d'Almeida Ribeiro (Portugal), March 1986 -1993
- Abdelfattah Amor (Tunisia), April 1993 - July 2004
- Asma Jahangir (Pakistan), August 2004 - July 2010
- Heiner Bielefeldt (Germany), 1 August 2010 – October 2016
- Ahmed Shaheed (Maldives), 1 November 2016 – July 2022

Current Independent Expert:

- Nazila Ghanea (Iran), 1 August 2022 – Present
