= Dhabihu'llah Mahrami =

Iranian activist

Dhabihu'llah Mahrami (1946 – 15 December 2005) (also Zabihullah Mahrami) was an Iranian Baháʼí who was charged with apostasy from Islam and jailed in Iran. After 10 years in prison he was found dead in his cell.

== Discrimination toward Baháʼís ==
Mahrami was an Iranian civil servant who lost his job after the government found that he was a Baháʼí. Adherents of the Baháʼí Faith are persecuted in the Islamic Republic and are denied employment. On August 16, 1995, Mr. Mahrami was called before the Islamic Revolutionary Court in Yazd, and was questioned about his adherence to the Baháʼí Faith. During the next few months the court met with Mr. Mahrami multiple times and tried to persuade him to renounce his beliefs. Upon his repeated refusal, Mr. Mahrami was charged with apostasy, and on January 2, 1996 was sentenced to death. His properties and assets were also confiscated.

Although Mahrami was a lifelong Baháʼí, the apostasy charge apparently came about because a sympathetic Muslim colleague, in an effort to prevent Mr. Mahrami from losing his job, stated that Mr. Mahrami had converted to Islam.

== Legal appeals ==
Mahrami's lawyer appealed to the Supreme Court of Iran; on January 28, 1997 the Supreme Court of Iran confirmed the death sentence and the news was conveyed orally to his relatives. In March 2000, following an international outcry, Mr. Mahrami's sentence was commuted to life in prison. Since that time until his death, Mr. Mahrami had been in a government prison in Yazd and was forced to perform arduous physical labour and had received death threats. After 10 years in prison he was found dead in his cell. The government informed his family that he had died of a heart attack, but Mr. Mahrami was reported to have been in good health shortly before his death.

After his death, organizations, including Amnesty International and the United States government, called on Iran to order a thorough investigation into his death and allow freedom of religion for all Iranians.
