= Rowshan Kuh =

Rowshan Kuh روشنكوه
- Village
- Location within Iran
- Coordinates: 36°22′50″N 53°21′58″E
- Country: Iran
- Province: Mazandaran
- County: Sari
- Bakhsh: Chahardangeh
- Rural District: Garmab

Population (2016)
  - Total: 25
- Time zone: UTC+3:30 (IRST)

Rowshan Kuh (Persian: روشنكوه, also Romanized as Rowshan Kūh or Roshankouh) is a village in Garmab Rural District, Chahardangeh District, Sari County, Mazandaran Province, Iran. At the 2016 census, its population was 25, in 11 families. Down from 34 people in 2006.

Rowshan Kuh has a substantial Baháʼí Faith population. Since 2016, authorities have bulldozed and confiscated Baháʼí land on several occasions, on spurious grounds that development is encroaching on protected lands. For example, on 2 August 2022, 18 Baháʼí homes were demolished, and over 20 hectares (49 acres) were confiscated. Amnesty International has characterized this campaign as part of a widespread persecution of Baháʼís by the Iranian government, noting that at least 18 Baháʼí farmers have lost their livelihoods as of August 2022.
