= Nazila Ghanea =

Iranian British lawyer at Oxford Uni

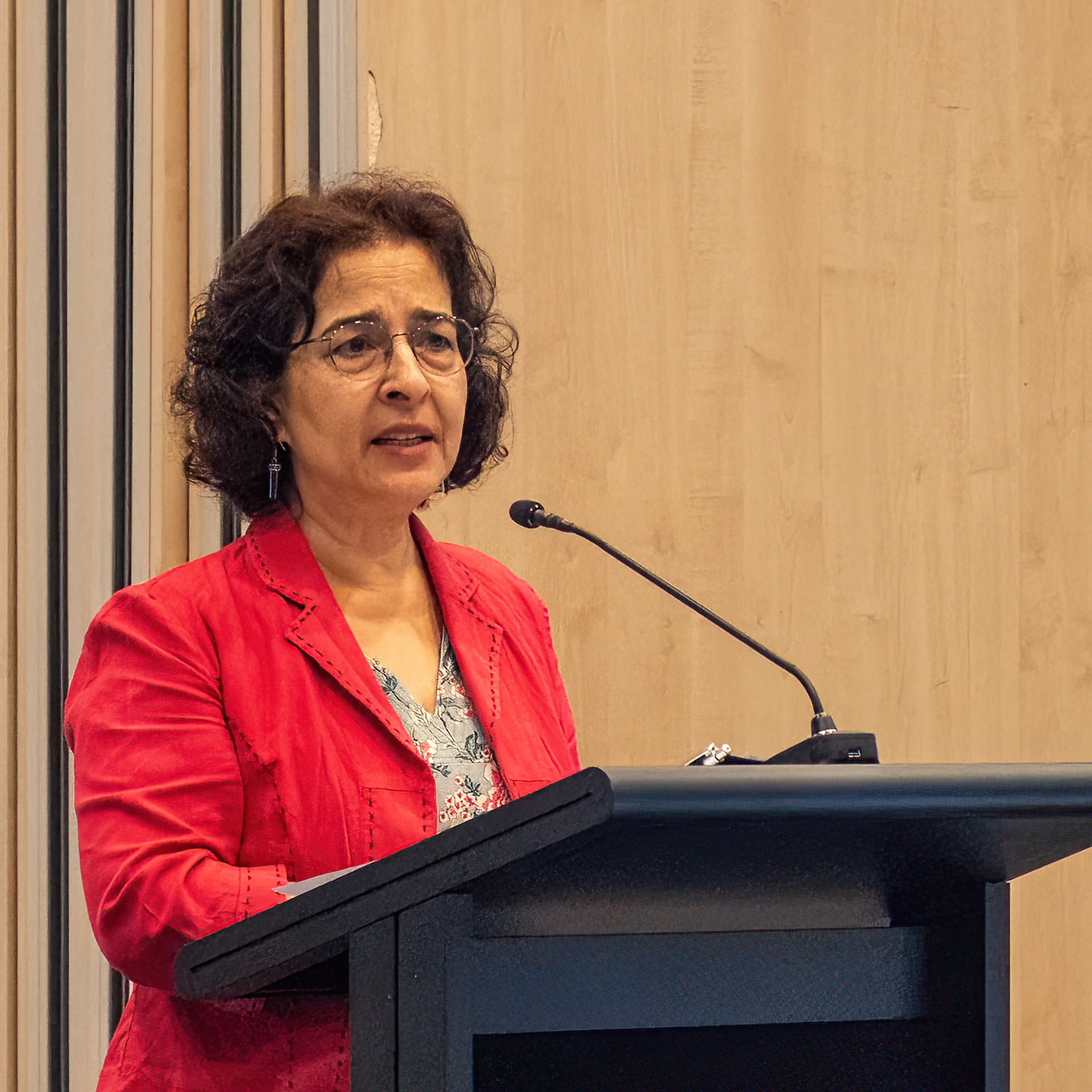
- Ghanea at the World Humanist Congress in 2023
- Born: 1968 (age 57–58); Shiraz
- Education: Keele University, Leeds University and Oxford University
- Occupation: Professor of law
- Employer: University of Oxford
- Known for: United Nations Special Rapporteur on Freedom of Religion or Belief
- Predecessor: Ahmed Shaheed (as rapporteur)
- Successor: incumbent (2024)

Nazila Ghanea (born August 1968) is an Iranian-born British lawyer. She is a professor of law at Oxford University and the United Nations Special Rapporteur on Freedom of Religion or Belief.

== Life ==
Ghanea was born in Shiraz in August 1968. She left Iran in about 1979. She took her first degree at Keele University and she has master's degrees from Leeds University and Oxford University. She returned to her alma mater to gain her doctorate.

In 2000 she was employed at the University of London. In 2006 she left London to be the Professor of International Human Rights Law at the University of Oxford and to lead their Master's course on International human rights law. She has spent three decades in academia including a year teaching in China.

In 2018 she and her co-authors, Heiner Bielefeldt and Michael Wiener, were given the inaugural (Senior) Alberigo Award for their 2016 work,Freedom of Religion or Belief: An International Law Commentary.

She became the Special Rapporteur on freedom of religion or belief on 1 August 2022 when she succeeded Professor Ahmed Shaheed of the University of Essex. She had been proposed for the role by the state of Oman and several NGOs. She was chosen finally after short listing and interviews. It is an unpaid position to support the commitment of 173 countries to article 18 which states "Everyone shall have the right to freedom of thought, conscience and religion. This right shall include freedom to have or to adopt a religion or belief of his choice, and freedom, either individually or in community with others and in public or private, to manifest his religion or belief in worship, observance, practice and teaching."

Ghanea was the first Iranian to hold the UN position although she said in a 2022 interview that she had not returned to Iran since she left as a child. She also said that she had been surprised that year by tensions in Leicester which some saw as Muslims versus Hindus, while others saw this as a simplification. Ghanea had not been asked to get involved professionally but she was concerned at what had influenced a city to unrest – which she had seen as a beacon of religious tolerance.

Ghanea has been a member of the panel organised by the Office for Democratic Institutions and Human Rights to assist OSCE nations with achieving religious freedoms.

In 2024 she addressed the United Nations General Assembly as their Special Rapporteur on freedom of religion or belief with her report, "Hatred on the basis of religion or belief". In October she visited Hungary where "church-state relations now uncomfortably resemble those during the Communist era".

According to an interview published in Brussels Morning, Ghanea stated that “The influence of religion and family beliefs likely shaped my choice in this field. I advocate fervently for universal freedom of religion and belief, emphasizing the importance of respecting others’ humanity and conscience.”

== Publications include ==
- The Challenge of Religious Discrimination at the Dawn of the New Millennium, 2003, edited by
- Human Rights, the UN and the Bahá’ís in Iran, 2003
- Does God believe in Human Rights, 2007
- Freedom of Religion or Belief: An International Law Commentary, 2016 (with Heiner Bielefeldt and Michael Wiener)
- Women and Religious Freedom: Synergies and Opportunities, 2017
- Hatred on the basis of religion or belief: Report of the Special Rapporteur on freedom of religion or belief, 2024
