= Persecution of Baháʼís =

The persecution of Baháʼís has occurred in several countries, particularly in parts of the Middle East, where followers of the Baháʼí Faith have faced state-sponsored discrimination, restrictions on religious practice, arbitrary detention, expulsion, and denial of civil rights. The persecution has been most extensive and sustained in Iran, where Baháʼís constitute the country’s largest non-Muslim religious minority. Religious and political authorities have frequently portrayed the Baháʼí Faith as heretical or as a form of apostasy from Islam, while governments have also accused Baháʼís, without substantiated evidence, of disloyalty, foreign influence, or espionage. Significant government repression has also been documented in Egypt, Qatar, and Yemen.

The Baháʼí Faith originated in 19th-century Persia with the ministries of the Báb and Bahá’u’lláh. The Báb proclaimed that his mission was to prepare humanity for the appearance of a divinely appointed figure, while Bahá’u’lláh later claimed to be that figure and founded the Baháʼí Faith. Baháʼí teachings emphasize principles including the unity of humanity, the equality of women and men, the harmony of science and religion, the elimination of prejudice, and the independent investigation of truth.

The rapid growth of the Bábí movement was regarded as a political and religious threat by the Qajar authorities and the Shia clergy. Thousands of Bábís were killed during violent campaigns against the movement, and the Báb was publicly executed in 1850. After Bahá’u’lláh announced his religious claims and the Baháʼí Faith began to spread, his followers continued to face pressure to renounce their beliefs and return to Islam. The persecution continued after Bahá’u’lláh was exiled from Iran and has persisted in the country into the present day. Bahá’u’lláh, members of his family, and a number of his followers were also subjected by the Ottoman authorities to successive exiles, imprisonment, confinement, and restrictions on their activities.

In Iran, persecution has continued under three successive political systems. During the Qajar dynasty, the state and the Shia clergy participated in violent campaigns against the Bábí movement; thousands were killed and the Báb was publicly executed in 1850. Under the Pahlavi dynasty, Baháʼís experienced changing levels of toleration, but their schools and institutions were closed and their literature was censored. In 1955, the government supported a clerically led anti-Baháʼí campaign in which national radio and official media disseminated propaganda, military forces occupied and damaged Baháʼí centres, Baháʼís were dismissed from employment, and mob attacks spread across the country.

Since the Iranian Revolution of 1979, persecution has become an official and systematic policy of the Islamic Republic. A central expression of this policy was a secret memorandum concerning the “Baháʼí question”, issued on 25 February 1991 by the Supreme Council of the Cultural Revolution at the request of Supreme Leader Ali Khamenei. The memorandum directed that the government’s dealings with Baháʼís should be conducted so that “their progress and development are blocked”. It also called for Baháʼís to be expelled from universities once their religious identity became known, for those who identified themselves as Baháʼís to be denied employment, for Baháʼís to be excluded from positions of influence, and for a plan to be devised to “confront and destroy their cultural roots” outside Iran. Human Rights Watch described the memorandum as a foundational policy document for the systematic and widespread abuses committed against Baháʼís and noted that it has repeatedly been cited in subsequent government and judicial correspondence.

A 2024 report prepared by the Abdorrahman Boroumand Center for Human Rights in Iran, in partnership with Eleos Justice at Monash University, stated that “the ideology underpinning the persecution of Baháʼís in Iran is multifaceted, drawing on religious, political, and historical narratives. It combines theological objections with conspiracy theories [and] nationalist sentiments … [and has been] encoded in law and institutionalized in various forms of discrimination and persecution.”

Iranian authorities have executed or forcibly disappeared hundreds of Baháʼís and have arrested, detained, prosecuted, or imprisoned thousands. Early post-revolution campaigns concentrated on elected and appointed members of Baháʼí institutions; from the presidency of Mahmoud Ahmadinejad onward, repeated nationwide waves of arbitrary arrests have increasingly targeted ordinary community members, including women and people engaged in peaceful educational or social-service activities. Women were disproportionately affected during the intensified campaign following the 2022 Woman, Life, Freedom movement. Courts have relied on broadly worded accusations such as “propaganda against the state”, “acting against national security”, membership in an “illegal” organization, and educational or religious activity said to be contrary to Islam, while Baháʼí institutions and many forms of peaceful community activity remain prohibited.

Over several decades, Baháʼí detainees have been subjected to torture and other ill-treatment, including beatings, electric shocks, mock executions, prolonged solitary confinement, denial of food or medical care, threats against family members, and coerced confessions. These abuses have continued in recent years and were again reported during the intensified repression of 2026, when some detainees faced accusations carrying the death penalty.

Economic pressure has been a central component of the persecution. Authorities have denied Baháʼís equal access to higher education, public employment, pensions, and professional and business licences, and have pressured private employers to dismiss Baháʼí workers. They have forcibly closed hundreds of Baháʼí-owned businesses, imposed excessive bail requirements—often secured against family homes, farmland, or other property—and confiscated or demolished homes, shops, agricultural land, vehicles, bank accounts, and communal assets. In rural communities across Iran, Baháʼí residents have been displaced and their homes and farmland confiscated or demolished, including in Ivel, Roshankouh, Ahmadabad, and other villages. Similar business closures and seizures of homes, commercial property, vehicles, bank accounts, and other assets have occurred in cities and provinces including Mazandaran, Semnan, and Isfahan.

Authorities have also refused to recognize Baháʼí marriages and other civil-status rights, demolished or desecrated holy places and cemeteries, and interfered with burials. State officials, clerics, educational institutions, and state-affiliated media have conducted systematic campaigns of anti-Baháʼí hate propaganda and incitement, portraying Baháʼís as heretics, foreign agents, spies, or enemies of the state. During periods of political unrest, war, or other national crises, Baháʼís have repeatedly been scapegoated and blamed for Iran’s political and economic problems. In 2024, Human Rights Watch concluded that the cumulative effect of Iran’s decades-long, widespread, and systematic state policy amounted to the crime against humanity of persecution.

In Egypt, the Baháʼí Faith was legally recognized as an independent religion in 1925, but President Gamal Abdel Nasser’s government dissolved Baháʼí institutions and prohibited organized Baháʼí activities in 1960. The religion remains officially unrecognized, limiting the community’s ability to administer marriages, personal-status matters, religious institutions, and burial grounds. For years, Baháʼís were also unable to obtain identity documents unless they falsely registered as Muslim, Christian, or Jewish, preventing access to education, employment, medical care, travel, and other basic services. A 2009 reform allowed identity documents to contain a dash instead of a recognized religion, but it did not grant legal recognition to the Baháʼí Faith, and discrimination concerning marriage, education, and burial rights has continued.

In Qatar, authorities have been accused of pursuing a long-standing policy of religious discrimination through arbitrary detention, blacklisting, deportation, refusal to renew residency permits, employment restrictions, and non-recognition of Baháʼí marriage documents. These measures have caused loss of employment, permanent exclusion from the country, and the separation of families, while restrictions on cemeteries and community institutions have impeded collective religious life.

In Yemen, persecution became systematic after the Houthi movement took control of Sanaa in 2014. Houthi authorities have carried out mass arrests, prolonged and arbitrary detention, enforced disappearances, raids on Baháʼí gatherings, confiscation of property, forced exile, and prosecutions on espionage and apostasy-related charges. Baháʼís have received death sentences, Baháʼí institutions have been ordered dissolved, and public speeches by Houthi leaders have incited hostility against the community.

== Iran ==
=== Qajar dynasty ===
The Báb declared his mission in Persia in 1844 during the Qajar Dynasty (1789–1925). From 1844 - 1853, opposition to the Bábis was led by the Shi’a clergy who were driven by a belief that the religion was a challenge to and an infringement of Islam, and who feared for their livelihoods and standing. When in 1848 the clergy procured support from the state, the Bábis responded by defending themselves in situations where they were assured of sufficiently large numbers, and enduring the suffering when they didn’t.

To begin with the mullas tried to stop the spread of the Bábi religion by condemning the believers as enemies of God and apostates, resulting in torture, public executions and mass attacks. Efforts by the Bábis to defend themselves resulted in the engagement of troops by the government, with heavy casualties on both sides. The Báb’s imprisonment from 1846 until 1850 resulted in a public execution, and when in 1852 there was a failed attempt from two Bábís to kill the Shah in revenge, the result was a large scale massacre of over 20,000 Bábís, including 400 Shí'i mullas who had become followers of the Báb.

The writings of Baháʼu’lláh challenged various deep-rooted doctrines of Shí'i Islam, including the equality of women and men, the formation of a world federal government, the inclusion of Western sciences in the school curriculum, and the independent investigation of truth. He also stated that there is no longer a need for a priesthood, thus calling into question the existence of the Shí'i ecclesiastical structure with its extensive financial network sustained by fees, ecclesiastic offices and endowments. In cities and villages where the clergy were strongly influencial, the mullas used their power in order to provoke attacks on the Baháʼís, a situation which lasted until the Qájár dynasty was overthrown in 1925.

Between 1853 - 1921 persecutions tended to be local, initiated by governors or clerics more for personal gain in regard to prestige or wealth than for religious purposes, since with no protection from any European powers the Baháʼís were in a vulnerable position. By following Baháʼu'lláh’s instructions to desist from defending themselves, the Baháʼís demonstrated their peaceful intentions and their obedience to the government. From circa 1882 not only did the central government cease the persecution of Baháʼís, but looked upon any harassment initiated by local clerics with disapproval. During the 1920s attacks on the Baháʼí community were being instigated by the state.

During the first decades of the twentieth century centrally-directed campaigns targeting the entire Baháʼí community generally and its institutions particularly were initiated, in addition to the repression which had been impacting individual Baháʼís since the nineteenth century. Starting in the twentieth century, in addition to repression that impacted individual Baháʼís, centrally-directed campaigns that targeted the entire Baháʼí community and institutions were initiated. Some of these persecutions were recorded by missionaries who were in the areas at the time of the massacres, and in one incident in 1903 more than 100 Baháʼís were killed in Yazd .

=== Pahlavi dynasty ===
During the Pahlavi Dynasty [1925 to 1979] the Baháʼís were considered by some scholars as being "a political pawn". Initially toleration of Baháʼís by the Government was consonant with secular Western concepts of freedom of worship, and considered as being a way in which to demonstrate to the mullahs exactly who had authority. However, since the Baháʼís were in a minority with most Iranians following traditional beliefs of Apostasy in Islam, when the government was politically weak and in need of clerical support, the withdrawal of government protection in order to permit persecution of the Baháʼís was viewed as being an acceptable concession to the mullahs.

From around 1934, by using the excuse that the Baháʼí Faith wasn’t a religion, Baháʼí administrative establishments and holy places were attacked. Baháʼí schools, such as the Tarbiyat boys' and girl's schools in Tehran, were closed, Baháʼí marriages were not recognized, attacks were made in the Iranian press, access was denied to government jobs, and Baháʼí literature was censored.

During the reign of Muhammad Ridá Sháh, from 1941—79, with the fear of communism being used as justification, the clerics felt empowered to take action against the Baháʼís, including false accusations of lawbreaking. Whereas previously the Baháʼís had submitted themselves to persecution, they now endeavoured to persuade the police and courts to take responsibility and protect them, reaching out to international bodies when that failed. Although the Baháʼís had been protected during the heyday of the secular ruler, Reza Shah, when in 1955, two years after the 1953 Iranian coup d'état, Reza Shah's son, Mohammad Reza Shah required clerical support for the Baghdad Pact, Baháʼís were no longer protected from attacks.

Due to growing nationalism and economic problems, Mohammad Reza Pahlavi relinquished certain religious affairs to the clergy of the country, the resulting power sharing resulting in a campaign of persecution against the Baháʼís. Akhavi has suggested the likelihood that by orchestrating a movement against the Baháʼís the government had hoped that it could serve to obscure the fact that revenues obtained by the distribution of oil from western oil companies was going to be too low for the growing nationalistic sentiment; it would also serve to gain the support of the clergy for their foreign policy. They approved and coordinated the anti-Baháʼí campaign to incite public antagonism against the Baháʼís which began in 1955, and included the spreading of anti-Baháʼí propaganda in national radio stations and official newspapers.

During the month of Ramadan in 1955, populist preacher Sheikh Mohammad Taqi Falsafi, began a high profile campaign against the Baháʼís. Having received permission from the Shah to express anti-Baháʼí rhetoric in his sermons, he encouraged other clergy to do the same, causing mob violence against the Baháʼís. Clergy were given permission to use national radio in order to encourage Musiims to wage holy war against Baháʼís, leading to swathes of violence against Baháʼís throughout Iran and all Baháʼi activities being suppressed by order of the government.As a result Baháʼí properties were destroyed, Baháʼí centres were looted, Baháʼí cemeteries desecrated, and Baháʼís were killed, some hacked to pieces; Baháʼí women were abducted and forced to marry Muslims, and Baháʼís were expelled and dismissed from schools and employment. During the third week of the sermons the National Baháʼí Centre in Tehran was occupied by the military and its dome later destroyed. The Minister of the Interior, Amir Asadollah Alam, wrote in his memoirs:

Falsafi managed to fool both the Shah and the military authorities and start a campaign against the Baháʼís that dragged the country to the edge of disaster. It was Ramadan. [Falsafi's] noon sermons were broadcast throughout the nation via radio and caused violence and terror in many locations. People killed a few Baháʼís here and there. Falsafi justified these acts by saying that they increased the Shah's prestige. I had no choice but to order him, in my own rash way, to refrain from giving further speeches until order was reestablished.

Despite an attempt by the government to put a stop to the inflammatory sermons, Falsafi carried on until the end of Ramadan. Throughout the 1950s the clergy continued initiating their repression of the Baháʼí community, their efforts checked by government ministers who, despite being sympathetic to the anti-Baháʼí sentiment, feared that the violence would rapidly escalate and cause international criticism.

The 1950s also saw the foundation of the fundamentalist Islamic organization, Hojjatiyeh, its central aim being to combat the Baháʼí Faith. Members of the group entered Baháʼí communities, with Baháʼí arrests, imprisonments and executions often being attributed to members of Hojjatiyeh having access to Baháʼí registration books. Hojjatiyeh was also believed to have cooperated with SAVAK, the Iranian government's intelligence agency which gathered information concerning the religious affiliation of Iranian citizens with the aim of attacking the Baháʼís.

Eliz Sanasarian states that while many Iranians blamed the Baháʼí persecution on Hojjatiyeh, which was the most visible anti-Baháʼí force, the silent Iranian majority couldn't "avoid personal and communal responsibility for the persecutions of the Baháʼí in this extreme manner. To provide tacit support, to remain silent, ... do not excuse the majority for the actions based on prejudice and hate against an Iranian religious minority group."

In the late 1970s the Shah's regime consistently lost legitimacy due to criticism that the Shah was pro-Western, and as the anti-Shah movement gained ground and support, revolutionary propaganda circulated stating that some of the Shah's advisors were Baháʼís. Baháʼís were portrayed as being an economic threat and supporters of Israel and the West, and the prevalence of hatred of the Baháʼís increased.

In the final months of 1978, anti-Baháʼí violence included widespread arson and destruction of property. Reports documented damage to or destruction of 22 Baháʼí cemeteries and hundreds of Baháʼí homes and businesses. In December 1978, several hundred Baháʼí homes were burned in Sarvestan, displacing more than 1,000 residents.

When the Islamic revolution in 1979 enabled the clerical class to gain political power they used their new found autonomy to attack and persecute the Baháʼí community freely through every means they could think of in an attempt to bring them down.

=== Revolution and early Islamic Republic ===
Following the Iranian Revolution, Baháʼí institutions and community leaders were systematically targeted. In 1979, Hojjatiyeh members occupied the National Baháʼí Centre in Tehran and centres in other cities, expelled their staff, and seized membership lists and personnel records. The seized records were subsequently used to send threatening notices warning Baháʼís of the consequences of continuing to profess their faith. Before returning to Iran, Ruhollah Khomeini was asked by Professor James Cockroft whether Baháʼís would enjoy religious or political freedom under an Islamic government. He replied:

“They are a political faction; they are harmful. They will not be accepted.” When Cockroft specifically asked whether they would have freedom of religious practice, Khomeini answered, “No.”

— Interview with Ruhollah Khomeini, 1979

The main strategy of the newly formed government of the Islamic Republic was the oppression and elimination of dissidents, justified as being for the protection of the foundation of Islam and the Revolution. From June 1981 until March 1982 the ruling clerics operated a programme of mass executions including political opponents and members of the Baháʼí Faith.

On 29 August 1983, the government prohibited all formal Baháʼí administrative and community activities, forcing the dissolution of the third National Spiritual Assembly and approximately 400 Local Spiritual Assemblies. Although the Baháʼí community complied, former assembly members continued to be arrested and several members of the third National Spiritual Assembly were executed.

=== Legal and institutional framework ===
The 1906 Iranian constitution omitted provisions expressly guaranteeing freedom of worship, while later legislation recognized Zoroastrian, Jewish, and Christian communities but not Baháʼís. The constitution of the Islamic Republic likewise recognizes Zoroastrians, Jews, and Christians as protected religious minorities but excludes the Baháʼí Faith. Government representatives have repeatedly characterized the Baháʼí community as a political organization, a security threat, or a movement linked to foreign powers rather than as an independent religion.

Accounts of the constitutional drafting proceedings have described the exclusion as deliberate; Eliz Sanasarian wrote that the wording of the relevant provisions was closely negotiated to ensure that Baháʼís remained outside the constitution’s protections. Responding to international criticism, Iranian officials described Baháʼís as a “misguided group ... whose affiliation and association with world Zionism is a clear fact” and stated that “Baháʼísm is not a religion, but a political doctrine.”

Courts and security agencies have used broadly worded national-security and propaganda offences to prosecute Baháʼís for peaceful religious and community activity. Because Iranian law treats those who acknowledge Muhammad as Muslims while Baháʼís also recognize the Báb and Baháʼu'lláh as later messengers, Baháʼís have often been portrayed as apostates or heretics rather than adherents of a separate religion.

==== 1991 secret memorandum ====
In February 1991, the Supreme Council of the Cultural Revolution issued a confidential memorandum on the “Baháʼí question”, approved by Supreme Leader Ali Khamenei. It instructed state agencies to conduct their dealings with Baháʼís in such a manner that “their progress and development are blocked”, to expel Baháʼí students from universities once their religious identity became known, to deny employment to those who identified themselves as Baháʼís, and to exclude Baháʼís from positions of influence. The memorandum also called for a plan to “confront and destroy their cultural roots” outside Iran. The document was made public in a 1993 United Nations report, the Human Rights Watch reporting in 2024 that it remained in force and continued to be cited in judicial and administrative decisions.

=== Continuing persecution ===
After the large-scale executions of the early revolutionary period declined, persecution continued through legislation, administrative policies, security measures, and judicial proceedings affecting nearly every aspect of Baháʼí life. Iranian authorities have maintained that Baháʼís are prosecuted for security offences rather than their faith; however, in court judgments and official correspondence examined by Human Rights Watch, membership in the Baháʼí Faith, prayer meetings, religious education and the administration of marriages and burials, were found to be used as evidence of membership in an illegal organization, “propaganda against the state”, or action against national security.

Bani Dugal, the Baháʼí International Community’s principal representative to the United Nations, argued that the offer of release in exchange for conversion demonstrated the religious basis of the prosecutions, stating that “time and again, Baha'is have been offered their freedom if they recant their Baha'i beliefs and convert to Islam”.

Attacks increased during the presidency of Mahmoud Ahmadinejad. Throughout the 2010s and 2020s, authorities continued to raid Baháʼí homes, confiscate books and electronic equipment, summon adherents for interrogation, and prosecute them for peaceful religious activity. Human Rights Watch cited a 2011 judgment from a court in Amol in which organizing prayer meetings and teaching Baháʼí beliefs were treated as evidence of propaganda against the state. In February 2021, articles 499 bis and 500 bis were added to the Islamic Penal Code; Human Rights Watch stated that their vague provisions concerning religious “cults” and teachings considered contrary to Islam gave authorities another means of prosecuting Baháʼís for expressing or teaching their beliefs.

A renewed nationwide campaign began in July and August 2022. Intelligence agents raided dozens of Baháʼí homes, confiscated property, detained at least 30 people, and subjected others to interrogation, electronic monitoring, or threats of imprisonment. Authorities also demolished Baháʼí homes and seized agricultural land.

In December 2024, independent United Nations experts expressed concern in regard to what they described as an increase in the systematic targeting of Baháʼí women through arrests, summonses, enforced disappearances, home raids, confiscation of belongings, restrictions on movement, and prolonged or repeated imprisonment. In July 2026, the Associated Press reported a further escalation amid nationwide protests and armed conflict involving Iran, Israel, and the United States. Human rights groups reported that dozens of Baháʼís had been imprisoned since January and that Baháʼí books and religious symbols had been desecrated during raids. The Baháʼí International Community reported that at least 63 Baháʼís were imprisoned as of 11 June.

==== Arrests, imprisonment, and surveillance ====
Since the 1979 revolution, Iranian authorities have arrested, detained, prosecuted, or imprisoned thousands of Baháʼís, initially concentrating on elected and appointed members of Baháʼí institutions and later expanding nationwide to the community members. From the presidency of Mahmoud Ahmadinejad onwards, repeated waves of arbitrary arrests have affected Baháʼís across Iran, relying on vaguely defined accusations such as “propaganda against the state”, “acting against national security”, membership in an “illegal” group, or educational and religious activity said to be contrary to Islam. Campaigns involving arrests have frequently intensified during periods of political unrest or national crisis, when state media and security institutions have scapegoated Baháʼís, women and those engaged in peaceful education or social-service activities being particularly exposed.

===== Early post-revolution arrests and imprisonment =====
During the first years of the Islamic Republic, the arrest campaign focused heavily on people serving the Baháʼí community at national and local levels. Members of successive National Spiritual Assemblies and numerous Local Spiritual Assemblies were arrested, imprisoned, forcibly disappeared, or executed, while many other Baháʼís were detained for long periods due to their religious affiliation or participation in community affairs. Human Rights Watch reported that thousands of Baháʼís were arrested or otherwise penalized after the revolution, and that influential community members and people serving on Baháʼí institutions were especially targeted.

The arrests continued after the government formally prohibited Baháʼí administrative and community activities in August 1983. An Amnesty International report archived by the Abdorrahman Boroumand Center stated that 390 Baháʼís were arrested following the prohibition, bringing the number of imprisoned Baháʼís in Iran to more than 700. Many were held for years, and the arrests helped dismantle the elected institutions through which Baháʼís had administered marriages, burials, education, charitable assistance, and other community affairs.

===== Nationwide arbitrary arrests since 2005 =====
Arrests increased again after Ahmadinejad became president in 2005 and have continued under subsequent administrations. Arrests have generally involved coordinated home raids, seizure of computers, telephones, religious books and personal documents, lengthy interrogation, high bail demands, and periods of detention without access to lawyers or clear information about charges. Human Rights Watch found that prosecutions often criminalized ordinary manifestations of religious identity and peaceful community life by treating prayer meetings, religious education, marriages, burials, or membership in the Baháʼí community as evidence of an illegal organization or a threat to national security. On 21 October 2019, Intelligence Ministry officers arrested Shiraz residents Farzan Masoumi, Kiana Shoaei, and Soroush Abadi. Officers searched their homes and confiscated mobile telephones, computers, laptops, and other belongings. HRANA reported that the three were held at an undisclosed location. In 2022, the Baháʼí International Community reported that more than 1,000 Baháʼís were in legal “limbo” between arrest, hearings, sentencing, and summonses to begin prison terms.

The pattern has been geographically widespread rather than confined to Tehran. Arrests, raids, trials, and prison sentences have been reported in cities including Shiraz, Isfahan, Karaj, Kerman, Yazd, Tabriz, Rasht, Babol, Qaem Shahr, Gorgan, Ahvaz, Birjand, Bojnord, Sanandaj, Kermanshah, and Sari. HRANA documented at least 284 arrests and 270 summonses between August 2020 and August 2025, together with 419 home searches and 147 trials; the largest numbers of documented reports came from Tehran, Fars, Mazandaran, Isfahan, and Alborz provinces. Iran Press Watch and the Center for Human Rights in Iran reported in 2024 that more than 1,200 Baháʼís were facing court proceedings or had received prison sentences, illustrating the large number of people moving through the security and judicial system even when they were not all imprisoned simultaneously. The nationwide pattern continued in 2026, when the Center for Human Rights in Iran reported coordinated arrests and raids affecting dozens of families in Shiraz, Kerman, Mashhad, Yazd, Sari, Karaj, Isfahan, Tabriz, Semnan, Borujerd, and Aligudarz.

Charges have commonly included “propaganda against the regime”, “acting against national security”, forming or belonging to an illegal group, and “educational or propaganda activities contrary to Islamic Sharia”. Human Rights Watch concluded that these broadly worded offences have been used to punish Baháʼís for their identity and for peaceful religious, educational, and community activities rather than for recognizably criminal conduct.

===== Political crises, scapegoating, and targeting of women =====
Periods of political unrest and national crisis have repeatedly been accompanied by heightened pressure on Baháʼís. During broad security crackdowns, authorities and state-affiliated media have accused Baháʼís of assisting opposition movements, foreign governments, Israel, or “Zionism”, with arrest campaigns following or coinciding with such allegations. Human Rights Watch noted that as the authorities suppressed nationwide protests demanding political, economic, and social change, they also raided Baháʼí homes, arrested community members, and confiscated property. Similar patterns were reported during the unrest following the 2009 presidential election, after the 2022 Woman, Life, Freedom movement, and during later national crises, when Baháʼís were again portrayed as internal enemies or foreign agents.

Baháʼí women have been disproportionately affected by the more recent arrest campaigns. The Baháʼí International Community reported that arrests and summonses of women rose sharply after the 2022 uprising and that women constituted about two-thirds of Baháʼí prisoners in 2024; by early March of that year, 72 of the 93 Baháʼís summoned to court or prison were women. HRANA documented repeated collective prosecutions of Baháʼí women in Isfahan, Kerman, Hamadan, and other provinces, often on charges connected with children’s classes, educational work, or peaceful religious activity.

===== Arrests connected to education and social service =====
A recurring feature of the prosecutions has been the treatment of peaceful educational, charitable, environmental, and neighbourhood activities as security or religious offences. Baháʼís have been arrested for teaching children who are excluded from school, assisting Afghan refugee children, organizing literacy or arts classes, participating in environmental initiatives, and providing higher education to Baháʼí students barred from universities. Courts have frequently described such activities as covert religious “propaganda”, action against national security, or conduct contrary to Islam.

===== Arrest of 54 young people in Shiraz =====
On 19 May 2006, officials arrested 54 Baháʼís, most of them young people, in Shiraz. The group had been participating in a community-service programme that offered classes to underprivileged children and was initiated by a local non-governmental organization. Representatives of the Baháʼí community stated that the group possessed a letter of permission from the Islamic Council of Shiraz.

A detainee under the age of fifteen was released on the day of the arrests, as were several non-Baháʼí young people who had been participating in the programme. The arrests coincided with searches of six Baháʼí homes in which notebooks, computers, books, and other documents were confiscated. Human Rights Watch and the Baháʼí World News Service also reported that seven other Baháʼís had been detained for periods of up to one month in Kermanshah, Isfahan, and Tehran since the beginning of that year.

On 24 May, fourteen of the detainees were released after providing property deeds valued at ten million tomans as security. The following day, 36 others were released on personal guarantees or after depositing work licences with the court. The final three were released on 14 June. Although a judge had initially demanded a larger bond, they were ultimately released without bail after promising to appear when summoned. In most cases, however, the authorities required property deeds or other security before release.

At that stage, no formal charges had been filed against the final three detainees. The same report stated that two Baháʼís arrested separately in Tehran and Sanandaj remained imprisoned.

In January 2007, the judiciary sentenced members of the group for propaganda against the government. Fifty-one received suspended one-year prison terms conditional on attending courses organized by the Islamic Propaganda Organization. Amnesty International stated that the detainees had been targeted solely for their religious beliefs or their peaceful work teaching underprivileged children.

===== Raids on the Baháʼí Institute for Higher Education =====
The Baháʼí Institute for Higher Education (BIHE), established in 1987 to provide university-level education to Baháʼís excluded from Iranian universities, has been repeatedly subjected to raids, confiscations, and arrests. In September and October 1998, security forces conducted sweeping raids, arrested at least 36 members of the faculty and staff, and seized equipment and records kept in more than 500 homes. Further operations were carried out in 2001 and 2003.

A major coordinated operation took place in May 2011, during Ahmadinejad’s presidency. Agents raided approximately 40 homes associated with the BIHE in Tehran, Karaj, Shiraz, Isfahan and other cities, and arrested 17 educators and administrators. Thirteen people arrested in that operation or subsequently prosecuted for their BIHE work received prison terms, most of four or five years on broad accusations including membership in the “perverse sect of Bahaism” and activity against national security. Human Rights Watch described the BIHE as a peaceful educational response to state exclusion, reporting that the authorities arrested and jailed dozens of people who were affiliated with it.

The prosecutions were not based on allegations of violence or conventional criminal conduct, but on teaching, administering courses, providing laboratory facilities, or otherwise helping students who were denied access to higher education. Several BIHE educators served multi-year prison terms, and subsequent cases have continued to treat teaching or collaboration with the institute as evidence of an offence.

===== Other social and community projects =====
Other prosecutions have similarly concerned projects benefiting the wider public. In 2018, six Baháʼís involved in environmental activities were arrested in Shiraz during a wider crackdown on environmentalists. Baháʼí women have also been prosecuted for literacy, language, arts, music, psychology, and other classes being offered to Iranian and Afghan children. Samin Ehsani was charged in connection with literacy classes for Afghan children who lacked birth certificates and were consequently excluded from school. Anisa Fanaian likewise received a lengthy prison sentence in a case in which her tutoring of Afghan refugee children excluded from school was cited as evidence against her.

These cases form part of a broader pattern in which activities ordinarily understood as education, charitable assistance, environmental work, or community development, are reclassified as religious propaganda or security offences when conducted by Baháʼís. The resulting arrests have affected both formal educators and people participating informally in neighbourhood projects.

===== Arrest of Baháʼí leaders =====
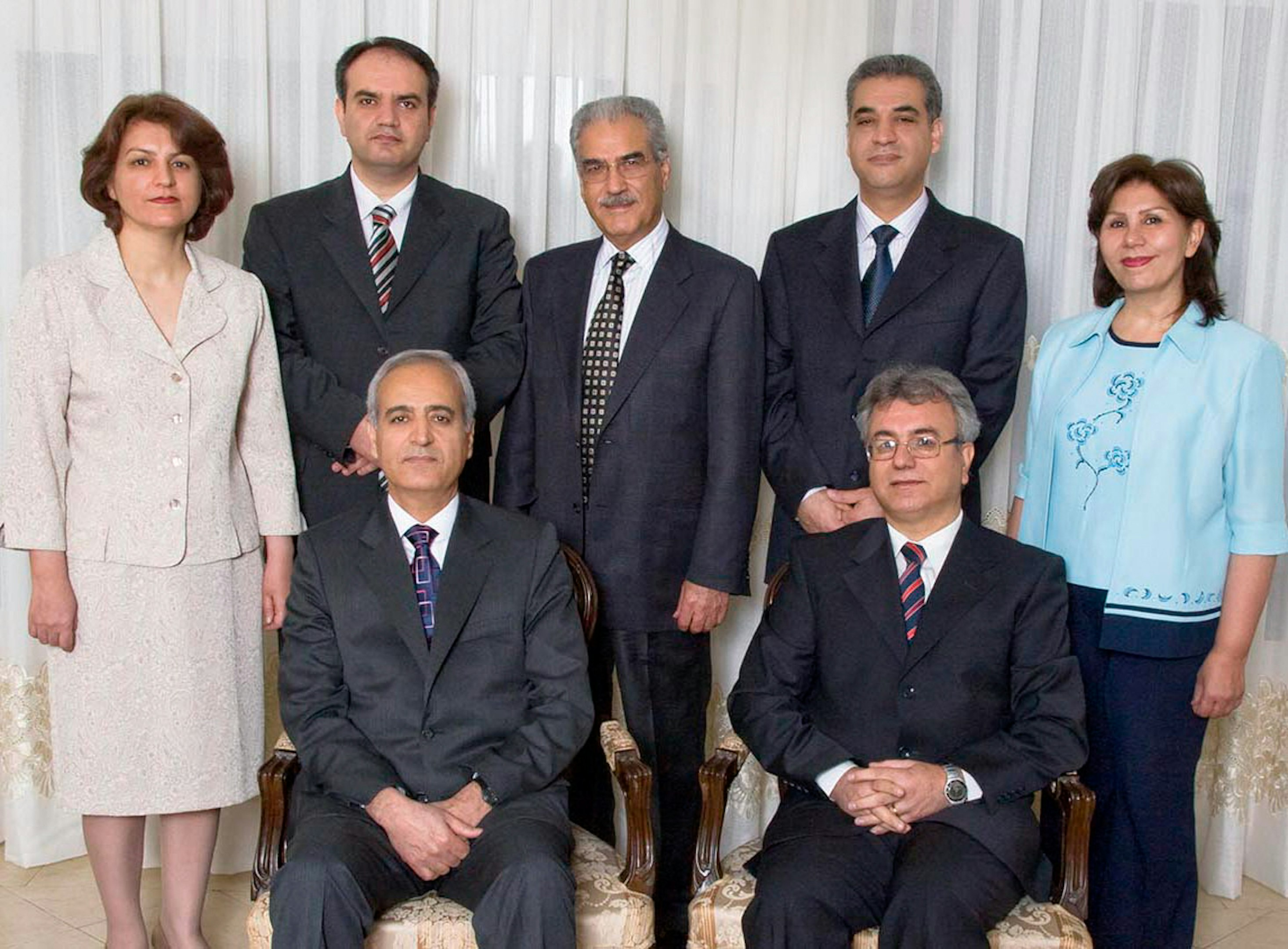
The seven members of the Yaran, arrested in 2008

On 14 May 2008, six members of the informal body known as the Friends, or Yaran, which attended to the needs of the Baháʼí community in Iran, were arrested and taken to Evin Prison. Officers from the Ministry of Intelligence searched their homes in Tehran in the early hours of 14 May. The arrests followed the detention in March of the seventh member, who had initially been questioned about the burial of a Baháʼí in the Baháʼí cemetery in Mashhad.

The Iran Human Rights Documentation Center expressed concern for the detainees’ safety and compared the arrests with the disappearance of Baháʼí representatives in the early 1980s. Amnesty International issued action alerts concerning the arrests. By the end of 2008, all seven members of the Yaran and at least 40 other Baháʼís were imprisoned in Iran. On 17 February 2009, the state-run news agency IRNA reported that the seven had been formally accused of espionage, and in June 2008, Nobel laureate Shirin Ebadi volunteered to represent them, subsequently receiving threats connected with her defence of the Baháʼí community. Her Center for the Defense of Human Rights was raided and closed in December 2008, and security officers later searched her private law office and seized files and computers. A second lawyer associated with the case, Abdolfattah Soltani, was reported missing after his arrest in June 2009.

The trial was repeatedly postponed before beginning on 12 January 2010. No independent observers were permitted in the courtroom, and the defence lawyers, who had been given little access to the detainees, reportedly encountered difficulty entering the court. Further sessions were held on 7 February, 12 April, and 12 June 2010.

In August 2010, each of the seven was sentenced to twenty years in prison, initially reduced to ten years and restored to twenty in March 2011. All seven were transferred to Gohardasht Prison following sentencing, and ultimately released after serving ten years.

There were widespread calls from public figures, governments, and organizations for their release, particularly after the trial was announced in February 2009. Officials and legislators in Brazil, the United States, Canada, Germany, the United Kingdom, the Netherlands, Spain, and Australia issued statements or sponsored resolutions condemning the arrests. The Presidency of the European Union, supported by associated countries, also denounced the proceedings, as did human rights organizations. Amnesty International issued a series of action alerts, and the World Organisation Against Torture proposed measures to secure the release of the Yaran and other detainees. The United States Commission on International Religious Freedom called for the seven to be freed rather than tried.

In February 2009, 267 non-Baháʼí Iranian academics, writers, artists, journalists, and activists signed an open letter apologizing for the long silence surrounding the denial of Baháʼí rights and pledging support for the rights set out in the Universal Declaration of Human Rights. British entertainers published a letter in The Times supporting the detainees, and scholars specializing in Iranian and Middle Eastern studies also protested. Others who spoke publicly included Rainn Wilson and Shohreh Aghdashloo.

In February 2010, authorities detained five additional Baháʼís, reportedly including Niki Khanjani, the daughter of Jamaloddin Khanjani.

Authorities arrested Fariba Kamalabadi and Mahvash Sabet again in July 2022 during the renewed nationwide campaign. Both women were subsequently sentenced to additional ten-year prison terms on charges connected with managing an illegal religious organization and acting against national security; the sentences were upheld on appeal in 2023. In August 2023, authorities arrested eleven more Baháʼís, including Jamaloddin Khanjani, then aged 90, and his daughter Maria Khanjani.

===== Surveillance and related arrests =====
A confidential letter sent on 29 October 2005 by the chairman of the Command Headquarters of the Armed Forces stated that Supreme Leader Ali Khamenei had instructed the headquarters to identify Baháʼís, monitor their activities, and collect information about members of the community. The letter was addressed to the Ministry of Intelligence, the Islamic Revolutionary Guard Corps, and the police. Asma Jahangir, then United Nations Special Rapporteur on freedom of religion or belief, brought the letter to international attention in March 2006.

Jahangir stated that surveillance based solely on religious affiliation constituted an impermissible interference with minority rights and warned that the information collected could be used to intensify discrimination and persecution.

Other official correspondence also concerned the monitoring of Baháʼís. A letter dated 2 May 2006 from the Trades, Production, and Technical Services Society of Kermanshah asked the Iranian Union of Battery Manufacturers to identify members of the “Baha'i sect” within the union. On 19 August 2006, the Ministry of the Interior instructed provincial political and security offices to increase surveillance of Baháʼís. A questionnaire accompanying the instruction requested information about local Baháʼís’ financial circumstances and social relationships.

The Anti-Defamation League compared the effort to identify and monitor Baháʼís to early measures directed against Jews in Nazi Germany and described the orders as reminiscent of steps that led to the institution of the Nuremberg Laws.

In March 2005, intelligence agents searched several Baháʼí homes in Tehran, confiscated possessions, and detained residents. Diane Ala'i, a representative of the Baháʼí International Community to the United Nations in Geneva, reported that five Baháʼís had been imprisoned during the preceding month. Two were released on bail, while the whereabouts of others were initially unknown; two other Baháʼís who had previously been detained briefly simply for distributing copies of a courteous letter to President Mohammad Khatami, received the maximum sentence for this alleged offence.

In December 2005, the Baháʼí International Community reported that at least 59 Baháʼís had been subjected to arbitrary arrest, detention, or imprisonment and that nine remained imprisoned as of late October. It also reported renewed denial of university access to Baháʼí students.

==== Deaths and death sentences after the 1980s ====
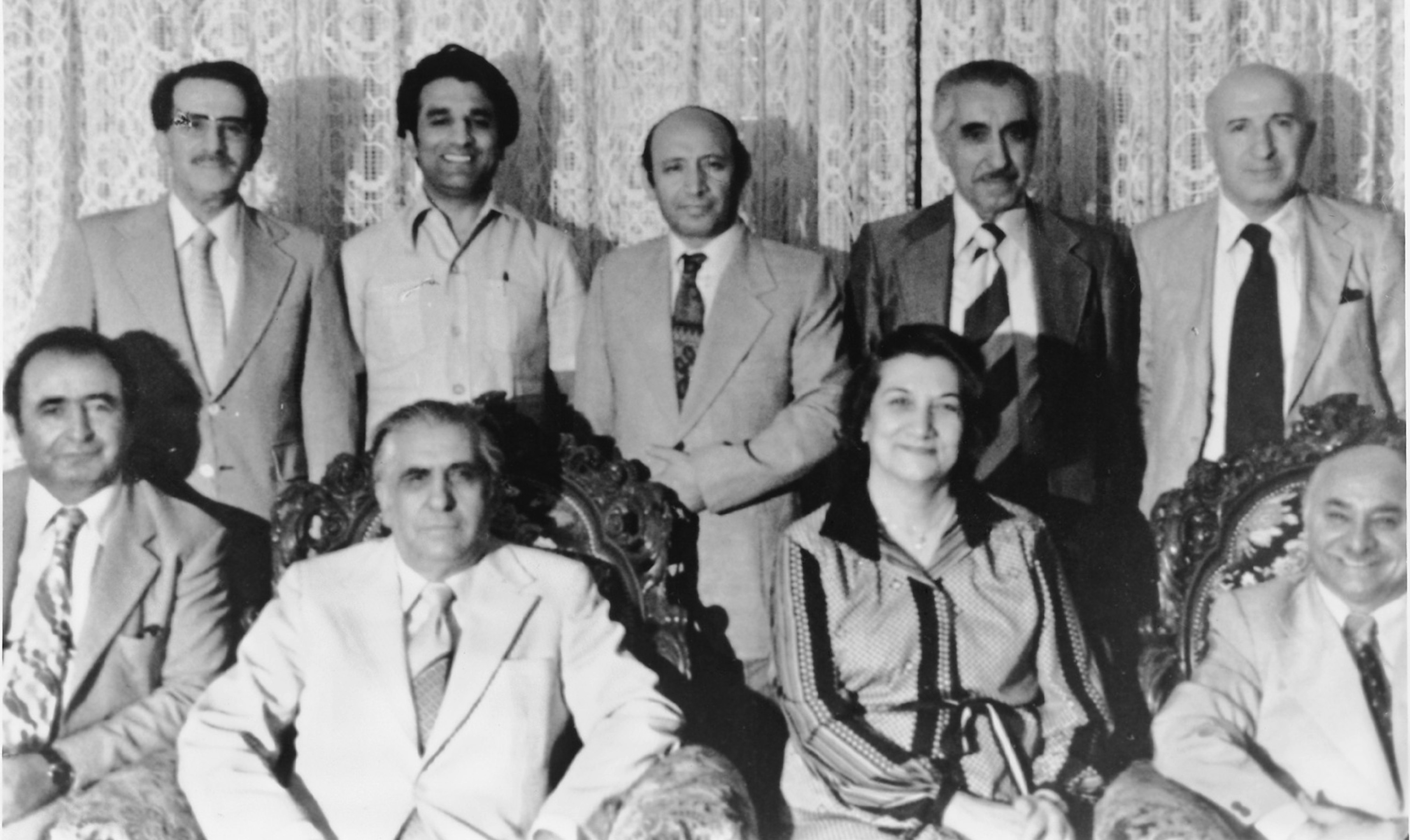
Members of the Bahá’í National Spiritual Assembly of Iran who disappeared in August 1980. All are presumed to have been executed.

During the first years of the Islamic Republic, well over 200 Baháʼís were killed, executed, or forcibly disappeared, many of them elected community representatives or other prominent Baháʼís; hundreds more were tortured or imprisoned. The authorities systematically targeted three successive National Spiritual Assemblies. Ali Murad Davudi, secretary of the National Spiritual Assembly, disappeared in November 1979, and on 21 August 1980, all nine members of the National Spiritual Assembly then serving, together with two members of the Auxiliary Board, were arrested during a meeting and forcibly disappeared. Their fate has never been officially disclosed, and they are presumed to have been executed. Then-speaker of parliament Akbar Hashemi Rafsanjani stated on 10 September 1980 that an order had been issued for the arrests, but on 9 October denied that any members of the National Spiritual Assembly had been arrested. Reports subsequently indicated that the nine may at one point have been held in Evin Prison, although the authorities never disclosed their fate. Eight of the nine members of the replacement assembly were arrested on 13 December 1981 and executed without trial on 27 December 1981. After Baháʼí administrative institutions were prohibited and the third National Spiritual Assembly dissolved itself in August 1983, seven of its former members were arrested, imprisoned, tortured, and executed between May 1984 and September 1987.

Members of Local Spiritual Assemblies and other prominent Baháʼís were also arrested, tortured, forcibly disappeared, or executed in Tehran, Karaj, Yazd, Tabriz, Hamadan, Shiraz, and numerous smaller cities, towns, and villages. Among the documented cases, at least eight prominent Baháʼís were killed in Tehran between April 1979 and December 1980. Seven Baháʼís were executed in Yazd after a partly televised trial. In Tabriz, two prominent Baháʼís were executed in 1979, followed by all nine members of the city’s Local Spiritual Assembly in 1981. Seven members of the Hamadan Local Spiritual Assembly were executed by firing squad; signs of torture were reportedly found on the bodies of six. In Shiraz, five prominent Baháʼís were executed and more than 85 were arrested for interrogation between 1978 and 1981. In 1983, sixteen Baháʼís were executed in Shiraz, including ten women. Amnesty International later reported that at least 201 Baháʼís had been executed, predominantly during the 1980s.

The most recent confirmed execution of a Baháʼí on religiously connected charges occurred in 1998, when Ruhollah Rohani was hanged in Mashhad. He had been accused of converting a woman to the Baháʼí Faith, although she stated that she had been raised as a Baháʼí. Death sentences were also imposed on Sirus Zabhi-Moghaddam and Hedayat Kashefi-Najabadi but were not carried out, while Ataollah Hamid Nazrizadeh received a ten-year prison sentence in connection with the same case.

On 15 December 2005, 59 year-old Zabihullah Mahrami died in government custody in Yazd, having initially been arrested on charges of apostasy but ultimately convicted of espionage. He was sentenced to death in 1996, but following an international outcry the sentence was commuted to life imprisonment in Yazd, where he was reported to have been forced to undertake grueling physical labour and death threats. When, following ten years of imprisonment, he died in his prison cell under disputed circumstances, the United States condemned Iran for persecuting him due to his religion.

Later killings included those of Ataollah Rezvani and Farhang Amiri. Rezvani, a prominent Baháʼí in Bandar Abbas, was discovered to have been shot in the back of the head in his car on 24 August 2013 after reportedly receiving telephone calls from unknown callers. Farhang Amiri, a 63-year-old Baháʼí, was stabbed to death outside his home in Yazd on 26 September 2016. The Baháʼí International Community described the killing as religiously motivated, and one of the assailants was reported to have stated that Amiri was attacked because he was a Baháʼí.

==== Torture and other ill-treatment ====
Historical accounts from the 1980s document the torture of Baháʼí prisoners, prolonged solitary confinement, and pressure to recant their faith publicly or confess to false espionage allegations. More recent cases have included beatings, electric shocks, mock executions, prolonged solitary confinement, denial of food or medical care, and coerced confessions.

In December 2025, Human Rights Watch and the Baháʼí International Community reported that many of the 26 Baháʼís in Shiraz whose criminal cases had been reopened had been subjected to torture and other ill-treatment at the time of their initial arrests in 2016. The same report described the violent arrest in Karaj of Nahid Behrouzi which took place in August 2024 without a warrant, and during which she suffered bruising and a nosebleed. She was subsequently held for 65 days without access to a lawyer or adequate medical care.

In April 2026, Amnesty International reported that cousins Peyvand Naimi and Borna Naimi had been subjected to beatings, mock executions, and electric shocks in an effort to obtain forced “confessions” to capital offences connected with the January 2026 protests. Amnesty stated that they had also been denied access to lawyers and adequate medical care. According to reporting by the Associated Press, Peyvand Naimi was held in solitary confinement for more than two months, told his family that he had been denied food during a period of harsh treatment, and appeared in a televised confession that his family said had been obtained under duress. The Associated Press also reported that other detained Baháʼís had been subjected to electric shocks and mock hangings and had been compelled to confess to offences punishable by death.

==== Barriers to education ====
Baháʼí students have been systematically excluded from Iranian universities. Applicants have been required to identify themselves as adherents of one of the religions recognized by the state, denied examination results, classified as having “incomplete files”, prevented from registering after admission, or expelled after their Baháʼí identity became known. The government has stated that Baháʼís could enrol if they identified themselves as Muslims, but Baháʼís generally refuse to conceal or misrepresent their religious beliefs.

Writing in The Iranian in 2002, columnist Iqbal Latif characterized the systematic exclusion of Baháʼís from higher education as “intellectual cleansing of their ethnic brothers by the clergy-dominated regime”.

An investigation by the Committee of Concerned Scientists found that university officials had received instructions not to score the tests of Baháʼí students or had suggested that results would be released only if the applicants’ families renounced the Baháʼí Faith. The committee called for all test results to be published without discrimination.

In response to their exclusion, Baháʼís established an informal programme of higher education in 1987 that developed into the Baháʼí Institute for Higher Education (BIHE). The New York Times described it as “an elaborate act of communal self-preservation”. Classes were initially held in private homes and served approximately 900 students. Between 29 September and 2 October 1998, security forces raided more than 500 homes and offices in at least fourteen cities in an effort to dismantle the institution. Hundreds of people were arrested, and books, computers, and personal property were confiscated. Agents also reportedly removed household possessions, including silverware and refrigerators, conduct that Sciolino described as “thievery in the name of Islam”.

Human Rights Watch reported that a 2018 decision by Branch 40 of the Court of Administrative Justice upheld the denial of admission to a Baháʼí applicant and referred to policies derived from the 1991 memorandum.

The exclusion has also affected school pupils. Baháʼí children have at times been expelled after identifying their religion or objecting to derogatory material about their beliefs. In 2019, the education minister stated that students could be prevented from continuing their education if openly identifying with an unrecognized religion was considered proselytism.

==== Economic strangulation and property confiscation ====
The 1991 memorandum on the “Baháʼí question” called for the “progress and development” of the Baháʼí community to be blocked by restricting its educational and economic opportunities. Baháʼís are barred from most public-sector employment, and hundreds who were dismissed after the 1979 revolution were denied pensions and retirement benefits. Authorities have also denied professional and business licences, pressured private employers to dismiss Baháʼí workers, and closed Baháʼí-owned businesses. Human Rights Watch described the combined effect of these policies as the economic strangulation of the community.

The restrictions have included the mass closure of small businesses. In November 2016, authorities in Mazandaran province closed at least 94 Baháʼí-owned businesses after their owners observed Baháʼí holy days. Although an administrative court ordered that the businesses be reopened in 2017, nineteen businesses in Sari reportedly remained closed three years later. Human Rights Watch also cited monitoring data recording hundreds of business closures during the late 2010s and early 2020s, some of which lasted for years. In Semnan province, authorities closed at least twenty shops, two factories, and two agricultural businesses owned by Baháʼís beginning in 2012.

At least 640 properties were seized between 1980 and 2026 according to the United Nations Special Rapporteur on adequate housing, Miloon Kothari, including houses, agricultural land and Baháʼí shrines and cemeteries. In more recent cases, revolutionary courts have relied on article 49 of the Constitution to transfer Baháʼí property to the Headquarters for the Execution of Imam Khomeini's Order, commonly known as EIKO or Setad. In 2005, six Baháʼí families were reported to have lost their homes and land, depriving them of their principal means of livelihood. Between 2004 and 2006 the number of prominent Baháʼís and Baháʼí leaders being arrested without charge and then released without bail increased, often requiring families to pledge homes or land as security, a practice which Miloon Kothari described as a possible additional method of expropriation. During the same period, at least 129 Baháʼís were reported to have been arrested and released pending trial on bail which frequently consisted of money, property deeds, or business and professional licences. Reports in 2025 indicated that some Baháʼís and their lawyers continued to encounter resistance when seeking the return of property deeds pledged as bail after judicial proceedings.

In rural communities across Iran, Baháʼí residents have been forcibly displaced and their homes, farmland, or other properties confiscated, demolished, or transferred to state-controlled bodies. Documented cases include Ivel, Roshankouh, and Ahmadabad in Mazandaran province; Korus in Semnan province; Kerogan in Markazi province; Matnagh in East Azerbaijan province; and Kata in Kohgiluyeh and Boyer-Ahmad province. Business closures and other confiscations of homes, commercial premises, vehicles, bank accounts, and personal assets have also been documented in Sari and elsewhere in Mazandaran, as well as in Semnan and Isfahan.

In the village of Ivel, also transliterated as Eyval, in Mazandaran province, Baháʼí residents had faced displacement and attacks on their homes for decades. In 2010 approximately fifty Baháʼí-owned houses were burned and demolished, despite warnings from the Baháʼí residents to the local authorities of possible attacks. In November 2019, a special court authorized EIKO to confiscate land belonging to Baháʼí families on the explicit ground that their religious beliefs invalidated their ownership rights. An appeals court upheld the decision in October 2020, affecting property belonging to 27 families, and a further appeal was rejected in October 2021.

In the village of Kata in Kohgiluyeh and Boyer-Ahmad province, thirteen parcels of irrigated farmland confiscated from Baháʼí families were advertised for auction in 2021. The Baháʼí International Community stated that the land was offered at approximately 15 per cent of its market value and that the original owners were prohibited from bidding to recover it. Court documents reviewed by Human Rights Watch indicated that the owners’ Baháʼí religious activities had been cited as a basis for the confiscations.

Since 2916 the authorities had been attempting to take properties in the village of Roshankouh, near Sari in Mazandaran province, by claiming that they were encroaching on protected land despite the fact that the families possessed deeds, with some having cultivated the land for more than a century; adjacent non-Baháʼí homes were left intact. In 2021 the authorities demolished two Baháʼí houses under construction and confiscated around one hectare of land, and on 2 August 2022 up to 200 government and local agents sealed off the village, demolished six Baháʼí homes, and confiscated approximately twenty hectares of farmland. Amnesty International reported that due to the recent confiscations at least eighteen farmers were deprived of their livelihoods.

In Ahmadabad, near Sari, police officers and forest rangers acting on the order of the Sari prosecutor seized approximately sixty hectares of Baháʼí-owned agricultural land in January 2024. Reports stated that the properties included farmland, rice paddies, and walnut orchards. In May 2024, government agents bulldozed rice fields and destroyed crops on land that had been fenced off during the earlier seizure.

In Semnan, courts ordered the confiscation of privately owned Baháʼí properties and their transfer to EIKO, relying on allegations that the properties were associated with an illegal organization or foreign espionage. An appellate court upheld the orders in 2022.

The use of asset confiscation intensified further in 2025. Human Rights Watch and the Baháʼí International Community reported that authorities in Isfahan province invoked article 49 to confiscate legitimate assets belonging to twenty Baháʼís, including homes, vehicles, bank accounts, and other property, without adequate due process. The confiscations occurred alongside prison sentences of between five and ten years imposed on ten Baháʼí women in Isfahan for charges connected with peaceful religious and educational activities.

==== Destruction of holy sites and burial restrictionsI ====
House of the Báb in Shiraz before its demolition in 1979 and replacement by an Islamic religious complex

In September 1979, following the start of the revolution, the authorities began demolishing the House of the Báb in Shiraz, the site initially being converted into a road and public square and later replaced by a mosque. The house of Baháʼu'lláh in Takur, Mazandaran province, was demolished and offered for sale soon after the revolution, and in April 2004 the shrine and gravesite of Quddús was destroyed in Babol. Two months later the home of Mírzá ʻAbbás Núrí, Baháʼu'lláh’s father, who had been an eminent provincial governor and one of Iran's greatest calligraphers, was destroyed in Tehran.

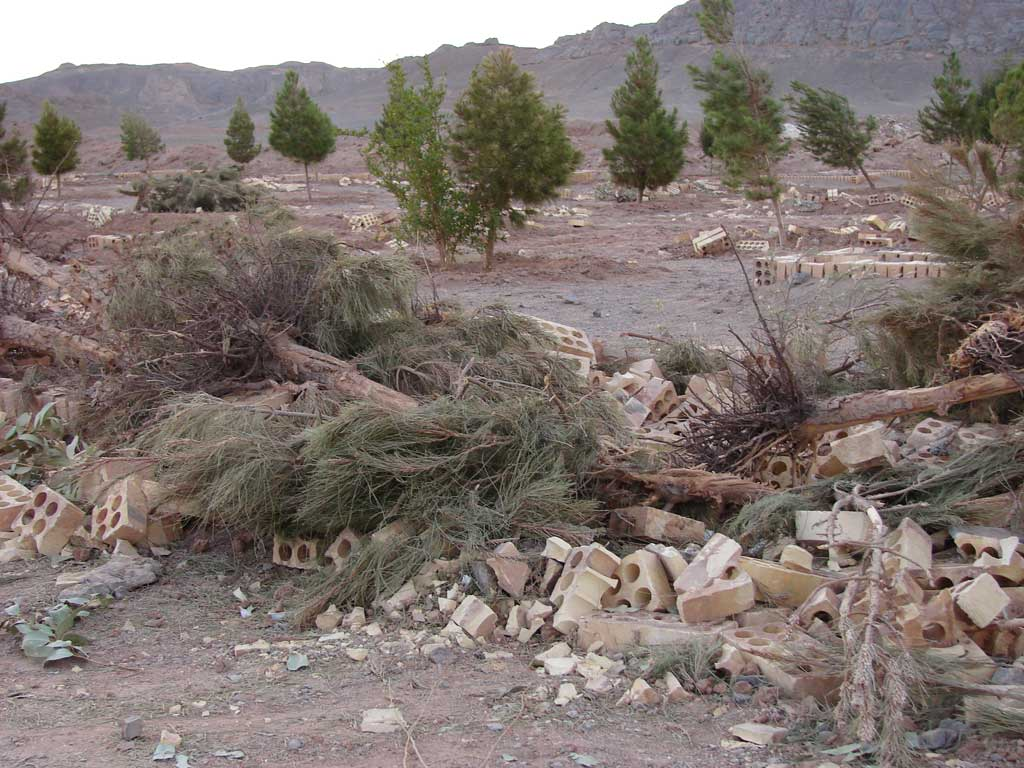
The Baháʼí cemetery in Yazd

Baháʼí cemeteries throughout Iran have repeatedly been confiscated, bulldozed, desecrated, or converted to other uses, while families have been prevented from burying their relatives according to Baháʼí religious practices. In April 2005, Diane Ala'i reported to the United Nations Commission on Human Rights that several Baháʼís in Yazd had been assaulted in their homes, a Baháʼí-owned shop had been burned, and the local Baháʼí cemetery had been driven over by vehicles. Gravestones were smashed and human remains were left exposed.

Before the 1979 revolution, the Baháʼí community of Tehran owned and maintained a landscaped cemetery of approximately 80,000 square metres containing more than 15,000 graves. The cemetery was confiscated in 1980, its gravestones removed or sold, and the grounds levelled. In the 1990s, human remains were reportedly exhumed and removed before the site was cleared for the construction of the Khavaran Cultural Center. Authorities later transferred to the community a smaller, barren plot near Khavaran, adjacent to the Armenian cemetery and to land containing the mass graves of political prisoners executed during the 1980s. The Baháʼí community developed the replacement property at its own expense, constructing a mortuary, walls, gates, and other facilities.

Beginning in 2021, the authorities prevented Baháʼís from using unused plots in the replacement cemetery and told families either to bury their relatives in the narrow spaces between existing graves or to use adjacent land known to contain the mass graves of political prisoners. Simin Fahandej, a representative of the Baháʼí International Community, stated that officials were “forcing the Baháʼís to bury their dead in the mass graves of Khavaran”. Baháʼí families refused to consent to such burials out of respect for the political prisoners buried there and for their surviving relatives.

The Baháʼí International Community reported that an agent of the Ministry of Intelligence assumed control of the Tehran Baháʼí cemetery in 2021 and interfered with burial arrangements and religious rites. In 2023, the agent demanded what the organization described as exorbitant fees before permitting burials in plots already owned and developed by the Baháʼí community. Families were threatened that, if they did not pay, their relatives would be buried without notice in the adjacent mass-grave area. At least six deceased Baháʼís were subsequently buried without the knowledge or consent of their families and without Baháʼí funeral rites. Several Baháʼís who assisted families with burials or sought legal permission to bury relatives were also arrested. Human Rights Watch reported that by November 2023 scores of deceased Baháʼís had been buried without family permission and that authorities had delayed the release of bodies, imposed unusually high burial fees, and pressured families to accept arrangements contrary to their religious practices.

Restrictions on burial have also been imposed outside Tehran. Reports published in 2015 stated that authorities had designated only one city in each province where Baháʼís could maintain a cemetery and bury their deceased. Due to this policy some families have been forced to transport the bodies of their loved ones long distances, resulting in delayed funerals and separation of the deceased from their home communities. For example, authorities refused permission for a Baháʼí woman from Sanandaj to be buried in the local Baháʼí cemetery and insisted that her body be transported to Qorveh, approximately 90 kilometres away. In Kerman province, the closure of the Baháʼí cemetery in Kerman reportedly left Rafsanjan as the only available burial location for Baháʼís in the province.

==== Systematic state-sponsored propaganda and incitement ====
Iranian state institutions and state-affiliated media have conducted a sustained campaign of propaganda, disinformation, and incitement against the Baháʼí community. Human Rights Watch described the campaign as part of the systematic state policy of persecution. In the final months of 2005, Iranian newspapers and radio stations conducted an intensive campaign against the Baháʼí Faith. The state-run newspaper Kayhan, whose managing editor is appointed by the Supreme Leader, published nearly three dozen defamatory articles. The articles relied partly on fabricated documents and distorted Baháʼí teachings in ways intended to provoke hostility among Muslim readers.

In November 2009, the newspaper Hamshahri was temporarily closed after a tourism advertisement included a photograph of a Baháʼí temple in India. After the disputed 2009 Iranian presidential election, officials and state media accused Baháʼís of involvement in the protests, although observers stated that the accusations lacked evidence.

Abbas Amanat has argued that Iranian authorities historically defined Baháʼís as an “other” in order to divert public attention from government failures. In October 2011, the Baháʼí International Community published Inciting Hatred: Iran's Media Campaign to Demonize Baha'is, which examined media items published between late 2009 and early 2011.

Human Rights Watch reported that monitored state-sponsored outlets and accounts produced more than 10,000 items of anti-Baháʼí content during 2022. In 2023, an online campaign praised nineteenth-century violence against Bábís and encouraged violence against contemporary Baháʼís.

During the intensified repression of 2026, state television and state-affiliated social-media accounts accused Baháʼís of collaborating with Israel and blamed them for Iran’s political and economic difficulties. In May, a publicly accessible exhibition in Mazandaran province depicted Baháʼís as enemies of the state. A representative of the Supreme Leader who attended the exhibition described Baháʼís as spies and argued that they should be prohibited from owning property.

=== International responses and solidarity ===
Since the latter part of the twentieth century, international organizations, governments, legislators, human rights groups, scholars, and public figures have repeatedly called on Iran to respect the rights of Baháʼís. The United Nations, Amnesty International, the European Union, and governments including those of the United States, Brazil, Australia, New Zealand, Austria, Canada, the United Kingdom, Germany, France, the Netherlands, Ireland, Hungary, Norway, and India have issued statements condemning the treatment of Baháʼís, particularly in Iran.

==== International assessments and condemnations ====
The United Nations and the former United Nations Commission on Human Rights have documented the persecution of Baháʼís in Iran since 1979. From 1984 until the replacement of the Commission by the Human Rights Council, resolutions were repeatedly adopted expressing concern about human rights violations against Baháʼís.

In their response to inquiries from the international community, statements from various Iranian embassies, including Canada, as well as from the Permanent Mission of the Islamic Republic of Iran to the United Nations (1982), have claimed repeatedly that Baháʼís are supporters of the former Shah, collaborators with SAVAK, spies working for imperialist western governments, and enemies of state. Before his return to Iran, Ruhollah Khomeini described Baháʼís as traitors and Zionists. Between 1982 and 1984, Iranian representatives attempted to persuade United Nations diplomats that the Baháʼí Faith was a political organization engaged in criminal activity rather than a religion. United Nations assessments rejected these allegations and noted that Baháʼí teachings require obedience to government and prohibit subversive activity.

In 1993, Reynaldo Galindo Pohl, the Special Representative of the Commission on Human Rights on Iran, reported on the situation of the Baháʼí community. In 1995, the Commission on Human Rights referred to the Baháʼís as a community “whose existence as a viable religious community in the Islamic Republic of Iran is threatened”. Following a 1995 visit to Iran, Special Rapporteur on religious intolerance Abdelfattah Amor examined the situation of the Baháʼís in a 1996 report. Later that year, Special Representative Maurice Copithorne also reported on violations affecting the community. In its 1998 report documenting and condemning the execution of Baháʼí Ruhollah Rohani on 21 July, Amnesty International also noted having recorded at least 143 executions across Iran in 1997, and referred to their call for a lesser sentence in connection with seven Baháʼí prisoners under sentence of death.

In 2001, Mohammad Tavakoli-Targhi examined the processes through which political and religious forces in Iran considered Baháʼís as outsiders, which has contributed to their social isolation.

The European Union's 2004 annual report on human rights expressed concern about the destruction of a Baháʼí holy site in Babol and the authorities' refusal to permit the dignified reinterment of remains located there. The United States Department of State reported in the same year that the Iranian government had arbitrarily arrested Baháʼís, disregarded their property rights, confiscated private and business property, and continued to deny Baháʼí students admission to public and private universities.

In 2005, scholars examining the persecution through the framework of genocide studies included Moojan Momen, who described the history of the Bábí and Baháʼí communities in Iran as a possible case of “suspended genocide”, and in October 2005, European Commissioner Ján Figeľ described the arrest of Baháʼís as one of several serious human rights concerns in Iran. On 16 December, the United Nations General Assembly expressed serious concern about increased discrimination and other human rights violations against Baháʼís, including arbitrary arrest and detention, restrictions on communal affairs, disregard for property rights, destruction of religious sites, suspension of educational and community activities, and denial of access to higher education, employment, pensions, housing, and other benefits. Other public figures and genocide-prevention organizations including Roméo Dallaire, Genocide Watch, and the Sentinel Project for Genocide Prevention,subsequently examined the risk of mass atrocities against the community

In April 2024, Human Rights Watch concluded that the cumulative effect of Iran's decades-long, intentional, widespread, and systematic deprivation of Baháʼís' fundamental rights amounted to the crime against humanity of persecution. Its report documented arbitrary arrest and prosecution based on religious identity, exclusion from education and employment, denial of pensions and business licences, confiscation of property, restrictions on marriage and community activity, and interference with burial rights.

In October 2024, a report prepared by the Abdorrahman Boroumand Center for Human Rights in Iran in partnership with Eleos Justice at Monash University examined direct, structural, and cultural violence against Baháʼís. It described the ideology underlying the persecution as combining theological hostility with political conspiracy theories and nationalist narratives, and stated that this ideology had been encoded in law and institutionalized through state policy.

==== Iranian expressions of solidarity ====
In February 2009, a group of Iranian academics, writers, artists, journalists, and activists published an open letter to the Baháʼí community titled We Are Ashamed!. The signatories apologized for their silence in the face of the historical mistreatment of Baháʼís in Iran and pledged to support their rights under the Universal Declaration of Human Rights. The letter was initially signed by 42 people, with more than 200 additional signatories adding their names within ten days.

In April 2014, Ayatollah Abdol-Hamid Masoumi-Tehrani presented the Baháʼí community with an illuminated calligraphic work containing a passage from the writings of Baháʼu'lláh as a gesture of solidarity and an appeal for religious coexistence. Religious leaders and other prominent figures in several countries subsequently expressed support for his appeal for tolerance and coexistence.

In November 2015, Masoumi-Tehrani made a further gesture of solidarity by presenting another calligraphic work containing a passage from the writings of Baháʼu'lláh to Baháʼís who had recently been arrested in Tehran.

==== Advocacy campaigns ====
A number of international campaigns have sought to publicize particular aspects of the persecution, and mobilize support for the rights of Iranian Baháʼís.

The Education Is Not a Crime campaign was launched in November 2014 by Iranian-Canadian journalist and filmmaker Maziar Bahari, following the release of his documentary To Light a Candle. Through film screenings, murals, digital media and public events, the campaign drew attention to the exclusion of Baháʼí students from Iranian universities and to the work of the Baháʼí Institute for Higher Education.

In 2017, the Baháʼí International Community launched the Not Another Year campaign, using the hashtag #ReleaseBahai7Now, calling for the immediate release of the seven members of the Yaran who had then been imprisoned for nine years.

Following the confiscation of Baháʼí-owned property in Ivel, the 2021 #ItsTheirLand campaign called for the return of the families’ ancestral homes and farmland. The campaign received support from United Nations and European Union officials, government representatives, Muslim religious leaders, lawyers, agricultural and food-security specialists, artists, and human rights advocates.

Also in 2021, the #StopHatePropaganda campaign, known in Persian as #Iran_Without_Hate, called for an end to more than four decades of government-sponsored hate speech and disinformation against Baháʼís. The Baháʼí International Community reported that the campaign generated more than 42,000 social-media posts, reached more than 88 million people, and received support from government officials, civil-society organizations, religious leaders, artists, activists, and prominent Iranians, including Narges Mohammadi.

The #OurStoryIsOne campaign was launched in 2023 on the fortieth anniversary of the execution of ten Baháʼí women in Shiraz. It invited artistic and public contributions honouring the women and connected their deaths with the wider struggle of Iranian women of different beliefs and backgrounds for equality, justice, and freedom. The Baháʼí International Community reported that the campaign reached hundreds of millions of people and received support from artists, activists, public figures, and women prisoners in Iran.

== Egypt ==
During the mid-1860s Persian Baháʼís settled and established businesses in Egypt. Due to the persistence of the Persian authorities in monitoring Baháʼí activity through their diplomats, several Baháʼís were charged with promoting the Baháʼí Faith and imprisoned, with some being exiled briefly to Sudan. In 1868 Bahá’u’lláh sent his chronicler, Nabil-i-Zarandi, to Egypt, in order to investigate the possibility of releasing the Baháʼí prisoners, only to face arrest and imprisonment himself.

In 1894 Mirza Abu’l-Fada’il arrived in Cairo where, through his associating with the University of al-Azhar, thirty students embraced the Baháʼí Faith. Once news of the assassination of the Shah in Persia in 1896 reached Egypt it was rumoured that the assassin had been a Baháʼí, which Za`imu’d-Dawlih, an enemy of the Baháʼís, used as justification for instigating a widespread massacre of the Baháʼis. When Za`imu’d-Dawlih openly denounced the Baháʼís in the Iranian embassy, Mirza Abu’l-Fada’il leapt to their defence and, on being challenged, announced that he was also Baháʼí. Following the publishing of two books by Mirza Abu’l-Fada’il between 1897-1900, such was the alarm of the `ulama of Egypt, and of al-Azhar in particular, that they issued a decree stating that he was to be regarded as an infidel.

In 1925, Egypt became the first Islamic state to legally recognize the Baháʼí Faith as an independent religion apart from Islam. This led to more freedom for the Baháʼí community and legal recognition in the 1930s, enabling the Baháʼís to elect a National Spiritual Assembly, acquire Baháʼí centres and cemeteries, hold public events, and take part as citizens in Egyptian society. However, despite this recognition and acceptance, renewed attacks by the clergy followed, with support for and defence of the Baháʼís coming from Arab intellectuals who had had close contact with 'Abdu'l-Bahá; one of these intellectuals was the journalist and poet, ’Abbas Mahmud al-‘Aqqad, who wrote an article defending the Faith in the Al-Hildl newspaper. Attacks on the growing Baháʼí communities in small rural areas led to the issuing of a fatwa in September 1949 by Shavkh ‘Abdu’l-Majid Sali, the Head of the Fatwa Committee at al-Azhar.The fatwa, which among other things declared Baháʼí marriage as being invalid, was shared widely and formed the basis for continuing attacks on the Egyptian Baháʼí community. In 1950 two Egyptian newspapers, the Misrti’l-Fattah #692 and Mandru’l-Islain, published interviews by the same Egyptian cleric, one attacking the Baháʼís and requesting that they be treated as infidels, and the other attacking 'Abdu'l-Bahá.

Despite being an active Egyptian Baháʼí community during the early twentieth century, the current Egyptian Baháʼí community, estimated at between 1,000–2,000, has had to face religious and legal discrimination since 1960, when President Gamal Abdel Nasser, seven years after Egypt was declared a republic, issued Law 263 banning Baháʼí institutions and community activities. The government confiscated Baháʼí community properties, including Baháʼí centres, libraries and cemeteries.

Between January and April 2001,18 people, the majority of whom were Baháʼí, were arrested by the Egyptian authorities in the city of Sohag under the pretence of having violated Article 98(F) of the Penal Code, including insulting a heavenly religion and other possible charges. Despite no charges being made, their detention was renewed repeatedly, with all detainees being released without charge through September and October 2001. The periods of detention ranged from three to nine months.

In December 2003, Al-Azhar's Islamic Research Center issued a fatwa, or legal opinion, condemning Baháʼís as apostates.

During and since the 2011 Egyptian revolution tensions have remained high, with continued threats including the burning of Baháʼí homes. Regarding the revolution as an opportunity to communicate with their fellow citizens, the Egyptian Baháʼí community produced an open letter in April 2011 expressing their appreciation for the opportunity to contribute to the conversation in regard to planning for the future of Egypt. Despite remaining hopeful, the Baháʼís continue to be concerned with a Salafi spokesman writing of Baháʼís in 2012, "We will prosecute the Bahai's (sic) on the charge of treason."

=== Identification-card controversy ===
The Egyptian identification card controversy began in the 1990s when the government modernized the electronic processing of identity documents, which introduced a de facto requirement that documents must list the person's religion as Muslim, Christian, or Jewish (the only three religions officially recognized by the government). Consequently, Baháʼís were unable to obtain government identification documents (such as national identification cards, birth certificates, death certificates, marriage or divorce certificates, or passports) necessary to exercise their rights within the country unless they lied about their religion, which conflicts with Baháʼí religious principles. Without documents, they could not be employed, educated, treated in hospitals, travel outside of the country, or vote, among other hardships.

In 2006, a Baháʼí couple’s request to have their religion recorded on their official documents and those of their children sparked a major national debate on freedom of religion. On 4 April 2006, an administrative court ruled that the state had to issue the couple identity cards correctly mentioning the Baháʼí Faith, even though it was not officially recognized. Under pressure from religious and political critics, the government appealed, and on 16 December 2006, the Supreme Administrative Court overturned the ruling and upheld the policy limiting identity documents to the three recognized religions.

Following a protracted legal process culminating in a court ruling favorable to the Baháʼís, the interior minister of Egypt released a decree on April 14, 2009, amending the law to allow Egyptians who are not Muslim, Christian, or Jewish to obtain identification documents that list a dash in place of one of the three recognized religions. The first identification cards were issued to two Baháʼís under the new decree on August 8, 2009. Under this compromise solution, the Baháʼí Faith is still unrecognized by the government – Islam, Christianity, and Judaism remain the only recognized religions.

Following the 2011 Egyptian revolution and comments made by Dr. Ibrahim Ghoniem, acting Minister of Education and a member of the Muslim Brotherhood, in late 2012 it became apparent that since only three religions were recognised, excluding Baháʼí, the Egyptian school system must therefor exclude Baháʼí children, boys being specifically mentioned; the question of the 2009 ruling on ID cards was also raised.

=== Burial and funeral rights ===
In recent years, Egyptian Baháʼís have also reported restrictions affecting funeral and burial rights. Because the Baháʼí Faith is not officially recognized in Egypt, Baháʼí families have faced difficulties obtaining designated burial grounds outside Cairo, and some have had to transport deceased relatives long distances to the community’s only functioning cemetery in the capital. In 2022, Egypt’s Supreme Administrative Court rejected a petition seeking to require local authorities in Alexandria to allocate a burial site for Baháʼís, while human rights submissions to the United Nations have described the continued denial of burial grounds as part of a wider pattern of discrimination against the community.

=== Personal status, and marriage rights ===
By 2025, the Presidential Decree No.263 of 1960, dissolving Baháʼí institutions and prohibiting organized Baháʼí activities in Egypt, was still the legal basis for the community's lack of official regognition. Discriminatory practices had intensified in recent years, focused particularly on restrictions to Baháʼí marriage and family rights, access to burial and cemetaries, and official civil recognition and documentation. According to human rights organizations, administrative and religious authorities have refused to recognize Baháʼí marriages, leading to the annulment of unions, the registration of individuals as “single” in civil-status records, and the indirect deprivation of family rights connected to filiation, inheritance, and social security.

The Baháʼí International Community and several UN special rapporteurs have reported cases in which Baháʼís were denied the registration of their marriages, access to appropriate cemeteries, or recognition of their associations, and have warned of a new phase of systematic violations targeting the minority.

In January 2026, Egypt's Court of Cassation overturned a 2020 Family Court ruling that had recognized the marriage of a Baháʼí couple, following an appeal by the Ministries of Justice and Interior and the Civil Status Authority. The Court held that recognition of a Baháʼí marriage conflicted with Egypt's "public order", on the basis that legal recognition of religious marriage is restricted to Islam, Christianity and Judaism. According to the Baháʼí International Community, the ruling risks foreclosing the last legal avenue available to Baháʼí couples in Egypt to register their marriages and obtain legal recognition of their family relationships. The absence of such recognition can affect inheritance, pensions, health insurance, family registration, residency rights for foreign spouses and, in some cases, the transmission of Egyptian nationality to children.

== Qatar ==
Since at least the early 2000s, Qatari authorities have applied a policy of state-sponsored discrimination against Bahá’ís, marked by intimidation, refusal of dialogue, and the absence of effective avenues of redress for the community. Bahá’ís in Qatar have reported blacklisting, deportations, non-renewal of residency permits, employment discrimination, and restrictions affecting family unity and religious life.

Over the years the Qatari authorities have systematically attempted to blacklist and deport Baháʼís from Qatar, despite many of them being descendants of families who have lived in Qatar for generations, and predating independence. On March 31, 2021, a prominent Qatari-born Baháʼí, Omid Seioshansian, was blacklisted, expelled, and permanently denied a return on "unspecified criminal and national security charges." Qatar has terminated residency permits and made it extremely difficult to renew or grant visas, with residency and employment permits of non-Qatari Bahá’ís, including those from India, Malaysia, Jordan and Canada also denied, or not renewed.

In May 2025, Human Rights Watch reported that between 2003 and 2025 it had documented at least fourteen expulsions of Bahá’ís from Qatar for no obvious reason other than that they were followers of the Bahá’í Faith. When a deportation order was made for a Bahá’í in January 2025 with no justification, he was informed that the reason for his deportation was disrupting public order. According to a 2019 United Nations report on the issue of freedom of belief and religion, the treatment of Bahá’í’s by the Qatari authorities has caused families to be separated, loss of employment, and loss of income. In July 2025, UN experts expressed grave concern about discrimination against the Bahá’í religious minority in Qatar, including reports of arbitrary detention, lack of clear legal basis for arrests or detentions, and failure to provide written explanations, contributing to a climate of fear that discouraged victims from speaking publicly.

In August 2025, the United States Commission on International Religious Freedom condemned a five-year prison sentence imposed by a Qatari court, falsely charging Remy Rowhani, a prominent Bahá’í in Qatar, of promoting a belief that “raises doubts about the fundamental principles" of Islam. USCIRF described his sentence for blasphemy as an alarming accusation and an alarming restriction on his freedom of religion or belief. A group of UN Special Rapporteurs brought up the matter of the broader pattern of abusive treatment of Bahá’ís in Qatar, which included non-renewal of residence permits, destruction of a Bahá’í cemetery, employment discrimination, and family separations. Remy Rowhani was ultimately acquitted and released on appeal.

In April 2026, the Bahá’í International Community warned of a wave of expulsions affecting more than 40 percent of Bahá’ís residing in Qatar, describing the campaign as the “religious erasure” of a minority that had been present in the country for decades. According to the organization, the non-renewal of residence permits and other administrative pressures formed part of a long-standing pattern of discrimination, including imprisonment, family separations, and denial of employment. The Bahá’í International Community called on Qatari authorities to end the expulsions and respect Qatar’s constitutional guarantees on freedom of belief.

== Yemen ==
Harassment of the Bahá’í community in Yemen began in 2008 when, under the Presidency of Abdullah Ah Saleh, and instigated by the Muslim clergy, the authorities detained six Bahá’ís, two of whom were eventually deported. In 2013 Hamed Kamal bin Haydara was arrested on a variety of fabricated charges including espionage, with persecution intensifying in 2014-2015 when the Houthis took control. Following the Houthi takeover of Sanaa in 2014, the Houthi-Saleh authorities employed an intimidation tactic by storming an educational conference which had been organized by both the Nida Foundation for Development and the Bahá’í community, arresting more than sixty men, women and children, some of whom weren't Bahá’í. In addition, Bahá’í homes were raided, with passports, phones and documents being seized, and relatives and friends forced to pay for their release.

According to reports from the United States Commission on International Religious Freedom, since the Houthis, an armed religious-political group, rebelled against the government in 2015, they have been the cause of sectarian divisions and have repressed the country’s small Bahá’í community. In January 2018, Hamed Kamal bin Haydara was sentenced to death, with his assets confiscated and Bahá’í institutions closed. On March 22, 2020, a Houthi appeal court upheld this death sentence despite several delayed hearings, but reversing the decision on March 25, 2020. Following negotiations between the United Nations and various Houthi authorities, bin Haydara and five other Bahá’í prisoners were released, with the Houthi authorities ordering that they leave the country. In August 2020 the court accused the six released prisoners of being fugitives, demanding their return to Yemen in order to stand trial.

In May 2023 Houthi armed forces stormed a peaceful gathering, arresting 17 Bahá’ís, 5 of whom were women, and subjecting them to enforced disappearance and the denial of their rights to legal council. From June 2023 to June 2024, following international pressure,13 of the prisoners, including all 5 women, were released, with the remaining 4 being released by the end of August 2024. A precondition of their release involved the signing of pledges agreeing to refrain from involvement in Bahá’í activities, which was a blatant violation of their religious rights and freedom of belief.

== Other countries ==
=== Africa ===
Following a campaign in Africa initiated by Shoghi Effendi in April 1950, the Baháʼí Faith grew rapidly, stirring up some opposition from the secular and clerical authorities. Although territories held by the British were generally more amenable, there were nevertheless some British colonial authorities which hesitated in granting the Baháʼís complete freedom to convene conferences. Visiting teachers weren't permitted to enter Nyasaland (now Malawi) and Northern Rhodesia (now Zambia), and in general, territories governed by Spanish, Italian, Belgian and Portuguese authorities presented the most difficulties. Baháʼís had to be discreet in their activities, which involved no purchasing of community centres, and meeting privately in small numbers with no publicity at all. The authorities in Belgium-held territories refused Baháʼís entry visas, and in 1955 22 African Baháʼís from the Belgian Congo were expelled. In Italian-controlled Somaliland the Baháʼís were periodically questioned by Italian security officers, whilst in French-run colonies the officials were more inclined to accept the Baháʼí residents living there, possibly due to the fact that they tended to live in rural areas where there was less French involvement.

The Baháʼí Faith was banned in several sub-Saharan Africa countries during the late 1970s, including Burundi in 1974, Mali in 1976, Uganda in 1977, Congo in 1978, and Niger in 1978). According to some accounts these measures were principally attributed to pressure from Arab countries, some of which were alleged to be using their position as providers of development aid in order to exert pressure on donee states in relation to their treatment of the Bahá'í community. Some countries succeeded in banning the Bahá'ís for a time, but when they were able to show that they weren't anti-Islamic, or agents of Zionism, the ban was lifted in all these countries apart from Niger.

In March 1966 Eduardo Durante Viera, a Bahá’í living in Portuguese Guinea, West Africa, was murdered in prison. And in September 1979 Enoch Olinga, a Ugandan Baha’i whose conversion in 1951 was instrumental in expanding the Baháʼí Faith in Africa, was murdered in Kampala along with several members of his family.

==== Algeria ====
Following Algerian Baháʼí participation in 1968 at the first Oceanic Conference in Palermo, Sicily, and the international news coverage which followed, foreign Baháʼís living in Algeria were summoned by the police for questioning. In November 1968, during Algeria’s independence, with the adoption of Islamic practices and rejection of colonial influences, 16 Baháʼí pioneers were put under restrictions, expelled, and their properties confiscated. Baháʼís native to Algeria were also subjected to restrictions, with five being exiled to the eastern mountain regions and the Sahara. Baháʼí activities were banned in Algeria in 1969.

The 2016 Religious Freedom Report for Algeria stated that officials from the Algerian Ministry of Religious Affairs regarded religious groups, including the Bahá’í Faith, as illegitimate “sects”, as a result of which they are denied permission to operate legally. The MRA also warned publicly about the spread of religious groups including the Bahá’í Faith, stating that Algerians were facing a “religious invasion” by sects originating outside the country.

==== Morocco ====
Through the years 1962–1963 Morocco witnessed episodes of religious persecution against Bahá’ís. During the main wave of arrests 14 Bahá’ís were imprisoned, three were sentenced to death, and several others received lengthy prison sentences. There were months of diplomatic efforts; US Senator Kenneth B. Keating stated in the U.S. Senate on February 18, 1963, "How far religious freedom under the Moroccan Constitution really applies, will be revealed in the coming weeks when the appeal before the Supreme Court [of Morocco] is heard." On March 31, 1963, during a visit to the United States and the United Nations, King Hasan of Morocco was interviewed on television and addressed the audience saying that even though the Baháʼí Faith was "against good order and also morals", he would pardon the death sentences. Persecution of Baha'is occurred again in 1984, and their response was to seek diplomatic redress emphasizing the non-partisanship and the obedience to government principles of the religion. Baháʼís have more recently been denied passports and can practice their religion only in private.

=== Asia ===
==== Afghanistan ====
Baháʼís were persecuted and imprisoned in Afghanistan during the rule of the Taliban. After the fall of the Taliban, one Baháʼí was arrested and the court has ruled that the Baháʼí Faith is not a recognized religion and therefore, Baháʼís have no rights under Islamic law.

==== Azerbaijan ====
In Azerbaijan, a region that has some of the earliest connections with the Baháʼí Faith, there have been several news stories covering severe social, bureaucratic and legal limits on religious communities, including the Baháʼís, since the fall of the Soviet Union. Baháʼís are trying to recover properties that were confiscated in the 1930s. In 2004, Tavachur Aliev, a Baháʼí, claimed to have been arrested for mentioning his religion and was released when he promised not to mention his religion again. Furthermore in 2006, laws were being considered that would curtail the rights and privileges of Baháʼís and other religious minorities.

==== India ====
The Baháʼís of Jaipur registered a complaint with police that their community burial ground had been attacked by a mob of about 40-50 people "led by a sarpanch", or head of the local gram panchayat, on Friday, October 31, 2015, about 11:30am in Shri Ram Ki Nangal village. The Hindu newspaper claimed the Sarpanch was Nathu Jangid, head of the village government, a member of the right-wing Bharatiya Janata Party based on a witness statement. Baháʼí community leaders have termed it the "first" such incident in India against their community.

==== Indonesia ====
Banning orders have been made against Baháʼí activities in Indonesia (especially but not exclusively 1962–2000).

While the government gave Baháʼís the freedom to exist as an organization in 2000, the national registration system continues to restrict the religious freedom of persons who do not belong to the five officially recognized faiths; thus Baháʼís cannot register their marriages or their children's births. Couples prevented from registering their marriages or the births of their children in accordance with their faiths must either convert to one of the five recognized faiths or misrepresent themselves. Those who choose not to register their marriages or their children's births risk future difficulties; for example, many children without a birth certificate cannot enroll in school or may not qualify for scholarships and individuals without birth certificates cannot qualify for government jobs.

Muslims who converted to the Baháʼí Faith in Sulawesi were intimidated by their neighbors and by the local government in 2007. A meeting was called by the local government during which the Baháʼís were advised to decide which religion they wished to belong to, including Islam. Following a further meeting of seven households which had become Baháʼís, two returned to Islam, four refused to change, and the seventh didn’t attend the meeting.

In August 2014, following a statement by the Religious Affairs Minister, Lukman Hakim Saifuddin, in which he noted that Baháʼí worshippers would be protected by the Constitution, the Indonesian government officially recognized the monotheistic faith as a religion.

==== Iraq ====
A 1970 law prohibits the Baháʼí Faith in Iraq. A 1975 regulation forbade the issuance of national identity cards to Baháʼís until it was rescinded in 2007, but after only a few identity cards were issued to Baháʼís, their issuance was again halted.

==== Uzbekistan ====
In Uzbekistan, Baháʼís have been subject to raids and expulsions.

==== Vietnam ====
Between 1975 and 1992, the government of Vietnam forbade the open practice of the Baháʼí Faith, which appears to have precipitated a sharp drop in membership.

=== Europe ===
==== Germany ====
The Baháʼí Faith was banned by authorities in Nazi Germany in 1937.

==== Romania ====
Romania has had a Baháʼí community since 1926, whose members at that time included Marie of Edinburgh, Queen of Romania. After the fall of communism in Romania, the Romanian Baháʼí community organized itself in order to form its first National Spiritual Assembly in 1991. In 2005 the Romanian Baháʼí community numbered some 7,000, but in January 2007 a law was passed that imposed restrictive requirements on religious communities that wished to be recognized by the government, which Baháʼís and adherents of other minority religions could not meet. Some of the restrictions include waiting as long as twelve years after petitioning before a religious community can start to apply for recognition and the requirement that a legally-recognized religion must have over 22,000 members.

== See also ==
- Baháʼí Faith by country
- Baháʼí Faith in Niger
- Baháʼí Faith in Turkmenistan
- Baháʼí Faith in Uganda
- Iran Human Rights Documentation Center
- Mona Mahmudnizhad
- Iranian Taboo, a documentary film
- Political objections to the Baháʼí Faith
- National Spiritual Assembly of the Baháʼís of Iran
