= Heiner Bielefeldt =

German philosopher and historian (born 1958)

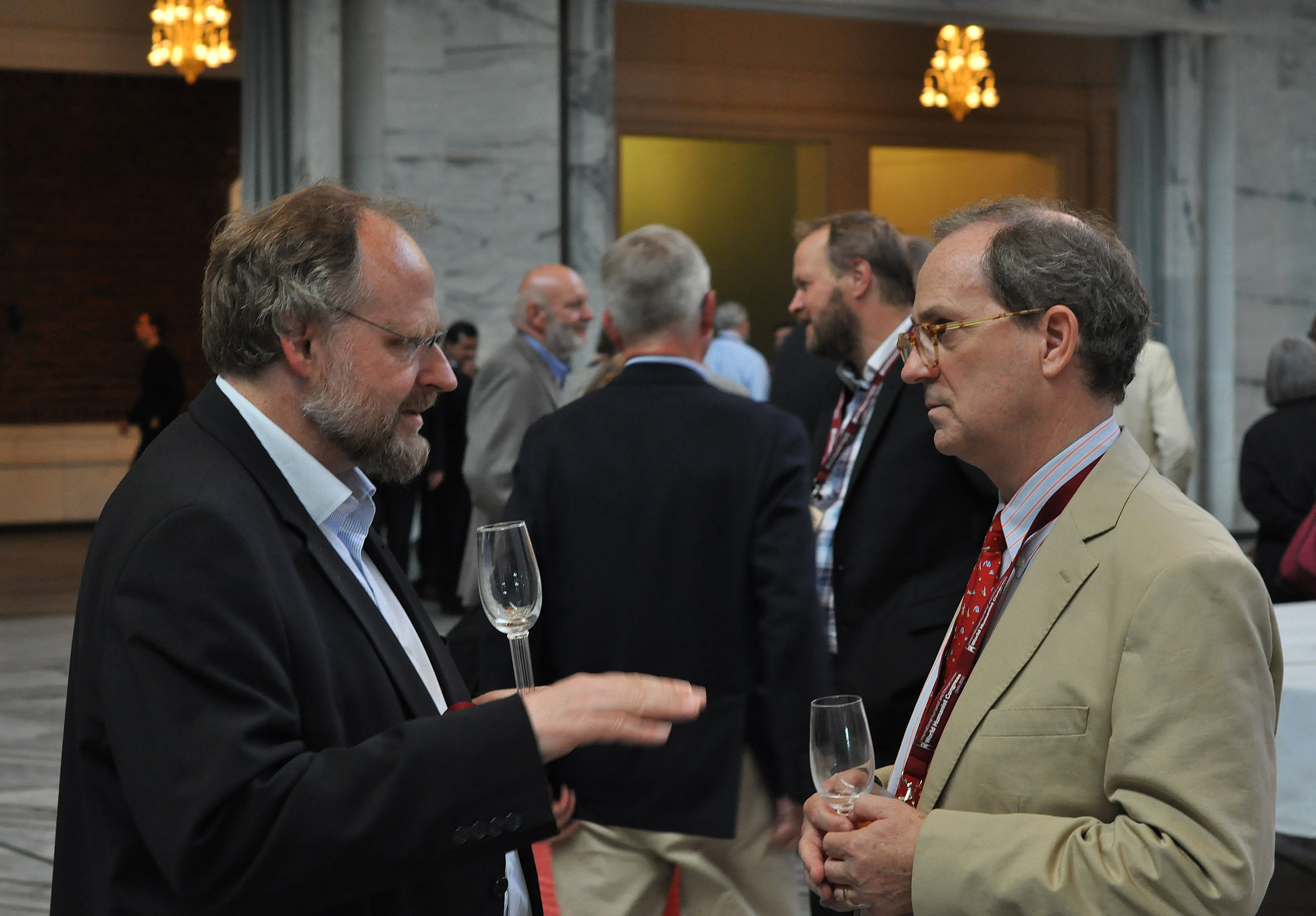
- Heiner Bielefeldt is on the left.
- Born: 12 April 1958 (age 68); Opherten

Heiner Bielefeldt (born 12 April 1958) is a German philosopher, historian and Catholic theologian. He is Professor of Human Rights and Human Rights Policy at the University of Erlangen. From 2010 to 2016, he served as United Nations Special Rapporteur on Freedom of Religion or Belief.

== Life ==
Bielefeldt studied philosophy and Catholic Theology at University of Bonn und University of Tübingen, which he completed in 1981 and 1982 respectively. Afterwards, he took a third undergraduate degree in history from University of Tübingen in 1988. In 1989 he received his PhD in Philosophy from the University of Tübingen with a thesis on social contract theories.

He then worked until 1995 at the Faculty of Law at the University of Heidelberg. As a recipient of an Alexander-von-Humboldt Fellowship, he spent 1993/94 at the Faculty of Law and the Department of Philosophy of the University of Toronto. In February 2000, he took his post-doctoral habilitation degree in philosophy from the University of Bremen.

From 2003 to 2009, Bielefeldt served as Director of the German Institute for Human Rights, which monitors the human rights situation inside Germany.

In 2009, Bielefeldt was appointed professor in the newly created Chair of Human Rights and Human Rights Policy at the University of Erlangen. Bielefeldt teaches in the areas of political science, philosophy, law and history.

Between 18 June 2010 and 31 October 2016 Bielefeldt was the appointed United Nations Special Rapporteur on Freedom of Religion or Belief by UN Secretary General Ban Ki-moon.

In 2018 Bielefeldt and his co-authors, Nazila Ghanea and Michael Wiener, where given the inaugural (Senior) Alberigo Award for their 2016 work,Freedom of Religion or Belief: An International Law Commentary.

== Other activities ==
- Commonwealth Initiative for Freedom of Religion or Belief (CIFoRB), Member of the Advisory Board
- German Commission for Justice and Peace, Member
- Migration Law Network at the Academy of the Roman Catholic Diocese of Rottenburg-Stuttgart, Member of the Advisory Board
- Hirschfeld Eddy Foundation, Member of the Board of Trustees
- Theological Ethics program at the University of Bamberg, Member of the Scientific Advisory Board
- Zeitschrift für Menschenrechte (Journal for Human Rights), Member of the Editorial Board
- Federal Anti-Discrimination Agency (ADS), Member of the Advisory Board (2010–2013)

== Works ==
- Christians and Muslims Facing the Challenge of Human Rights. J.P. Bachem, Bonn 1994.
- Neuzeitliches Freiheitsrecht und politische Gerechtigkeit. Perspektiven der Gesellschaftsvertragstheorien. Königshausen & Neumann, Würzburg 1990.
- Zum Ethos der menschenrechtlichen Demokratie. Eine Einführung am Beispiel des Grundgesetzes. Königshausen & Neumann, Würzburg 1991.
- Wiedergewinnung des Politischen. Eine Einführung in Hannah Arendts politisches Denken. Königshausen & Neumann, Würzburg 1993.
- Kampf und Entscheidung. Politischer Existentialismus bei Carl Schmitt, Helmuth Plessner und Karl Jaspers. Königshausen & Neumann, Würzburg 1994.
- Philosophie der Menschenrechte. Grundlagen eines weltweiten Freiheitsethos. Wissenschaftliche Buchgesellschaft Darmstadt und Primus, 1998.
  Portugiesische Übersetzung: Filosofia dos direitos humanos. Fundamentos de um ethos de liberdade universal. Editora Unisinos, Sao Leopoldo 2000.
- Kants Symbolik. Ein Schlüssel zur kritischen Freiheitsphilosophie. Alber, Freiburg i.Br. 2001. (Reihe Praktische Philosophie. Band 69).
  Englische Fassung: Symbolic Representation in Kant's Practical Philosophy. Cambridge University Press, Cambridge 2003.
- Muslime im säkularen Rechtsstaat. Integrationschancen durch Religionsfreiheit. transcript, Bielefeld 2003.
- Menschenrechte in der Einwanderungsgesellschaft. Plädoyer für einen aufgeklärten Multikulturalismus. transcript, Bielefeld 2007.
- Auslaufmodell Menschenwürde? Warum sie in Frage steht und warum wir sie verteidigen müssen, Herder Verlag, Freiburg 2011, ISBN 978-3-451-32508-3.
