= Ahmed Shaheed =

Maldivian diplomat and UN Special Rapporteur (born 1964)

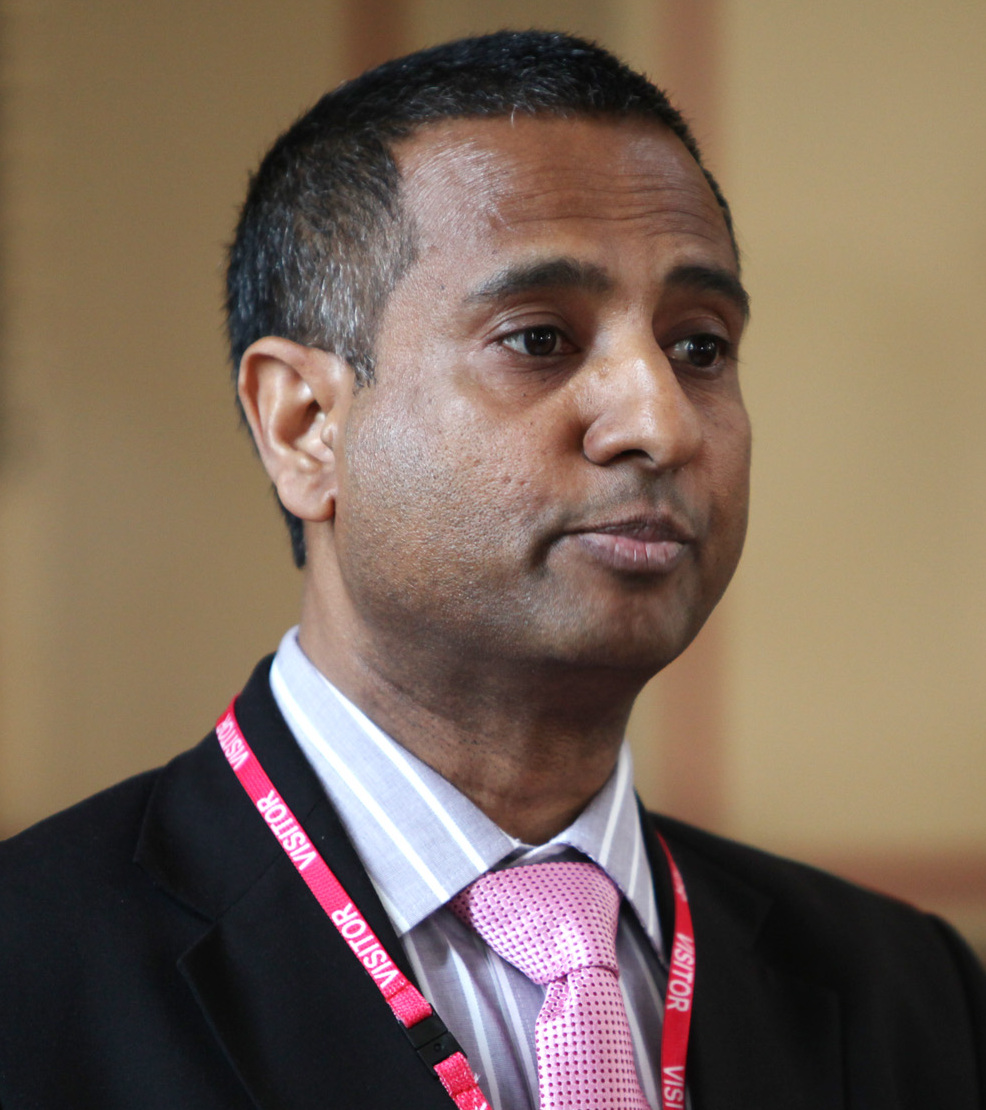
- Ahmed Shaheed in 2013

United Nations Special Rapporteur for Human Rights in Iran
- In office 17 June 2011 – 1 November 2016
- Preceded by: Vacant (last held by Maurice Copithorne)
- Succeeded by: Asma Jahangir

Minister for Foreign Affairs of Maldives
- In office 12 November 2008 – 10 December 2010 ^{1}
- President: Mohamed Nasheed
- Preceded by: Abdulla Shahid
- Succeeded by: Ahmed Naseem
- In office 14 July 2005 – 21 August 2007
- President: Maumoon Abdul Gayoom
- Preceded by: Fathulla Jameel
- Succeeded by: Abdulla Shahid

Personal details
- Born: 27 January 1964 (age 62)
- Party: Maldives Democratic Party
- Education: University of Aberystwyth (BSc); University of Queensland (Ph.D., IR; thesis: Microstates and Room for Diplomatic Manoeuvre)
- Resigned from office on 24 June 2010 during the en-masse cabinet resignation. Reinstated on 7 July 2010.

Ahmed Shaheed (Dhivehi: ޝަހީދު, born January 27, 1964) is a Maldivian diplomat, politician and professor. On 24 March 2016, he was appointed for the sixth year running as the United Nations Special Rapporteur on the human rights situation in the Islamic Republic of Iran. Shaheed is also the Chairperson of the Geneva-based international human rights think-tank, Universal Rights Group, which was launched in January 2014. He now lives in England as a Professor of Human Rights Practice at the University of Essex. Shaheed is also a Senior Fellow at Raoul Wallenberg Centre for Human Rights and a Fellow at the Bonavero Institute of Human rights at the University of Oxford.

Prior to his appointment as a UN envoy with the rank of Assistant Secretary General, he was a Maldivian politician and human rights defender. He served as Maldivian Minister of Foreign Affairs from November 2008 to December 2010; previously, he had served as Minister of Foreign Affairs for two years, from 14 July 2005 until August 20, 2007.

In March 2014, while he was United Nations Special Rapporteur on Human Rights in Iran, the Islamic Republic of Iran refused him entry to the country and declared him to be an agent of both the CIA and Israel.

On 13 June 2016, Shaheed was nominated by the Consultative Group of Ambassadors comprising Albania, Brazil, Egypt, France and Thailand, as the most suitable candidate to be appointed by the President of the Human Rights Council for the post of United Nations Special Rapporteur on Freedom of Religion or Belief, to succeed Professor Heiner Bielefeldt of Germany.

== Political and diplomatic career ==
A career diplomat since 1982, Shaheed served as the Permanent Secretary at the Ministry of Foreign Affairs of Maldives from 1998 to 2004. As Permanent Secretary of Maldives, he actively lobbied to widen and deepen regional cooperation within South Asia, incorporating discussions on human rights, regional peace, and free trade into the agenda of the South Asian Association of Regional Cooperation, including the pursuit of a South Asian Social Charter. Before his appointment as Permanent Secretary, he had served from 1997 to 1998 as a member of the Group of South Asian Eminent Persons, appointed by the Heads of State of the South Asian region. At the national level, in 2003, Shaheed also secured political approval for the creation of Maldives National Human Rights Commission, which was established in November 2003, and for accession to the UN Convention against Torture, as part of the human rights-related reforms the government embarked on in late 2003.

At the end of 2003, Shaheed retired from the diplomatic service and took up a position in the President's Office mandated to formulate and coordinate political and human rights reform and government communications following outbreaks of civil unrest in the capital and nearby areas.

In July 2005, Shaheed used his position as Government Spokesperson to reject the condemnation of the Universal Declaration of Human Rights by the Chief Justice of the Maldives. The Opposition MDP accused him of being the chief "spin doctor" for President Maumoon Abdul Gayoom while independent human rights NGOs such as Hama Jamiyya hail him as a champion of human rights.

He is one of the co-founders of New Maldives, a group within the former regime that spearheaded the drive to make the Maldives a modern liberal democracy. With his cabinet colleague Hassan Saeed, Shaheed is the author of the Roadmap for Reform, unveiled on 27 March 2006, identifying a raft of political and legal reforms with specific timeframes. Shaheed is also the founder of the Open Society Association dedicated to the promotion of human rights, tolerance, and democracy.

Although a very high-profile sponsor of the DRP, he was defeated in his bid to win the Vice Presidency of the Party in April 2006.

After resigning from the Cabinet, Shaheed and Saeed claimed to have faced intimidation and harassment as they actively lobbied against the regime, including by contesting in the presidential elections, with duo missing on the run-off by finishing third in the first round of elections. Their campaigning against the Gayoom regime was instrumental in forcing a free and fair election. Shaheed offered "unconditional support" for the candidature of the opposition candidate, Mohamed Nasheed, in the run-off, and was appointed as his Foreign Minister when the latter won the presidency in October 2008.

=== Human rights advocacy ===
While inaugurating a workshop conducted by the United Nations Office of the High Commissioner for Human Rights in March 2007, Shaheed took credit for all the steps taken by the Maldives to subscribe to the core international human rights treaties, including treaties that allowed Maldivians to petition the UN treaty bodies. He also claimed credit for the establishment of the Maldives Human Rights Commission by the Paris Principles. Shaheed had come under strident criticism for his advocacy of international human rights norms, such as extending standing invitations to United Nations Human Rights special mandates to visit Maldives and hosting of a UN Human Rights Advisor in Maldives. Shaheed's advocacy of an open society and strong anti-corruption measures were vehemently opposed by the President's brother, Abdulla Yameen and his supporters who mounted a series of motions of censure against Shaheed in parliament July–August 2007.

=== Resignation ===
On August 21, 2007, Shaheed resigned as Foreign Minister ahead of a second due motion of no-confidence against him tabled in the Majlis, which followed criticism of the Majlis by Shaheed, who said that it had failed the people. Shaheed said that "a conservative guard within the parliament and cabinet" was resisting reform.

His resignation followed his open criticism of the parliament for having failed to protect the people's fundamental rights and for being a rubber stamp to sustain the 30-year-old rule of President Gayoom. In his resignation statement, he called on the President to step down voluntarily and expressed frustration over the slow pace of the reform program. Writing in 2012, well-known international human rights activist and Deputy Chairman of the UK Conservative Party's Human Rights Commission, Benedict Rogers had described Shaheed as "the lead reformer" in the Maldives.

=== Re-appointment ===
After Gayoom was defeated in the October 2008 presidential election, his successor, Mohamed Nasheed, reappointed Shaheed as Foreign Minister in November 2008. His second stint as Foreign Minister was no less controversial than the first, coming under fire from the parliament and radical Islamist parties for recognition of Kosovo as an independent State, the development of cooperation with Israel and the participation in the US programme to close down Guantanamo Bay detention facility by agreeing to relocate persons released from Gitmo. An advocate of close security ties with India, he was also widely criticized by pro-Pakistani Islamist elements. As Foreign Minister, Shaheed had also agreed to a moratorium on corporal punishment, including flogging, and to protect LGBT community in Maldives against discrimination, during the universal periodic review of Maldives held in Geneva on 3 November 2010. Amnesty International's Annual Report in 2011 described Shaheed as the "leading human rights defender" in the Maldives.

=== International career ===
In May 2010, Maldives was elected to the UN Human Rights Council, securing the highest number of votes ever gained by a country. Earlier, from 1997 to 1998, Shaheed had served as a member of the Group of Eminent Persons mandated by the leaders of the South Asian Association for Regional Cooperation, comprising Afghanistan, Bhutan, India, Maldives, Nepal, Pakistan and Sri Lanka, while from 2009 to 2010 he served on the Commonwealth Ministerial Action Group mandated to oversee the protection of democratic values and human rights in the 54 member association of former British colonies.

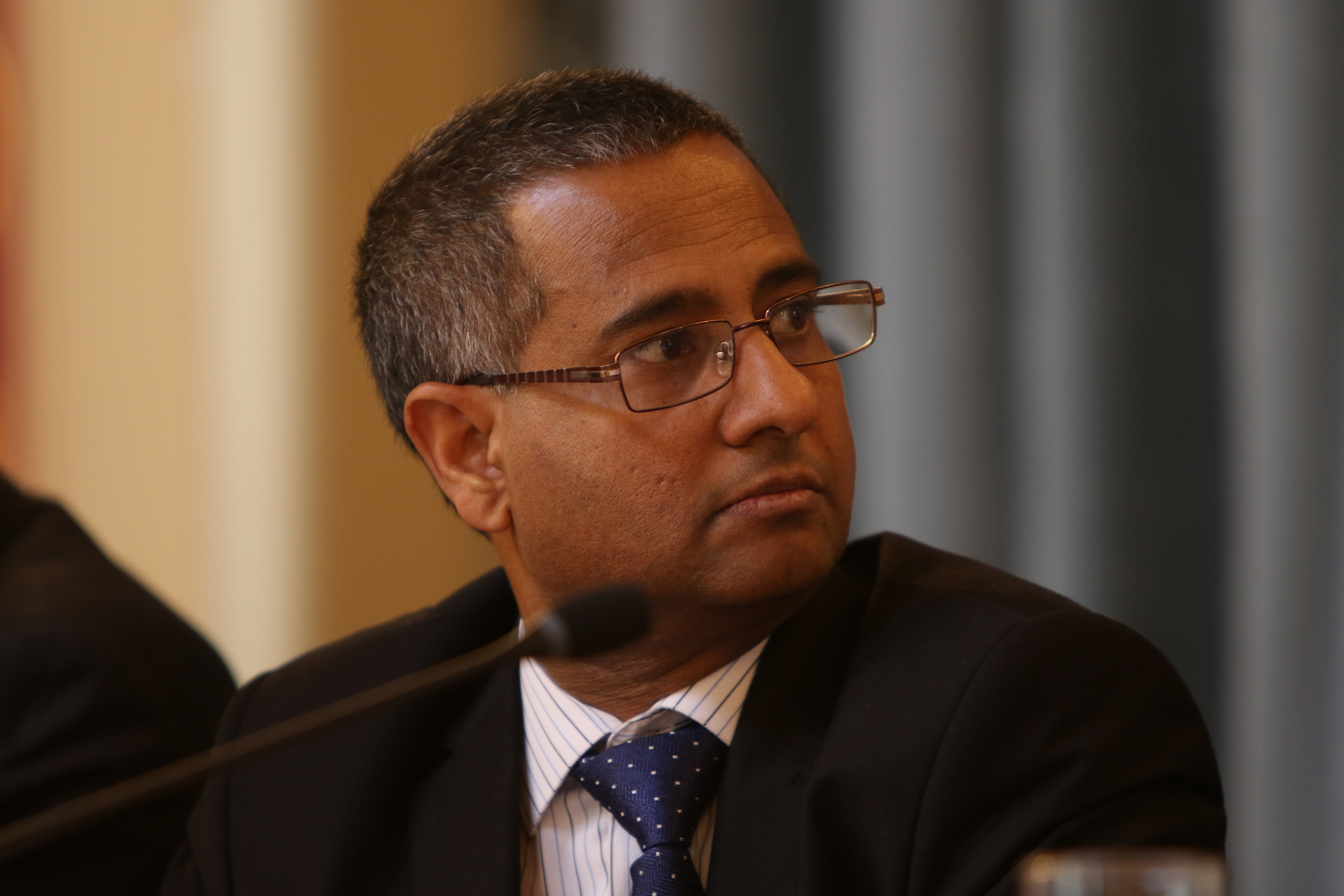
Shaheed speaks at a summit on freedom of religion held at the Foreign & Commonwealth Office in London on October 20, 2016.

On June 17, 2011, Shaheed was appointed as special rapporteur on the Human Rights Situation in Iran by the Human Rights Council of the United Nations. However, for the first time since 2011, the Maldives, with Abdulla Yameen as president, refused to back Shaheed's re-appointment in 2014 as UN envoy, despite public appeals from Iranian civil society. From 2010 to 2012, Shaheed had been the lead investigator of an alleged 800 million dollar fraud by current President Yameen, filing court cases in Singapore High Court through the UK fraud investigator Grant Thornton and Singapore solicitors Rajah and Tan. In September 2013, he stirred considerable animosity from President Yameen when he called for international intervention to facilitate presidential elections when the first round was nullified by the Supreme Court of Maldives. On 23 March 2016, the Human Rights Council voted to extend Shaheed's UN mandate to investigate human rights abuses in the Islamic Republic of Iran for a 6th year, again without the support of his country, the Maldives. The Maldives' failure to support Shaheed this time was explained by a leading government MP as based on his opposition to the re-introduction of the death penalty in the Maldives after a 63-year-old moratorium.

Living in self-imposed exile since the coup d'état of February 2012, Shaheed has been a vociferous campaigner for the restoration of democracy and for the advancement of human rights in Maldives. He has also been active on the international stage advocating human rights protection in Islamic societies, supporting freedom of religion and the abolition of the death penalty. The official newspaper of the Islamist party in Maldives declared in February that Shaheed was the foremost apostate in Maldives. In April 2013, Shaheed was a Guest of Honour at the launch of the UK Foreign and Commonwealth Office's 2012 Human Rights and Democracy Report.

In September 2012, Shaheed joined the Human Rights Centre at the University of Essex as a visiting professor. He teaches human rights, Islam and diplomacy. He is also a visiting professor at the City University of New York.

In August 2015, The Guardian reported Iran uses fabricated WikiLeaks cable to smear UN rights rapporteur. It said "Iranian articles claimed that the Saudi embassy in Kuwait had paid the UN envoy $1m to take an anti-Iran position.

=== Awards and honors ===
On 5 May 2009, the Washington-based think-tank Centre for the Study of Islam and Democracy conferred their annual Muslim Democrat of the Year Award to Shaheed. The citation for the award read that it was being given to Shaheed in recognition of his "role in building democracy and preserving it in the face of hardship, for promoting tolerance and harmony, and for opening a window into a century of reason, freedom, human rights and democracy in the Maldives and in South Asia."

On 4 November 2010, the President of Albania awarded him the Presidential Medal of Gratitude for his contribution to promoting peace in the Balkans.

On 3 November 2015, Shaheed, along with then UN Secretary-General Ban Ki-Moon was a recipient of the Global Leadership Awards for advancing human rights. As the recipient of the prestigious Leo Nevas Human Rights Award, Shaheed's citation reads:

For a lifetime of achievement effectively advancing human rights in his own country and abroad, through citizen action, governmental support for that action, and through the United Nations. For his courage and conviction and his steadfast support for human rights for all.

== Personal life ==
Shaheed was educated at the University of Aberystwyth, UK, before he obtained his Ph.D. in International Relations at the University of Queensland, Australia. He now lives in England as a Professor of Human Rights Practice at the University of Essex.

== See also ==
- Foreign relations of the Maldives
- Politics of Maldives
