= Quenching the Light =

2008 documentary by Mithaq Kazimi

Quenching The Light (2008) is a PSA-like documentary short film that highlights the persecution of Baháʼís in Iran.

== Production ==
The nine-minute documentary was produced by Mithaq Kazimi and features artist Mahmehr Golestaneh's paintings of some of the martyrs of the Baháʼí Faith since 1978, mixed with live video footage of the descendants of the martyrs. The score is composed by Christopher Tressler and Larry Robinson. It was the first documentary to address the arrests of the Baháʼí 7, which occurred from 5 March to 14 May 2008.

On the internet, the documentary was first released on Google video and then later on YouTube.

== Response ==
When first uploaded, the video was "flagged" by unknown sources and removed by YouTube. A few months later, in September 2008, KDK Factory was able to open another account and upload the video.

== See also ==
- Iranian Taboo (2011)
- Education Under Fire (2011)
- To Light a Candle (2014)
