= Statements about the persecution of Baháʼís =

Members of the Baháʼí Faith have been persecuted in various countries, especially in Iran, the location of one of the largest Baháʼí populations in the world. The Baháʼí Faith originated in Iran, and represents the largest religious minority in that country. Since the later part of the 20th century many third party organizations such as the United Nations, Amnesty International, the European Union, and the United States have made statements denouncing the persecution of Baháʼís asking that human rights be maintained. Members of the Baháʼí community in Iran have been subjected to unwarranted arrests, false imprisonment, beatings, torture, unjustified executions, confiscation and destruction of property owned by individuals and the Baháʼí community, denial of employment, denial of government benefits, denial of civil rights and liberties, and denial of access to higher education.

== General ==
=== United Nations ===
United Nations

The United Nations and the United Nations Commission on Human Rights has published reports on the persecution of the Baháʼís since the Iranian Revolution in 1979; in every year since 1984, except for 2002, the United Nations Commission on Human Rights has passed a resolution expressing concern about human rights violations against the Baháʼís in Iran. The Special Representative on Iran, Professor Galindo Pohl, Canadian Jurist and UBC Law Professor, Maurice Copithorne, and the Special Rapporteur on Religious Intolerance, Professor Abdu'l Fatah Amor, have all reported on the persecutions that the Baháʼís have faced in Iran. Throughout the years the Commission has written:

- 1995: "... the Baháʼís, whose existence as a viable religious community in the Islamic Republic of Iran is threatened ..."
- 1997: "... the grave breaches of the human rights of the Baháʼís in the Islamic Republic of Iran ..."
- 1999: "... the unabated and, in some instances, worsened pattern of persecution against the Baháʼís, including death sentences, executions, arrests and the closure of the Baháʼí Institute for Higher Education ..."
- 2000: "... unabated pattern of persecution against the Baháʼís ..."
- 2001: "... its concern at the still-existing discrimination against persons belonging to minorities, in particular against Baháʼís ..."
- 2004: "... the Committee has noted discriminatory practices against the members of the Baháʼí[sic] in education [and] the Government provides no new information on the situation of the Baháʼí[sic] in terms of access to university and institutes of higher learning ..."
- January 2004: "The situation of the Baháʼís is also a cause of concern for the Special Rapporteur. Members of the Baháʼí community are barred from expressing themselves as Baháʼí. The Baháʼí community are routinely harassed, arrested and sometimes sentenced to long periods of imprisonment either for apostasy or association with Baháʼís institutions"
- March 2005: "... individuals in the city of Babul began to destroy a property with great religious significance to the Baháʼí community worldwide ... . Despite attempts to protect the site, it was reported that the demolition of the rest of the structure had continued gradually and quietly, in a manner designed not to attract attention. ... the reported discrimination faced by certain minorities, including the Baháʼís, who are deprived of certain rights ... appear to be discriminatory on both ethnic and religious grounds."
- March 2005: "... it continues to be concerned at reports that these minorities, in particular the Baháʼí minority, are subjected to harassment, intimidation and imprisonment on account of their religious beliefs"
- July 2005: "Information collected by the Special Rapporteur seems to indicate the existence of a number of cases of confiscation of Baháʼí property ..."
- November 2005: "... the escalation and increased frequency of discrimination and other human rights violations against the Baháʼí[sic], including cases of arbitrary arrest and detention, the denial of freedom of religion or of publicly carrying out communal affairs, the disregard of property rights, the destruction of sites of religious importance, the suspension of social, educational and community-related activities and the denial of access to higher education, employment, pensions, adequate housing and other benefits ...". The United Nations "calls upon the Government of the Islamic Republic of Iran ... to ensure equality before the law and the equal protection of the law without any discrimination in all instances, including for members of religious, ethnic, linguistic or other minority groups, officially recognized or otherwise ... . To eliminate, in law or in practice, all forms of discrimination based on religious, ethnic or linguistic grounds, and other human rights violations against persons belonging to minorities, including Arabs, Kurds, Baluchi, Christians, Jews, Sunni Muslims and the Baháʼí[sic], and to address this matter in an open manner, with the full participation of the minorities themselves, to otherwise ensure full respect for the right to freedom of thought, conscience, religion or belief of all persons, and to implement the 1996 report of the Special Rapporteur of the Commission on Human Rights on religious intolerance, which recommended ways the Islamic Republic of Iran could emancipate the Baháʼí[sic] community."

=== Amnesty International ===
Amnesty International has also documented the persecution of the Baháʼí community in Iran. It has written:

- 1993: "Serious human rights violations persist in Iran. Real or imagined political opponents are targeted, along with religious minorities such as Baháʼís"
- 1996: "At least 201 have been executed, most during the 1980s and apparently in connection with their religious beliefs. Baháʼís are not permitted to meet, to hold religious ceremonies or to practice their religion communally. Baháʼí buildings, sites and centres have been confiscated and closed; private and business property of individual Baháʼís has been confiscated, and Baháʼís have been dismissed from government posts and schools"
- 1998: "Amnesty International unreservedly condemns the execution of Ruhullah Rouhani and fears that he was executed for the non violent expression of his beliefs. Amnesty International currently knows of seven cases of Baháʼí prisoners under the sentence of death and is calling for commutation of these and all other death sentences without delay"

=== European Union ===
European Union

The European Union in the 2004 EU Annual Report on Human Rights wrote:

There has not been discernible progress in the key areas of concern. Concern was also reiterated at the destruction of the Baháʼí holy site at Babol and the refusal of the authorities to allow the dignified re-interment of the remains it contains.

Then in a speech given at the European Parliament in October 2005 on behalf of the European Commissioner for Education, Training, Culture and Multilingualism, Jan Figel said:

Regarding the actual situation of human rights in Iran, there is a growing cause for concern. There are other serious issues of concern which have emerged recently: ... the arrest of members of the Baháʼí Faith.

=== United States government ===
The United States Department of State Bureau of Democracy, Human Rights and Labor stated in the 2004 Report on International Religious Freedom that:

- "The Government harasses the Baháʼí community by arresting Baháʼís arbitrarily"
- "The property rights of Baháʼís are generally disregarded, ... the Government has confiscated large numbers of private and business properties belonging to Baháʼís"
- "Public and private universities continue to deny admittance to Baháʼí students"
- "... official Baháʼí schools are not allowed ..."

In 2008, the United States House of Representatives passes HR. RES. 1008, condemning the persecution of Baha'is in Iran.

=== Iranian government ===
The Iranian government claims that Baháʼís are enemies of the state, were supporters of the former Shah's government and spies employed by imperialist governments of the West. The Ayatollah Khomeini, even before his return to Iran said in an interview that he believed that Baháʼís were traitors — Zionists — and enemies of Islam.

The Iranian representative to the United Nations tried several times, albeit unsuccessfully, between 1982 and 1984 to convince the United Nations diplomatic community that the Baháʼí Faith is a politicized organization with a record of criminal activism against the Iranian government and not a legitimate religion like Judaism, Christianity, and Zoroastrianism which are protected under Iranian law; Iran has not acknowledged that the Baháʼí Faith is a religion.

=== Iranian writers and academics ===
The general belief among the Iranian people follows the statements of the Iranian government that Baháʼís are enemies of the state, and supporters of the previous government of the Shah:

The real truth is though that no one gives a damn what happens to Baháʼís.

— Iqbal Latif, The Iranian August 5, 2002

I'm just fascinated by the fact that we -- nearly every non-Baháʼí Iranian -- do not really consider Baháʼís as Iranian. We consider them bastard children of British colonialism aiming to destroy Islam, specifically Shiʻite Islam. They're not even 'other' Iranians. We see them as something else. Or maybe we don't see them at all.

— Jahanshah Javid, The Iranian July 3, 2002

Still than being celebrated for their contribution and evolution of Iranian thought or even engaged in debates about the validity of their beliefs, Baháʼís are considered to have suspect allegiances, foreign imperialists and 'Zionist agents'.

— Jahanshah Javid, The Iranian July 3, 2002

The popular notion among Iranian Muslims and other non-Muslims is that the Baháʼís enjoyed a privileged status during the reign of Mohammad Reza Shah.

— Professor Sanasarian,

There are many Iranians who have published how and why Iranians think of Baháʼís as outsiders. Dr. Mohammad Tavakoli, a Muslim-Iranian, who is a Professor of Middle Eastern Studies at the University of Toronto presents in Iran-Nameh, a Persian language academic journal, a study that examines the processes that led to the ghettoization and eventual "othering" of the Baháʼís in Iran by the political and religious forces within Iranian society. Other statements include:

It is this eventuality that we all should assume responsibility for and to avert this; Iranians must accept that Baháʼís are an integral and loyal community within Iran, extending the same inclusiveness reserved for Shiʻites and other minorities.

— Iqbal Latif, The Iranian August 5, 2002

Go ahead. Go and shed a tear for Palestinians. They deserve it. Israel is crushing them like ants. But when you get a chance, do give a shit about Baháʼís too. You want a noble cause? You want to scream and shout about injustice? I'm telling you... Baháʼís have been really underrated as far as causes go.

— Jahanshah Javid, The Iranian July 3, 2002

On July 15, 2013, Mohammad Nourizad kissed the feet of a 4-year-old Baháʼí boy whose parents had been arrested for participation in the Baháʼí Institute for Higher Education saying: "…why shouldn't I kiss your feet as a representative of the office of [Iran's Supreme Leader Ayatollah Ali Khamenei] and the [many] Shiʻite sources of emulation?" and published the event on his blog. The boy's father responded in a letter from prison dated July 18 saying in part: "Mr. Nourizad! You asked Artin to slap you and to spit on you. I heard this request as your attempt to ease his pain, and the utmost sign of your honesty and your acceptance of responsibility. At the same time, I wish that no human body should have to be exposed to such a thing, as the body houses the human spirit and the human spirit is a display of the Divine one."

=== Response from the United Nations ===
The United Nations responded to the Iranian government's accusations by stating that there has been no evidence of Iran's claims and that the Baháʼí community in Iran professes its allegiance to the state. The United Nations pointed to the Baháʼí teaching of obedience to the government of one's country and stated that any involvement in any subversive acts against the government would be antithetical to precepts of the Baháʼí religion. The United Nations also stated that if the Iranian government did acknowledge that the Baháʼí Faith is a religion, it would be an admission that freedom of religion does not apply to all in Iran and that it is not abiding by the Universal Declaration of Human Rights and International Covenants on Human Rights to which it is a signatory.

=== Response from prominent figures ===
Many well-known personalities have also raised their voices about the issue. Some include Rainn Wilson's CNN article, KC Porter's Yaran song, Mithaq Kazimi's Quenching The Light video and Jack Lenz's Freedom to Believe Foundation.

== Arrest of Baháʼí leaders in 2008 ==
There have been widespread calls from public figures, governments and organizations to the Iranian government to release the Baháʼís, especially after the trial was announced on February 11, 2009. Many Brazilian members of government have spoken out for the Baháʼís as early as April 2008. (Note: They include Luiz Couto - 13 March, 3 July, 8 October, Fernando Ferro - 08 April, Boy Alencar - 13 August, Bullet Rocha - 13 August, Geraldo Resende - 16 October, Pompeo de Mattos, and Carlos Abicalil.) From the United States, representative Frank R. Wolf stated he was deeply disturbed about the systematic persecution of the Baháʼís witnessed through the announced trial. Later congressman Mark Kirk of Illinois offered a resolution on the subject of the trial condemning the government of Iran for its state-sponsored persecution of its Baháʼí minority; the resolution was co-sponsored by other Representatives. (Note: The resolution brought up during the 111th Congress in H. RES. 175 - "Condemning the Government of Iran for its state-sponsored persecution of its Baha'i minority and its continued violation of the International Covenants on Human Rights" which was referred to the Committee on Foreign Affairs, was initially co-sponsored by representatives James McGovern, Massachusetts; Brad Sherman, California; Dan Burton, Indiana; Bill Foster, Illinois; Maurice Hinchey, New York; Frank Wolf, Virginia; and Jim Moran, Virginia by Feb 13th. By March the number of co-sponsors has reached 28 congressmen.) A Senatorial resolution has been introduced by Senator Ron Wyden of Oregon, cosponsored by Sam Brownback, Kansas; Robert Menendez, New Jersey; Olympia Snowe, Maine; and Sheldon Whitehouse, Rhode Island. In Canada, Deepak Obhrai, Canadian Parliamentary Secretary to the Minister of Foreign Affairs, found the announcement of the trial very troubling, which was echoed by Lawrence Cannon, Canadian Minister of Foreign Affairs. In Germany, German chairman of the CSU Group in the Bundestag, Peter Ramsauer stated that he had "deep concern". In the United Kingdom, British Foreign Office Minister Bill Rammell also expressed concern over the trial. The Presidency of the European Union (EU), with the support of the EU associated countries denounced the trial, (Note: EU associated countries supporting the statement include Turkey, Croatia, Macedonia, Albania, Montenegro, Iceland, Liechtenstein, Norway, Ukraine and Moldova.) which was echoed by the President of the European Parliament. In Australia, the Australian Department of Foreign Affairs and Trade spoke to the subject, as did Mark Weitzman, director of the Simon Wiesenthal Center's Task Force Against Hate. In the Netherlands, Dutch Minister of Foreign Affairs Maxime Verhagen said the Netherlands was seriously concerned, fears that the trial will not be fair and has asked for an independent observer. The Canadian Parliamentary Sub-Committee on Human Rights has adopted a strongly worded motion February 24 which was forwarded to the full committee on the 26th. On the same day the UK Board of Deputies president, Henry Grunwald QC, has written to Foreign Secretary David Miliband with a renewed call to the government to support the persecuted Baháʼí community in Iran. Repeating steps taken in 2006 following the UN Special Rapporteur for Freedom of Religion reports of the time, in April 2009 the Foreign Affairs Committee of the Lower House of the Spanish Congress of Deputies unanimously approved a resolution concerning the "systematic" persecution being exerted on the Baháʼí community. In May 2009 a motion from the Australian House of Representatives expressed "serious concern" there was no access to legal representation or due legal process, that charges of "spying, insulting religious sanctities, and propaganda against the Islamic Republic, and that these charges could attract the death penalty". The Representatives rose in motion calling on Iran "to respect rights to freedom of religion and the peaceful exercise of freedom of expression and association, in accordance with international human rights conventions" and "to release the seven Baha'i detainees without delay." Six members of Parliament from both major parties spoke in support of the motion: Leichhardt Turnour, Cowan Simpkins, Hindmarsh Georganas, O'Connor Turckey, Isaacs Dreyfus, and Longman Sullivan. Members of the German Bundestag, partisan speakers Erika Steinbach MP (CDU/CSU), Christoph Strässer MP (SPD), Volker Beck MP (B90/DIE GRÜNEN) and chairman Burkhardt Müller-Sönksen MdB (FDP) united in issuing a joint declaration demanding "the immediate and unconditional release of the leaders of the Baha'i religious community."

Human rights organizations have also released statements: Amnesty International released updated Action Alerts about the trial in 2009 in February, and again in July, Freedom House strongly condemned the trial, and World Organisation Against Torture proposed actions to secure the freedom of the leadership and others arrested. Responding to a letter from Roxana Saberi, who was in contact with two of the women Baháʼí leaders while she was in prison, the United States Commission on International Religious Freedom demanded the seven prisoners be freed rather than stand trial.

There have been groups of individuals also speaking out. On February 4, 2009 267 non-Baháʼí Iranian academics, writers, artists, journalists and activists from some 21 countries including Iran signed an open letter of apology posted to Iranian.com and stating that they believed that the Baháʼís had been deprived of their rights in the Islamic Republic, and pledging their support of achieving the rights detailed in the Universal Declaration of Human Rights for the Baháʼís in Iran. (Note: Original signatories include Sheema Kalbasi, Mojtaba Saminejad, Nazanin Afshin-Jam, Shahrokh Moshkin Ghalam, Ahmad Batebi. Well over 100 more have added their signatures since including Daryoush Ashouri, and Faegheh Atashin.) Several prominent Indians, including leading jurists of India's legal system, journalists, and civil rights activists, have also signed an open letter urging Iran to abide by international human rights conventions and release the detainees immediately. (Note: Signatories of the July 19, 2008 letter include: former Chief Justice of India Justice Jagdish Sharan Verma, former Supreme Court judge Justice V.R. Krishna Iyer, former Chief Justice of Delhi High Court Justice Rajinder Sachar, former Attorney General Soli Sorabjee, member, Law commission, Tahir Mahmood, former chairperson, National Commission for Women, Mohini Giri, editorial director, Hindustan Times, Vir Sanghvi, senior columnist Kuldip Nayar, president, World Council for Arya Samaj, Swami Agnivesh.) British entertainers wrote an open letter printed in The Times of London of those to be on trial stating their solidarity with the Baháʼís." (Note: The British entertainers include David Baddiel, Bill Bailey, Morwenna Banks, Sanjeev Bhaskar, Jo Brand, Russell Brand, Rob Brydon, Jimmy Carr, Jack Dee, Omid Djalili, Sean Lock, Lee Mack, Alexei Sayle, Meera Syal, and Mark Thomas.) Rainn Wilson, an American actor, also published a commentary through CNN. A prominent group of more than sixty professors and scholars who specialize in Middle Eastern and Iranian Studies have added their voices in protest as well. (Note: The American Academics include Janet Afary, Ervand Abrahamian, Reza Afshari, Saïd Amir Arjomand, Fred Donner, John Esposito, Mehran Kamrava, Mehrangiz Kar, Ahmad Karimi-Hakkak, Farhad Kazemi, Denis MacEoin, Ann Elizabeth Mayer, David Morgan, Roy Mottahedeh, Kamran Talattof, among 66 signatories.) Cherie Blair, a British barrister and wife of Tony Blair, urged readers of The Times to keep aware of state persecution of Iran's Baháʼí religious minority, and urge the Iranian government to give these individuals a fair trial and allow independent observers access to ensure this happens. Speaking to a crowd of over 1,400 people packed into George Washington University's Lisner Auditorium on September 12, 2009 Dr. Azar Nafisi, best-selling author: Shohreh Aghdashloo, days before winning her 2009 Emmy; and Dr. Dwight Bashir, Associate Director for Policy at the United States Commission on International Religious Freedom, added their voices to those concerned about human rights in Iran and the persecution of Baháʼís in Iran. Aghdashloo's talk in particular was posted to YouTube.
