= Excursion =

Excursion may refer to:

== Science and technology ==
- Brownian excursion, a concept in the theory of stochastic processes
- Critical excursion, or criticality accident, a topic in nuclear physics
- Diaphragmatic excursion, the movement of the thoracic diaphragm during breathing
- Geomagnetic excursion, a change in the Earth's magnetic field
- Excursion (audio), the linear movement range of a speaker
- eXcursion, a Digital Equipment Corporation Pathworks X11 server for Windows

== Arts and entertainment ==
=== Music ===
- Excursion (album) a 1993 album by Ray Drummond
- Excursions (Eddie Harris album), 1973
- Excursions (Paul Murphy and Larry Willis album), 2008
- Excursions: Remixes & Rare Grooves, a 1995 album by the Brand New Heavies
- Excursions, a 2018 album by C418
- Excursions (Barber), a 1942 solo piano piece by Samuel Barber
- "Excursions", a 1991 song by A Tribe Called Quest from The Low End Theory

=== Other media ===
- The Excursion, an 1814 poem by William Wordsworth
- Excursions (anthology), an anthology of essays by Henry David Thoreau
- Excursion (film), a 2023 Bosnian-language film
- Excursions (film), a 2016 American film

== Other ==
- Ford Excursion, an SUV
- Grand Excursion, an 1854 American train journey, retraced in 2004
- Harvest excursion, a former agricultural practice in Canada
- Runway excursion, the unplanned exit of an aircraft from a runway

== See also ==
- Excursion train, a train chartered or specially available for an excursion
