= Ethion =

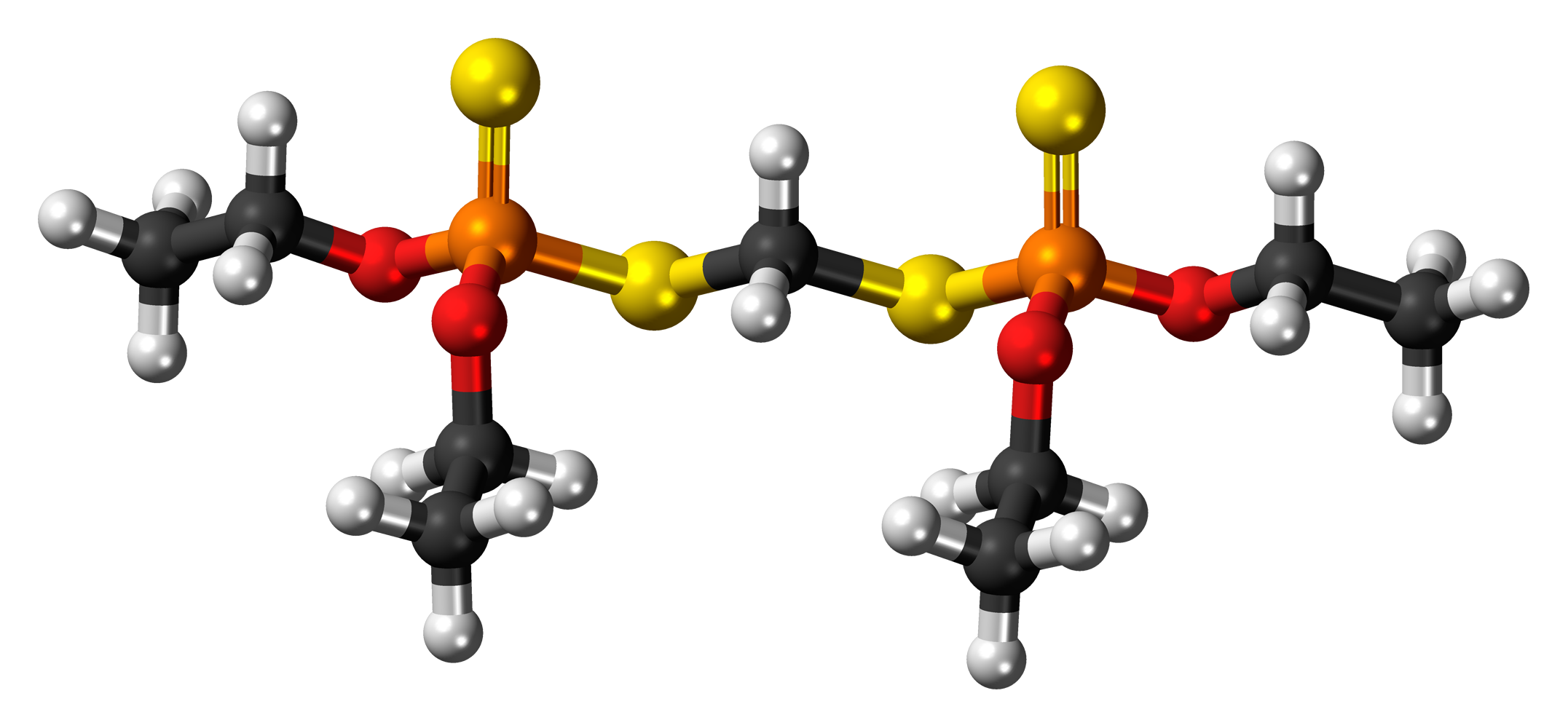

Names
- IUPAC name O,O,O′,O′-Tetraethyl S,S′-methylene bis(phosphorodithioate)
- Other names Diethion; Bis[S-(diethoxyphosphinothioyl)mercapto]methane;[(Diethoxyphosphinothioylthio)methylthio]-diethoxy-thioxophosphorane

Identifiers
CAS Number	563-12-2
3D model (JSmol)	Interactive image
ChEBI	CHEBI:38663
ChemSpider	3171
ECHA InfoCard	100.008.403
KEGG	C18725
PubChem CID	3286
UNII	2TI07NO12Y
CompTox Dashboard (EPA)	DTXSID2024086
- InChI: InChI=1S/C9H22O4P2S4/c1-5-10-14(16,11-6-2)18-9-19-15(17,12-7-3)13-8-4/h5-9H2,1-4H3 Key: RIZMRRKBZQXFOY-UHFFFAOYSA-N; InChI=1/C9H22O4P2S4/c1-5-10-14(16,11-6-2)18-9-19-15(17,12-7-3)13-8-4/h5-9H2,1-4H3 Key: RIZMRRKBZQXFOY-UHFFFAOYAJ
- SMILES: S=P(SCSP(=S)(OCC)OCC)(OCC)OCC

Properties
Chemical formula	C_{9}H_{22}O_{4}P_{2}S_{4}
Molar mass	384.48 g/mol
Appearance	Colorless to amber-colored, odorless liquid
Density	1.22 g/cm^{3}
Melting point	−12.2 °C (10.0 °F; 260.9 K)
Boiling point	150 °C (302 °F; 423 K) (decomposes)
Solubility in water	0.0001% (20 °C)
Vapor pressure	0.0000015 mmHg (20 °C)

Hazards
- Occupational safety and health (OHS/OSH)
Main hazards	Combustible
- GHS labelling
Pictograms	(GHS06: Toxic) (GHS07: Exclamation mark) (GHS08: Health hazard) (GHS09: Environmental hazard)
Signal word	Danger
NFPA 704 (fire diamond)	3 1 0
Flash point	176.1 °C (349.0 °F; 449.2 K)
- NIOSH (US health exposure limits)
PEL (Permissible)	none
REL (Recommended)	TWA 0.4 mg/m^{3} [skin]
IDLH (Immediate danger)	N.D.
- Except where otherwise noted, data are given for materials in their standard state (at 25 °C [77 °F], 100 kPa). verify (what is ?) Infobox references

Ethion (C_{9}H_{22}O_{4}P_{2}S_{4}) is an organophosphate insecticide. It is known to affect the neural enzyme acetylcholinesterase and disrupt its function.

== History ==
Ethion was first registered in the US as an insecticide in the 1950s. Annual usage of ethion since then has varied depending on overall crop yields and weather conditions. For example, 1999 was a very dry year; since the drought reduced yields, the use of ethion was less economically rewarding. Since 1998, risk assessment studies have been conducted by (among others) the EPA (United States Environmental Protection Agency). Risk assessments for ethion were presented at a July 14, 1999 briefing with stakeholders in Florida, which was followed by an opportunity for public comment on risk management for this pesticide.

== Regulatory review ==
Ethion was one of many substances approved for use based on data from Industrial Bio-Test Laboratories, which was later discovered to have engaged in extensive scientific misconduct and fraud, prompting the Food and Agriculture Organization and World Health Organization to recommend ethion's reanalysis in 1982.

== Synthesis ==
Ethion is produced under controlled pH conditions by reacting dibromomethane with Diethyl dithiophosphoric acid in ethanol. Other methods of synthesis include the reaction of methylene bromide and sodium diethyl phosphorodithioate or the reaction of diethyl dithiophosphoric acid and formaldehyde.

== Reactivity and mechanism ==
Ethion is a small lipophilic molecule. This promotes rapid passive absorption across cell membranes. Thus absorption through skin, lungs, and the gut into the blood occurs via passive diffusion. Ethion is metabolized in the liver via desulfurization, producing the metabolite ethion monoxon. This transformation leads to liver damage.

Ethion monoxon is an inhibitor of the neuroenzyme cholinesterase (ChE), which normally facilitates nerve impulse transmission; secondary damage thus occurs in the brain. Because the chemical structure of ethion monoxon is similar to that of an organophosphate, its mechanism of poisoning is thought to be the same. See the figure, "Inhibition of cholinesterase by ethion monoxon." The figure depicts enzyme inhibition as a two-step process. Here, a hydroxyl group (OH) from a serine residue in the active site of ChE is phosphorylated by an organophosphate, causing enzyme inhibition and preventing the serine hydroxyl group from participating in the hydrolysis of another enzyme called acetylcholinesterase (Ach). The phosphorylated form of the enzyme is highly stable, and depending on the R and R′ groups attached to phosphorus, this inhibition can be either reversible or irreversible.

== Metabolism ==
Goats exposed to ethion showed clear distinctions in excretion, absorption half-life and bioavailability. These differences depend on the method of administration. Intravenous injection resulted in a half-life time of 2 hours, while oral administration resulted in a half-life time of 10 hours. Dermal administration lead to a half-life time of 85 hours. These differences in half-life times can be correlated with differences in bio-availability. The bio-availability of ethion via oral administration was less than 5%, whereas the bio-availability via dermal administration of ethion was 20%.

In a study conducted among rats, it was found that ethion is readily metabolized after oral administration. Rat urine samples contained four to six polar water-soluble ethion metabolites.

A study among chickens revealed more about spontaneous ethion distribution in the body. In a representative study, liver, muscle, and fat tissues were examined after 10 days of ethion exposure. In all three cases, ethion or ethion derivatives were present, indicating that it is widely spread in the body. Chicken eggs were also investigated, and it was found that the egg white reaches a steady ethion derivative concentration after four days, while the concentration in yolk was still rising after ten days. In the investigated chickens, about six polar water-soluble metabolites were also found to be present.

In a study performed on goats, heart and kidney tissues were investigated after a period of ethion exposure, and in these tissues, ethion-derivatives were found. This study indicates that the highest levels were found in the liver and kidneys, and the lowest levels in fat. Derivatives were also detected in the goats' milk.

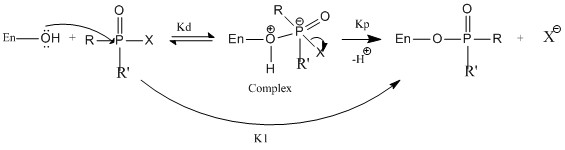
Inhibition of cholinesterase by ethion monoxon.

== Biotransformation ==
Biotransformation of ethion occurs in the liver, where it undergoes desulfurisation to form the active metabolite ethion monoxon. The enzyme cytochrome P-450 catalyzes this step. Because it contains an active oxygen, ethion monoxon is an inhibitor of the neuroenzyme cholinesterase (ChE). ChE can dephosphorylate organophosphate, so in the next step of the biotransformation, ethion monoxon is dephosphorylated and ChE is phosphorylated. The subsequent step in the biotransformation process is not yet completely known, yet it is understood that this happens via esterases in the blood and liver (1). Besides the dephosphorylation of ethion monoxon by ChE, it is likely that the ethion monoxon is partially oxidized toward ethion dioxon.

After solvent partitioning of urine from rats that had been fed ethion, it became clear that the metabolites found in the urine were 99% dissolved in the aqueous phase. This means that only non-significant levels (<1 %) were present in the organic phase and that the metabolites are very hydrophilic.

In a parallel study in goats, radioactive labeled ethion with incorporated ^{14}C was used. After identification of the ^{14}C residues in organs of the goats, such as the liver, heart, kidneys, muscles and fat tissue, it appeared that 0.03 ppm or less of the ^{14}C compounds present was non-metabolized ethion. The metabolites ethion monoxon and ethion dioxon were also not detected in any samples with a substantial threshold (0.005-0.01 ppm). In total, 64% to 75% of the metabolites from the tissues were soluble in methanol. After the addition of a protease, another 17% to 32% were solubilized. In the aqueous phase, at least four different radioactive metabolites were found. However, characterization of these compounds was repeatedly unsuccessful due to their high volatility. One compound was trapped in the kidney and was identified as formaldehyde. This is an indication that the ^{14}C of ethion is used in the formation of natural products.

== Toxicity ==
=== Summary of toxicity ===
Exposure to ethion can happen by ingestion, absorption via the skin, and inhalation. Exposure can lead to vomiting, diarrhea, headache, sweating, and confusion. Severe poisoning might lead to fatigue, involuntary muscle contractions, loss of reflexes and slurred speech. In even more severe cases, death will be the result of respiratory failure or cardiac arrest.

When being exposed through skin contact, the lowest dose to kill a rat was found to be 150 mg/kg for males and 50 mg/kg for females. The minimum survival time was 6 hours for female rats and 3 hours for male rats, and the maximum time of death was 3 days for females and 7 days for males. The LD50 was 245 mg /kg for male rats and 62 mg/kg for female rats.

When being exposed through ingestion, 10 mg/kg/day and 2 mg/kg/day showed no histopathological effect on the respiratory track of rats, nor did 13-week testing on dogs (8.25 mg/kg/day).

LD50 values for pure ethion in rats is 208 mg/kg, and for technical ethion is 21 to 191 mg/kg. Other reported oral LD50 values are 40 mg/kg in mice and guinea pigs. Furthermore, inhalation of ethion is very toxic - during one study which was looking at technical-grade ethion, an LC50 of 2.31 mg/m^3 was found in male rats and of 0.45 mg/m^3 in female rats. Other data reported a 4-hour LC50 in rats of 0.864 mg/L.

=== Acute toxicity ===
Ethion causes toxic effects following absorption via the skin, ingestion, and inhalation, and may cause burns when skin is exposed to it. According to Extoxnet, any form of exposure could result in the following symptoms: pallor, nausea, vomiting, diarrhea, abdominal cramps, headache, dizziness, eye pain, blurred vision, constriction or dilation of the eye pupils, tears, salivation, sweating, and confusion may develop within 12 hours. Severe poisoning may result in distorted coordination, loss of reflexes, slurred speech, fatigue and weakness, tremors of the tongue and eyelids, involuntary muscle contractions and can also lead to paralysis and respiratory problems. In more severe cases, ethion poisoning can lead to involuntary discharge of urine or feces, irregular heart beats, psychosis, loss of consciousness, and, in some cases, coma or death. Death is the result of respiratory failure or cardiac arrest. Hypothermia, AC heart blocks and arrhythmias are also found to be possible consequences of ethion poisoning. Ethion may also lead to delayed symptoms of other organophosphates.

==== Skin exposure ====
In rabbits receiving 250 mg/kg of technical-grade ethion for 21 days, the dermal exposure lead to increased cases of erythema and desquamation. It also lead to inhibition of brain acetylcholinesterase at 1 mg/kg/day and the NOAEL was determined to be 0.8 mg/kg/day. In guinea pigs, ethion ALS lead to a slight erythema that cleared in 48 hours, and it was determined that the compound was not a skin sensitizer.

In a study determining the LD50 of ethion, 80 male and 60 female adult rats were dermally exposed to ethion dissolved in xylene. The lowest dose to kill a rat was found to be 150 mg/kg for males and 50 mg/kg for females. The minimum survival time was 6 hours for females and 3 hours for males, while the maximum time of death was 3 days for females and 7 days for males. The LD50 was 245 mg /kg for males and 62 mg/kg for females. Skin contact with organophosphates, in general, may cause localized sweating and involuntary muscle contractions. Other studies found the LC50 via the dermal route to be 915 mg/kg in guinea pigs and 890 mg/kg in rabbits.

Ethion can also cause slight redness and inflammation to the eye and skin that will clear within 48 hours. It is also known to cause blurred vision, pupil constriction and pain.

==== Ingestion ====
A six-month-old boy experienced shallow excursions and intercostal retractions after accidentally ingesting 15.7 mg/kg ethion. The symptoms started one hour after ingestion, and were treated. Five hours after ingestion, respiratory arrest occurred and mechanical ventilation was needed for three hours. Following examinations after one week, one month and one year suggested that full recovery was made. The same boy also showed occurrence of tachycardia, frothy saliva (1 hour after ingestion), watery bowel movements (90 minutes after ingestion), increased white blood cell counts in urine, inability to control his head and limbs, occasional twitching, pupils non-reactive to light, purposeless eye movements, palpable liver and spleen, and there were some symptoms of paralysis.

Testing on rats with 10 mg/kg/day and 2 mg/kg/day showed no histopathological effect on the respiratory tract, nor did 13 week testing on dogs (8.25 mg/kg/day). LD_{50} values for pure ethion in rats of 208 mg/kg, and for technical-grade ethion of 21 to 191 mg/kg,. Other reported oral LD50 values (for the technical product) are 40 mg/kg in mice and guinea pigs. In a group of six male volunteers no differences in blood pressure or pulse rate were noted, neither in mice or dogs. Diarrhea did occur in mice orally exposed to ethion, severe signs of neurotoxicity were also present. The effects were consistent with cholinergic over stimulation of the gastrointestinal tract.

No hematological effects were reported in an experiment with six male volunteers, nor in rats or dogs. The volunteers did not show differences in muscle tone after intermediate-duration oral exposure, nor did the testing animals to different exposure. It is however knows that ethion can result in muscle tremors and fasciculations. The animal-testing studies on rats and dogs showed no effect on the kidneys and liver, but a different study showed an increased incidence in orange-colored urine. The animal-testing studies on rats and dogs did also not show dermal or ocular effects.

Rabbits, receiving 2.5 mg/kg/day of ethion showed a decrease in body weight, but no effects were seen at 0.6 mg/kg/day. The decrease body, combined with reduced food consumption, was observed for rabbits receiving 9.6 mg/kg/day . Male and female dogs receiving 0.71 mg/kg/day did not show a change in body weight, but dogs receiving 6.9 and 8.25 mg/kg/day showed reduced food consumption and reduced body weight.

In a study with human volunteers, a decrease of plasma cholinesterase was observed during 0.075 mg/kg/day (16% decrease), 0.1 mg/kg/day (23% decrease) and 0.15 mg/kg/day (31%decrease) treatment periods. This was partially recovered after 7 days, and fully recovered after 12 days. No effect on erythrocyte acetylcholinesterase was observed, nor signs of adverse neurological effects. Another study showed severe neurological effects after a single oral exposure in rats. For male rats, salivation, tremors, nose bleeding, urination, diarrhea, and convulsions occurred at 100 mg/kg, and for female rats, at 10 mg/kg. In a study with albino rats, it was observed that brain acetylcholinesterase was inhibited by 22%, erythrocyte acetylcholinesterase by 87%, and plasma cholinesterase by 100% in male rats after being fed 9 mg/kg/day of ethion for 93 days. After 14 days of recovery, plasma cholinesterase recovered completely, and erythrocyte acetylcholinesterase recovered 63%. There were no observed effects at 1 mg/kg/day. In a study involving various rats, researchers observed no effects on erythrocyte acetylcholinesterase at 0, 0.1, 0.2, and 2 mg/kg/day of ethion. In a 90-day study on dogs, in which the males received 6.9 mg/kg/day and the females 8.25 mg/kg/day, ataxia, emesis, miosis, and tremors were observed. Brain and erythrocyte acetylcholinesterase were inhibited (61-64% and 93-04%, respectively). At 0.71 mg/kg/day in male dogs, the reduction in brain acetylcholinesterase was 23%. There were no observed effects at 0.06 and 0.01 mg/kg/day. Based on these findings, a minimal risk level of 0,002 mg/kg/day for oral exposure for acute and intermediate duration was established. Researchers also calculated a chronic-duration minimal risk level of 0.0004 mg/kg/day.

In one study, in which rats received a maximum of 1.25 mg/kg/day, no effects on reproduction were observed. In a study on pregnant river rats, eating 2.5 mg/kg/day, it was observed that the fetuses had increased incidence of delayed ossification of pubes. Another study found that the fetuses of pregnant rabbits, eating 9.6 mg/kg/day had increased incidence of fused sterna centers.

==== Inhalation ====
Ethion is quite toxic to lethal via inhalation. One study, looking at technical-grade ethion, found an LC50 of 2.31 mg/m3 in male rats and of 0.45 mg/m3 in female rats. Other data reported a 4-hour LC50 in rats of 0.864 mg/L. As stated earlier, ethion can also lead to pupillary constriction, muscle cramps, excessive salivation, sweating, nausea, dizziness, labored breathing, convulsions, and unconsciousness. A sensation of tightness in the chest and rhinorrhea are also very common after inhalation.

=== Carcinogenic effects ===
There are no indications that ethion is carcinogenic in rats and mice. When rats and mice were fed ethion for two years, the animals did not develop cancer any faster than the control group of animals that were not given ethion. Ethion has not been classified for carcinogenicity by the United States Department of Health and Human Services (DHHS), the International Agency for Research on Cancer (IARC) or the EPA.

== Treatment ==
When orally exposed, gastric lavage shortly after exposure can be used to reduce the peak absorption. It is also suspected that treatment with active charcoal could be effective to reduce peak absorption. Safety guidelines also encourage to induce vomiting to reduce oral exposure, if the victim is still conscious.

In case of skin exposure, it is advised to wash and rinse with plenty of water and soap to reduce exposure. In case of inhalation, fresh air is advised to reduce exposure.

Treating the ethion-exposure itself is done in the same way as exposure with other organophosphates. The main danger lies in respiratory problems - if symptoms are present, then artificial respiration with an endotracheal tube is used as a treatment. The effect of ethion on muscles or nerves is counteracted with atropine. Pralidoxime can be used to act against organophosphate poisoning, this must be given as fast as possible after the ethion poisoning, for its efficacy is inhibited by the chemical change of ethion-enzyme in the body that occurs over time.

== Effects on animals ==
Ethion has an influence on the environment as it is persistent and thus might accumulate through plants and animals. When looking at songbirds, ethion is very toxic. The LD50 in red-winged blackbirds is 45 mg/kg. However, it is moderately toxic to birds like the bobwhite quail (LD50 is 128.8 mg/kg) and starlings (LD50 is greater than 304 mg/kg). These birds would be classified as 'medium sized birds. When looking at larger, upland game birds (like the ring-necked pheasant and waterfowl like the mallard duck, ethion varies from barely toxic to nontoxic. Ethion, however, is very toxic to aquatic organisms like freshwater and marine fish, and is extremely toxic to freshwater invertebrates, with an average LD50 of 0.056 μg/L to 0.0077 mg/L. The LD50 for marine and estuarine invertebrates are 0.04 to 0.05 mg/L.

In a chronic toxicity study, rats were fed 0, 0.1, 0.2 or 2 mg/kg/day ethion for 18 months, and no severe toxic effects were observed. The only significant change was a decrease of cholinesterase levels in the group with the highest dose. Therefore, the NOEL of this study was 0.2 mg/kg. The oral LD50 for pure ethion in rats is 208 mg/kg. The dermal LD50 in rats is 62 mg/kg, 890 mg/kg in rabbits, and 915 mg/kg in guinea pigs. For rats, the 4-hour LD50 is 0.864 mg/L ethion.

== Detection Methods ==
Insecticides such as ethion can be detected by using a variety of chemical analysis methods. Some analysis methods, however, are not specific for this substance. In a recently introduced method, the interaction of silver nanoparticles (AgNPs) with ethion results in the quenching of the resonance relay scattering (RRS) intensity. The change in RRS was shown to be linearly correlated to the concentration of ethion (range: 10.0–900 mg/L). Another advantage of this method over general detection methods is that ethion can be measured in just 3 minutes with no requirement for pretreatment of the sample. From interference tests, it was shown that this method achieves good selectivity for ethion. The limit of detection (LOD) was 3.7 mg/L and limit of quantification (LOQ) was 11.0 mg/L. Relative standard deviations (RSDs) for samples containing 15.0 and 60.0 mg/L of ethion in water were 4.1 and 0.2 mg/L, respectively.

== Microbial degradation ==
Ethion remains a major environmental contaminant in Australia, among other locations, because of its former usage in agriculture. However, there are some microbes that can convert ethion into less toxic compounds. Some Pseudomonas and Azospirillum bacteria were shown to degrade ethion when cultivated in minimal salts medium, where ethion was the only source of carbon. Analysis of the compounds present in the medium after bacterial digestion of ethion demonstrated that no abiotic hydrolytic degradation products of ethion (e.g., ethion dioxon or ethion monoxon) were present. The biodigestion of ethion is likely used to support rapid growth of these bacteria.
