= To Light a Candle (film) =

2014 documentary by Maziar Bahari

To Light a Candle is a documentary by journalist Maziar Bahari, author of the memoir Then They Came for Me.

The film highlights the persecution of Baháʼís in Iran, and focuses on the stories of those individuals associated with the shutdown of Baháʼí Institute for Higher Education. The film had its World Premiere at Stanford University in May 2014. The film was narrated by actor and activist Nazanin Boniadi.

It follows a number of other films on the same topic, most notably Iranian Taboo (2011) by Reza Allamehzadeh and The Gardener (2012) by Mohsen Makhmalbaf.
