= Field day =

Field day may refer to:

- For the armed forces use and its derivatives, see wiktionary:field day
- Field day (agriculture), a trade show
- Field Day (amateur radio), an annual amateur radio exercise
- Field Day (band), a Canadian pop-punk band from Calgary, Alberta
- Field Day (festival), a music festival in London
- Field Day (Sydney festival), an outdoor music festival held every year on New Years Day in Sydney
- Field Day Theatre Company, Irish theatre and publishing company
- Field Day (Dag Nasty album)
- Field Day (Marshall Crenshaw album)
- Field Day (Anthony Phillips album)
- Field Day (video game), a 1984 video game
- Sports day, a competitive event held by schools
- Club Day, an English community celebration
- "Field Day", a 1991 episode of the PBS show Shining Time Station

== See also ==
- Field trip
- Excursion
- Day Field
