= Bihe =

Bihe can refer to:

- Viye, also known as Bihe, one of the traditional independent Ovimbundu kingdoms in Angola
- Baháʼí Institute for Higher Education (BIHE), a university in Iran designed and managed by the Baháʼí community for Iranian Baháʼís who are excluded from access to higher education in their country
