= Mohammad Maleki =

Iranian academic (1933–2020)

- محمد ملکی
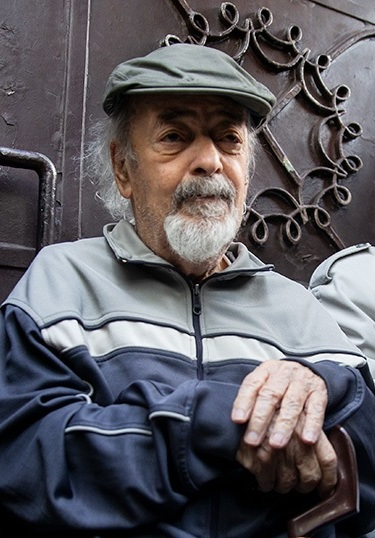
- Maleki in 2019
- Born: 11 July 1933; Shemiran, Iran
- Died: 1 December 2020 (aged 87); Tehran, Iran
- Education: University of Tehran
- Occupations: Professor; writer; human rights activist
- Known for: Chancellor of the University of Tehran (1979)
- Political party: National Front; Council of Nationalist-Religious Activists
- Spouse: Ghodsi Mirmoez (m. 1965; died 2020)
- Children: 1

Mohammad Maleki (Persian: محمد ملکی; 11 July 1933 – 1 December 2020) was an Iranian academic and pro-democracy nationalist-religious activist who served as president of the University of Tehran.

== Life and career ==
Maleki was a founder of Legam, the Campaign for Step by Step Abolition of the Death Penalty. He appealed for the judiciary to uphold the constitutional rights of non-Muslims, and called for investigation into the persecution of members of the Baháʼí Faith.

Due to his activism, he was arrested numerous times by Iranian police. On August 22, 2009, he was arrested again in the context of the unrest after 2009 presidential election. In early March 2010 he was released on bail after spending about three months in solitary confinement. He was charged with Moharebeh for alleged "contact with unspecified foreign groups and working to undermine the Islamic system" and “insulting the founder of the Islamic Republic Ayatollah Khomeini and Ayatollah Khamenei.” Maleki was hospitalised several times for a heart attack and other physical problems including prostate cancer during his detention. He was also reportedly denied access to an adequate treatment, and later (September 2011), wrote a brief report to the United Nations Special Rapporteur on Iran on the tortures he had suffered during his prison terms for which he was subsequently interrogated and received a notice banning him from travelling abroad.

Maleki at first refused to attend the Islamic Revolutionary Court, and at the second hearing July 30, 2011 refused to defend himself and said he would not appeal the sentence, because he considered the court of first instance to be illegal. He was finally sentenced on the charge of “propaganda against the system.” He was released but as of 25 January 2012 was summoned to serve a one-year prison term.

In 2013 Maleki publicly apologized for his part in turning away students from Iranian universities leaving them the only option of the Baháʼí Institute for Higher Education, a home based university-class system. The meeting was filmed by film director Mohammad Nourizad and Maleki posted the event to his Facebook page.

Mohammad Maleki had repeatedly attempted to obtain permission to leave the country to see his family and to seek medical treatment, but his requests for a passport were refused. In April 2015, he again wrote an open letter to the UN Special Rapporteur on Iran, in which he stated: “I have not committed theft, fraud or any other criminal offence. I have been deprived of my civil rights solely for my [political] beliefs … and human rights activities... I wish to visit my son after seven years... This is the obvious right and the deep wish of every father.” Amnesty International considers the travel ban against Mohammad Maleki to be a retaliatory violation of human rights guaranteed under Article 12 of the International Covenant on Civil and Political Rights, to which Iran is a party. Amnesty appealed that Mohammad Maleki be allowed to leave Iran, to visit family members who live in Canada and the Netherlands, and to seek medical treatment.
