= Mohammad Nourizad =

- محمد نوری‌زاد
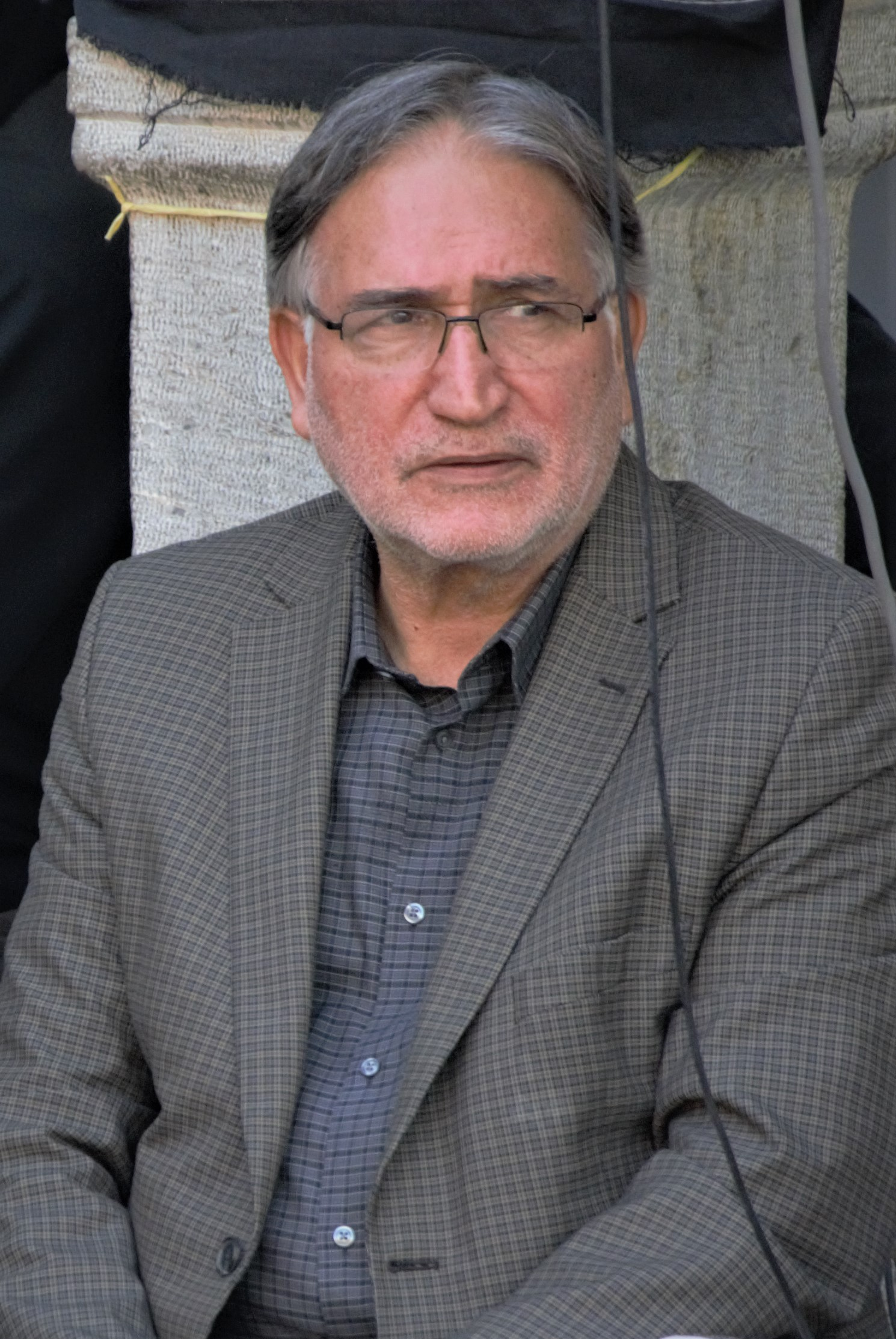
- Born: 10 December 1952 (age 73); Tehran, Imperial Iran
- Occupations: Director, activist, journalist
- Years active: 1982–present
- Spouse: Fatemeh Maleki
- Children: 3
- Website: http://nurizad.info

Mohammad Nourizad (Persian: محمد نوری زاد), born 10 December 1952) is an Iranian filmmaker, activist, and former journalist for the conservative daily Kayhan. He was arrested in April 2010 after writing a letter to Ayatollah Ali Khamenei, Iran's supreme leader, urging him to apologize to the nation for the bloody crackdown on the opposition, after the disputed 2009 June presidential elections. He was again arrested in August 2019, for protesting at another dissident's trial, and convicted in August 2020.

== Arrests ==
In November 2009, Nourizad wrote an open letter to Ayatollah Ali Khamenei, urging him to apologize to the opposition for the bloody crackdown of the 2009 Iranian presidential election protests. The letter read in part,

"As commander in chief of the armed forces, you didn't treat people well after the election. Your agents opened fire, killed the people, beat them and destroyed and burnt their property. Your role in this can't be ignored, ... Your apology can cool down the wrath of the people."

In April 2010, Nourizad was arrested on charges of insulting the officials and propaganda against the regime. On April 18, it was reported that Nourizad was sentenced to three-and-a-half years in prison and 50 lashes. The sentence was confirmed in early June 2012, shortly before the anniversary of the election protests. He was released after 170 days.

A year earlier, Nourizad had "aroused a wave of protest and criticism" with an article on his blog (Gah-e Nevesht) calling for Iran's leading clerics to avoid getting involved in governmental affairs, after several such clerics called for the dismissal of President Mahmoud Ahmadinejad's vice president, Esfandiar Rahim Mashaei. (Mashaei had made a statement regarding the friendly relations between the Iranian nation and the Israeli people, as opposed to the Israeli state.)

On August 18, 2020, Nourizad's lawyer said that his client had sentenced to eight months in prison, 74 lashes and a one-year exile for "Presence in Front of Courthouse", and a further 74 lashes for "spreading lies". The first conviction was in relation to Nourizad having been present in front of a courthouse in Mashhad on August 10, 2019, while another dissident was on trial.

== Hunger strike ==
On 11 December 2010, Nourizad started a hunger strike to protest a lack of attention from Iranian authorities to his complaints of alleged mistreatment by interrogators at the Evin prison. On 16 December authorities detained his family members after they showed up outside the prison to inquire about his failing health.

== Apologizing for Ayatollah Ali Khamenei ==
On July 15, 2013, Nourizad kissed the feet of a 4-year-old Baháʼí boy whose parents had been arrested for participation in the Baháʼí Institute for Higher Education, saying: "…why shouldn't I kiss your feet as a representative of the office of [Iran's Supreme Leader Ayatollah Ali Khamenei] and the [many] Shi'ite sources of emulation?" and published the event on his blog. The boy's father responded in a letter from prison dated July 18 saying in part: "Mr. Nourizad! Standing before Artin, you knelt and kissed his feet. I found this to be an utmost expression of love and respect, not to Artin but to the pure human spirit. At the same time, I wish that no person be forced to kneel before another person out of shame. …. Mr. Nourizad! You asked Artin to slap you and to spit on you. I heard this request as your attempt to ease his pain, and the utmost sign of your honesty and your acceptance of responsibility. At the same time, I wish that no human body should have to be exposed to such a thing, as the body houses the human spirit and the human spirit is a display of the Divine one."

In September 2013, Nourizad filmed Mohammad Maleki, former Rector of the University of Tehran, publicly apologizing in a similar way for his part in turning away Baháʼí students from Iranian universities.

== Voice from prison ==
On 29 April 2020 a voice file (duration: 7:33 minutes) attributed to Mohammad Nourizad was published on Shirin Ebadi's official Telegram channel, in which Mohammad Nourizad, from Vakil-Abad prison in Mashhad, announced:

“… as to protest against the pressure on my family, I decided to commit voluntary suicide and its news will spread in ten, five, six days. I didn't voice but veracity. [...] I am here [in prison] for telling the truth; then the liars and the thieves and the murderers are out. [...] I wish, one day, [my people] get rid of Mullah and the irresponsibles and the non-transparents”.

== Filmography ==
Year	English title	Persian	Length	Notes
1986	All together	Hame ba Ham		Director and screenwriter
1989	Thirsty Palmae	Nakhlestan-e Teshne		Director and screenwriter
1990	The Sea for You	Darya baraye To		Screenwriter only
1991	The Bullets and the Flowers	Gol-ha va Golouleh-ha		Screenwriter only
2000	Waiting	Entezar		Director and screenwriter
2005	The Persian Prince	Shahzadeh-ye Parsi		Director and screenwriter
2007	My Southern Land	Sarzamin-e Jonoubi-ye Man		Director and screenwriter
2009	Flags of Kaveh's Castle	Parcham-haye Ghal'eye Kaveh		Director and screenwriter

== Awards ==
- 2009 - Best Story at Noor Iranian Film Festival in Los Angeles.
