= Martyrdom in the Baháʼí Faith =

Martyrdom in the Baháʼí Faith is the act of sacrificing one's life in the service of humanity and in the name of God. In Hidden Words, Baháʼu'lláh's revelation incites believers towards martyrdom: "O son of being! Seek a martyr's death in My path, content with My pleasure […] To tinge thy hair with thy blood is greater in My sight than the creation of the universe and the light of both worlds. Strive then to attain this, O servant!"

However, Baháʼu'lláh, the founder of the Baháʼí Faith, discouraged the literal meaning of sacrificing one's life, and instead offered the explanation that martyrdom is devoting oneself to service for humanity. ʻAbdu'l-Bahá, Baháʼu'lláh's son and appointed interpreter, explained that the truest form of martyrdom is a lifelong sacrifice to serve humanity in the name of God. While the Baháʼí Faith exalts the station of its martyrs, martyrdom is not something that Baháʼís are encouraged to pursue; instead one is urged to value and protect one's life.

In the history of the Baháʼí Faith there are many who are considered martyrs. The Baháʼí Faith grew out of a separate religion, Bábism, which Baháʼís see as part of their own history. In Bábism, martyrdom had the literal meaning of sacrificing one's life and was seen as a public declaration of sincerity and devotion to God. During the 1840s and 1850s the Báb claimed to be the return of the Mahdi and gained a strong following. The Persian clergy tried to stop the spread of the Bábí movement by denouncing the Bábís as apostates; these denouncements led to public executions of the Bábís, troop engagements against the Bábís, and an extensive pogrom where thousands of Bábís were killed. In addition, the Báb himself was publicly executed in 1850. The Bábís that were killed during these times are seen as martyrs by Baháʼís, and the date of execution of the Báb, is considered a holy day in the Baháʼí calendar as the Martyrdom of the Báb. Also among the Bábí executions was the poet Táhirih, one of the Báb's eighteen disciples, who Baháʼís consider the first woman suffrage martyr.

After Baháʼu'lláh abstracted the meaning of martyrdom, gave it a new meaning, and abolished holy war, the Bábís who became Baháʼís stopped seeking martyrdom as a public declaration of devotion.

An early sequence of incidents with the religion in the West related to martyrdom begins in 1901. A small group of women sought a diplomatic intervention to a particular wave of persecutions. This did not lead to fruition. However a significant step forward was then undertaken by Lua Getsinger. In her fervor to become a martyr for the religion like Táhirih she enlisted two friends to pray for her with Bábí prayers and asked ʻAbdu'l-Bahá to grant her request on her behalf. ʻAbdu'l-Bahá's response paraphrased was that martyrdom was a high station which Baháʼu'lláh conferred on whomever he chose and that the physical fact of being killed was not the point, for there were those who had not been killed but were counted as martyrs, and also those who had been killed but who had not attained the station of a martyr. The essence of martyrdom was service, and she had, "thanks be to God", arisen to serve. Documentation is lacking but somehow a particular mission came to mind. ʻAbdu'l-Bahá saw the time, place, and person of Lua appropriate to the task. On July 5, 1902, Lua got a passport in her own name in New York. Lua was then France before September 28.^{Kindle:4359} She was there to present a petition to Mozaffar ad-Din Shah Qajar, then ruler of Iran, with Mariam Haney, while he was in Paris. She was not immediately welcomed. Lua began prolonged prayer vigils to be allowed to present a petition in person. Hippolyte Dreyfus assisted Lua by translating the petition into French, and to gain an audience,^{Kindle:3200} and, refusing to be put off by his Grand Vizier, Lua finally met directly with the Shah himself. The petition was primarily that he protect the Baháʼís of Persia from the persecution that was going on.

“…in the grand reception hall of the Elysee Palace hotel where the entire suite of one hundred and fifty Persians were awaiting His Majesty, this one American woman, the only woman in this large group of men, stepped forward and handed to His Majesty the petition she had faithfully written. Lua also delivered a forceful speech suggesting that such 'uncivilized' cruelty was shaming Persia, and that if the mullás examined the history of Islam, 'they would soon see that the shedding of blood is not a means of annulling, but rather the cause of promulgating every religious movement.' Lua then told the assembled men a heartrending story of a woman whose husband, brother and eleven year-old son were viciously killed by mobs, and when the woman 'throws herself upon their mangled corpses' she 'is beaten into insensibility'. Lua asked the Shah, '…is it justice on the part of your Majesty to allow such heinous crimes to go unpunished?"... For the sake of justice, in large part for women, [Lua] boldly puts herself forward to stand alone in a group of men against the orthodoxy of the mullahs and the state, ... considered of little account, and, moreover, a western woman, stereotypically morally suspect in eastern male eyes..., considered ritually 'unclean' by Muslims, and worse, a Baháʼí, maligned in Persia ... relied only on words, ...[her] 'motherhood'[, h]er irresistible charm, her remarkable gifts as a teacher, her forceful character and unique personality...." The Shah agreed to intercede on behalf of the Baháʼís though conditions in Iran only subsided a few years.

Baháʼís continued to be persecuted in predominantly Muslim countries, like Morocco in 1962-3 and especially in Iran where over 200 Baháʼís were executed between 1978 and 1998. Because the Baháʼí Faith has no clergy, the adherents will choose a Spiritual Assembly, at a local or national level, to carry out the affairs of the community. Following the 1979 Iranian Revolution, the Iranian authorities executed three consecutive National Spiritual Assemblies: all nine members, plus two staff, in 1980; eight of the nine replacement members, in 1981; and seven of the next nine replacement members, between 1984 and 1987. Such deaths are also considered martyrdom. Mona Mahmudnizhad, one of the martyrs, is the subject of the Mark Perry play A Dress for Mona and Doug Cameron's song "Mona With the Children".

== See also ==
- Persecution of Baháʼís
- Statements about the persecution of Baháʼís
