= Harvest excursion =

A harvest excursion was a common practice in Canada in the late nineteenth and early twentieth century where large numbers of workers would travel to the Canadian prairies to participate in the fall harvest.

There were long severe labour shortages on the Canadian prairies and these became extreme during the weeks of the fall harvest when millions of acres of crops needed to be brought in during a short period of time from September to October. Thus in 1890 harvest excursions were organized by the Canadian Pacific Railway (CPR) in which special trains would transport workers from Eastern Canada to the prairie centres. There they would be hired by agents and travel to farms across the prairies. The labourers were given low fares by the CPR as the railway knew that they would later earn a great deal from transporting the harvest. The CPR was also the largest landholder in the west and it hoped that some of the excursioners would decide to settle in the west and buy some railway land.

Many of the labourers came from Ontario, Quebec, and the Maritimes, but as demand increased workers began to be pulled from British Columbia, the United States, and Great Britain. Wages were high, the highest a labourer could earn in Canada. A season's work could earn up to three hundred dollars. As room and board were normally provided, the only expense was the thirty to forty dollars for the train trip west.

While wages were high, conditions were poor. The trains that carried the workers were crowded and unsanitary, with few stops on the way. There was rarely enough accommodation for the workers in the west and many were forced into crowded, substandard housing. In years with a poor harvest too many people could be brought west and some would find themselves out of work. In 1928 a mass of thousands of British workers who could not find work threatened to become violent and were shipped back across the Atlantic at government expense. For the western towns the annual arrival of the raucous excursioners was a major disruption with common instances of violence, drunkenness and theft.

During the First World War the need for labour in the west was even more pressing as thousands of young men had enlisted. An extended campaign drawing on patriotism saw an unprecedented number travel west. The excursion peaked in the mid-1920s with over 50,000 workers per season travelling west. By the late 1920s the development of the combine harvester and other equipment dramatically cut the need for labour. The onset of the Great Depression ended the practice completely as high excess production and unemployment affected the prairies.
