= Excursions (film) =

- Directed by: Daniel Martinico
- Written by: Hugo Armstrong; Daniel Martinico
- Starring: Jacqueline Wright; Hugo Armstrong; Mandy Freund; Cody Henderson
- Release date: January 22, 2016 (Slamdance Film Festival)
- Running time: 80 minutes
- Country: United States
- Language: English

Excursions is an American independent film directed by Daniel Martinico. The film follows two couples who retreat to a remote cabin in the woods for mysterious purposes. It was written by Martinico and Hugo Armstrong, who collaborated previously on the 2012 film OK, Good.

== Release ==
Excursions premiered in the Beyond program at the 2016 Slamdance Film Festival, and subsequently screened at the Chicago Underground Film Festival and New Orleans Film Festival, among others. The film was presented by Slamdance Cinema Club and ArcLight Cinemas as part of the ArcLight Presents screening series in Hollywood and Chicago in July 2016. It was named one of the 10 best undistributed films of 2016 by The Film Stage.
