= Diaphragmatic excursion =

Movement of the diaphragm during breathing

Diaphragmatic excursion is the movement of the thoracic diaphragm during breathing.

Normal diaphragmatic excursion should be 3–5 cm, but can be increased in well-conditioned persons to 7–8 cm. This measures the contraction of the diaphragm.

It is performed by asking the patient to exhale and hold it. The doctor then percusses down their back in the intercostal margins (bone will be dull), starting below the scapula, until sounds change from resonant to dull (lungs are resonant, solid organs should be dull). That is where the provider marks the spot. Then the patient takes a deep breath in and holds it as the provider percusses down again, marking the spot where the sound changes from resonant to dull again. Then the provider will measure the distance between the two spots. Repeat on the other side, is usually higher up on the right side. If it is less than 3–5 cm the patient may have a pneumonia or a pneumothorax in which a chest x-ray is diagnostic for either.
