= Baháʼí Institute for Higher Education =

Open university in Iran

The Baháʼí Institute for Higher Education (BIHE), is a unique open university in Iran, which has been incorrectly portrayed as an underground university, established by the Baháʼí community of Iran in 1987 to meet the educational needs of young people who have been systematically denied access to higher education by the Iranian government. Currently, through a main faculty in Iran and an Affiliated Global Faculty from universities around the world, BIHE offers a total of 56 undergraduate and graduate programs in Sciences, Engineering, Business and Management, Humanities, and Social Sciences. More than 116 universities in North America, Europe, and Australia have thus far accepted the BIHE's graduates directly into programs of graduate study at the masters and doctoral levels. BIHE has a decentralized and fluid structure and uses a hybrid approach of offline and online delivery methods which has enabled it to grow under unusual sociopolitical circumstances. Despite numerous arrests, periodic raids, several imprisonments, mass confiscation of school equipment and general harassment, BIHE has continued and even expanded its operation. BIHE has received praise for offering a non-violent, creative, and constructive response to ongoing oppression.

== Context ==
=== Persecution of the Baháʼís of Iran ===
Since its birth in the 19th century, the Baháʼí community of Iran has faced different forms of persecution including hostile propaganda and censorship, social exclusion, denial of education and employment, confiscation and destruction of property, arson, unjustified arrests and imprisonment, physical and psychological torture, death threats, arbitrary executions and disappearances. The Islamic Revolution of 1979 intensified the persecutions and made Baháʼís – the largest religious minority of the country – the target of a systematic state-sponsored campaign of repression. Within this ongoing campaign, over two hundred Baháʼís have been executed; thousands more have been imprisoned, have lost their jobs, been denied their pensions, been expelled from schools and universities, been denied health care, had their personal property plundered, and had their grave sites defiled. The modern persecution of Iranian Baháʼís now continues in its fourth decade. In the 2016 annual report to the UN General Assembly, UN Secretary General Ban Ki-moon, refers to the Baháʼí community of Iran as "the most severely persecuted religious minority" of the country.

=== Denial of the right to education ===
The denial of the right to higher education is a tool wielded by the Iranian government on many whose ideology contradicts or threatens the authority of the ruling clerics; however, the Baháʼís are the only group to face pervasive class denial of this right. The efforts of the Iranian government to deny Baháʼís the right to education is seen by Baháʼís as part of its coordinated efforts to eradicate the Baháʼí community as a viable group within Iranian society.

Shortly after the Iranian Revolution in 1979, large numbers of Baháʼí students, ranging across the entire education system from primary through secondary and university level, were expelled from schools and blocked from continuing their education. Similarly, Baháʼí professors and faculty members were dismissed from all universities and academic institutions of the country. In the 1980s, partly in response to international pressure, primary and secondary school children were allowed to re-enroll. However, up to today the government has maintained the ban on the entry of Baháʼí youth into public and private colleges and universities.

The official decree barring Baháʼí students from admission to public university was issued in 1981. That year universities established a new admission system where only individuals who identified themselves with one of the four religions recognized by the Constitution of the Islamic Republic of Iran – i.e. Islam, Christianity, Judaism and Zoroastrianism – were given admission. The systematic expulsion of students and faculty had become clear to Baháʼís by 1983.

In 1991, the government reiterated that policy, in a private memorandum prepared by the Iranian Revolutionary Council and approved by Ayatollah Khamenei which states that "The Government's dealings with [the Baháʼís] must be in such a way that their progress and development are blocked. ... They can be enrolled in schools provided they have not identified themselves as Baháʼís. ... Preferably they should be enrolled in schools which have a strong and imposing religious ideology. ... They must be expelled from universities, either in the admission process or during the course of their studies, once it becomes known that they are Baháʼís."

Over the years, various ploys at different stages of university admission process including application, entrance examination and enrollment have been used to exclude Baháʼís from public and private colleges and universities. From a small number of Baháʼí students who have been able to register and start their studies at universities, the majority have been expelled at some point before graduation.

== Formation and developments ==
After failed attempts to persuade the government of Iran to admit qualified Baháʼí students to universities, the Baháʼí community of Iran rallied its limited resources to make higher education available to its youth and young adults. In a collective effort, a small core of professors, lecturers and researchers who had been discharged from their jobs because of membership in the religion worked on developing an informal network of higher education. These efforts culminated in the establishment of the BIHE – initially known as the "scientific program" in 1987.

Gradually, the program expanded and took on a more formal character. By the mid-1990s, it had turned into an extensive institute which became known as the "open university" or Baháʼí Institute for Higher Education (BIHE). With the advent of the internet and increasing assistance from collaborators abroad, BIHE's curricular standards were bolstered and a wider range of majors and concentrations was introduced.

Despite tremendous logistical constraints and the Iranian authorities' attempts to shut BIHE down through raids, arrests and imprisonment of key faculty and staff, the university has been producing impressive results, with many of its students continuing to Master and Doctoral programs in universities in other countries. Today, through the work of approximately 955 faculty and administrative staff, BIHE offers 17 undergraduate, 16 graduate and 4 associate degree programs in sciences, engineering, business and management, humanities, and social sciences. Additionally BIHE offers 11 vocational programs, 3 one-year foundation programs, and 5 graduate certificate programs.

== Mode of operation ==
In its early days, BIHE functioned like a correspondence school with faculty and students exchanging lessons and assignments via the state-run postal system. Since professors could not deliver lectures openly, they prepared lecture notes and compiled textbooks for distribution to the students. Upon noticing that the government had been examining and intercepting the mail packages to disrupt the university's work, the BIHE devised its own courier service through volunteer messengers, who collected assignments from all the students in a locality by motorbike, sorted them and then delivered them to the professors.

Over time, with the expansion of its operation, the university started to organize small-group classes in private homes. These were complemented with specialized classrooms and laboratories organized in privately owned commercial buildings near and in Tehran. The BIHE system also featured a network of special depository libraries in the private homes of Baháʼís around the country. Numbering more than 45, these libraries enabled students in each district to obtain the necessary textbooks and course literature and material.

Since 2005, the BIHE has undertaken a modernization and expansion program, which includes the full incorporation of the internet into its activities. As a result, currently BIHE operates on a model of hybrid learning which includes both traditional offline methods as well as increasing online components. Traditional classroom and seminar presentations provide important learning spaces for BIHE students. In addition, many courses have evolved from exclusively offline events into hybrid ones. The incorporation of online components into BIHE's delivery method has allowed the university to expand its courses and programs by using international faculty.

== Locations ==
The university does not have a physical campus. It operates using a hybrid model including both traditional face-to-face and online classes. There is no specific location for in-person classes. They are rotating and held at the homes of students and other members of the Baháʼí community. Occasionally some classes are held at rented isolated locations. The hosts voluntarily offer their homes for in-person classes despite the threats and risks involved. Specific locations in Tehran and its vicinity, such as a floor of a residential home or a private commercial entity are prepared to be used as laboratories. Many security measures are taken to avoid attracting attention. These laboratories have been raided numerous times by the government and sealed. Each time they have been reinstated at a different location after some time has passed.

== Distinctive features ==
=== Creative and constructive response to oppression ===
The establishment of the BIHE has been regarded as a creative and non-violent response to the ongoing campaign of the Iranian government to deprive Iranian Baháʼí youth of access to higher education. Rather than losing their agency in the face of oppression, Iranian Baháʼís have been actively constructing their own institution and empowering their youth through education. It has provided a constructive alternative to organizing politically against the authorities or feeling victimized.

BIHE has been praised for the model it offers to minority groups in self-preservation, coping, survival and thriving under discriminatory sociopolitical circumstances.

=== Decentralized and fluid structure ===
The institute is decentralized and its functions reach the entire country through a combination of in-person and online classes with the former being held at the homes of students, faculty and other volunteer members of the community. In each province or region, local administrative assistants perform certain logistics and managerial tasks. Parts of the application and admission process as well as student advisory services and conducting examinations are also carried out throughout the same network on the local level. Lecturers construct their courses free from the prescriptions of a single organizational body and a networks of teaching assistants collaborate in the actual delivery of education. Independence of lecturers from administrators, teaching assistants from lecturers, and students from all – creates adaptability in the BIHE, and this facet of its character has been preserved and complemented by the ongoing process of modernization and the shift toward online learning.

=== Volunteerism and service ===
The BIHE relies to a great extent on the volunteerism and spirit of service. Baháʼí faculty members give their time as a form of community service and are not being paid. In addition to the academic staff, a network of community volunteers provide logistical support such as transportation, accommodation, and hosting of classes, exams and other academic events. Over time, volunteering structures have evolved organically. A study shows that the staff and the community members find volunteering in the BIHE a meaningful path of community service and are motivated by their feelings of love and care for the youth. Many of the BIHE students who finish their graduate studies abroad choose to return to Iran to volunteer at BIHE despite knowing that they will face many difficulties.

=== Community mobilization ===
The BIHE is a participatory community-owned initiative through which a community has been able to draw from its own resources and talents to take charge of the development of its youth. Broad grassroots input of everyone, and not just the elite, is welcomed and all members of the community are invited and motivated to contribute to a shared goal. BIHE activities have also united and strengthened Baháʼí community cohesion despite the pressures of sociopolitical marginalization.

=== Prolonged resilience ===
The BIHE is a resilient organization, surviving approaching four decades. It came into existence against the backdrop of intense persecution. It has flourished despite formidable restraints and has survived and continued its work in the face of government's campaigns to disrupt its work. In each crisis, the BIHE has proven itself adaptable and determined to continue working despite sustained opposition. Some see the BIHE's ability to adapt to ever-changing circumstances as a key factor in its continued success. One study claims the synergy between marginalized but dedicated students working with marginalized but dedicated staff to be the source of the BIHE's resilience in the face of hostilities.

=== Responding to social and emotional needs ===
BIHE responds to various needs of discriminated students by providing them access to higher education and enabling them to remain socially and academically engaged. A large number of BIHE staff are Iranian Baháʼís who have been expelled from their jobs in academia as a result of their allegiance to the Baháʼí Faith.

== Academics ==
=== Degrees and programs ===
As of 2024, BIHE offers a total of 56 university-level programs across five faculties in Sciences, Engineering, Business and Management, Humanities, and Social Sciences.

Undergraduate programs:

- Accounting
- Architecture
- Biological Sciences
- Business Administration
- Chemical Engineering
- Computer Science
- English Language Studies
- Law
- Music
- Persian Literature
- Psychology
- Pharmaceutical Sciences
- Pharmacy
- Sociology
- Structural Engineering
- Transportation Engineering
- Water and Waste Engineering

Graduate programs:

- Master of Applied Environmental Science
- Counseling Psychology
- Construction Management
- Child and Adolescent Psychology
- Curriculum Development
- Community Health Promotion
- Human Rights
- International Law
- MBA
- Neurosciences
- Persian Literature
- Public Health
- Sociology
- Software Engineering
- Structural Engineering
- Translation Studies

Associate programs:

- Accounting
- Civil Construction
- Computer Technology
- Early Childhood Education

=== Faculty ===
As of 2024, the BIHE operates through the services of over 700 faculty, who are academic and professionals residing in Iran, and a network of affiliated global faculty that support the university through online courses, curriculum development and other services. A significant number of faculty are BIHE graduates.

At the outset, the administrators and faculty of BIHE were mainly Baháʼí professors dismissed from Iranian universities after the 1979 Islamic Revolution. Other faculty members included doctors, dentists, lawyers and engineers many of whom were fired from their jobs by the Iranian authorities following the Islamic revolution. The university also drew on the expertise of a small and anonymous group of Baháʼí academics in North America, Europe and Australia, who sent the latest textbooks and research papers, occasionally made visits to Iran as guest lecturers, and otherwise provided instructional and technical support.

With the expansion of the online capabilities of the BIHE over the past decade or so, the university has also been assisted by a large and growing number of volunteer professors from around the world who form its Affiliated Global Faculty (AGF).

Although catering to the Baháʼí community of Iran, the BIHE is hardly an exclusively Baháʼí institution. Non-Baháʼí Iranians both inside the country and as part of the university's AGF network have worked with the BIHE and contributed to its success.

Almost all of the professors and administrative staff of BIHE are volunteers who serve without receiving payment.

=== Graduates ===
In Iran, the BIHE graduates have attracted the praise of their employers in private corporations. Some of them have achieved high rank in the organizations, and some have contributed greatly to the social and economic enhancement of their community and Iranian society. Outside of Iran, certain BIHE graduates are currently working as professors and researchers in the academic and professional fields.

The vast majority of the graduates of the BIHE who have continued their education at Master's and PhD levels in other countries, have chosen to return to Iran to teach at BIHE or support it other ways. Some of them have later faced persecution such as imprisonment for their affiliation with the BIHE.

BIHE students and graduates also have published papers in distance learning technologies, materials science, biology, and computer science and civil engineering.

Fariba Kamalabadi and Vahid Tizfahm, two members of the arrested leadership in Iran, among the Baháʼís are graduates of BIHE.

== Reputation and international recognition ==
The New York Times calls the BIHE "an elaborate act of communal self-preservation." The BIHE has received praise as one of the few examples of community-sponsored higher education service in a closed society, a non-violent, adaptive and constructive form of resistance against oppression and an example of empowerment through education. It is believed that the BIHE can offer many lessons to organizations and activists tackling similar types of exclusion in closed societies across the world. The effectiveness of BIHE to deliver curricula has been studied, finding it to be a "social space" that enables Baháʼí students and staff to remain academically and socially engaged; to bond and share with peers and colleagues equally suffering from religious persecution; and to live up to principles such as learning, community service, and resistance in times of socio-political marginalization as well surviving because of international support, community sacrifices, and individual resiliency.

Although BIHE degrees are not certified by the Iranian regime, since 1998 more than 80 universities in the North America, Europe, Australia and Asia have accepted BIHE qualifications and have admitted its graduates directly into programs of study at the masters and doctoral levels.

The BIHE was the first Iranian member of the Open Courseware Consortium and BIHE developed and implemented a project through them out of MIT.

In October 2022 BIHE was awarded LiberPress prize in Spain for its "commendable effort in providing higher education to thousands of Baha'i youth who are deprived of education in 'their own country'". This award has been given every year since 1999 to institutions, organizations and individuals who have tried to deepen the culture of solidarity, shared responsibility and human values.

== Pressure and attacks ==
Iranian authorities have continuously sought to disrupt the BIHE's operation by raiding hundreds of Baháʼí homes and offices associated with it, by confiscating university materials and property and by arresting and imprisoning faculty members and administration staff.

Between 1987 and 2005 the Iranian authorities closed down the university several times as part of the pattern of suppressing the Baháʼí community.

Between September 30 and October 3, 1998, immediately after the first batch of BIHE graduates got admitted into Master's level studies in a Canadian University, members of the Iranian Government's intelligence agency, the Ministry of Information, started a large-scale crackdown, when officials raided over 500 Baháʼí homes, confiscated teaching materials and arrested more than 36 faculty members. Those who had been arrested were asked, while in custody, to sign a document declaring that the BIHE had ceased to exist and that they would no longer cooperate with it. They refused to sign any such declaration. Most of those who were arrested were released soon afterwards, but four were given prison sentence ranging from three to 10 years. The faculty, administrators and the students were all determined to continue the pursuit of knowledge against all odds.

In 2001 and 2002, three classrooms used by community members were seized, and an instructor was summoned to the intelligence agency. Authorities also disrupted – in July 2002 – BIHE qualification examinations in eight different locations simultaneously, videotaping proceedings, interviewing students, and confiscating examination papers and Baháʼí books, thus demonstrating that the government pursues an established policy of intimidation.

Another centrally orchestrated series of raids was carried out on the homes of some of the faculty members and administrators during 22–24 May 2011. Officials from the Ministry of Intelligence entered the homes of at least 30 of the academic staff of the BIHE, seizing books, computers and personal effects. The buildings used as laboratories and for academic purposes in Tehran have also been closed. The searches or arrests took place in Tehran, Zahedan, Sari, Isfahan and Shiraz. A total of 16 educators were arrested. A second wave of arrests in September 2014 targeted few other professors. Some of those arrested were released within a couple of weeks. The rest were put on trial, accused of "conspiracy against national security" and "conspiracy against the Islamic Republic of Iran", and sentenced to four to five years of imprisonment. Today, a number of them have been released after finishing the terms of their sentences, while others remain in jail.

The Iran Daily, an official government newspaper, reported that "The BIHE university was a cover for the propagation of the Baha'i faith and was used to trap citizens in the Baha'i spy network and to gather information from within the county". It stated that ""Authorities have discovered Baha'i propaganda, CDs and books in the possession of those who have been arrested." Spokesman for Iran's mission to the United Nations said the raids on BIHE were because it "systematically controlled activities of cult members, and ... interfered in their private, social and economic lives." He also said the organization had the aim of "entrapping" non-Baha'is, in order to eventually create "an extremist cult movement." See Political accusations against the Baha'i Faith.

Teachers and staff of the BIHE have vowed to continue the BIHE's activities.

== International support and campaigns ==
The attempts of the Iranian government to exclude Bahaʼis from higher education and the raids on the BIHE have drawn considerable international attention to the government of Iran's oppressive policies against Bahaʼis. International Human rights organizations such as entities at the United Nations have called for an end to religious discrimination against Bahaʼi students and various governments have pressed Iran to allow Bahaʼis back into university.

Following the 1990s raids the Canadian Association of University Teachers condemned them.

Since the raids in 2011, there has been further and more diverse objections to the attempts of the Iranian government to exclude Baháʼís from high education. Nobel Peace Prize laureates Archbishop Desmond Tutu and East Timor president José Ramos-Horta signed an open letter calling on Iran to unconditionally drop the charges against the Baha'i educators. Christian Solidarity Worldwide and the Union of Jewish Students urged Iran to end its discriminatory educational policies of Baháʼís. Senator Remeo Dallaire of Canada warned of the "genocidal intent of the Iranian state." Lloyd Axworthy, president of the University of Winnipeg, and Allan Rock, president of the University of Ottawa, published an editorial calling attention to Iran's recent actions. An international set of 43 academic theologians and philosophers – of Christian, Hindu, Jewish, and Muslim backgrounds – signed an open letter, published in The Daily Telegraph (UK), and reported in the Folha de S.Paulo (Brazil) condemning the attacks in 2011. A petition in India has garnered support from members of Judicial, Executive and Legislative branches of government, academics, religious leaders, NGOs and business leaders. Another in the States garnered support from 48 Deans and Senior Vice-presidents of American medical schools. The chief signatory – Dr. Philip Pizzo, Dean of Stanford University School of Medicine – helped collect the signatures at the annual meeting of the Association of American Medical Colleges' Council of Medical School Deans. In March 2012, the American Physical Society Committee on International Freedom of Scientists reiterated its 2010 support for Baháʼí students not being denied education in requesting the arrested lectures be released.

=== Education is Not a Crime ===
"Education is Not a Crime" was a worldwide campaign launched in November 2014 by Maziar Bahari, an Iranian filmmaker and journalist to draw attention to the Iranian government's systematic denial of university education to young Baha'is. The campaign was inspired by Bahari's documentary film To Light a Candle, which was premiered in London in September 2014. Through personal stories, interviews and rare footage, the film unveils decades of social injustice and religious intolerance against the Baha'i community of Iran.

Grassroots screenings of the film and panel discussions have been part of "Education Is Not a Crime" campaign and its website featured voices of support from people around the world. The campaign had a global day of action on 27 February 2015 in which a major event titled "Education is not a crime Live 2015" was organized in Los Angeles along with hundreds of other screenings around the world.

Nobel Peace laureates such as Archbishop Desmond Tutu, Shirin Ebadi, Tawakkol Karman, Jody Williams, and Mairead Maguire have endorsed the campaign. It has also received support from a number of artists and intellectuals including Nazanin Boniadi, Abbas Milani, Mohsen Makhmalbaf, Azar Nafisi, Omid Djalili, Eva LaRue, Mohammad Maleki, former president of the University of Tehran and Mark Ruffalo.

=== Education Under Fire ===
Following developments reported on October 13, 2011, by the UN Secretary General with a report on "The situation of human rights in the Islamic Republic of Iran", specifically citing the raids, Nobel Laureates Desmond Tutu and José Ramos-Horta wrote an open letter calling for the immediate release of the Baháʼí Institute for Higher Education professors and other initiatives which is part of a program of action that is called Education Under Fire (EUF).

Single Arrow Productions produced a 30-minute documentary by the same title, Education Under Fire. This documentary traces the Islamic Republic of Iran's three-decade-long policy of denying the members of its Bahá´í community basic human rights including the right to attend any institution of higher education. It is endorsed by Amnesty International. The documentary and laureates' letter together form part of university and community activities to address the situation. The campaign's premiere event showing the documentary was co-hosted by faculty from Columbia University, Duke University, and Eastern Kentucky University, as well as Amnesty International and the director of the International Campaign for Human Rights in Iran, on October 28, 2011. A "successful" Kickstarter campaign associated with the documentary was completed and Iran Human Rights held a podcast on the initiative in November 2011.

The documentary was shown at the mid-February 2012 12th Annual Bellingham Human Rights Film Festival and the 10th Annual University of San Francisco Film Festival in late March.

==== Goals ====
The campaign's stated goals are:

- calling on the government of the Iranian Republic to release unconditionally and drop charges against the BIHE educators currently under arrest and facing charges related to their educational activities;
- asks academic leaders, administrators and professors to register through any possible channels in the Iranian academic community their disagreement with and disapproval of any policy which would bar individuals from higher education based on their religious background or political persuasion, or which would remove or corrupt any established fields of study from a university curricula for religious or political reasons
- to encourage universities to review the educational quality of the BIHE coursework for possible acceptance of its credits, so that those who have had the benefit of its programs can continue at higher levels of study, and
- to offer available online university level curricula, through scholarships if needed, to students in Iran who would otherwise be deprived of the right to higher education or who, due to government limitation on social sciences, would not have a full array of educational options available to them in their own county.

Head administrators of Wheelock, Wheaton Colleges and the University of Massachusetts Amherst as well as faculty from various Canadian and Australian colleges and universities have signed letters in support of the cause of the campaign which have been released to the public. Screenings of the documentary often with discussions and action agenda items for the campaign have been held or are scheduled for 2012 at a wide number of universities and colleges in the United States, Canada, and Italy. The documentary was also shown at a public library in Shrewsbury, New Jersey, and City Hall at Stratford, Ontario and the Ohio Commission on Hispanic / Latino Affairs hosted an event in Columbus Ohio. The American Friends Service Committee supported two screenings – one at the DePaul University Art Museum, and the other at Northeastern Illinois University's Student Union. David Docherty, President of Mount Royal University recommended the documentary. A Sentinel Project for Genocide Prevention contributor spoke at a screening and discussion in Toronto on the campaign and situation in Iran. The Human Rights, Social Justice and Canadian Complicity with Torture – Criminology and Human Rights Symposium of St. Thomas University in March 2012 hosted a screening and discussion.

The campaign has also received televised local news coverage in New York (WNBC), Miami (WTVJ) as well as Houston community radio (KPFT).

=== Can you solve this? ===
Another response to the situation was using QR codes for the website "Can you solve this?" (can-you-solve-this.org) It is an online email campaign system to send letters about the situation to various leaders in several countries was started in August 2011. A related website claims it has sent over 1,700 letters with coverage from the Mashable website. Promoted on the website bahairights.org, the Muslim Network for Baha'i Rights, it is a project by Mideast Youth.

== Films about BIHE ==
BIHE has been a source of inspiration and subject of a few films. "Education Under Fire" is a documentary produced by Single Arrow Productions and co-sponsored by Amnesty International, which profiles the growth, struggle, and spirit of the BIHE. "To Light a Candle" is another documentary film by journalist Maziar Bahari, premiered in 2014, which focuses on the stories of the individuals associated with the attempted shutdown of BIHE. "CopyRight" is a fiction 16mm short film based on the story of volunteers at the BIHE.

There are also references to BIHE in other documentary films. For instance, Iranian Taboo, a 2011 documentary film by Dutch film-maker Reza Allamehzadeh, which focuses on the persecution of Baháʼís in Iran, has some references to BIHE.

== See also ==
- Persecution of Baháʼís
- Political accusations against the Baha'i Faith
- To Light a Candle (film)
- Iranian Taboo
