= Reza Allamehzadeh =

Iranian-born Dutch filmmaker

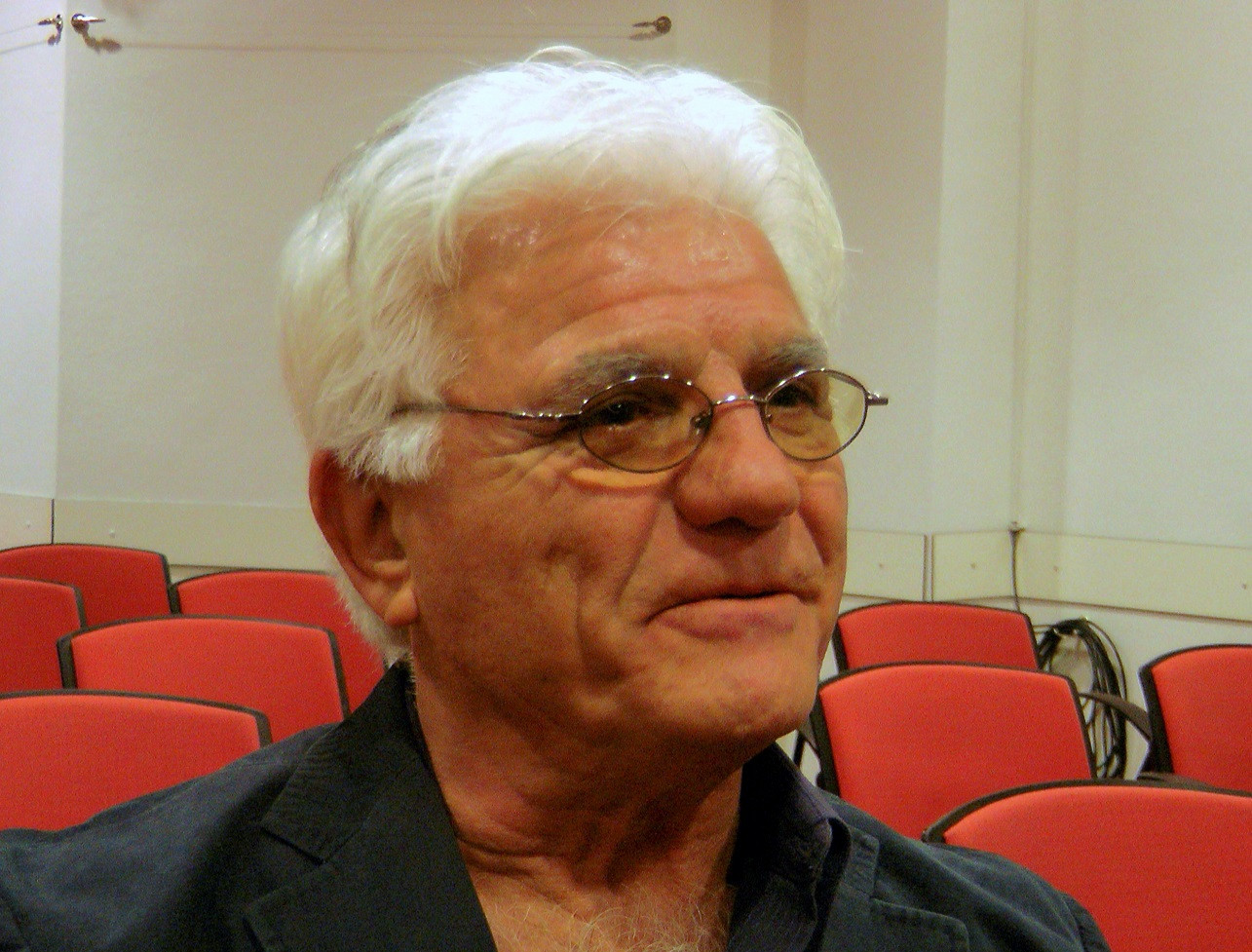
- Born: November 27, 1943 (age 82); Sari, Iran
- Years active: 1969–present

Reza Allamehzadeh (Persian: رضا علامه‌زاده) is an Iranian-born Dutch filmmaker, film critic and writer who lives in the Netherlands. He is primarily known for his films about refugees, such as The Guests of Hotel Astoria (1988), and the documentary Holy Crime (1994), about the murder of opposition figures in Europe by the Islamic regime in Iran.

Allamehzadeh was born in 1943 in Sari, Mazandaran province, Iran. He studied film directing at “Tehran Academy of Film and Television” from 1966 to 1969. Along with filmmaking, he writes and publishes children's books, novels, and short stories. He teaches film and TV courses at various universities including Hollins University in Virginia (US), Leeds Metropolitan University (UK), and International R/TV Training Center in the Netherlands, where he has been living since 1983.

Allamehzadeh has been one of the advocates of Kurdish cinema. He is native in Persian and fluent in English and to some extent Dutch and Spanish. After fleeing to Europe where he still resides, Allamehzadeh has been making a number of films.

Reza Allamehzadeh was banned from entering Iran at the time of writing Iranian Taboo; recruited the help of friends who secretly shot inside Iran to investigate the centuries-old ban on the Baha'i Faith. All of the sequences in Iran were shot undercover by the filmmaker's local connections. In the film, he focuses his attention on the history of persecution faced by Iran's Bahá’í minority, puzzling over the fact that even those Iranians who believe Bahá’ís should be granted their rights often choose to remain silent about the matter — hence the film's title. "Despite being barred from entering my hometown, I was able to film deep within Iran with the help of dedicated friends who risked their lives to capture the material I needed," Mr. Allamehzadeh stated.

== Works ==
=== Films ===
- 1972 - The devotee
- 1972 - Ghadir
- 1973 - The Witness (short)
- 1973 - Daar (short)
- 1973 - The Trap, awarded Grand Prix at 12th International Film Festival for Children and Youth in Gijon, Spain.
- 1979 - Speak Up, Turkmen (Documentary short)
- 1980 - The Wise Little Black Fish (Documentary)
- 1981 - Shat o sharji (Documentary short)
- 1981 - Agha-ye bimei (Short)
- 1982 - Naghsh (Short)
- 1986 - A Few Simple Sentences, awarded best short, Stockholm 1986, International Immigrant Film Festival; best children's film, Tomar 1987, International Festival of Cinema for Children and Youth; best children's film, International Centre of Films for Children and Youth (CIFEJ), International Moscow Film Festival, 1987.
- 1988 - The Guests of Hotel Astoria, feature length, selected for the Venice, Moscow, Montreal and Chicago Film Festivals.
- 1989 - The Night After the Revolution (Documentary)
- 1990 - A Nation on Two Wheels (Documentary short)
- 1991 - We Are Gypsies (Documentary)
- 1994 - Holy Crime, a controversial documentary on state terrorism of Islamic government of Iran in European countries.
- 1997 - The Wave Is at Rest (Documentary)
- 1997 - Manuscripts don't burn (Documentary)
- 2011 - Iranian Taboo, a documentary on the Baha'i community in and outside Iran.
- 2014 - Tell Me of the Seas (Documentary)
- 2020 - Tales of the corona days (Short)

=== Other Works/Publications ===
- Reza, Allamehzadeh (2012). Ghook. H&S Media. p. 292. ISBN 978-1-780-83195-4.
- Reza, Allamehzadeh (2012). Bitter Summer: Tabestan-E Talkh. H&S Media. p. 226. ISBN 978-1-780-83196-1.
- Reza, Allamehzadeh (2012). Private Album: Albom-E Khosoosi. H&S Media. p. 192. ISBN 978-1-780-83197-8.

== Awards/Recognition ==
- 1973, Winner in the Short Film Awards for Daar Gijón International Film Festival
- 1989, Nominee: Best Feature Award for Guests of Hotel Astoria at the Chicago International Film Festival
- 1989, Night After the Revolution Melbourne International Film Festival

== See also ==
- Persian cinema
