= Iranian Taboo =

- Film poster
- Persian: تابوی ایرانی
- Directed by: Reza Allamehzadeh
- Produced by: Mansour Taeed & Bijan Shahmoradi
- Release date: December 4, 2011
- Country: Iran
- Language: Persian

Iranian Taboo (Persian: تابوی ایرانی) is a 2011 documentary film by Iranian filmmaker Reza Allamehzadeh about the persecution of Baháʼís in Iran. It was selected for the 2012 Dawn Breakers International Film Festival as well as the Newport Beach and Uninvited Film Festivals.
