= Ibrahim George Kheiralla =

- إبراهيم جورج خير الله
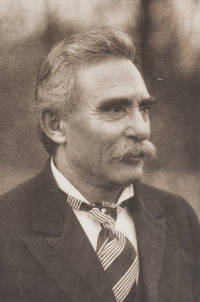
- Kheiralla around 1896
- Born: 11 November 1849; Mount Lebanon, Sidon Eyalet of Beirut, Ottoman Empire
- Died: 6 March 1929 (aged 79); Beirut, Lebanon

Ibrahim George Kheiralla (11 November 1849 - 6 March 1929; Arabic: إبراهيم جورج خير الله), born in the Sidon Eyalet of Beirut of the Ottoman Empire, was a co-founder of the first American Baháʼí community, along with Anton Haddad. He was born to a Christian family in a village on Mount Lebanon in 1849 and later studied at the Syrian Protestant College in Beirut.

== Conversion and emigration ==
Ibrahim George Kheiralla converted to the Baháʼí Faith while living in Egypt in 1889 when he met Hájí ʻAbdu'l-Karím-i-Tihrání. Kheiralla went through Europe and eventually came to the United States in late 1892 where he joined Anton Haddad, the first Baháʼí to come to America. Initially, Kheiralla settled in New York. He visited Charles Augustus Briggs and others, as well as the Syrian community in New York.

In 1894 Kheiralla moved on to Chicago following the interest fostered by the World's Columbian Exposition's World Parliament of Religions. In Chicago he taught "Truth Seeker" classes. One of the early converts while Kheiralla was in Chicago was Thornton Chase, who had read the presentation about the Baháʼís at the Exposition, and is generally considered the first Baháʼí convert in the West. Other individuals had converted, but none remained members of the religion. Researcher Robert Stockman considers Chase's importance as an early North American Baháʼí thinker, publicist, administrator, and organizer is still underappreciated and that in many ways Chase's death left a gap in the North American Baháʼí community that remained unfilled until the rise to prominence in the early 1920s of Horace Holley, the chief developer of Baháʼí organization in the United States and Canada. Another to join the religion from Kheiralla's early classes was Howard MacNutt, who would later compile The Promulgation of Universal Peace, a prominent collection of the addresses of ʻAbdu'l-Bahá during his journeys in America. Both men were designated as "Disciples of ʻAbdu'l-Bahá" and "Heralds of the Covenant" by Shoghi Effendi. Another student of the classes and Disciple was Lua Getsinger, designated as the "mother teacher of the West". Another who "passed" the class and joined the religion was the maverick Honoré Jackson. Kheiralla moved once again, to Kenosha, Wisconsin, in 1895, where a large Baháʼí community soon developed.

Because of his success promulgating the Baháʼí Faith in North America, ʻAbdu'l-Bahá titled Kheiralla "Bahá's Peter," "the Second Columbus" and "Conqueror of America." ʻAbdu'l-Bahá would write a Tablet to Ibráhím George Kheiralla.

== Pilgrimage and return to America ==
In 1898, Kheiralla undertook a Baháʼí pilgrimage to Palestine to meet ʻAbdu'l-Bahá with other American pilgrims, including Phoebe Hearst, Lua Getsinger and May Boles. In Akka, Kheiralla witnessed first hand the conflict between ʻAbdu'l-Bahá and his brothers. Upon his return to America in 1899, Kheiralla began to announce his avowed leadership of Western Baháʼís independent of ʻAbdu'l-Bahá and authored a book, Beha'u'llah, wherein he states his belief that ʻAbdu'l-Bahá was equal in rank to his brothers Mírzá Muhammad ʻAlí, Ḍíyáʼu'lláh, and Badiʻu'lláh. Early after the return to America, ʻAbdu'l-Bahá sent, first, Anton Haddad with a letter contesting the definition of leadership, then Kheiralla's initial teacher of the religion, ʻAbdu'l-Karím-i-Tihrání, to confront him. The conflict made the newspapers. Ultimately, in the conflict between ʻAbdu'l-Bahá and Mírzá Muhammad ʻAlí, Kheiralla sided with the latter for which he was declared a Covenant-breaker.

Kheiralla would go on to form the "Society of Behaists," which would later be led by Shua Ullah Behai and eventually become defunct. Kheiralla had three children, two daughters who were named Nabeeha and Labiba, and a son named George Ibrahim Kheirallah who converted to Islam in the 1930s, becoming active in the Islamic Society of New York, and translated and published some poems of Khalil Gibran. Ibrahim George Kheiralla died in 1929.

== Works ==
- Behá 'U'lláh (The Glory of God), with Howard McNutt. 1 ed., Vol. 2. 545. Chicago: I. G. Kheiralla Publisher, 1900. 2nd. ed. Chicago, Goodspeed Press, 1915, 545.
- Facts for Behaists by Ibrahim George Kheiralla 1849-1930, Chicago: I.G. Kheiralla, 1901.
- O Christians! Why do you believe not in Christ? 192. Chicago: Goodspeed Press, 1917.
- Za-ti-et Al-lah: The Identity and Personality of God by Ibrahim George Kheiralla, Chicago: 1896.
- Bab-ed-Din, the Door of True Religion: Za-ti-et Al-lah, El Fi-Da: Revelation From the East: Rational Argument by Ibrahim George Kheiralla, Chicago: C.H. Kerr, 1897.
- The Three Questions by Ibrahim George Kheiralla.
- An Epistle of Peace. Chicago: National Association of the Universal Religion,1918 by Ibrahim George Kheiralla. Michigan, 2004.
- Kheiralla, Ibrahim G. Universal Peace and Its Sole Solution. 18. n.p. [Evanston, Ill.]: n.d. [1914]. Collins 12.56.
- Behaism: In Reply to the Attacks of Robert P. Richardson. Open Court 29 (October 1915): 633-40.
- Ninety-Five Questions and Answers Concerning the Teachings of the Behai Religion, Which Is Organized as the Universal Religion of the World. 14. Kenosha, Wis.: Dr. Ibrahim G. Kheiralla, 1925. Collins 12.52.
- Kheiralla, Ibrahim G. Immortality: Hereafter of Man's Soul and Mind: Man Never Dies. 32. New York: Syrian-American Press, 1928. Collins 12.49.
- Kheiralla, Ibrahim G. Miracles. 24. Newark, N.J.: W. E. Dreyer, 1943. Collins 12.51.
- Proof of the Existence and Immortality of the Soul From a Scientific and Logical Standpoint; The Mind, as Taught by the Society of Behaist’s, by Ibrahim G. Kheiralla, Newark, N.J., 1943.
- Reincarnation: The Return of the Soul. 24. Newark, N.J.: W. E. Dreyer, 1944. This appears differently in Collins 12.80, where it is anon., but notes that it 'includes an essay by I.G. Kheiralla'. He has 1943 and 23 pp. Title as 'Reincarnation, or the Return of the Soul'.
- Kheiralla, Ibrahim G. The Creator and What it Takes to Win the Peace. Newark, N.J.: W. E. Dreyer, 1943.
