= Mírzá Muhammad ʻAlí =

Second surviving son of Baháʼu'lláh

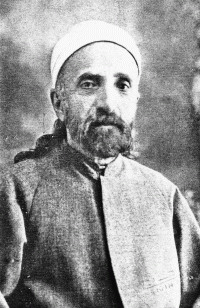
- Born: 16 December 1853; Baghdad, Ottoman Empire
- Died: 10 December 1937 (aged 83); Haifa, Mandatory Palestine
- Children: Shua Ullah Behai; Amin Ullah Bahai; Mousa (Musa) Bahai
- Parents: Baháʼu'lláh (father); Fatimih (mother)

Mírzá Muhammad ʻAlí (Persian: میرزا محمد علی 16 December 1853 – 10 December 1937) was the second surviving son of Baháʼu'lláh, the founder of the Baháʼí Faith, and the first from Baháʼu'lláh's second wife Fatimih. He is well known for an attempted schism in which he claimed leadership over his half-brother ʻAbdu'l-Bahá, and was rejected by the overwhelming majority of Baháʼís, who regard him as a Covenant-breaker. The only result of his unsuccessful leadership attempt was to alienate most of the family of Baháʼu'lláh from ʻAbdu'l-Bahá. His schism was short lived and no longer exists; by the 1960s his descendants had largely melded into Muslim society and had no collective religious life.

Muhammad ʻAlí was born in Baghdad among the group of Iranians exiled from Iran for their adherence to the Bábí Faith. He would follow the family into further exiles into Istanbul, Edirne, and `Akka. As a teenager in Edirne, he began transcribing the writings of Baháʼu'lláh, and attempted his own claim to divine revelation, for which he was publicly chastised by his father. He gradually developed a jealousy of his half-brother ʻAbdu'l-Bahá, who was nine years his senior and widely respected.

Baháʼu'lláh's Kitáb-i-ʻAhd appointed ʻAbdu'l-Bahá to be his successor in leadership to the Baháʼí community, and named Muhammad ʻAlí as being "beneath" and "after" ʻAbdu'l-Bahá, which was widely interpreted as a line of succession. After Baháʼu'lláh's death in 1892, Muhammad ʻAlí accepted the appointment of ʻAbdu'l-Bahá but soon began to discredit and obstruct his brother. After four years, the covert opposition became a campaign of open hostility, including forged documents and spurious complaints to the Turkish authorities that put ʻAbdu'l-Bahá back into confinement. Muhammad ʻAlí was cast out of the Baháʼí community, and shunned.

ʻAbdu'l-Bahá's own Will and Testament labeled him as, "The Center of Sedition, the Prime Mover of mischief", and instead of following the line of succession in the Kitáb-i-ʻAhd, ʻAbdu'l-Bahá appointed Shoghi Effendi as the first "Guardian" of the religion. Muhammad ʻAlí took the opportunity of ʻAbdu'l-Bahá's death in 1921 to revive his claim to leadership and tried to seize the Baha'i properties in the Haifa/Akka area, but was ultimately unsuccessful. He died in 1937 with very few supporters.

== Opposition to ʻAbdu'l-Bahá ==
In his handwritten will and testament, the Kitáb-i-ʻAhd, Baháʼu'lláh formally appointed his eldest son, ʻAbdu'l-Bahá, as his successor and instructed his followers to turn to him after Baháʼu'lláh's death. The document, which was read publicly shortly after Baháʼu'lláh died in 1892, also placed Mírzá Muhammad ʻAlí, Baháʼu'lláh's second surviving son, in a position subordinate to ʻAbdu'l-Bahá.

Following Baháʼu'lláh's death, the great majority of Baháʼís recognized ʻAbdu'l-Bahá as the head of the community, the authorized interpreter of Baháʼu'lláh's writings, and the Centre of the Covenant. Muhammad ʻAlí, ʻAbdu'l-Bahá's half-brother, acted contrary to the will, rejected ʻAbdu'l-Bahá's authority, and began opposing him, initially in secret and later after openly. After four years, the covert opposition became a campaign of open hostility. Although this opposition did not undermine the loyalty of the wider Baháʼí community, it created difficulties for ʻAbdu'l-Bahá in his relations with the Ottoman authorities.

Muhammad ʻAlí and his associates sought to discredit ʻAbdu'l-Bahá before the Ottoman authorities by portraying him as politically disloyal and a potential source of unrest. Their campaign included forged documents and spurious complaints to the authorities, which resulted in renewed scrutiny, surveillance, restrictions, and confinement in ʻAkká. At one point, the authorities considered exiling ʻAbdu'l-Bahá to North Africa, but the proposed exile was not carried out. He remained under confinement until the Young Turk Revolution of 1908 resulted in an amnesty for political and religious prisoners of the Ottoman Empire.

Several members of Baháʼu'lláh's family, his former amanuensis Mírzá Áqá Ján, and Ibrahim George Kheiralla were among those who supported Muhammad ʻAlí in his opposition to ʻAbdu'l-Bahá. Kheiralla was a Christian from Ottoman Syria who converted to the Baháʼí Faith. He subsequently emigrated to the United States and played an important role in establishing the religion there. Kheiralla initially presented the Baháʼí teachings through a strongly Christian framework and identified ʻAbdu'l-Bahá with the return of Christ. ʻAbdu'l-Bahá rejected this identification and sought to correct Kheiralla's presentation of the religion. Kheiralla later broke with ʻAbdu'l-Bahá and aligned himself with Muhammad ʻAlí. In 1904, Muhammad ʻAlí sent his son Shua Ullah Behai to the United States to support Kheiralla and his followers.

Kheiralla's alignment with Muhammad ʻAlí and opposition to ʻAbdu'l-Bahá temporarily created uncertainty within the American Baháʼí community, particularly because little accurate information about the religion was then available in English. Between 1900 and 1905, ʻAbdu'l-Bahá sent four Persian Baháʼí teachers to the United States to provide the community with a clearer understanding of Baháʼí beliefs and teachings. He also corresponded extensively with American Baháʼís and later visited North America, speaking about the Baháʼí teachings at public and private gatherings in numerous cities.

Other developments contributed to the consolidation of the American Baháʼí community. A small but influential group of American Baháʼís travelled to ʻAkká to meet ʻAbdu'l-Bahá; a growing body of Baháʼí literature became available in English; and American Baháʼí teachers and community leaders gradually emerged. By 1912, at least seventy English-language books and pamphlets concerning the Baháʼí Faith—including explanations of its teachings and translations of Baháʼí texts—had been published.

A small minority of the early American converts followed Kheiralla and referred to themselves as "Unitarians". Their numbers gradually declined, and by 1906 they consisted of approximately forty adherents in Kenosha, a small group in Chicago, and several individuals elsewhere. Subsequent attempts to expand the movement and attract additional followers were unsuccessful, and the Kenosha group became inactive after 1950. Shua Ullah later assumed leadership of the small group. From 1934 to 1937, he edited and published the English-language periodical Behai Quarterly, which included writings by Muhammad ʻAlí, Kheiralla, and other members of the movement.

The prolonged opposition led ʻAbdu'l-Bahá to draw the attention of Baháʼís to the principle of the Covenant. According to this principle, adherence to the authority appointed to direct the community at any given time serves to preserve the unity of the Baháʼí community. ʻAbdu'l-Bahá designated those whom he regarded as having violated the Covenant, including Muhammad ʻAlí, as Covenant-breakers. Although divisions commonly emerged in religious communities following the deaths of their founders, ʻAbdu'l-Bahá, despite sustained opposition from his half-brother, preserved the unity of the main body of the Baháʼí community and prevented the dispute from developing into a significant or lasting schism.

In his will, known as the Will and Testament of ʻAbdu'l-Bahá, ʻAbdu'l-Bahá appointed his eldest grandson, Shoghi Effendi, as his successor. The document also described the activities of Mírzá Muhammad ʻAlí, declared him a Covenant-breaker, and expelled him from the Baháʼí community. Mírzá Muhammad ʻAlí's followers in ʻAkká and the surrounding area consisted of no more than six families. They conducted little distinct religious activity and were eventually largely assimilated into the local Muslim community.

During Shoghi Effendi's ministry, opposition to him remained limited, since the concept of the Covenant had become firmly established as a central principle of the Baháʼí Faith and the Will and Testament of ʻAbdu'l-Bahá was clear and unequivocal. Nevertheless, Mírzá Muhammad ʻAlí initially created difficulties for Shoghi Effendi. He and his associates attempted to take control of Baháʼí holy places. They obtained the keys to the Shrine of Baháʼu'lláh from its custodian, but the local authorities later returned them to Shoghi Effendi. Following ʻAbdu'l-Bahá's death in 1921, Mírzá Muhammad ʻAlí renewed his claim to leadership, but the attempt was unsuccessful.

== See also ==
- Baháʼu'lláh's family
- Covenant of Baháʼu'lláh
