= Kitáb-i-ʻAhd =

The Kitáb-i-ʻAhd (Arabic: ﻛﺘﺎﺏ ﻋﻬﺪﻱ literally "Book of My Covenant") is the Will and Testament of Baháʼu'lláh, the founder of the Baháʼí Faith, where he selects his son ʻAbdu'l-Bahá as his successor. It was written at least one year before Baháʼu'lláh died in 1892. An English translation is included in the Tablets of Baháʼu'lláh Revealed After the Kitáb-i-Aqdas, published in 1978.

While the Tablet of the Branch, composed in the Adrianople period had clearly signaled a high station for "the Branch of Holiness" and the Kitáb-i-Aqdas has specified that this high station involved leadership of the Baháʼí community after Baháʼu'lláh's passing, it was only with the unsealing of the Kitáb-i-ʻAhd after the passing of Baháʼu'lláh in 1892 that it was confirmed that the Branch referred to was indeed ʻAbdu'l-Bahá.

== Designation of Succession ==
In the Kitáb-i-ʻAhd, Baháʼu'lláh refers to his eldest son ʻAbdu'l-Bahá as G͟husn-i-Aʻzam (meaning "Mightiest Branch" or "Mightier Branch") and his second eldest son Mírzá Muhammad ʻAlí as G͟husn-i-Akbar (meaning "Greatest Branch" or "Greater Branch").

Baháʼu'lláh designates his successor with the following verses:

The Will of the divine Testator is this: It is incumbent upon the Aghsán, the Afnán and My Kindred to turn, one and all, their faces towards the Most Mighty Branch. Consider that which We have revealed in Our Most Holy Book: 'When the ocean of My presence hath ebbed and the Book of My Revelation is ended, turn your faces toward Him Whom God hath purposed, Who hath branched from this Ancient Root.' The object of this sacred verse is none other except the Most Mighty Branch [ʻAbdu'l-Bahá]. Thus have We graciously revealed unto you Our potent Will, and I am verily the Gracious, the All-Powerful. Verily God hath ordained the station of the Greater Branch [Muḥammad ʻAlí] to be beneath that of the Most Great Branch [ʻAbdu'l-Bahá]. He is in truth the Ordainer, the All-Wise. We have chosen 'the Greater' after 'the Most Great', as decreed by Him Who is the All-Knowing, the All-Informed.

== See also ==
- Covenant of Baháʼu'lláh
- Will and Testament of ʻAbdu'l-Bahá
- Kitáb-i-Aqdas (The Most Holy Book)

== Notes and references ==
Notes

Citations
