= Book of the Covenant =

The term Book of the Covenant may mean:

- The Torah in its entirety as understood by classical Judaism.
- Books of Covenant – two books in the canon of the Ethiopian Orthodox Church.
- Covenant Code – the name given by academics to a text appearing in the Torah at Exodus 21:2–23:33.
- Kitáb-i-'Ahd – written by Bahá'u'lláh, and part of the text of the Bahá'í Faith.
- The Book of the Covenant mentioned in the Book of Exodus 24:7.
