= Covenant of Baháʼu'lláh =

Primary principle in the Bahá'í Faith

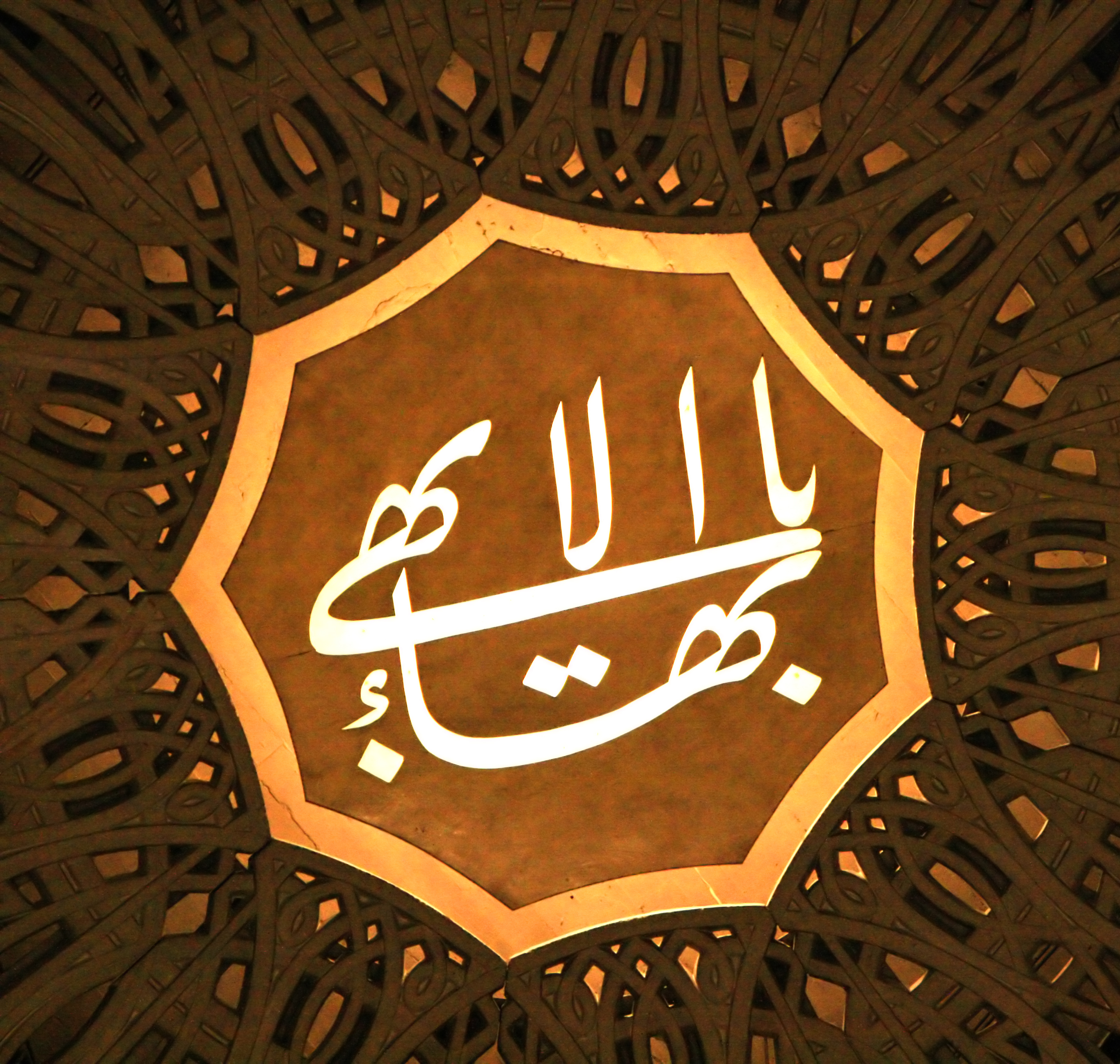
the greatest name.jpg

In the Baháʼí Faith there are two covenants, deemed the 'greater' and 'lesser'. The greater covenant refers to an agreement of progressive revelation: that God will send messengers about every thousand years, and it is humanity's duty to recognize them and respond to their teachings. The lesser covenant is the agreement between the faith's founder, Baháʼu'lláh, and his followers, regarding the succession of leadership and the maintenance of unity.

Succession in the Baháʼí covenant was explicit and in written form, providing a clear chain of authority that led Baháʼís to follow ʻAbdu'l-Bahá as the authorized interpreter of Baháʼí scripture after Baháʼu'lláh's death, and the one who would lead the community. Baháʼu'lláh outlined the Universal House of Justice, a nine-member institution that could legislate on religious matters, and hinted at an appointed role for his descendants, both of which were elaborated upon by ʻAbdu'l-Bahá when he appointed Shoghi Effendi as the Guardian. The Universal House of Justice, first elected in 1963, remains the supreme governing body of the worldwide Baháʼí community. Anyone rejecting a link in this chain of leadership is regarded as a Covenant-breaker.

To Baháʼís, the Covenant of Baháʼu'lláh and its guarantee of unity represents a unique feature of their religion. For example, they regard the successorships of Jesus to Saint Peter and Muhammad to Ali as unwritten attempts to maintain unity that ultimately failed as their religions broke into contending factions. Through the covenant, the Baháʼí Faith prevented schism, and the several attempts to form alternative leadership have failed to attract a sizeable following due to their lack of scriptural authority.

== Greater covenant ==
The greater covenant refers to the covenant all messengers from God make with their followers regarding the next messenger God will send for them. According to Bahá'u'lláh, the founder of the Bahá'í Faith, God promises to always send divine teachers to instruct humankind in a process known as progressive revelation. Bahá'ís believe prophecies pertaining to God's greater covenant are found in the scriptures of all religions, and each messenger from God specifically prophesies about the next one to come. For their part in the greater covenant, the followers of each religion have a duty to investigate with an open mind whether a person who claims to be the promised messenger of their faith does, or does not, spiritually fulfill relevant prophecies.

=== Manifestations of God ===
Bahá'ís conceive of God as a unique, eternal Being, the omnipotent omniscient creator of everything. Though infinitely exalted above his creation, God's loving will for it is faithfully conveyed to intelligent beings through a series of prophets or divine messengers referred to by Bahá'ís as Manifestations of God. In expressing God's will for this world they reveal social and spiritual principles and laws which educate human beings according to their capacities and the specific needs of the time and place in which each manifestation appears. As intermediaries between God and humanity what these divine teachers gave to people, over time, became the foundations for what are now known as the world's major religions.

Bahá'u'lláh says manifestations of God have a dual nature, both divine and human. Though not incarnations of God, they also are not ordinary mortals. Bahá'u'lláh likens all manifestations to pure polished mirrors created by God to perfectly reflect his knowledge and attributes in order to clearly manifest the Creator's will through prescriptive teachings they give to this world:

"... [God] hath ordained that in every age and dispensation a pure and stainless Soul be made manifest in the kingdoms of earth and heaven. Unto this subtle, this mysterious and ethereal Being He hath assigned a twofold nature; the physical, pertaining to the world of matter, and the spiritual, which is born of the substance of God Himself. He hath, moreover, conferred upon Him a double station. The first station, which is related to His innermost reality, representeth Him as One Whose voice is the voice of God Himself. ... The second station is the human station... These Essences of Detachment, these resplendent Realities are the channels of God's all-pervasive grace."

=== Progressive revelation ===
Progressive revelation, a core teaching of the Bahá'í Faith, holds that religious truth is revealed by God progressively throughout history by his sending a series of divine manifestations, in fulfillment of God's promise in the greater covenant. This never-ending process was described by the Báb, one of the two manifestations of the Bahá'í Faith, in this way:

"The Lord of the universe hath never raised up a prophet nor hath He sent down a Book unless He hath established His covenant with all men, calling for their acceptance of the next Revelation and of the next Book; inasmuch as the outpourings of His bounty are ceaseless and without limit."

Each manifestation of God brings a measure of revelation tailored to the population of the time and place in which he appears. Differences between revelations are not considered dependent upon the knowledge of a particular manifestation, but are instead attributed to various societal needs and factors reflecting the "conditions" and "varying requirements of the age" and the "spiritual capacity" of those being taught. By means of this school of divine guidance, humans have gradually evolved to achieve ever-widening circles of unity involving families, tribes, city-states, and most recently nations. Based on this concept, Bahá'ís accept the divine origin of all the world's major religions and see them as different stages of one great educational process ordained by God. Bahá'ís also believe Bahá'u'lláh is the most recent manifestation sent by God, and through the application of his teachings the human race will finally attain its collective maturity.

=== Prophecy ===
The nature and promise of God's greater covenant with all people is a key component of religious literature, expressed in both prophecies and mentioned by the divine teachers themselves.

Bahá'ís accept the Báb as fulfilling Islamic prophecies for the return of the Mahdi foretold by Muhammad; and see in Bahá'u'lláh the symbolic fulfillment of messianic and related eschatological prophecies of major world religions and groups. These include, for Judaism, the incarnation of the "Everlasting Father" from the Yuletide prophecy of Isaiah 9:6, the "Lord of Hosts"; for Christianity, the "Spirit of Truth" or "Comforter" predicted by Jesus in his farewell discourse of John 14-17 and the return of Christ "in the glory of the Father"; for Zoroastrianism, the return of Shah Bahram Varjavand; for Shi'a Islam the return of the Third Imam, Imam Husayn; for Sunni Islam, the return of Jesus, Isa; and for the Bábí Faith, He whom God shall make manifest. Bahá'ís also identify the advent of Bahá'u'lláh as fulfilling for "Hindus the reincarnation of Krishna", and for Buddhists the coming of the "fifth Buddha".

=== Obligations ===
Bahá'u'lláh teaches that individuals have a two-fold obligation to fulfill in response to God's promise to continually send messengers. The first is to recognize and accept the new manifestation when he comes, the second is to obey and put into practice the new teachings he brings; Bahá'u'lláh describes these twin duties are inseparable. In his Book of Laws he says:

The first duty prescribed by God for His servants is the recognition of Him Who is the Day Spring of His Revelation and the Fountain of His laws, Who representeth the Godhead in both the Kingdom of His Cause and the world of creation. Whoso achieveth this duty hath attained unto all good... It behoveth every one who reacheth this most sublime station, this summit of transcendent glory, to observe every ordinance of Him Who is the Desire of the world. These twin duties are inseparable. Neither is acceptable without the other.

As God fulfills His greater covenant through the process of progressive revelation, Bahá'u'lláh declares in his Book of Certitude that the Lord also tests the purity of heart and sincerity of those who claim to be devoted followers of a former manifestation whenever a new one appears. Such testing is done in various ways that make clear whether individuals are spiritually attuned enough to recognize God speaking through a new manifestation, or if they reject him by blindly clinging to traditions and misinterpretations of spiritual reality promoted by clergy.

Based on the fact that all manifestations speak for the same God, Bahá'u'lláh also points out that rejecting any one of God's manifestations is the same as rejecting them all: "Be thou assured in thyself that verily, he who turns away from this Beauty hath also turned away from the Messengers of the past and showeth pride towards God from all eternity to all eternity."

== Lesser Covenant ==
To differentiate it from God's eternal greater covenant with humankind, Bahá'ís refer to a manifestation's agreement with his followers regarding whom they should turn to and obey immediately after his death as the lesser covenant.

Two distinctive features of the Bahá'í lesser covenant, which is referred to within the Bahá'í Faith as the Covenant of Bahá'u'lláh, are that it is explicit and also conveyed in authenticated written documents. This covenant is a means of protection from ideological splits. Since Bahá'u'lláh's specific divine mission is to bring about world unity, securing the lasting unity of his religion is the guarantee of achieving that goal. 'Abdu'l-Bahá, Bahá'u'lláh's eldest son, explains:

The first condition is firmness in the Covenant of God. For the power of the Covenant will protect the Cause of Bahá'u'lláh from the doubts of the people of error. It is the fortified fortress of the Cause of God and the firm pillar of the religion of God. Today no power can conserve the oneness of the Bahá'í world save the Covenant of God; otherwise differences like unto a most great tempest will encompass the Bahá'í world. It is evident that the axis of the oneness of the world of humanity is the power of the Covenant and nothing else. Had the Covenant not come to pass, had it not been revealed from the Supreme Pen and had not the Book of the Covenant, like unto the ray of the Sun of Reality, illuminated the world, the forces of the Cause of God would have been utterly scattered and certain souls who were the prisoners of their own passions and lusts would have taken into their hands an axe, cutting the root of this Blessed Tree.

Intimately linked to following all guidance from his appointed successor, provisions in Bahá'u'lláh's covenant further enjoin individuals and entire Bahá'í communities to lovingly support the leadership of all administrative institutions Bahá'u'lláh ordained for his Faith.

In the Bahá'í Faith every believer is welcome to hold personal theological opinions, but they should not press them upon others. Being firm in the covenant of Bahá'u'lláh, loyal to its provisions, and having unshakable confidence that decisions of the authority at center of the Baha'i Faith reflects the will of God, is a chief spiritual virtue for Bahá'ís.

=== Kitáb-i-ʻAhd ===
Bahá'u'lláh established the successorship of the Bahá'í Faith with a document called the Kitáb-i-`Ahd (the Book of the Covenant), written in his own hand and entrusted before his death to 'Abdu'l-Bahá. In this document Bahá'u'lláh reaffirmed his mission from God, exhorted the peoples of the world to observe that which will elevate them, and forbade conflict and contention, while succinctly and emphatically placing successorship of the Faith in the hands of the Most Mighty Branch, a title reserved exclusively for 'Abdu'l-Bahá.

Years earlier in late Edirne period (September 1867–August 1868) Bahá'u'lláh composed a document entitled the Tablet of the Branch in which he announced the high station of ‘Abdu’l-Bahá, titled Ghuṣn-i-A‘ẓam (‘the Greatest Branch’), foreshadowing His later appointment in the Kitáb-i-‘Ahd as successor, and in his Book of Laws he decreed that after his death Bahá'ís should turn towards "Him Whom God hath purposed, Who hath branched from this Ancient Root". When the Kitáb-i-'Ahd was read after his death, Bahá'u'lláh's previous references to 'Abdu'l-Bahá in these two documents were confirmed and then fully understood by believers. Unlike past religions, in conferring upon 'Abdu'l-Bahá the station and authority of being the Center of his Covenant, Bahá'u'lláh in numerous statements also made clear that 'Abdu'l-Bahá was a unique enduring model for others to emulate as God had endowed him with "perfection in personal and social behavior".

=== Further developments ===
In his own Will and Testament, 'Abdu'l-Bahá extended Bahá'u'lláh's lesser covenant with believers by appointing his eldest grandson Shoghi Effendi the Guardian and head of the Bahá'í Faith. Bahá'u'lláh's covenant had bestowed upon 'Abdu'l-Bahá the position of being the sole authorized interpreter of the holy writings of the Faith. In his will, 'Abdu'l-Bahá subsequently designated the same role and authority to Shoghi Effendi as "the expounder of the words of God".

'Abdu'l-Bahá also affirmed in his will that, in addition to the Guardian, the Universal House of Justice, established in Bahá'u'lláh's Book of Laws as the supreme legislative body of his Faith, was the other Bahá'í institution given global leadership and authority in the Faith. The mandate of the Universal House of Justice is to make or enact laws on any matter not expressly revealed in Bahá'í scriptures, and Bahá'u'lláh promises that God will "inspire them with whatsoever He willeth." The Universal House of Justice became the head of the Bahá'í Faith upon its election in 1963 by Bahá'ís from around the world.

The covenant of Bahá'u'lláh is specifically referred to by Shoghi Effendi as the means of directing and canalizing the spiritual forces released by Bahá'u'lláh's revelation in this world, and to "insure their harmonious and continuous operation after His ascension". He further stated the purpose of Bahá'u'lláh's covenant is to preserve the Faith's influence and integrity, to protect its unity, and to stimulate its growth around the planet.

== See also ==
- Will and Testament of ʻAbdu'l-Bahá
- Covenant-breaker
- Attempted schisms in the Baháʼí Faith
