= Holy Spirit in Johannine literature =

Holy Spirit in the works of the Apostle John

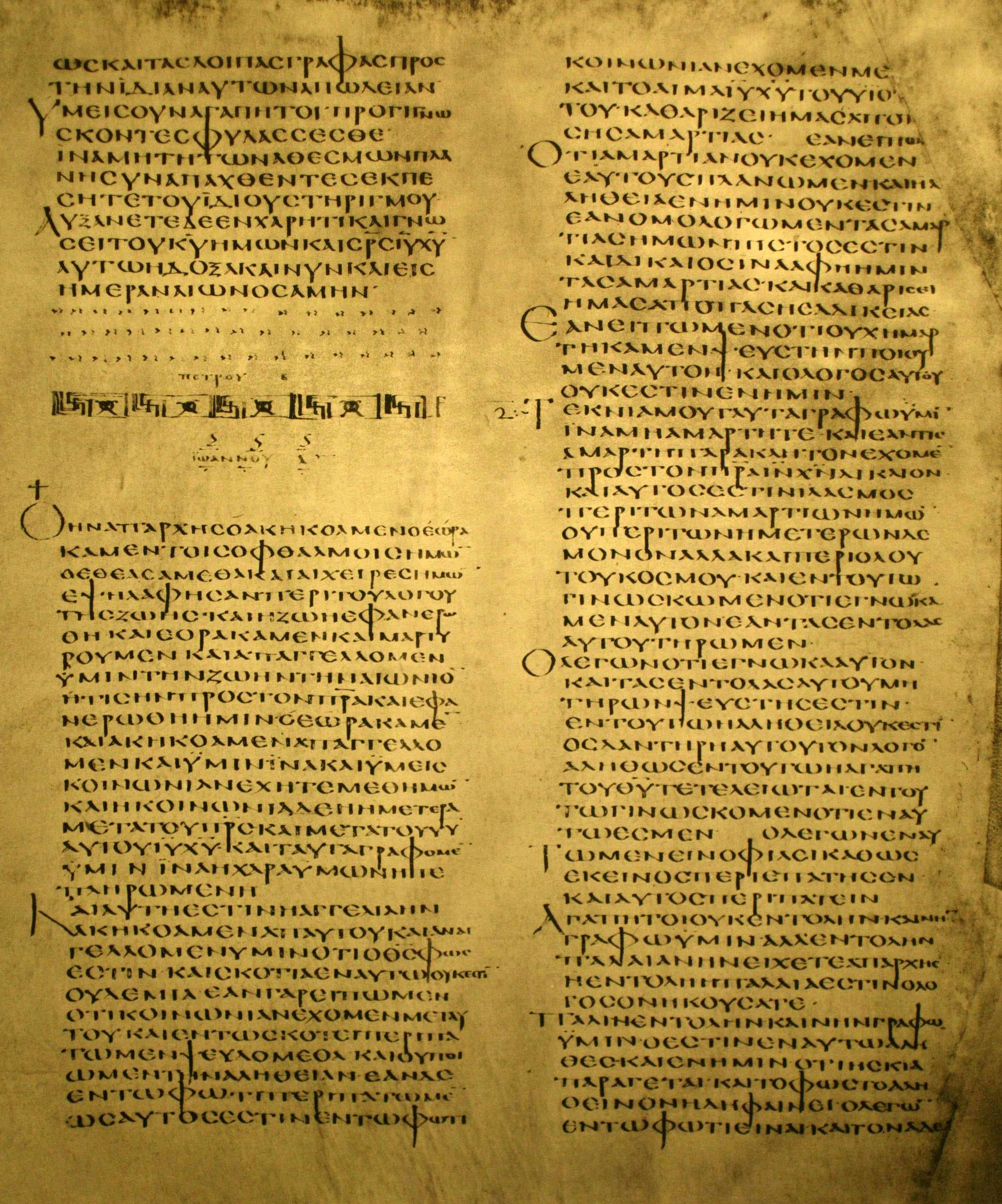
First Epistle of John in Codex Alexandrinus, 5th century

By the end of the 20th century, the theological importance of the Holy Spirit in Johannine literature had been accepted by New Testament scholars, overshadowing the early 20th-century views that minimized its role in the writings of John.

== The terms ==
Three separate terms, namely Holy Spirit, Spirit of Truth (Greek: Πνεῦμα τῆς ἀληθείας, romanized: Pneuma tēs alētheias), and Paraclete, are used in Johannine literature. The "Spirit of Truth" is used in John 14:17, 15:26 and 16:13. The First Epistle of John then contrasts this with the "spirit of error" in 1 John 4:6. 1 John 4:1–6 provides the separation between spirits "that confesseth that Jesus Christ is come in the flesh is of God" and those who in error refuse it—an indication of their being evil spirits.

In John 14:26 Jesus states: "But the Comforter, [even] the Holy Spirit, whom the Father will send in my name, he shall teach you all things". The identity of the "Comforter" has been the subject of debate among theologians, who have proposed multiple theories on the matter.

Paraclete considered as the Spirit of Truth is used three times in the Gospel of John: in 14:15–17, 14:26, and 15:26–27, where it is viewed as the "Spirit which communicates Truth". The concept of "truth" in Johannine writings is then intertwined with John 16:13's statement of how the Spirit of Truth acts as guide that leads believers to truth, building on the assurance given in John 14:26 that the Paraclete facilitates and confirms the memory of "all that Jesus had taught his disciples" and John 15:26's statement that "Spirit of truth, which proceedeth from the Father, he shall bear witness of me".

== Bibliography ==
- Attridge, Harold W. (2008). "Part II: The Jesus Movements – Johannine Christianity". In Mitchell, Margaret M.; Young, Frances M. (eds.). The Cambridge History of Christianity, Volume 1: Origins to Constantine. Cambridge: Cambridge University Press. pp. 125–143. doi:10.1017/CHOL9780521812399.008. ISBN 9781139054836.
- Bellinzoni, Arthur J. (25 February 2000). The Early Christian Community: From Diversity to Unity to Orthodoxy. Lecture delivered to the Wells College Faculty Club.
- Black, C. Clifton; Smith, D. Moody; Spivey, Robert A., eds. (2019) [1969]. "John: The Gospel of Jesus' Glory". Anatomy of the New Testament (8th ed.). Minneapolis: Fortress Press. pp. 129–156. doi:10.2307/j.ctvcb5b9q.15. ISBN 978-1-5064-5711-6. OCLC 1082543536. S2CID 242455133.
- Byers, Andrew J. (2017). "Narrative Pneumatology and Triadic Theology: The Spirit-Paraclete as the Character Who Divinizes Beyond the Narrative". Ecclesiology and Theosis in the Gospel of John. Cambridge: Cambridge University Press. pp. 224–234. doi:10.1017/9781316823750.012. ISBN 9781316823750.
- Doole, J. Andrew (March 2021). "To Be 'An Out-of-the-Synagoguer'". Journal for the Study of the New Testament. 43 (3). SAGE Publications: 389–410. doi:10.1177/0142064X20973905. ISSN 1745-5294. S2CID 228846103.
- Ferreira, Johan (1998). Johannine Ecclesiology. The Library of New Testament Studies. Sheffield: Sheffield Academic Press. ISBN 9780567286833. LCCN 98156774.
- Hill, Charles E. (2005). "Part III: The Evidence for a Johannine Corpus". The Johannine Corpus in the Early Church. Oxford and New York: Oxford University Press. pp. 447–464. doi:10.1093/0199264589.003.0009. ISBN 9780199264582. OCLC 475098055.
- Hughes, Kyle R. (2020). How the Spirit Became God: The Mosaic of Early Christian Pneumatology. Eugene, OR: Cascade Books. ISBN 978-1-5326-9376-2.
- Koester, Craig R. (2015). Revelation: A New Translation with Introduction and Commentary. The Anchor Yale Bible Commentaries. Vol. 38A. New Haven and London: Yale University Press. ISBN 9780300216912.
- Lincoln, Andrew T. (2018). "The Johannine Vision of the Church". In Avis, Paul (ed.). The Oxford Handbook of Ecclesiology. Oxford and New York: Oxford University Press. pp. 98–118. doi:10.1093/oxfordhb/9780199645831.013.23. ISBN 9780199645831.
- Ong, Hughson T. (2015). "The Gospel from a Specific Community but for All Christians: Understanding the Johannine Community as a "Community of Practice"". In Porter, Stanley E.; Ong, Hughson T. (eds.). The Origins of John's Gospel. Johannine Studies. Vol. 2. Leiden and Boston: Brill Publishers. pp. 101–123. doi:10.1163/9789004303164_007. ISBN 978-90-04-30316-4. ISSN 2214-2800.
- Painter, John (2010). "Johannine Literature: The Gospel and Letters of John". In Aune, David E. (ed.). The Blackwell Companion to the New Testament. Chichester, West Sussex: Wiley-Blackwell. pp. 344–372. doi:10.1002/9781444318937.ch20. ISBN 9781444318937.
- Reinhartz, Adele (2013). "Forging a New Identity: Johannine Rhetoric and the Audience of the Fourth Gospel". In Krans, Jan; Lietaert Peerbolte, L. J.; Smit, Peter-Ben; Zwiep, Arie W. (eds.). Paul, John, and Apocalyptic Eschatology: Studies in Honour of Martinus C. de Boer. Novum Testamentum: Supplements. Vol. 149. Leiden: Brill Publishers. pp. 123–134. doi:10.1163/9789004250369_009. ISBN 978-90-04-25026-0. ISSN 0167-9732. S2CID 171267332.
- Williams, Catrin H. (2018). "Faith, Eternal Life, and the Spirit in the Gospel of John". In de Boer, Martinus C.; Lieu, Judith M. (eds.). The Oxford Handbook of Johannine Studies. Oxford and New York: Oxford University Press. doi:10.1093/oxfordhb/9780198739982.013.20. ISBN 9780198739982. LCCN 2018947872.
