= Baháʼu'lláh =

Founder of the Baháʼí Faith (1817–1892)

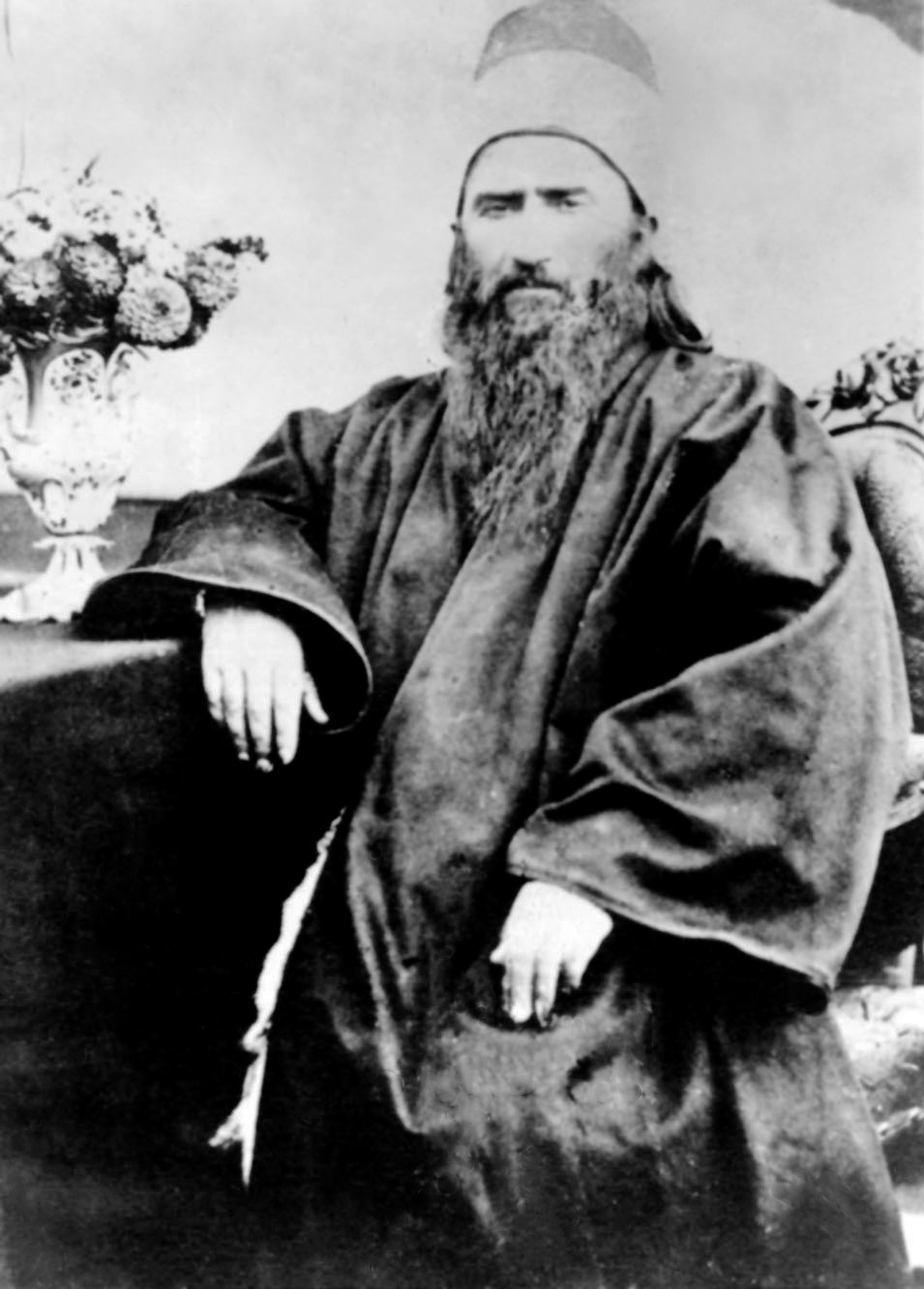
- Baháʼu'lláh in 1868

Personal life
- Born: Mírzá Ḥusayn-ʻAlí Núrí; 12 November 1817 Tehran, Iran
- Died: 29 May 1892 (aged 74) Acre, Vilayet of Beirut, Ottoman Empire (present-day Israel)
- Resting place: Shrine of Baháʼu'lláh; 32°56′36″N 35°05′32″E
- Spouse: Ásíyih; Fatimih; Gawhar
- Children: 11, including ʻAbdu'l-Bahá, Bahíyyih, Mihdí, and Muhammad ʻAlí
- Notable work(s): Various, including Kitáb-i-Aqdas and Kitáb-i-Íqán
- Known for: Establishing Baháʼí Faith
- Relatives: Subh-i-Azal (half-brother); Shoghi Effendi (great-grandson)

Religious life
- Religion: Islam (1817–1844); Bábism (1844–1863); Bahá’í Faith (1863–1892)

Senior posting
- Successor: ʻAbdu'l-Bahá
- Disciples: see apostles of Baháʼu'lláh

Baháʼu'lláh (Persian: [bæhɒːʔolːɒːh], born Ḥusayn-ʻAlí; 12 November 1817 – 29 May 1892) was an Iranian religious leader who founded the Baháʼí Faith. He was born to an aristocratic family in Iran and was exiled due to his adherence to the messianic Bábism. In 1863, in Ottoman Iraq, he first announced his claim to a revelation from God. He spent the rest of his life in further imprisonment in the Ottoman Empire. His teachings revolved around the principles of unity and religious renewal, ranging from moral and spiritual progress to world governance.

Baháʼu'lláh was raised with no formal education but was well-read and devoutly religious. His family was considerably wealthy, and at the age of 22 he turned down a position in the government, instead managing family properties and donating time and money to charities. At the age of 27 he accepted the claim of the Báb and became one of the most outspoken supporters of the new religious movement which advocated, among other things, abrogation of Islamic law, which attracted heavy opposition. At the age of 33, during a governmental attempt to exterminate the movement, Baháʼu'lláh narrowly escaped death, his properties were confiscated, and he was banished from Iran. Just before leaving, while imprisoned in the Síyáh-Chál dungeon, Baháʼu'lláh describes receiving revelations from God marking the beginning of his divine mission. After settling in Ottoman Iraq, Baháʼu'lláh again attracted the ire of Iranian authorities, and they requested that the Ottoman government move him farther away. He spent months in Constantinople where the authorities became hostile to his religious claims and put him under house arrest in Edirne for four years, followed by two years of harsh confinement in the prison-city of Acre. His restrictions were gradually eased until his final years were spent in relative freedom in the area surrounding Acre.

Baháʼu'lláh wrote at least 1,500 letters, some book-length, that have been translated into at least 802 languages. Some notable examples include the Hidden Words, the Kitáb-i-Íqán, and the Kitáb-i-Aqdas. Some teachings are mystical and address the nature of God and the progress of the soul, while others address the needs of society, religious obligations of his followers, or the structure of Bahá’í institutions that would propagate the religion. He viewed humans as fundamentally spiritual beings and called upon individuals to develop divine virtues and further the material and spiritual advancement of society.

Baháʼu'lláh died in 1892 near Acre. His burial place is a destination for pilgrimage by his followers, known as Bahá’ís, who now reside in 236 countries and territories and number between 5 and 8 million. (Note: In 2001, an independent researcher confirmed that there were reliably over 5 million enrolled Bahá’ís in the world. In 2020 the Baháʼí World Centre estimated "about eight million" Baháʼís reside in "well over 100,000 localities" worldwide.) Baháʼís regard Baháʼu'lláh as a Manifestation of God in succession to others like Buddha, Jesus, or Muhammad.

== Name, title, and photographs ==
Baháʼu'lláh's given name was Ḥusayn-ʻAlí, and as the son of a nobleman in the province of Núr, he was known as Mírzá Ḥusayn-ʻAlí Núrí (Persian: میرزا حسین‌علی نوری). In 1848 he took the title Baháʼ (بهاء), Arabic for "glory" or "splendour", or Baháʼu'lláh (/bəˈhɑːʔʊlɑː/, Arabic: بَهاءُالله), as a glorification of God.

Many symbols and phrases of the Baháʼí Faith derive their significance from the word Baháʼ. For example, a nine-pointed star or nine-sided temples are references to the numerical value of Baháʼ according to a system of numerology (b=2, h=5, á=1, ʼ=1); the word Baháʼí indicates a follower of Baháʼ, and his son ʻAbdu'l-Bahá (Servant of Baháʼ) chose his title to demonstrate servitude toward Baháʼu'lláh.

In the 1930s, Baháʼís adopted a standardized system of transliterating Arabic that renders Arabic faithfully into Roman script. The vowels without diacritical marks are short, and those with diacritical marks are long. His name is pronounced in four syllables: Ba, as in bat; há, as in hard; the apostrophe-like mark after "Bahá" is for the Arabic letter hamza which represents the glottal stop; u'l as in old (the apostrophe represents a contraction and is not pronounced); and láh as in law.

Common transliterations of the name, with or without diacritical marks, include Baha'u'llah, Bahaullah, and Baháʼ Alláh.

There are two known photographs of Baháʼu'lláh, both taken in Adrianople. Bahá’ís avoid displaying photographs or imagery of Baháʼu'lláh in public or in their homes, and prefer that others also avoid displaying them in books and websites. One picture is shown to Bahá’ís during visits to the International Archives building as part of an organized Bahá’í pilgrimage; it may also be displayed on certain other highly significant special occasions. The other image was reproduced by William Miller in his 1974 polemic against the Baháʼí Faith.

== Early life in Iran ==
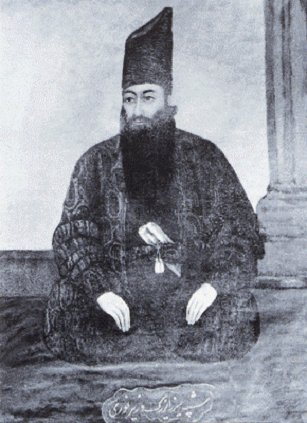
A depiction of Mírzá ʻAbbás Núrí, the father of Baháʼu'lláh

Baháʼu'lláh was born in Tehran, Iran, on 12 November 1817. Baháʼí authors trace his ancestry to Abraham through both his wives Keturah and Sarah, (Note: Through her descendant Jesse, the father of David.) to the Zoroaster, to David's father Jesse, and to Yazdegerd III, the last king of the Sasanian Empire. His mother was Khadíjih Khánum, (Note: A widow with three children, she became the second wife of Baháʼu'lláh's father.) his father Mírzá ʻAbbás Núrí, known as Mírzá Buzurg, served as vizier to Imám-Virdi Mírzá, the twelfth son of Fath-Ali Shah Qajar.

Baháʼu'lláh married Ásíyih Khánum, the daughter of a nobleman, in Tehran in 1835 when he was 18 and she was 15. (Note: Ásíyih Khánum and her children ʻAbdu'l-Bahá, Bahíyyih Khánum and Mírzá Mihdí are the "holy family" of the Baháʼí Faith. For details on Bahá’u’lláh’s two other wives and his children from those marriages, see Baháʼu'lláh's family.) In his early twenties Baháʼu'lláh declined the life of privilege offered by his aristocratic lineage, instead devoting his time and resources to a range of charitable works that earned him renown as "the Father of the Poor".

=== Acknowledgment of the Báb ===
The Báb, a 24-year-old merchant from Shiraz, stirred Persia with his claim in May 1844, to not only be the promised redeemer of Islam (the Qa’im or Mahdi), but a new prophet of God similar to Moses, Jesus, and Muhammad. His original name was ʿAlí Muḥammad, and later assumed the title of the Báb (lit. 'the gate'), indicating his position as a spiritual "gate to divine knowledge", and to a still greater God-sent educator whose imminent appearance he was preparing the way for.

Soon after declaring his spiritual mission to Mullá Husayn, (Note: A Muslim cleric who was the first person to believe in the Báb.) the Báb sent him to Tehran to deliver a special tablet (Note: Term for a letter on a religious topic) to one whom God would guide him to. After learning about Baháʼu'lláh through an acquaintance, Mullá Husayn felt compelled to arrange for Baháʼu'lláh to receive the tablet—this news brought great joy to the Báb when Mullá Husayn wrote him about it. Bahá’u’lláh received the tablet when he was 27, he immediately acknowledged the truth of the Báb's message and arose to share it with others. In his native province of Núr, Bahá’u’lláh's notability as a prominent local provided numerous opportunities to teach the Bábí Faith, and his trips attracted many to the new religion, including Muslim clerics. His Tehran home became a center for activities, and he generously gave financial support for the religion. In the summer of 1848, Bahá’u’lláh attended and hosted a gathering at Badasht in the province of Khorasan, where 84 Bábí disciples met for 22 days. At that conference historic discussions took place between those who wanted to maintain Islamic law (the religious heritage of most early Bábís (Note: Though most Baháʼís in Iran are of Muslim heritage, subsequent 19th-century conversions of sizeable numbers of individuals from Judaism and Zoroastrianism in the country are well documented.)) and those who believed the Báb had inaugurated a new religious dispensation. Baháʼu'lláh influenced agreement around the latter point of view. It was at Badasht that Mírzá Ḥusayn-ʻAlí Núrí assumed the name Bahá’ and also gave new spiritual names to all other attendees; thereafter the Báb addressed tablets to them by those names. (Note: For insight into the giving of spiritual names, see "Personal Names and Titles in Islamic and Baha'i Usage". In Walbridge, John (2002). "Essays and Notes on Babi and Baha'i History".) When Táhirih, the most prominent female disciple of the Báb, was arrested after the conference, Baháʼu'lláh intervened to protect her. Subsequently, he himself was temporarily confined and punished with bastinado.

The Bábí Faith quickly spread across Persia, attracting large numbers of adherents. This provoked widespread opposition from both Islamic clerics fearful of losing congregants and associated benefits, and from civil authorities afraid of the growing influence of the Bábí community, resulting in thousands of Bábís being killed in relentless campaigns of persecution. In July 1850 the Báb himself was executed by firing squad in Tabriz at the age of 30.

In his teachings the Báb identifies himself as the first of two Manifestations of God whom the Creator was sending to usher in the enduring peace that is to signify humanity's attainment of maturity—when all people will live in unity as one human family. Baháʼís hold that the Báb's teachings lay the groundwork "for the eventual establishment of a society characterized by the unity of nations, fellowship of religions, equal rights of all people, and a compassionate, consultative, tolerant, democratic, moral world order". Woven throughout the Báb's teachings are references to "He whom God shall make manifest", the great Promised One for whom he was preparing the way. In numerous prophesies the Báb stated that the next divine educator would appear shortly after his own expected martyrdom. In one of his major works, the Báb stated: "Well is it with him who fixeth his gaze upon the Order of Baháʼu'lláh, and rendereth thanks unto his Lord."

=== Arrest and imprisonment ===
Events leading up to and after the execution of the Báb were tumultuous for Bábís. As Muslim leaders incited fanatic mobs to violence against them, many Bábís—while refusing to take offensive steps against attackers—did take actions to defend themselves, but commonly ended-up being slaughtered. On 15 August 1852, two Bábí youth, in retaliation for the killings of the Báb and his leading disciples, made an attempt to assassinate the Iranian king. As Nasiri'd-Din Shah passed along a public road the two blocked the monarch to fire birdshot at him. The king escaped without serious injury, but the incident led to an outburst of persecution against Bábís far exceeding past events.

Though investigations found the offending pair acted alone, a "reign of terror" was unleashed, killing at least 10,000 Bábís that same year as government ministers vied with one another to collectively punish known or suspected Bábís, including Bahá’u’lláh. Well known for his support of the Bábí cause, Baháʼu'lláh was arrested and incarcerated in the subterranean Síyáh-Chál of Tehran, where he was bound in heavy chains that left life-long scars. Baháʼu'lláh was confined to that dungeon for four months, as the mother of the Shah and authorities seeking to curry favor with the king sought ways to justify executing him.

=== Revelation ===
Bahá’u’lláh relates that during imprisonment in the Síyáh-Chál he had several mystical experiences, in which he received his mission as a manifestation of God, the Promised One heralded by the Báb. Bahá’ís view this dawning of Bahá’u'lláh's spiritual mission as the beginning of fulfillment of the Báb's prophecies regarding "Him whom God shall make manifest". The "inseparable" nature and unity of the twin revelations of the Báb and Bahá’u’lláh are why Bahá’ís consider both faiths as forming one complete religious entity, and the reason the 1844 declaration of the Báb is considered the starting date of the Bahá’í Faith.

=== Banishment from Persia ===
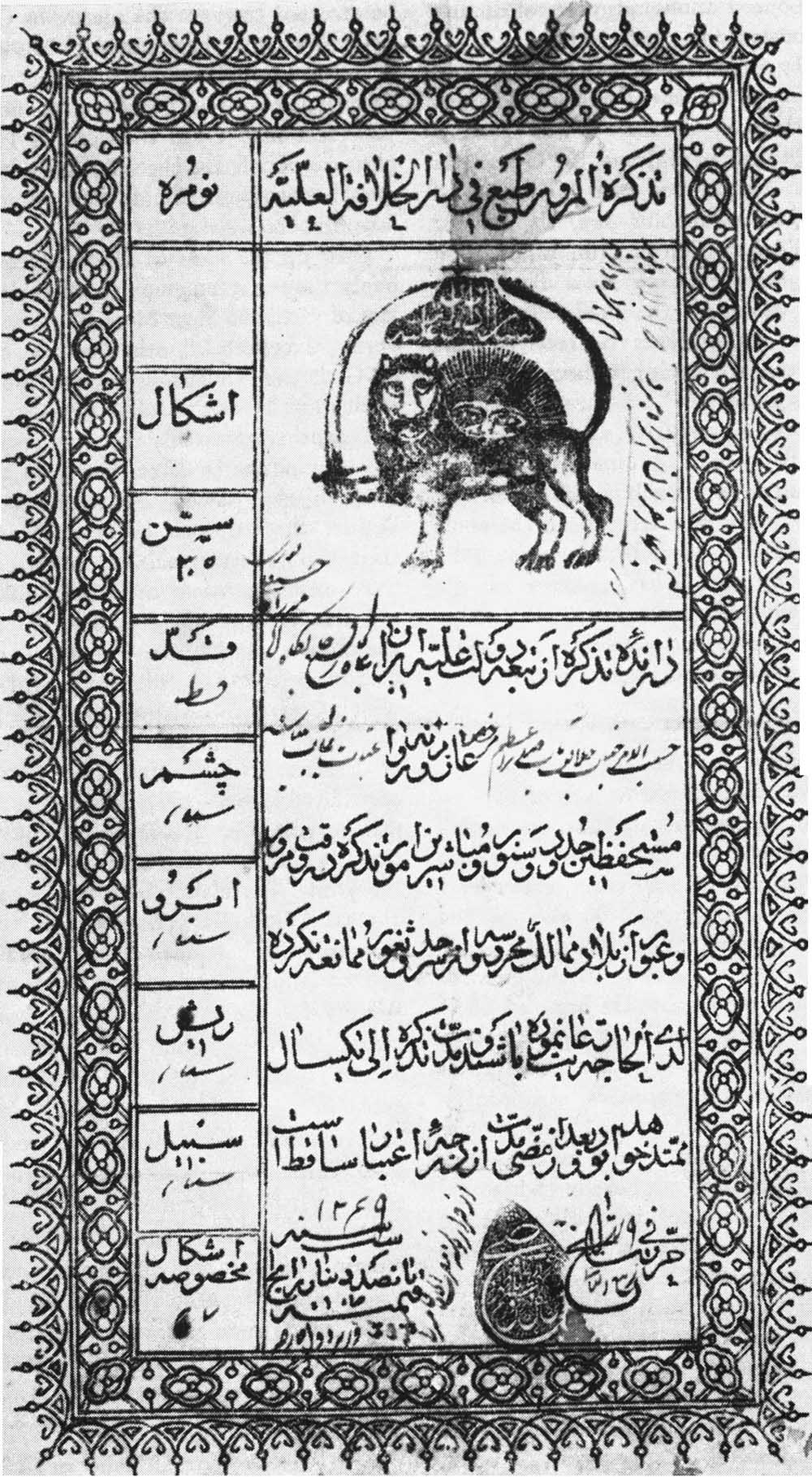
Baháʼu'lláh's passport, dated January 1853

When it was proven beyond any doubt that Baháʼu'lláh was innocent of involvement with the attempt against the Shah's life, the Shah finally agreed to free him but decreed that Baháʼu'lláh would be permanently banished from Persia. Dispossessed of his extensive properties and wealth, in the exceptionally severe winter of January 1853 Baháʼu'lláh with family members undertook a three-month journey to Baghdad, thus beginning what became exile for the rest of his life in territories of the Ottoman Empire.

== Life in exile ==
=== Baghdad ===
Upon settling in Baghdad, Baháʼu'lláh began dispatching communications and teachers to encourage and revive flagging spirits of persecuted followers of the Báb in Persia. Over time, a number of Bábís moved to Baghdad to be close to Bahá’u’lláh. One of these was Mirza Yahya, later known as Subh-i-Azal, a half-brother 13 years younger than Bahá’u’lláh, who followed him into the Bábí Faith and even accompanied him on some early journeys on its behalf. After their father's death, Yahya's education and care were largely overseen by Bahá’u’lláh. During Baha’u’llah's imprisonment in the Síyáh-Chál Yahya went into hiding, but after Bahá’u’lláh's exile to Ottoman Iraq Yahya left Iran in disguise and made his way to Baghdad.

For a time, Yahya served as Bahá’u’lláh's secretary in Baghdad, but envy for the growing admiration Bábís showed Bahá’u’lláh led Yahya to seek leadership of the Bábí religion. Attempting to elevate himself among Bábís, Yahya and a few supporters referenced a letter the Báb had written a few years earlier when Yahya was still a teenager, naming Yahya to nominal leadership pending the appearance of "Him whom God shall make manifest". Yahya claimed the letter meant he was actually appointed the successor or vicegerent of the Báb. Knowledgeable Bábís promptly rejected Yahya's bold claim, because the referenced letter indicated no such status, and due to the fact that other writings of the Báb specifically "eliminated the institution of successorship, or vicegerency" from his religion. The Báb also decreed no one's words would be binding upon believers until the advent of the Promised One. Others questioned Yahya's motives, considering he had never done anything to protect the Bábí Faith or the lives of Bábís over which he was now claiming a high position. To bolster his effort, Yahya simultaneously sought to discredit Bahá’u’lláh by spreading false rumors and accusations about him, which stirred up feelings among Bábís in the Baghdad community.

=== Departure for Iraqi Kurdistan ===
Declining to dispute with Yahya or do anything to "endanger the unity and survival of the already demoralized Bábí community", Bahá’u’lláh entrusted his family to the care of his brother Mirza Musa and without notice left Baghdad on 10 April 1854 for mountains in the north near Sulaymaniyyih in Iraqi Kurdistan. He later wrote that he withdrew to avoid becoming a source of disagreement within the Bábí community.

Initially living as a hermit in those mountains, Bahá’u’lláh dressed as a dervish and used the name Darvish Muhammad-i-Irani. In Sulaymaniyyih the head of a noted theological seminary happened to meet Bahá’u’lláh and invited him to visit. There a student noticed Bahá’u’lláh's exquisite penmanship, which raised the curiosity of leading instructors. As he responded to their queries on complex religious themes, Bahá’u’lláh quickly gained admiration for his learning and wisdom. Shaykh ʻUthmán, Shaykh ʻAbdu'r-Rahmán, and Shaykh Ismáʼíl, leaders of the Naqshbandíyyih, Qádiríyyih, and Khálidíyyih Orders respectively, began to seek his advice. It was to the second of these that Bahá’u’lláh's book the Four Valleys was written.

During Bahá’u’lláh's absence from the Baghdad Bábí community, Mirza Yahya's true nature became increasingly clear. The public respect and morale of Bábís soon disintegrated as Yahya failed to give spiritual guidance or to demonstrate in daily living the lofty standards taught by the Báb. His actions to discredit Bahá’u’lláh, and any who admired him, grew. At the same time Yahya used the Bábí Faith to benefit himself materially and to try to augment his delusory standing, employing means towards those ends which shamefully contradicted statements by the Báb. He also engaged in criminal activities, including persuading several followers to murder other Bábís whom Yahya viewed as potential adversaries, or as supporters of such imagined rivals. Yahya even took steps to initiate another attempt to assassinate the Shah of Persia. Yahya's utter failings as a religious leader led most Bábís to reject his claims.

When rumors of a ‘saint’ living in Sulaymaniyyih reached Bábí friends in Baghdad they suspected it was Bahá’u’lláh and asked one of his relatives to locate and beg him to return to help the community. Acceding to their urgent requests, to which Yahya even added an appeal, Bahá’u’lláh returned to Baghdad on 19 March 1856.

=== Return to Baghdad ===
Over the next 7 years, Bahá’u’lláh undertook to transform the Bábí community. Through personal example, as well as encouragement and constant interaction with Bábís, Bahá’u’lláh "restored the community to the moral and spiritual level it had attained during the Báb's lifetime". Growing numbers were drawn to join the reinvigorated Bábí movement. As Bahá’u’lláh's renown as a spiritual guide and Bábí leader grew, Mirza Yahya remained withdrawn. The spread of Bahá’u’lláh's reputation in Baghdad and surrounding areas, along with increased dissemination of his writings, attracted "[p]rinces, scholars, mystics, and government officials" to meet him, many "prominent in Persian public life." This development unnerved antithetical elements among Iran's Islamic clergy, and again raised the "intense fear and suspicion" of the Iranian monarch and his advisors.

=== Invitation to Constantinople ===
The Persian government asked the Ottoman government to extradite Baháʼu'lláh back to Persia, but the latter refused. The Persians then pressed the Ottomans to remove Baháʼu'lláh from Baghdad which was near Iran's border. The result was an invitation in April 1863 from Sultan ʻAbdu'l-ʻAzíz himself inviting Baháʼu'lláh to reside in the Ottoman capital Constantinople (now Istanbul).

=== First announcement ===
On 22 April 1863, Baháʼu'lláh left his house in Baghdad for the banks of the Tigris River and crossed to enter the verdant Najibiyyih garden-park on the other side, which a Baghdad admirer had offered for his use. (Note: Ever since it has been referred to as the Garden of Ridván (Paradise) by Bahá’ís.) There Baháʼu'lláh stayed for twelve days with family members and a few close followers chosen to accompany him. Upon arrival in the garden Bahá’u’lláh declared to his companions that he was "Him whom God shall make manifest", the one promised by the Báb, and announced that his mission as God's latest manifestation in this world had commenced. (Note: Baháʼís worldwide celebrate the twelve-day Ridván period as a festival associated with Bahá’u’lláh’s formal declaration of his spiritual mission.)

=== Sojourn in Constantinople ===
Bahá’u’lláh left the Riḍván garden on 3 May 1863 and proceeded with his family to Constantinople as guests of the Ottoman government, accompanied by a mounted government escort arranged for their protection by 'Ali Pasha, the Sultan's prime minister. Other travelers included at least two dozen companions who requested Bahá’u’lláh's permission to accompany him. Though not included in the Sultan's invitation, Mirza Yahya joined the group en route. After fifteen weeks Bahá’u’lláh arrived in the Ottoman capital on 16 August 1863. He was welcomed by various government ministers of the Sultan, and by prominent personalities who paid their respects. The Persian ambassador also sent emissaries to greet him the day after his arrival.

At the time, it was customary for prominent government guests such as Bahá’u’lláh to "call on the prime minister and other high-ranking officials", during which the guests would seek favors, broker deals, and secure various forms of official support for themselves. When Bahá’u’lláh did not return any visits, Kamal Pasha, a former Ottoman prime minister, even reminded him of the custom. Bahá’u’lláh's response was that he knew of the practice "but had no demands to make of anyone nor did he require favors from them; therefore there was no reason" for him to call upon anyone.

Bahá’u’lláh's independence and detachment from the situation was used by the Persian ambassador to maliciously misrepresent Bahá’u’lláh before the Ottoman court, and to press for his banishment from the capital. As a consequence, less than four months after arriving in Constantinople, the prime minister suggested the Sultan banish Baháʼu'lláh and his companions to Adrianople (now Edirne), which the ruler promptly approved.

=== Expulsion to Edirne ===
On 12 December 1863, Baháʼu'lláh arrived in Adrianople with his family and other companions. His presence there, which lasted four and a half years, became a significant period for the further unfoldment of his mission among Bábís, and for the general proclamation of his cause. Over the next two years, writings which flowed from Bahá’u’lláh were broadly shared with Bábís in Iran. Bahá’u’lláh dispatched several trusted followers to Iran, and most of the Bábís came to recognize him as the leader of their faith.

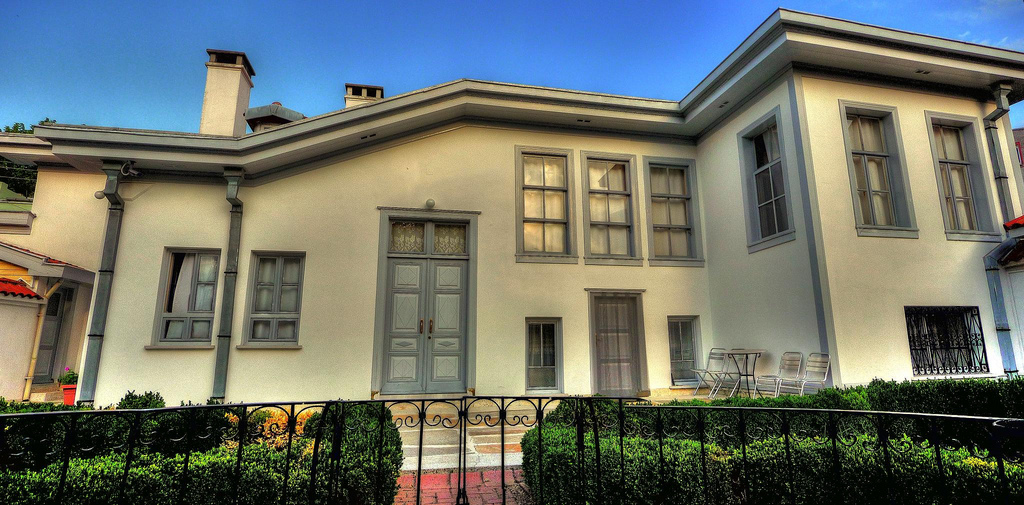
The house where Baháʼu'lláh stayed in Adrianople

Emboldened by lack of persecution against Bábís, Mirza Yahya began to appear in public, which coincided with an aggressive stance towards Bahá’u’lláh's recent claim. Yahya personally poisoned Bahá’u’lláh when he invited him for tea. His doing so caused a severe month-long illness that left Bahá’u’lláh with a tremor in his hand for the rest of his life. Though Bahá’u’lláh advised those who knew not to speak of what had happened, awareness of the incident grew, giving rise to strong agitation among Bábís. However, it was Yahya's subsequent attempt on Bahá’u’lláh's life that brought about "an unprecedented commotion in the community". It involved Ustad Muhammad-‘Aliy-i-Salmani, a traditional barber who served as Bahá’u’lláh's bath attendant. (Note: Public bath houses were common in the 1800s both in Iran and among Turks because baths were not built into houses of the time. Public baths were places where acquaintances often gathered to socialize and share news. Most clients were provided with attendants, though some arranged their own.) Salmani reported that Yahya suddenly began to show kindness to him, then one day insinuated it would be "a great service" to their religion if he assassinated Bahá’u’lláh while attending to him in the bath. Salmani was so outraged he said his immediate thought was to kill Yahya—he hesitated only because he knew doing that would displease Bahá’u’lláh. Agitated, he informed Bahá’u’lláh's faithful brother Mirza Musa of the incident, who advised him to ignore it, saying Yahya had thought of this for years. Still upset, Salmani told ‘Abdu’l-Bahá, Bahá’u’lláh's eldest son, about the matter, who told him not to speak of it to others. Salmani finally informed Bahá’u’lláh, who likewise said he should not mention it to anyone. Until this incident, because Yahya was a half-brother whom Bahá’u’lláh always treated with kindness and care, most in the Bábí community also showed Yahya respect, even if they did not accept his claims to a special religious status. However, when Salmani was unable to keep silent and openly related to others what Yahya had asked of him, Yahya's actions and intentions incited great turmoil amidst the Bábís.

Having given his younger sibling ample guidance and opportunities to live as a Bábí should, and having repeatedly forgiven him for things he had done in the past, Bahá’u’lláh decided the time had come to formally declare to Mirza Yahya that he was God's latest manifestation, the Promised One of the Báb, "Him whom God shall make manifest"—because doing so would require him to obey Bahá’u’lláh if Yahya were to remain faithful to the Báb. (Note: Yahya already knew of Bahá’u’lláh’s declaration of spiritual station made in the Riḍván garden but had never referenced or acknowledged it.) Bahá’u’lláh made that declaration to Yahya in early March 1866 through a tablet penned in Bahá’u’lláh's own handwriting and read aloud to Yahya by Bahá’u’lláh's amanuensis. Besides unequivocally proclaiming his spiritual station, Bahá’u’lláh called upon Yahya "to recognize and support him as the Báb had explicitly instructed him to do." Mirza Yahya's response was to counter that he, not Bahá’u’lláh, was the promised manifestation mentioned by the Báb. This step by Yahya promptly resulted in almost all Bábís in Adrianople, who were already devoted to Bahá’u’lláh, deciding to have nothing further to do with Yahya or his few supporters. As news of this development reached Bábís in Persia and Iraq, and surviving Bábí members of the Báb's family, their response in support of Bahá’u’lláh was the same. Mirza Yahya's effort to claim a divine station thus effectively cleaved him from most Bábís, for it was against the Báb's covenant with his followers which decreed that whensoever "Him whom God shall make manifest" announced himself all Bábís were required to accept him. From this time onwards those who understood the Báb's teachings about the Promised One began to call themselves "Bahá’ís" (meaning the people of Bahá’, followers of Bahá’u’lláh). (Note: Mirza Haydar-‘Ali, who lived at the time, recorded in his book "Bihjatu’s-Sudur" that an estimated 99% of Bábís recognized Bahá’u’lláh as their Promised One.)

=== Final exile and imprisonment in Acre ===
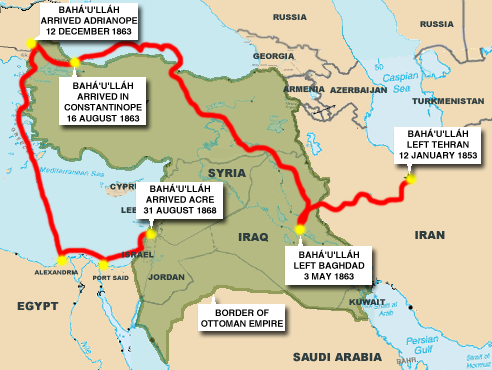
Map tracing Baháʼu'lláh's banishments

Having lost all respect or influence among Bábís who had become Bahá’ís, Mirza Yahya again sought to discredit Baháʼu’lláh with Ottoman authorities, accusing him of agitating against the Turkish government. Yahya's actions provoked a government investigation, which cleared Baháʼu’lláh—but fearing religious issues might stir up future disorder, the Ottomans decided to imprison both Baháʼu'lláh and Mirza Yahya in far-flung outposts of their empire. In July 1868 a royal decree condemned Bahá’u’lláh and his family to perpetual imprisonment in the pestilential penal colony of Acre; banished with them were most Bahá’ís in Adrianople, and a handful of Azalis. (Note: Yahya's followers became known by this term; "Azal" was a designation given to Yahya by the Báb.) Mirza Yahya's intrigue also resulted in his own captivity—because Turkish authorities suspected he was involved in some conspiracy, he was sent to prison in Famagusta, Cyprus with his family, some Azalis, and four Bahá’ís. (Note: For further details of what transpired between Bahá’u’lláh and Mirza Yahya, as well as references giving Bahá’í and Azali views on their differences, see the article Baháʼí–Azali split.)

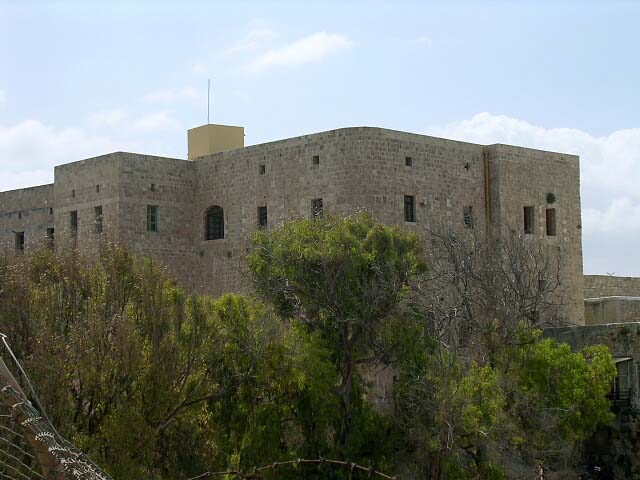
Prison in Acre in which Bahá'u’lláh was incarcerated

Leaving Adrianople on 12 August 1868, Bahá’u’lláh and his companions arrived in Acre on 31 August where they were incarcerated in the city's prison citadel. Inhabitants of Acre were told the new prisoners were enemies of the state, of God, and his religion, and association with them was strictly forbidden. The first years in ‘Akká were under very harsh conditions with many Bahá’ís becoming sick (three eventually died). June 1870 witnessed the tragic death of Baháʼu'lláh's 22-year-old son Mirzá Mihdí who fell through an unguarded skylight as he paced on the roof of the prison one evening while engrossed in prayer and meditation. After a while, relations between Bahá’í prisoners, officials, and the local community improved, so conditions of their imprisonment were eased. When visiting Acre in April 1871, Dr. Thomas Chaplin (director of a British-run hospital in Jerusalem) met with ʻAbdu'l-Bahá, on behalf of Baháʼu'lláh, in a home the family was living in after being moved out of the citadel. Afterward, the physician sent a letter regarding Baháʼu'lláh to the editor of The Times, which was printed on 5 October 1871. (Note: This seems to be the first substantial commentary on Baháʼu'lláh in a Western newspaper.) Eventually, after the Sultan's death, Baháʼu'lláh was allowed to leave the city to visit nearby places, and to then reside in areas outside Acre. From 1877 to 1879, Baháʼu'lláh lived in Mazra'ih, a house a few miles north of the prison city.

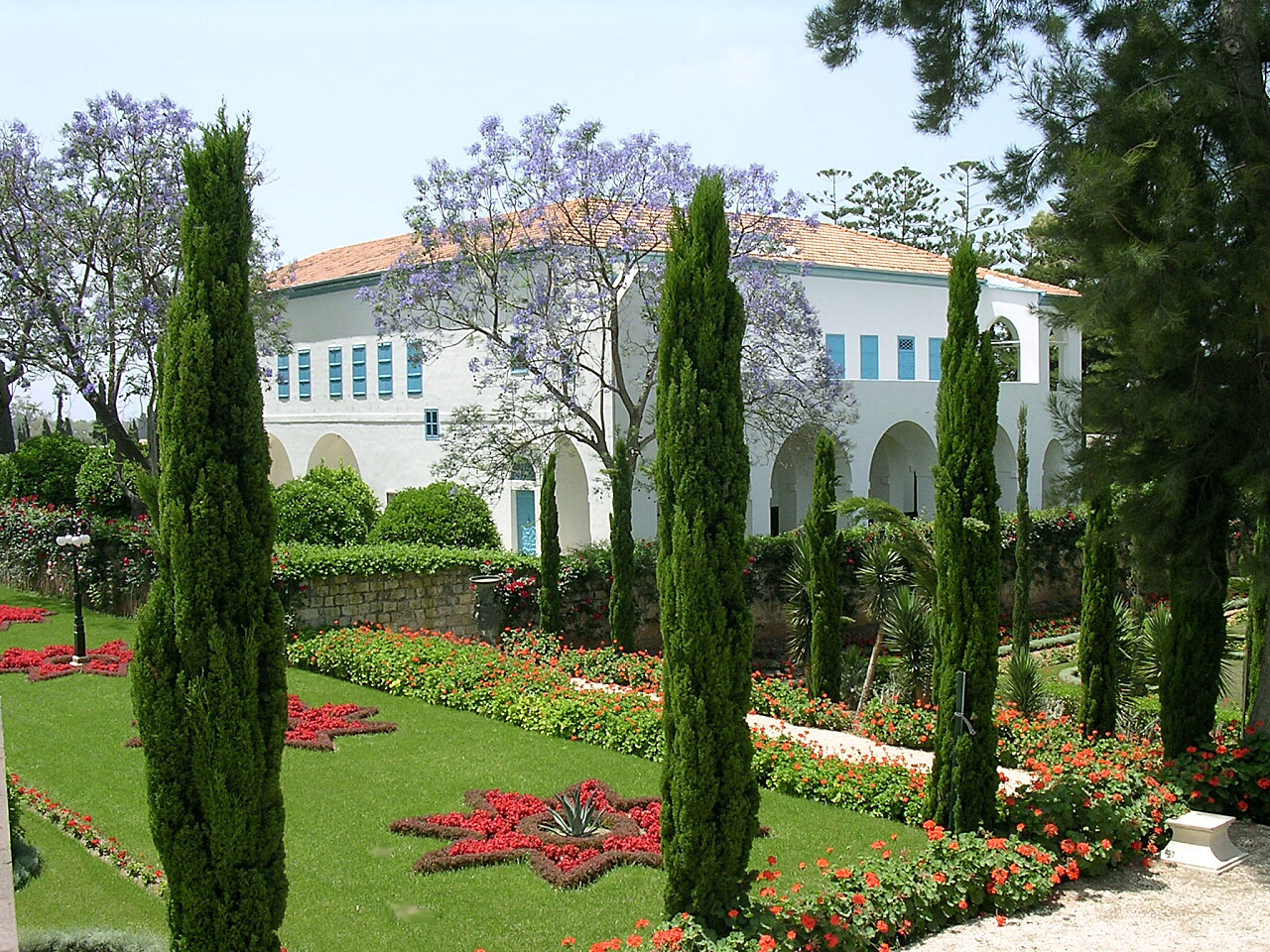
Mansion of Bahjí near Acre

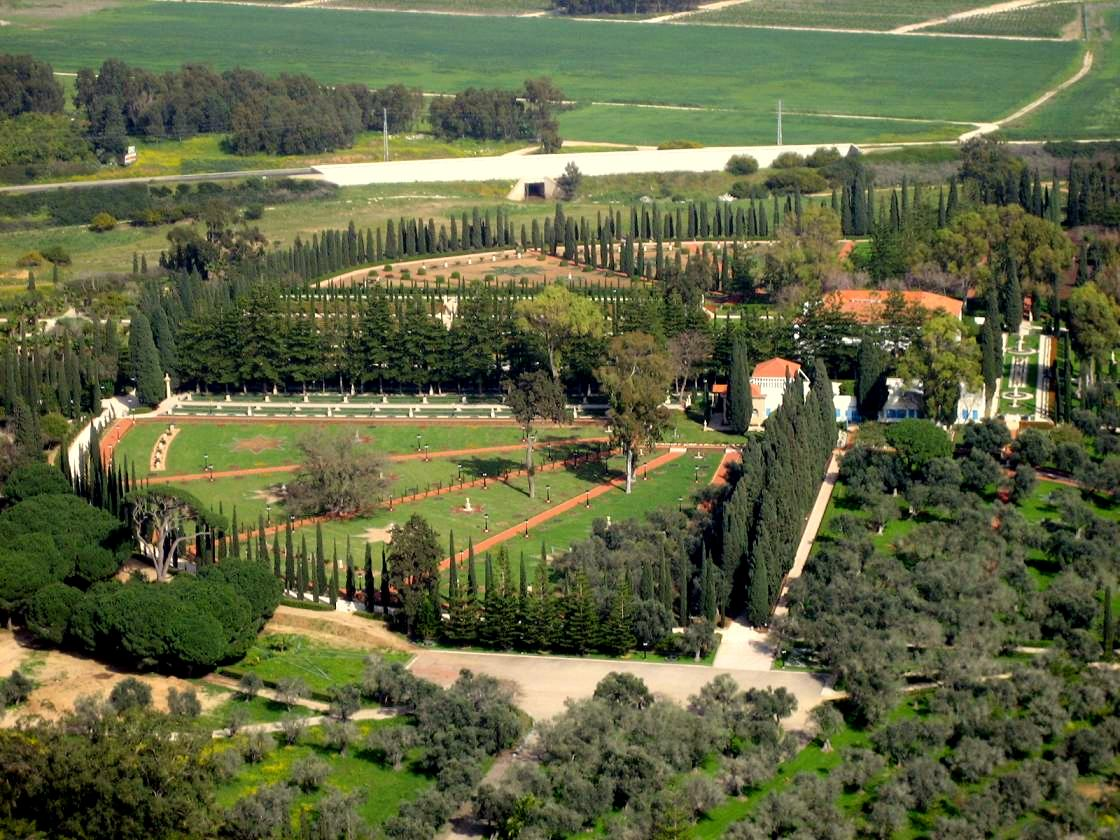
Aerial view of gardens around the shrine of Bahá'u'lláh

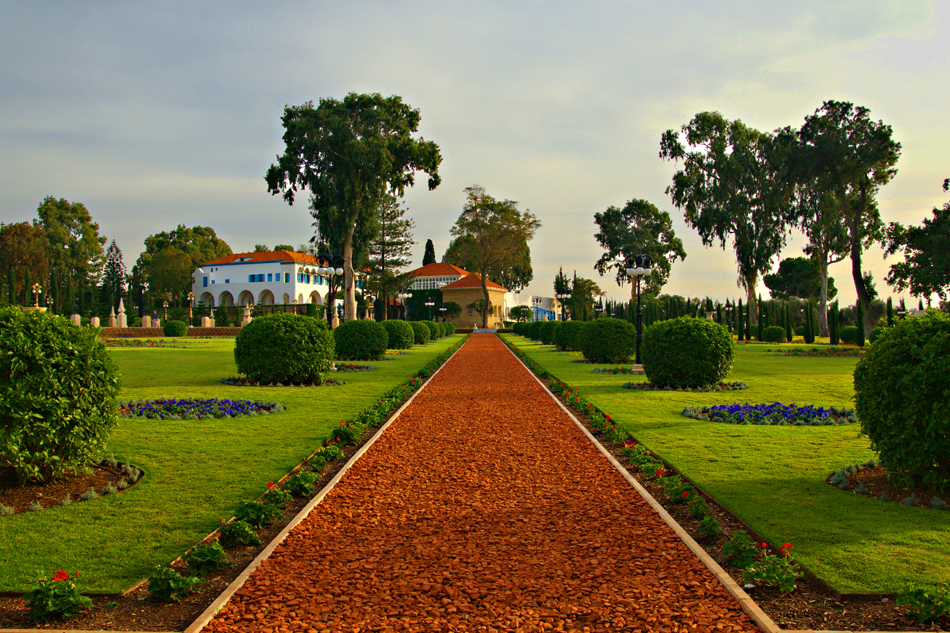
Approach to the Shrine of Bahá'u'lláh, with Mansion of Bahjí to the left

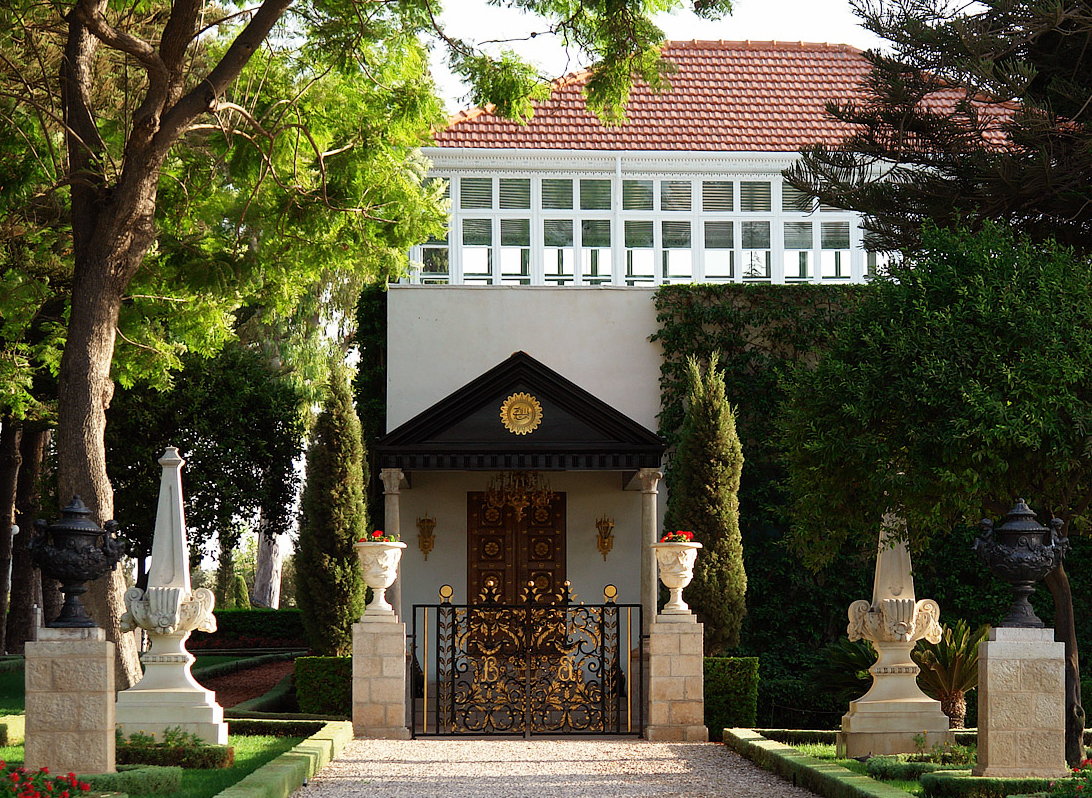
Entrance to the Shrine of Bahá'u'lláh

Though formally still a prisoner of the Ottoman Empire, the final years of Baháʼu'lláh's life (1879–1892) were spent in the Mansion of Bahjí, just outside Acre. Baháʼu'lláh devoted his time to writing numerous volumes detailing his teachings, including his vision for a united world, the need for ethical actions, and many prayers.

In 1890, Cambridge orientalist Edward Granville Browne was able to interview Baháʼu'lláh in Bahji. After this meeting he wrote his famous pen-portrait of Baháʼu'lláh:

In the corner where the divan met the wall sat a wondrous and venerable figure... The face of him on whom I gazed I can never forget, though I cannot describe it. Those piercing eyes seemed to read one's very soul; power and authority sat on that ample brow... No need to ask in whose presence I stood, as I bowed myself before one who is the object of a devotion and love which kings might envy and emperors sigh for in vain! A mild dignified voice bade me be seated, and then continued:

"Praise be to God that thou hast attained!... Thou hast come to see a prisoner and an exile... We desire but the good of the world and the happiness of the nations; yet they deem us a stirrer up of strife and sedition worthy of bondage and banishment... That all nations should become one in faith and all men as brothers; that the bonds of affection and unity between the sons of men should be strengthened; that diversity of religion should cease, and differences of race be annulled—what harm is there in this?... Yet so it shall be; these fruitless strifes, these ruinous wars shall pass away, and the 'Most great Peace' shall come.... Is not this that which Christ foretold?... Yet do We see your kings and rulers lavishing their treasures more freely on means for the destruction of the human race than on that which would conduce to the happiness of mankind... These strifes and this bloodshed and discord must cease, and all men be as one kindred and one family... Let not a man glory in this, that he loves his country; let him rather glory in this, that he loves his kind."

After a short illness, Baháʼu'lláh died on 29 May 1892 in Bahji. He was buried adjacent to the mansion in an existing building which now serves as his shrine. It is a place of pilgrimage for Bahá’ís from all over the world, and is the Qiblih they face for daily obligatory prayers. In 2008 the shrine of Bahá’u’lláh, along with other Baháʼí holy places in Acre and Haifa, were added to UNESCO's list of World Heritage Sites.

== Teachings ==
=== God ===
The Baháʼí concept of God is monotheistic. God is a single uncreated imperishable entity that is the absolute and ultimate source of all existence. Baháʼu'lláh unequivocally teaches "the existence and oneness of a personal God, (Note: While Bahá’ís believe God has "a Mind, a Will, a Purpose" and the capacity to reason and love, their conception of the Divine Being "is not anthropomorphic, for it transcends all human limitations and forms, and does by no means attempt to define the essence of Divinity which is obviously beyond any human comprehension. To say that God is a personal Reality does not mean that He has a physical form, or does in any way resemble a human being. To entertain such belief would be sheer blasphemy.") unknowable, inaccessible, the source of all Revelation, eternal, omniscient, omnipresent and almighty". Bahá’u’lláh asserted that the Creator cannot be grasped by creation—for anything made can never comprehend its maker. Nevertheless, Baháʼu'lláh said that the Creator bestowed upon humans' capacity to recognize the maker's existence, and the ability to develop spiritually through awareness of God's infinite superlative attributes and by striving to emulate those qualities as best as one can in life—virtues such as love, mercy, kindness, generosity, justice, etc.

=== Manifestations of God ===
Bahá’u’lláh explains human knowledge of God's existence and awareness of the Creator's attributes have been—and will forever be—only possible to the extent that these are shared by special Beings he and the Báb describe as Manifestations of God. Rather than simply being great thinkers with a better perspective on life than others, manifestations are spiritual entities specially created by God with capacities infinitely superior to ordinary humans. Existing in spiritual realms prior to birth in this physical life, each manifestation is sent by God to a particular period and place as an instrument of divine intervention to help the human race gradually develop its inherent capacities to realize God's plan for humanity.

Bahá’ís believe manifestations reflect the light of God's Will and Purpose in this world. Bahá’í writings liken manifestations to perfect mirrors reflecting one sun—though every mirror is distinct, yet the reflection cast by each is of the same sun, varying only due to differences relating to time and position. Bahá’u’lláh says the guidance of manifestations necessarily differ due to the particular situations and requirements of those they deal with:

The Prophets of God should be regarded as physicians whose task is to foster the well-being of the world and its peoples... Little wonder, then, if the treatment prescribed by the physician in this day should not be found to be identical with that which he prescribed before. How could it be otherwise when the ills affecting the sufferer necessitate at every stage of his sickness a special remedy? In like manner, every time the Prophets of God have illumined the world with the resplendent radiance of the Day Star of Divine knowledge, they have invariably summoned its peoples to embrace the light of God through such means as best befitted the exigencies of the age in which they appeared.

Bahá’ís perceive each major world religion as part of one God-ordained holistic educational process which has spiritually and socially enabled human civilization to progress, described as people learning to embrace ever-widening "circles of unity": ever more diverse families, tribes, city-states, and then nations. They believe, inevitably, the human race will embrace its final circle of unity, that of the planet itself.

Bahá’u’lláh links this "process of progressive revelation" to God's eternal covenant—the promise that every divine teacher makes with his followers regarding the next manifestation whom the Creator will send to guide them. Prophecies pertaining to this great covenant are found in scriptures of all religions, with every manifestation prophesying about the next one, and even others, to come. As for their responsibility in this covenant, the followers of each religion have the duty to carefully investigate, with an open mind, whether a person claiming to be the promised new messenger of their faith does, or does not, spiritually fulfill relevant prophecies.

=== Claims of prophetic fulfillment ===
In announcing his claim to be the promised manifestation heralded by the Báb, Baháʼu'lláh also declared his station as the Promised One prophesied in every major religion of the past—the divine teacher God vowed to send to usher in humanity's Golden Age. Bahá’u’lláh's claim to being several 'messiahs' converging in one person is understood by Bahá’ís as being a spiritual symbolic fulfillment rather than a literal fulfilment of messianic and eschatological prophecies of past faiths. This understanding is based upon Bahá’u’lláh's teachings regarding the oneness of God's manifestations, and the essential oneness of religion. Thus, Bahá’ís see Bahá’u’lláh as fulfilling prophecies of Jewish, Christian, Islamic, Zoroastrian, Hindu, and Buddhist scriptures.

=== Prescriptions for right living ===
Baháʼu'lláh calls upon every Bahá’í to live a righteous, healthy, productive life, characterized by good manners and moral virtues such as truthfulness, integrity, trustworthiness, patience, courtesy, hospitality, fidelity, purity, chastity, moderation, forbearance, justice and fairness. He encourages believers to associate with those of all faiths in a friendly and loving manner, condemns and forbids all forms of religious violence, including jihad. Baháʼu'lláh describes in detail the role of true religion as a deterrent to crime, as a force for the maintenance of social order, and as a catalyst for ongoing personal spiritual development, daily communion with God, and needed self-transformation. Baháʼu'lláh forbids asceticism, mendicancy, monasticism, and penance, while affirming the importance of working in some trade or profession to benefit oneself and others. Bahá’ís are urged to be exemplary, honest, loyal and conscientious citizens wherever they may reside, and to eschew pride, strife, slander and backbiting in all circumstances. Baháʼu'lláh's core message to his followers is to make every effort to serve humanity, and to collaborate with like-minded individuals in all efforts to advance the process of unifying the world in ways pleasing to God.

=== Social principles ===
Bahá'u’lláh repeatedly states his message is for all peoples, and that the purpose of his teachings is to build a new world in which humanity advances as a whole. He clearly proclaims the principle of the oneness of mankind, urging heads of state to join in resolving existing disputes to achieve peace and to safeguard it through collective security. To promote the development of a united world community, Baha’u’llah emphasizes the importance of eliminating religious and racial prejudices and avoiding extreme nationalism. Further, he stipulates the rights of all minorities must be safeguarded and their development nurtured. A condition described as absolutely necessary for the realization of global peace is complete equality between women and men worldwide. Bahá’u’lláh states that in God's sight the sexes are equal; neither is superior to the other. To realize such equality, Baháʼí teachings envisage the implementation of far-reaching societal changes everywhere—including mandates to end discriminatory practices against females and greater emphasis on education for girls to ensure women fulfill their potential in all fields of human endeavor.

=== Succession and the Covenant of Baháʼu'lláh ===
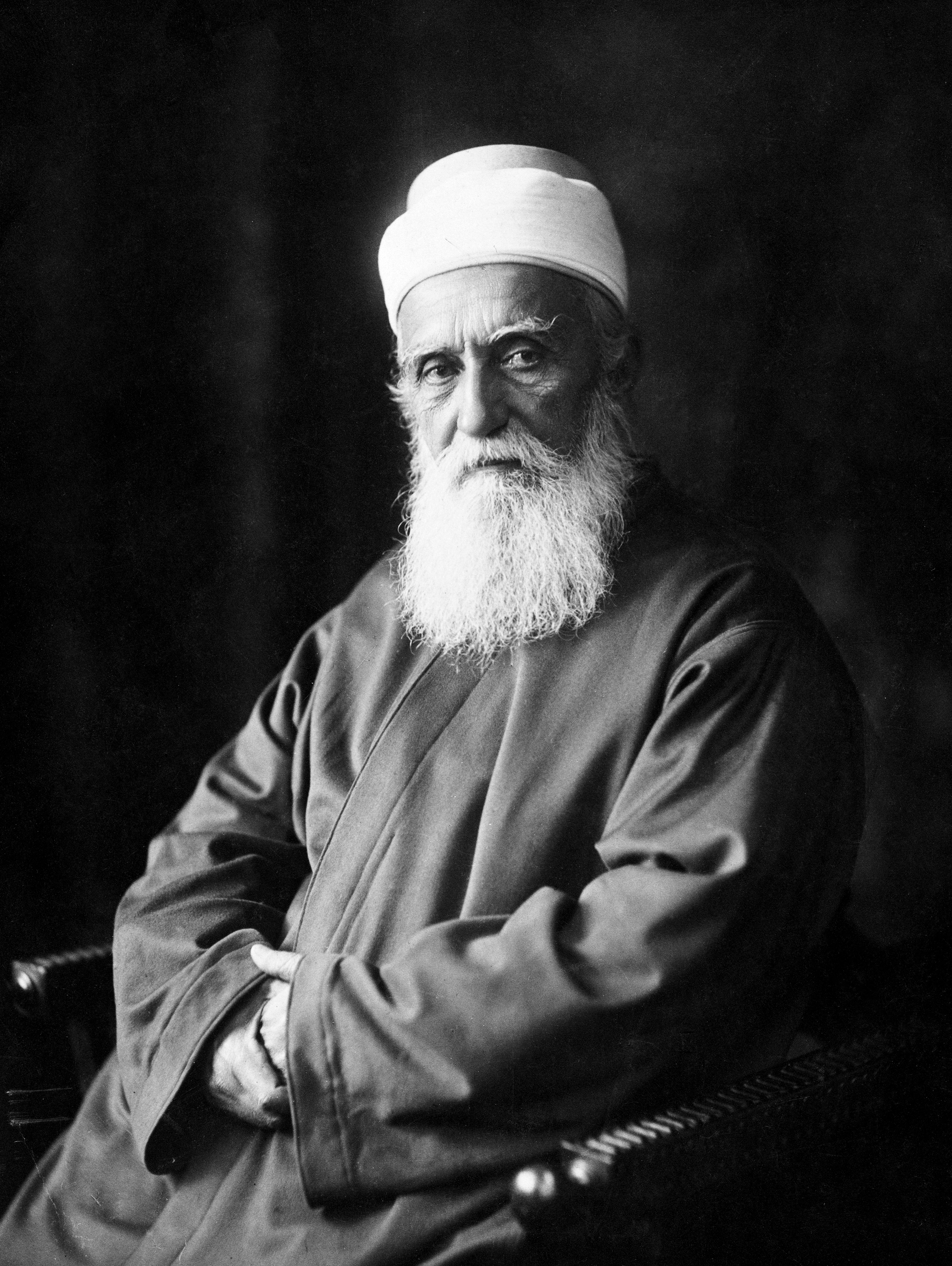
ʻAbbás Effendi, known as ʻAbdu'l-Bahá after Baháʼu'lláh's death

Baháʼu'lláh created an explicit Covenant with Bahá’ís in his will and testament which was written entirely in his own hand and is known as the "Book of My Covenant". It was unsealed and read before witnesses and members of his family on the ninth day after his death in 1892. To provide a single focal point of continued guidance, who could clarify and interpret his writings as needed, in his will Baháʼu'lláh entrusted leadership of the Bahá’í Faith to his eldest son ʻAbdu'l-Bahá by naming him his successor, the sole authorized interpreter of his writings, the perfect exemplar of his teachings, and the Centre of his Covenant with all Baháʼís. The unambiguous appointment of ʻAbdu'l-Bahá (Note: The given name of Bahá’u’lláh’s eldest son was ʻAbbás, but upon his appointment as the head of the Bahá’í Faith after Bahá’u’lláh’s death, he adopted the unassuming title ‘Abdu’l-Bahá which means "the Servant of Bahá’u’lláh" as a way to emphasize he had no desire but to be of service to Bahá’u’lláh’s cause. Thereafter, he requested all Bahá’ís refer to him as ‘Abdu’l-Bahá rather than by any of the exalted designations like the "Most Great Branch", the "Mystery of God" and the "Master" which Bahá’u’lláh had conferred upon him.) was readily accepted by most Baháʼís as a natural development, since for decades prior to Baháʼu'lláh's death ‘Abdu’l-Bahá was known for the extremely capable and devoted ways in which he carried out responsibilities entrusted to him by Baháʼu'lláh, and for the unrestrained praise his father showered upon him for his services.

The Covenant of Bahá’u’lláh explicitly conveyed "authority for the establishment of an institutional system designed to guide, protect, and enlarge the emerging Bahá’í community." Bahá’ís believe Bahá’u’lláh's Covenant is the distinguishing feature of his Faith that preserves its unity and protects it from breaking into sects, (Note: Since the establishment of Baháʼu'lláh's Covenant, a few individuals have rejected the appointment and authority of the head of the Baháʼí Faith, and sought to promote their own leadership; all have failed. Some describe those involved in such attempts (known as covenant-breakers by Baháʼís) as "sects" of the Baháʼí Faith. However, a distinguished legal scholar explains they cannot be correctly described as Bahá’í "sects" or "schisms" since none have ever successfully established a genuine "rival community". Udo Schaefer points out, "One cannot speak of a 'schism' when a division is of merely ephemeral significance since it did not result in the formation of a rival community. (Just as one does not speak of an ecclesiastical schism every time an individual member of a church performs an action constituting the ecclesiastical offence of 'schism'.)" For further consideration of these and related points, see Heller (2022, pp. 414–421).) as happened in older world religions after the deaths of their founders. To this day the Bahá’í Faith remains undivided.

=== Bahá’í administration ===
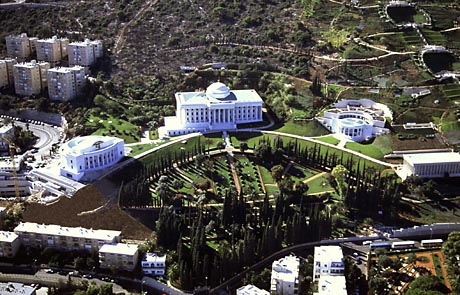
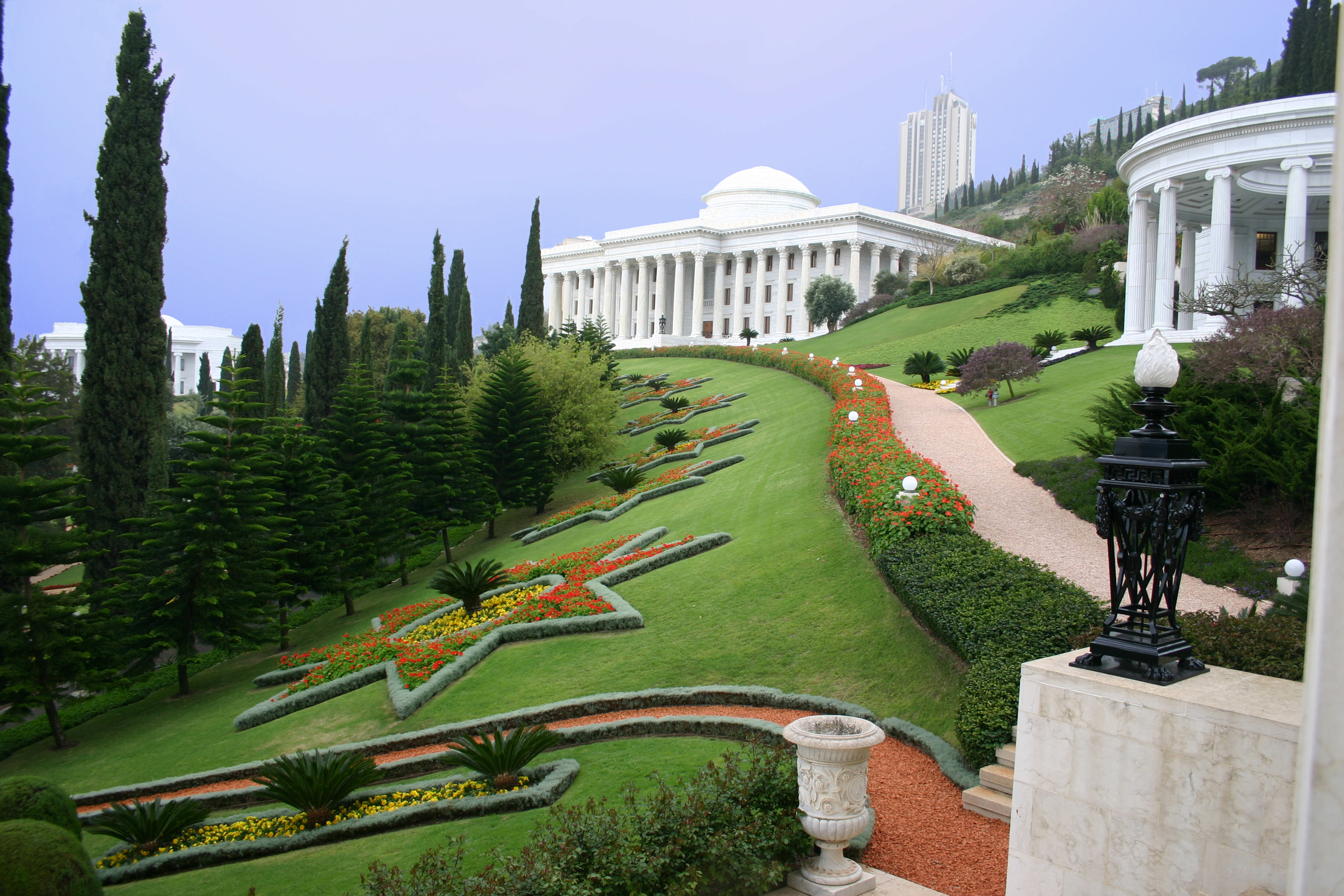
Aerial photo and a partial view of international administrative buildings on the Arc at the Baháʼí World Centre on Mt. Carmel in Haifa

Affairs of Bahá’í communities are administered, in most countries, (Note: A notable exception is the Bahá’í Faith in Iran, where Bahá’ís are severely persecuted by the Islamic regime and the Baháʼí administration is banned.) using Bahá’í principles of consultation and collective decision-making. As there is no clergy in the Bahá’í Faith, (Note: Bahá’u’lláh forbade any priesthood or professional clergy, since in his view they had historically been the primary source of animosity within and between religions after the deaths of their founders.) no individual Bahá’í has the authority to tell another how to think or what to do. Bahá’u’lláh strongly encouraged personal initiative among Bahá’ís in sharing his teachings but forbade proselytizing. Working in groups and community engagement are also considered important aspects of Bahá’í life. When requested or needed, individual and group efforts, and Bahá’í community activities in general are coordinated, guided, and supported by nine-member councils (elected annually by secret ballot) operating at local, regional, and national levels. Additional encouragement and spiritual guidance is provided by appointed individuals who do not have executive powers. Bahá’í projects are wholly supported by funds voluntarily given by Bahá’ís, as the Bahá’í Faith does not accept contributions from those who are not declared members. Bahá’í council members, as well as anyone appointed by them to assist with various community's activities (such as for moral education classes for children and junior youth), serve voluntarily. The Bahá’í administrative order is headed by the Universal House of Justice, the institution ordained and given authority for this purpose by Bahá’u’lláh in his Book of Laws; this world governing council is elected by Bahá’ís from around the world every five years at an international gathering held at the Baháʼí World Centre.

== Writings ==
=== Origins, form, and volume ===
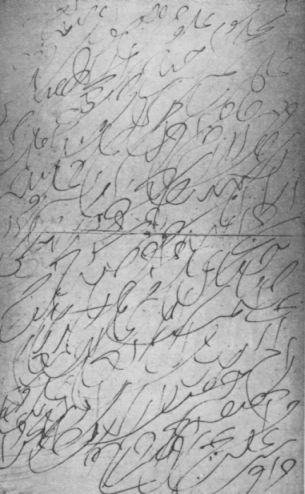
'Revelation writing': A shorthand script developed by an amanuensis to record first drafts as revelation flowed rapidly from Baháʼu'lláh

Bahá’ís consider all Bahá’u’lláh's writings as divinely revealed, including those composed before he announced his prophetic mission. When revelation was said to come to Bahá’u’lláh, he occasionally wrote it down himself but typically spoke the words aloud to an amanuensis. At times he spoke so quickly that it presented challenges for those recording his words. (Note: Any draft of revelation recorded by an amanuensis would later be re-transcribed, with Bahá’u’lláh himself overseeing and approving the final version.) The majority of Bahá’u’lláh's writings take the form of short letters, or tablets, addressed to an individual or several persons. Among his larger works are the Hidden Words, the Seven Valleys, the Book of Certitude (Kitáb-i-Íqán), the Kitáb-i-Aqdas (Most Holy Book), and the Epistle to the Son of the Wolf. The originals of Baháʼu'lláh's writings are in Persian and Arabic. His body of work is equivalent to more than 100 volumes—some 15,000 items have been identified and authenticated.

=== Content ===
Topics in his works are extensive and cover material, social, moral, and spiritual principles relevant to human life, both for individuals and groups. Categories include commentary on scriptures, prophecies, and beliefs of former religions; abrogation of past laws, and enunciation of laws and ordinances for this new dispensation; mystical writings; claimed proofs and explanations about God; statements relating to God's creation of human souls as noble entities capable of knowing the Creator exists and able to reflect all Its virtues; claimed proofs of life after death and descriptions of how souls progress for eternity in endless divine realms; exaltation of work performed in a spirit of service to the status of worship; explications on just governance and on creating unity and world order; expositions on knowledge, philosophy, alchemy, medicine and healthy living; spiritual principles underlying social teachings; calls for universal education; and living virtuously and in harmony with God's Will. Bahá’u’lláh also explores theodicy, and reasons for difficulties in this life; and he wrote numerous prayers and meditations.

==== Missives to world leaders ====
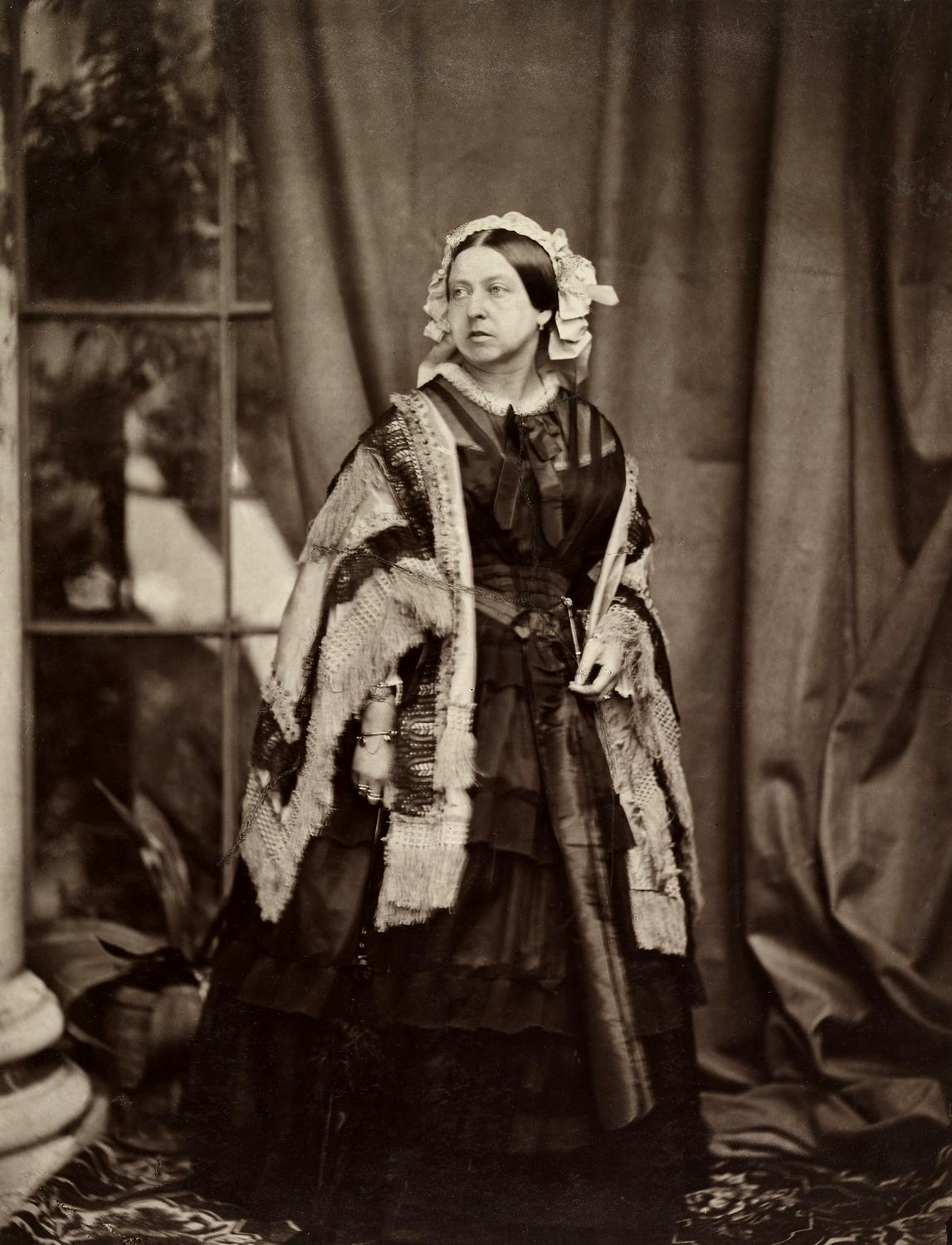
Queen Victoria in 1860, shown here a few years prior to receiving Baháʼu'lláh's Tablet addressed to her

Bahá’u’lláh wrote a series of letters addressed individually and collectively to monarchs, political rulers, and clerical leaders, in which he claimed to be the Promised One of the Torah, the Gospels, and the Qur’an. He asked them to accept his revelation, renounce their material possessions, rule with justice, protect the rights of the downtrodden, reduce their armaments, reconcile their differences, and collectively strive for the betterment of the world and the unification of its peoples. He warned that the world of that period was ending and that a global civilization was being born. Bahá’u’lláh further asserted that inexorable historical forces were in motion and that rulers should use the powers entrusted to them by God to serve humanity and bring about justice, peace, and unity.

In these letters Bahá’u’lláh also prescribed ways to develop a sense of community for the planet's peoples through collaborative endeavors such as creating an international auxiliary language, universal compulsory public education, and a common global currency and system of measurement; even as he urged rulers to dramatically curtail military spending, create an international tribunal to adjudicate disputes between nations, use taxes for social benefits, and adhere to principles of democracy in their internal affairs. To religious leaders, Bahá’u’lláh counseled them to seriously examine his cause without prejudice, forswear secular leadership, renounce dogma, embrace ecumenical outreach, and eliminate meaningless rituals; while advising monks to avoid cloistering, to mingle with people and engage in beneficial community services, and to marry.

The first of these missives was written in 1863 in Constantinople to Sultan ʻAbdu’l-ʻAzíz, upon receipt of his order banishing Bahá’u’lláh to Adrianople; others were written in Adrianople, and in Acre. In all, the following were addressed: Czar Alexander II of Russia; Francis Joseph I of Austria-Hungary; Napoleon III of France; Nasiri’d-Din Shah of Persia; Pope Pius IX; and Queen Victoria of Great Britain and Ireland; Ottoman Sultan ʻAbdu’l-ʻAzíz; Wilhelm I of Prussia; the rulers and presidents of the republics of America; elected representatives of peoples in every land; and leaders of religion. While little meaningful response was received from those written to, afterwards Bahá’u’lláh's letters did attract considerable attention (and even notable converts to his cause) for "the startling fulfillment of the individual prophecies they contained" warning Napoleon, the Pope, Kaiser Wilhelm, the Czar, Emperor Francis Joseph, the Shah, the Sultan, and the latter's prime minister and foreign minister, of their downfalls, loss of territories, or other divine chastisement for failure to heed his advice or for wrongs they had committed.

Author Christopher de Bellaigue wrote of the letters:

Bahaullah had little joy co-opting the temporal leaders of the age, to whom he addressed letters, or 'tablets', calling on them to throw their kingdoms at his feet. Queen Victoria replied equivocally; the tsar promised to investigate further. Napoleon III tore up his tablet and said that if Bahaullah was God, he was too. Nasser al-Din Shah had Bahaullah's messenger executed.

=== Voice ===
Bahá’u'lláh describes each manifestation as having a twofold nature, one relating to God, the other to this material world. Moreover, each has a "double station"—the first relates to his "innermost reality" in which he speaks with "the voice of God", while the second station is his human side. He says all manifestations, as "channels of God's all-pervasive grace", are unfailingly guided by the Creator to use "the inspiration of Their words" to affect human hearts and souls, so that open-minded individuals will grasp the truths being given.

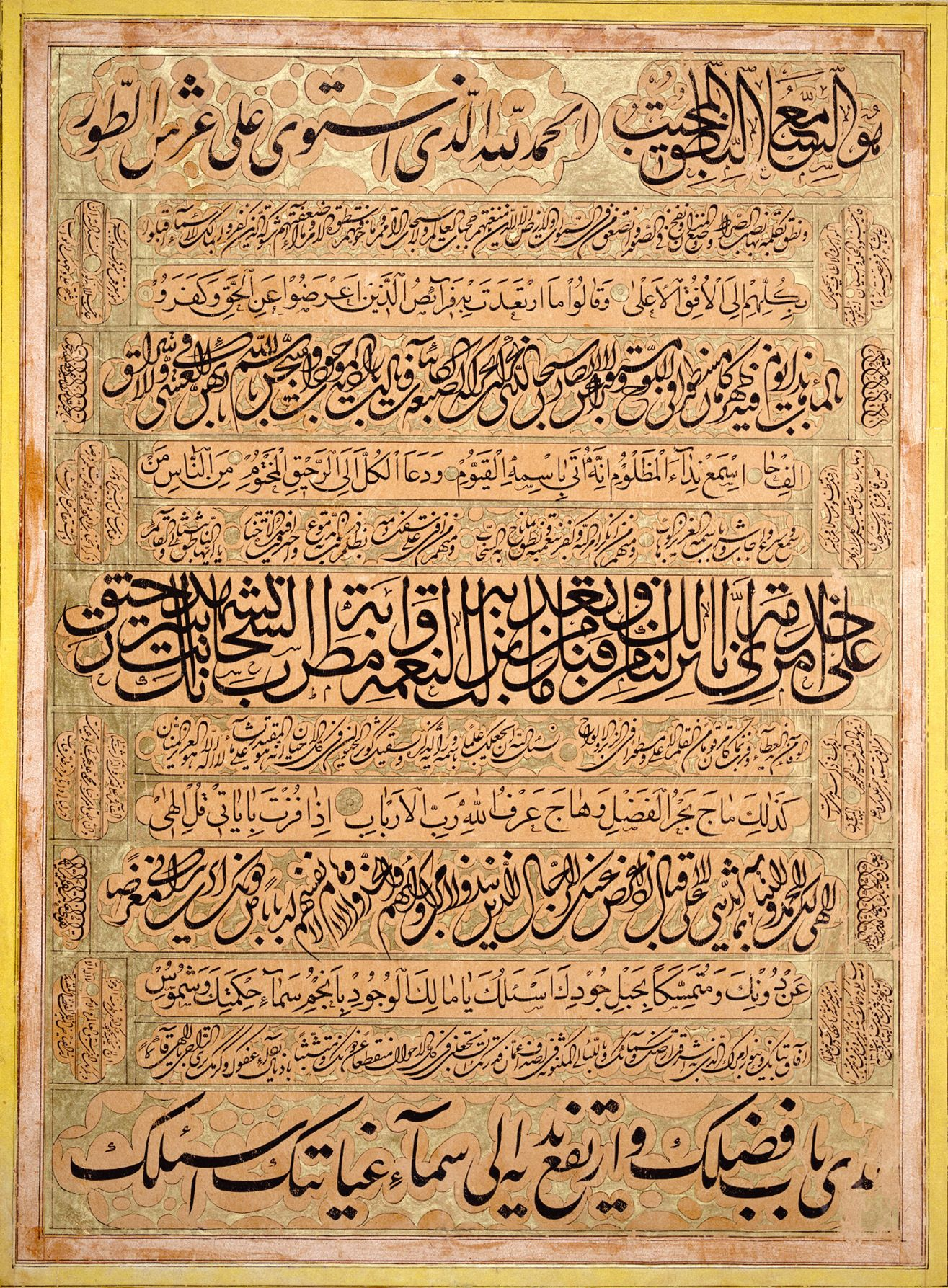
Text from a Tablet of Baháʼu'lláh, rendered calligraphically by Mishkín-Qalam

The "voice" in Bahá’u’lláh's writings varies depending upon the themes or topics covered, the specific backgrounds of their intended recipients, or particular questions which individuals asked of him. In many writings Bahá’u’lláh speaks as a caring counselor or friend sharing with another; in others it is someone conveying what the manifestation asked him to pass on; in some it is as if God is speaking in the first person; and in still others it is a lowly one speaking with profound humility before God—in absolute servitude and self-effacement.

In Bahá’u’lláh's writings, voice may change from one form to another within a single text, or take the form of a conversation—as seen in the dialogue between Bahá’u’lláh and God guiding him as His manifestation in the Fire Tablet, or in the Tablet of Carmel in which Mt. Carmel and Bahá’u’lláh as God's manifestation converse. In whatever style or voice a manifestation expresses himself, the aim is always to share spiritual truths. (Note: Skeptical criticism has suggested Bahá’u’lláh’s uses of the ‘Divine Voice’ were radical claims to being Divinity incarnated, rather than simply a writing style also seen in scriptures of other faiths. Denis MacEoin has argued that the contemporary Baháʼí view of Baháʼu'lláh's station as a Manifestation of God may be different from how Baháʼu'lláh viewed himself. Specifically, he contrasts the "official modern Bahāʾī doctrine reject[ing] any notion of incarnationism and stress[ing] instead his status as a locus of divine manifestation [...] comparable to a mirror with respect to the sun," to statements from some of Baháʼu'lláh's later writings, which MacEoin believes suggest a more radical view. For instance, he notes Baháʼu'lláh's statement that "He who speaks in the most great prison (i.e. Acre) is the Creator of all things and the one who brought all names into being." However, the understanding among Baháʼís is that writing in the voice of God is a literary style and represents a message coming through Baháʼu'lláh.) Shoghi Effendi, who was later appointed as the interpreter of Baháʼu'lláh's writings, gives the following statement of Bahá’í belief on this matter:

The human temple that has been made the vehicle of so overpowering a Revelation must, if we be faithful to the tenets of our Faith, ever remain entirely distinguished from that "innermost Spirit of Spirits" and "eternal Essence of Essences"—that invisible yet rational God Who, however much we extol the divinity of His Manifestations on earth, can in no wise incarnate His infinite, His unknowable, His incorruptible and all-embracing Reality in the concrete and limited frame of a mortal being. Indeed, the God Who could so incarnate His own reality would, in the light of the teachings of Baháʼu'lláh, cease immediately to be God. ...

That Baháʼu'lláh should, notwithstanding the overwhelming intensity of His Revelation, be regarded as essentially one of these Manifestations of God, never to be identified with that invisible Reality, the Essence of Divinity itself, is one of the major beliefs of our Faith—a belief which should never be obscured and the integrity of which no one of its followers should allow to be compromised.

=== Preservation and translation ===
The Bahá'í World Centre has ongoing efforts to ensure that Bahá’u’lláh's original writings are collected, authenticated, catalogued, and preserved. Through an ongoing global program of translation Bahá’u’lláh's writings currently are available in more than 800 languages. (Note: Though a small percentage of Bahá’u’lláh’s original writings have been translated into English, those completed include many of his most important works.)

== See also ==
- Apostles of Baháʼu'lláh
- Baháʼí Faith by country
- History of religion
- History of the Baháʼí Faith
- List of Baháʼís
