= Baháʼu'lláh's family =

Family of Bahá'u'lláh, founder of the Bahá'í Faith

Baháʼu'lláh was the founder of the Baháʼí Faith. He was born in 1817 to Khadíjih Khánum and Mírzá Buzurg of Nur (in the province of Mazandaran), a Persian nobleman, and went on to be a leader in the Bábí movement, and then established the Baháʼí Faith in 1863. Baháʼu'lláh's family consists of his three wives and the children of those wives.

== Titles of descendants ==
One of Baháʼu'lláh's titles is Sadratu'l-Muntahá, which translates from Arabic as the tree beyond which there is no passing (a quote from Qurʼan 53:14). In this connection, Baháʼu'lláh entitled his descendants with terms relating to the Sadratu'l-Muntahá. His male descendants were given the title of Ag͟hsán (Arabic for "Branches") which in singular form is "G͟husn". In particular, four of his sons were given specific "branch" titles:

- ʻAbdu'l-Bahá: G͟huṣn-i-Aʻẓam (Arabic: الغصن الأعظم "The Most Great Branch").
- Muhammad ʻAlí: G͟huṣn-i-Akbar, (Arabic: الغصن الأکبر "The Greater Branch").
- Mihdí: G͟huṣn-i-Athar, (Arabic: الغصن الأطهر "The Purest Branch").
- Badíʻu'lláh: G͟husn-i-Anwar, ("The Most Luminous Branch").

His daughters were given the title of Varaqat (translated from Arabic as "Leaves"). Thus Baháʼu'lláh's eldest daughter, Bahíyyih (given name, Fatimih), was given the title of the Greatest Holy Leaf.

During Baháʼu'lláh's lifetime, he referred to his eldest son, Abbás, by terms such as "Sirru'lláh" (Mystery of God), or "Sarkár-i-Áqá" (the Master). After the death of Baháʼu'lláh, he chose the title "ʻAbdu'l-Bahá" (Servant of Bahá). Baháʼu'lláh did not give his descendants any direct right to the property of others.

=== Aghsán ===
Aghṣán ("Branches") is a term in the literature of the Baháʼí Faith referring to the male descendants of Baháʼu'lláh.

It has particular implications not only for the disposition of endowments but also for the succession of authority following the passing of Baháʼu'lláh and of his son ʻAbdu'l-Bahá.

Baháʼí literature grants a special station to the members of the Aghṣán, indicating that Baháʼís should treat them with particular respect and courtesy, but does not grant them any administrative or spiritual authority within the Baháʼí Faith outside of those selected as successors to Baháʼu'lláh.

== Ásíyih ==
Ásiyih was born in 1820 in the village of Yalrud, Mazandaran. Her father was Mirza Ismaʻil-i-Vazir, a powerful and wealthy Persian nobleman. Baháʼu'lláh addressed her as Navváb and the Most Exalted Leaf. She was chosen, at fifteen, to marry the young Baháʼu'lláh (18) based on her rare beauty, wealth, and piety. The family had pre-existing roots with Baháʼu'lláh's family by virtue of their influence in the royal court, which may have influenced the marriage arrangements. Three years after the elder sister of Baha'u'llah, Sarih Khanum, married Mirza Mahmud, the son of the Vazir-i-Yalrud, she who loved her winsome, vivacious, and beautiful sister-in-law, Ásiyih(15), requested her father, Mirza Buzurg-i-Nuri, to ask for Ásíyih's hand in marriage to Baha'u'llah(18). They married sometime between 24 September and 22 October 1835, in Tehran. Three of their children lived to adulthood. She died in 1886 in ʻAkká, and is buried on Mount Carmel within the vicinity of the Shrine of the Báb. Baháʼu'lláh named her his "perpetual consort" and her son as his vicar. Baháʼís regard the children of Ásíyih and Baháʼu'lláh to be the Baháʼí "holy family". Her children were:

=== ʻAbbas ===
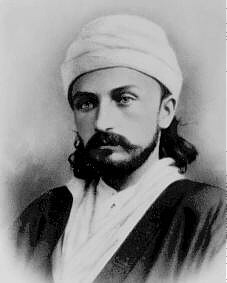
ʻAbbas Effendi

Better known as ʻAbdu'l-Bahá, ʻAbbas was born in 1844 and died in 1921. He was the oldest child of Ásíyih and Baháʼu'lláh. He was variously referred to by Baháʼu'lláh as "Mystery of God", "The Master", "Perfect Exemplar" and "the Most Great Branch". After Baháʼu'lláh died on 29 May 1892, the Will and Testament of Baháʼu'lláh named ʻAbdu'l-Bahá as Centre of the Covenant, successor and interpreter of Baháʼu'lláh's writings. During his time as head of the religion, while still a prisoner of the Ottoman Empire, he met with many pilgrims and was in constant communication with Baháʼís around the world. After the 1908 Young Turks revolution freed all political prisoners in the Ottoman Empire, ʻAbdu'l-Bahá was freed from imprisonment and in 1910, with the freedom to leave the country, he embarked on a three-year journey to Egypt, Europe, and North America, spreading the Baháʼí message. On 27 April 1920, he was awarded a knighthood by the British Mandate of Palestine for his humanitarian efforts during World War I. ʻAbdu'l-Bahá died on 28 November 1921, and he is currently buried within one of the rooms at the Shrine of the Báb.

=== Bahíyyih ===
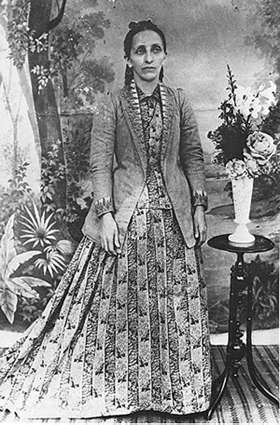
Bahíyyih Khánum in 1895

Bahíyyih Khánum was born in 1846 and was the eldest daughter of Baháʼu'lláh and Ásíyih Khánum. She was entitled the Greatest holy Leaf. She was particularly dear to her father and is seen within the Baháʼí Faith as one of the greatest women to have lived. She stood by and remained faithful to the Centers of the Covenant over years of infighting within Baháʼu'lláh's family that led to the expelling of many of them. She was given the position of acting head of the religion repeatedly when ʻAbdu'l-Bahá (during periods between 1910 and 1913), and Shoghi Effendi (during periods between 1922 and 1924), were absent from the Baháʼí World Centre in Haifa. Shoghi Effendi in particular felt her support during a difficult period following the death of ʻAbdu'l-Bahá. She died on 15 July 1932 and was buried in the Baháʼí gardens downhill from the Baháʼí Arc on Mount Carmel, under the Monument of the Greatest Holy Leaf raised for her at the Baháʼí World Centre.

=== Mihdí ===
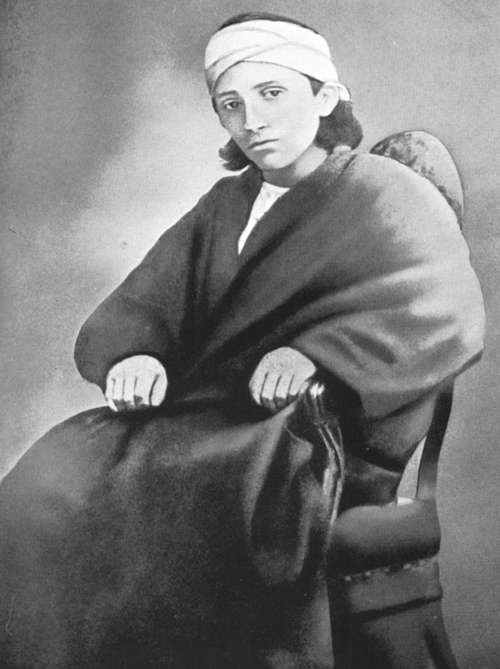
Mírzá Mihdí in 1868

Mírzá Mihdí was born in Tehran in 1848 and was entitled the Purest Branch. He died at the age of 22 on 23 June 1870 in ʻAkká after a fall through a skylight while he was preoccupied in prayer. The death is significant as Baháʼís believe that Baháʼu'lláh offered him the chance of being cured. However, he chose to use his life as a sacrifice so that the close imprisonment of the Baháʼís would end. Mírzá Mihdí was eventually buried alongside his mother in the gardens below the Baháʼí Arc on Mount Carmel in Haifa near his brother and sister.

=== Others ===
Ásíyih bore at least four other children, all sons, but due to their early deaths little is known about them:

- Kázim who died sometime in Persia.
- Sádiq who died aged 3–4.
- ʻAlí Muhammad who died in Mazandaran at the age of 7 in 1852.
- ʻAlí Muhammad who was born and died in Baghdad at the age of 2.

== Fatimih ==
Baha'u'llah's second marriage happened under different circumstances. Fatimih, a first cousin of Baha'u'llah, was born in 1828 in Nur, Mazandaran, and was generally known as Mahd-i-'Ulya. Fatimih was married at fourteen to an influential cleric, Shaykh Muhammad Taqi, titled 'Allamah-i-Nuri in 1842. He was several decades older than she was. She seems to have been widowed shortly afterwards, perhaps aged sixteen. Since Fatimah had no children, she had no claim to her husband's estate and was effectively cast out of his family. According to the custom of the time, a well-established male relative was expected to marry such a widow to preserve her honor and status. Fatimih's mother, Baha'u'llah's paternal aunt, had frequently reminded him of this responsibility, and her brother, Baha'u'llah's uncle, too, agreed. It is reported that Baháʼu'lláh's aunt implored him to wed her widowed daughter, and he reluctantly agreed to do so. They married in 1849 in Tehran. She had six of Baháʼu'lláh's children, of whom four survived to adulthood. She was said to have been very jealous of and harbored great enmity towards ʻAbdu'l-Bahá. She died in 1904 and was later labelled a Covenant-breaker.

Her children are:

=== Samadiyyih ===
Samadiyyih married Majdu'd-Din, who was the son of Aqay-i-Kalim, Baháʼu'lláh's brother; Majdu'd-Din was one of ʻAbdu'l-Bahá's greatest critics, and Samadiyyih and Majdu'd-Din were eventually declared Covenant-breakers. She died at age 49 in 1904/5 and her husband died at over one-hundred years of age in 1955.

=== Muhammad ʻAlí ===
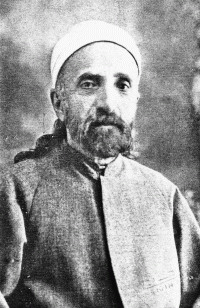
Muhammad ʻAlí

Mírzá Muhammad ʻAlí Effendi was born in Baghdad in 1853. Baháʼu'lláh called him the "Greater Branch" and when Baháʼu'lláh declared ʻAbdu'l-Bahá his successor, he set that Muhammad ʻAlí was next in rank after him. Motivated by jealousy of ʻAbdu'l-Bahá he conspired to undermine his brother's leadership, but he was unable to gain extensive support from the Baháʼís. When ʻAbdu'l-Bahá died, his will went into great detail about how Muhammad ʻAlí had been unfaithful to the Covenant, labelling him a Covenant-breaker, and appointing Shoghi Effendi his successor instead. Muhammad ʻAlí was described by Shoghi Effendi as the "Arch-Breaker of Baháʼu'lláh's Covenant". Muhammad ʻAlí died in 1937. He is buried in one of the two private Bahá'í cemeteries in a square mausoleum covered with a white dome.

=== Ḍíyáʼu'lláh ===
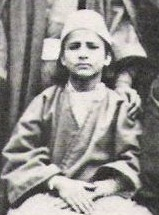
Mírzá Ḍíyáʼu'lláh Effendi

Ḍíyáʼu'lláh (ضياء الله, alternate spelling: Zíyáʼu'lláh) was born August 15, 1864, in Edirne (Adrianople). He swayed in loyalty between his brothers, and was labelled a Covenant-breaker. He married Thurayyá Samandarí, daughter of Shaykh Kázim-i-Samandar and sister of Tarázʼu'lláh Samandarí, a Hand of the Cause of God. The marriage was childless, and according to Samandar's memoirs, Muhammad ʻAlí had prevented her from returning to him. He died on October 30, 1898, in Haifa. Ḍíyáʼu'lláh was initially buried next to his father at the Shrine of Baháʼu'lláh at the Mansion of Bahjí. However, having been declared a Covenant-breaker, Ḍíyáʼu'lláh's remains were later disinterred and moved.

=== Badíʻu'lláh ===
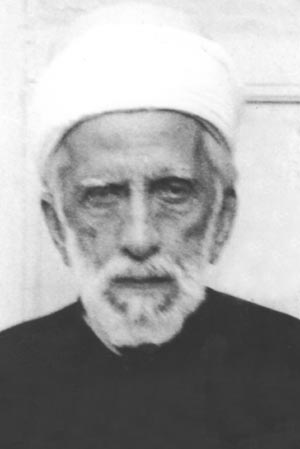
Badi'u'llah

Mírzá Badíʻu'lláh Effendí was born in Adrianople in 1867. His father gave him the title G͟husn-i-Anwar (“The Most Luminous Branch”). For much of his life he supported his brother's challenge to ʻAbdu'l-Bahá's authority as Centre of the Covenant. However, after accumulated a significant financial debt, Badíʻu'lláh rejected Muhammad-ʻAlí in 1903, and delivered his loyalty to ʻAbdu'l-Bahá by circulating an open letter denouncing Muhammad-ʻAlí, known as Badíʻu'lláh's epistle. Then he received support from ʻAbdu'l-Bahá who paid off his debts. But after three months, he resumed open support for Muhammad-ʻAlí informing him of what he had observed while supporting ʻAbdu'l-Bahá. He died in Israel on November 1, 1950.

Badiʻu'llah married Alia Khanum. His daughter Sadhij Bahaa was a militant leader of women's rights in Palestine, and married Najib Nassar.

=== Others ===
Mahd-i-'Ulya bore at least two other children:

- ʻAlí Muhammad who died at the age of 2 in Baghdad.
- Sád͟hijíyyih K͟hánum who was born in Baghdad and died at the age of 2 in Constantinople.

== Gawhar ==
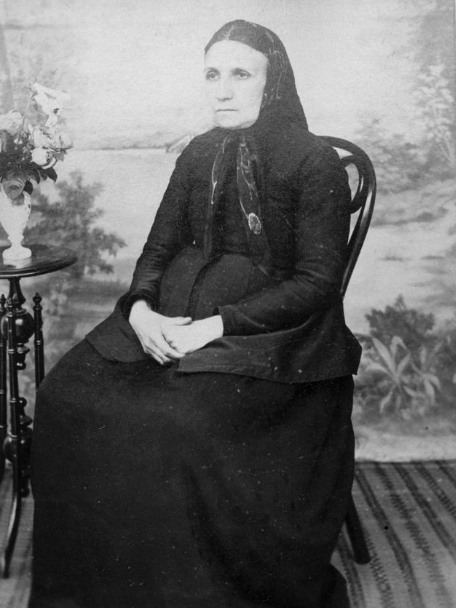
Gawhar Khanum, third wife of Baháʼu'lláh

Gawhar was born in Kashan to a Bábí family of the city. The time, location, and details of Baha'u'llah's third marriage are not very clear. Around 1862, she was brought to Baghdad by her brother Mirza Mihdiy-i-Kashani to serve in Baha'u'llah's household and Ásíyih Khánum. Under Islamic law and social norms, a woman entering a man's household needed to be related either by family or through marriage. Baháʼu'lláh married her sometime around 1862. Sources differ on whether this marriage took place in Baghdad in 1863 or after Gawhar joined him in 'Akka' around 1870. When Baháʼu'lláh left Baghdad in 1863, unlike the other two wives, Gawhar remained in Baghdad. During her time in Baghdad, she stayed and lived with her brother. Shortly afterwards, the Babi-Baháʼí community of Baghdad was rounded up and exiled to Mosul, among them Gawhar and her brother. Her brother wrote many times asking Baháʼu'lláh to allow them to enter Akká, and finally he accepted. Brother and sister arrived in late 1870, but were to live outside the barraks where the rest of Baha'u'llah's family lived. Baháʼu'lláh and Gawhar had one daughter, Furúghíyyih, who was born in ʻAkká in about 1871. Both mother and daughter were declared Covenant-breakers after the death of Baháʼu'lláh. Gawhar died sometime between 1892 and 1921.

=== Furughiyyih ===
Relatively little is known about Furughiyyih. She was married to Siyyid Ali Afnan, the son of the Báb's brother-in-law. She, her husband, and their children (in particular her eldest Nayyir), all sided with Muhammad-ʻAli and were labelled Covenant-breakers. She bore four children:

- Late Hussain Effendi Afnan
- Nayyar Effendi Afnan
- Feyzi Effendi Afnan
- Hassan Effendi Afnan

She died of cancer.

== Plurality of wives ==
Baháʼu'lláh had three concurrent wives, when his religion teaches monogamy, and this has been the subject of criticism. Baháʼí teachings on gender equality and monogamy post-date Baháʼu'lláh's marriages and are understood to be evolutionary in nature, slowly leading Baháʼís away from what had been a deeply rooted cultural practice.

Baháʼu'lláh married his first wife in Tehran when they both were Muslims, and he married his second wife also in Tehran, when he, his first wife, and his new wife were all Bábís and no longer Muslims. According to the laws and tradition of Islam, which Baháʼu'lláh would have been following at the time of his marriages, a man is allowed four wives. Baháʼí marriage laws were written in the Kitáb-i-Aqdas more than ten years after his last marriage. In that book he limits the number of wives to two with no concubines and states that having only one wife would be the cause of tranquility for both partners. This was later interpreted by ʻAbdu'l-Bahá that having a second wife is conditional upon treating both wives with justice and equality, and was not possible in practice, thus establishing monogamy. This interpretation is probably influenced by the equivalent reasoning of some Muslim scholars who interpret the Quran's permissive stance on polygamy - restricted to 4 wives - as indicated in verse 4:3 to be subject of the impossible condition of absolute justice on part of the husband.

=== Baháʼí apologia ===
The general view among Baháʼu'lláh's family and Baháʼís today is that all the wives were legal and equal. The question about how this conforms to religious law is addressed directly in two letters from Universal House of Justice quoting Shoghi Effendi twice:

"Baháʼu'lláh had no concubine. He had three legal wives. As He married them before the "Aqdas" (His book of laws) was revealed, he was only acting according to the laws of Islám, which had not yet been superseded. He made plurality of wives conditional upon justice; ʻAbdu'l-Bahá interpreted this to mean that a man may not have more than one wife at a time, as it is impossible to be just to two or more women in marriage."

"...Baháʼu'lláh married the first and second wives while he was still in Tihrán, and the third wife while he was in Baghdád. At that time, the Laws of the "Aqdas" had not been revealed, and secondly, he was following the Laws of the previous Dispensation and the customs of the people of his own land.".

Baháʼís argue that polygamy is an ancient practice and other religions did not require monogamy. Under the Law of Moses a man could take as many wives as he chose. Most Christian groups have historically not practiced and condemned polygamy; some, however, have advocated it. In the Arabian peninsula Muhammad introduced a limit of four wives; polygamy was unlimited in pre-Islamic Arabia. The Baháʼí Faith slowly introduced monogamy to a region that considered polygamy a righteous lifestyle. Note 89 of the Kitáb-i-Aqdas comments on the verse in question:

"Baháʼu'lláh, who was revealing his teachings in the milieu of a Muslim society, introduced the question of monogamy gradually in accordance with the principles of wisdom and the progressive unfoldment of his purpose. The fact that he left his followers with an infallible interpreter of his writings enabled him to outwardly permit two wives in the Kitáb-i-Aqdas but uphold a condition that enabled ʻAbdu'l-Bahá to elucidate later that the intention of the law was to enforce monogamy."
