= Tablet of the Branch =

The Súrih-i-Ghusn or Tablet of the Branch (Súrih-i-Ghusn) is a tablet written in Arabic by Baháʼu'lláh, founder of the Baháʼí Faith, in Adrianople between 1864 and 1868 CE. It confirms a high station for ʻAbdu'l-Bahá (titled "the Branch of Holiness"). An authorized English translation by the Baháʼí World Centre was published in the volume Days of Remembrance in 2017.

== See also ==
- Kitáb-i-Aqdas
- Lawḥ-i-Arḍ-i-Bá (Tablet of the Land of Bá)
- Kitáb-i-ʻAhd (Book of the Covenant)
