= List of former Baháʼís =

Ex-Baháʼís or former Baháʼís are people who have been a member of the Baháʼí Faith at some time in their lives and later disassociated from it. The following is a list of notable ex-Baháʼís who have either converted to another religion or philosophy, or became non-religious. Baháʼís who are not in good standing, having lost their administrative rights for some transgression, are not considered ex-Baháʼís.

== Converted to Christianity ==
- John Ford Coley (born 1948) - American musician.
- Francis Spataro - Became a follower of Charles Mason Remey. In the later years of his life, he became an archbishop of the Apostolic Episcopal Church and left the Baháʼí Faith altogether.

== Converted to Islam ==
- Abd al-Hosayn Ayati (1871–1953) - Also known as Avarih. He spent 18 years as a Baháʼí travelling teacher and reverted to Shia Islam in 1921.
- Sobhi Fazl'ollah Mohtadi (1897–1962) - Secretary of 'Abdu'l Bahá, who was expelled after opposing the leadership of Shoghi Effendi and later joined a Shia-Sufi Order.

== Others ==
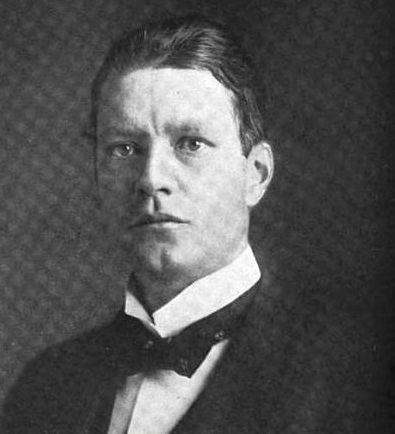
Lewis S. Chanler

- Denis MacEoin (1949–2022) - British academic, Baháʼí from about 1966 to 1980, he departed after disagreements with Baháʼís, mostly due to his research.
- Alden Penner (born 1983) - Canadian musician, left in 2013 after personal differences with other Baháʼís.
- Juan Cole (born 1952) - Having converted to the Baháʼí Faith in 1972, Cole resigned in 1996 and became uninterested in organized religion.
- Gretchen Felker-Martin (born 1989) - American writer raised Baháʼí, later becoming an atheist.

== See also ==
- List of Baháʼís
- List of converts to the Baháʼí Faith
- List of excommunicated Baháʼís
- Covenant-breaker
