= Hermann Zimmer =

Hermann Zimmer was an early pioneer of the Baháʼí Faith in Germany. Zimmer is one of a few Baháʼís who revived the efforts of Ruth White to oppose Shoghi Effendi, claiming that the Will and Testament of ʻAbdu'l-Bahá was forged.

== Opposition ==
Zimmer was a Baháʼí in good standing during World War II, and as a German, traveled to Berlin to unsuccessfully lobby the Nazi government to rescind their ban of the Baháʼí Faith. By 1971, however, he wrote a book titled A Fraudulent Testament Devalues the Baháʼí Religion into Political Shogism, which criticized the Baháʼí administration.

Zimmer based his claims partly on the work of criminologist Charles Ainsworth Mitchell, who Ruth White had hired to review photocopies of the original Will and Testament of ʻAbdu'l-Bahá. Mitchell had compared the photocopies to original samples of ʻAbdu'l-Bahá's handwriting. Mitchell's provisional report indicated that the Will was a forgery, pending inspection of the originals. White later placed Mitchell's signed report with the U.S. Library of Congress in 1930. Mitchell could not read Persian, however, and the claims of a forgery were not taken up by many other Baháʼís opposed to Shoghi Effendi at that time, most notably including Ahmad Sohrab.

Hermann Zimmer remained one amongst a small group of Baháʼís to question the authenticity of ʻAbdu'l-Bahá's Will. Zimmer attempted to establish a group called "Free Baháʼís" or the "World Union of Universal Religion and Universal Peace" along with Charles Seeburger of Philadelphia, but it is not clear that it actually came into being.

== Impact ==
Zimmer's own work was further taken up by Francesco Ficicchia in Der Bahā'ismus-Religion der Zukunft? Geschichte, Lehreund Organisation in kritischer Anfrage, a work which Denis MacEoin notes "did indeed do a lot of damage to the public image of the Baháʼís" in German-speaking Europe and "damaged the Baháʼís and distorted their cause in certain quarters, mainly within the Catholic and Protestant churches." Zimmer and Ficicchia's works were funded and distributed by evangelical Christian organizations in Germany. The work had such a negative impact on the Baháʼí community that a lengthy apologetic response came from Schaefer, Towfigh, and Gollmer in Making the Crooked Straight: A Contribution to Baháʼí Apologetics.

== Works ==
Zimmer, Hermann (January 1, 1973). A Fraudulent Testament Devalues the Bahai Religion into Political Shoghism. World Union for Universal Religion and Universal Peace.

== See also ==
- Baháʼí divisions
- Ahmad Sohrab
- List of excommunicated Baháʼís
