= Attempted schisms in the Baháʼí Faith =

The Baháʼí Faith was formed in the late 19th-century Middle East by Baháʼu'lláh, and teaches that an official line of succession of leadership is part of a divine covenant that assures unity and prevents schism. There are no major schisms in the Baháʼí Faith, and attempts to form alternative leadership have either become extinct with time or have remained in extremely small numbers that are shunned by the majority. The largest extant sect is related to Mason Remey's claim to leadership in 1960, which continued into the 21st century with two or three groups numbering less than 200 collectively, mostly in the United States.

About a dozen efforts have been made to form sects in the history of the Baháʼí Faith. The first major challenge to leadership came after Baháʼu'lláh died in 1892, with ʻAbdu'l-Bahá's half-brother Mírzá Muhammad ʻAlí opposing him. Later, Shoghi Effendi faced opposition from his family, as well as some individual Baháʼís. When Shoghi Effendi passed in 1957, there was no clear successor, and the Hands of the Cause led a transition to the Universal House of Justice, elected in 1963. This transition was opposed by Mason Remey, who claimed to be the successor of Shoghi Effendi in 1960, but was excommunicated by Hands of the Cause because his claim had no basis in authoritative Baháʼí writings. Other, more modern attempts at schism have come from opposition to the Universal House of Justice and attempts to reform or change doctrine.

Those that have been excommunicated are designated as Covenant-breakers by the majority, some of which claim to represent the true Baháʼí Faith. Some Baháʼís have claimed that there have been no divisions in the Baháʼí Faith, or that none will survive or become a threat to the main body of Baháʼís. From 2000 to 2020, twenty individuals were expelled by the Baháʼí Administration for Covenant-breaking.

== ʻAbdu'l-Bahá's ministry ==
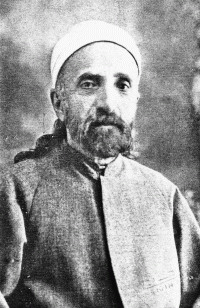
Mírzá Muhammad ʻAlí, half-brother of ʻAbdu'l-Bahá

Baháʼu'lláh remained in the Akka-Haifa area under house arrest until his death in 1892. According to the terms of his will, his eldest son ʻAbdu'l-Bahá was named the centre of authority; Mírzá Muhammad ʻAlí, the eldest son from Baháʼu'lláh's second wife, was assigned a secondary position.

With ʻAbdu'l-Bahá as the head of the Baháʼí community, soon Muhammad ʻAli started working against his elder brother, at first subtly and then in open opposition. Most members of the families of Baháʼu'lláh's second and third wives supported Muhammad ʻAlí; however, there were very few outside of Haifa who followed him.

Muhammad ʻAlí's machinations with the Ottoman authorities resulted in ʻAbdu'l-Bahá's re-arrest and confinement in Acre. They also caused the appointment of two official commissions of inquiry, which almost led to further exile and incarceration of ʻAbdu'l-Baha to North Africa. In the aftermath of the Young Turk revolution, Ottoman prisoners were freed thus ending the danger to ʻAbdu'l-Baha. Meanwhile, Ibrahim George Kheiralla, a Syrian Christian, converted to the Baháʼí Faith, emigrated to the United States and founded the first American Baháʼí community. Initially, he was loyal to ʻAbdu'l-Bahá. With time Kheiralla began teaching that ʻAbdu'l-Baha was the return of Christ, and this was becoming the widespread understanding among the Baháʼís in the United States, despite ʻAbdu'l-Baha's efforts to correct the mistake. Later on, Kheiralla switched sides in the conflict between Baháʼu'lláh's sons and supported Mirza Muhammad ʻAlí. He formed the Society of Behaists, a religious denomination promoting Unitarian Bahaism in the U.S., which was later led by Shua Ullah Behai, son of Mirza Muhammad ʻAlí, after he emigrated to the United States in June 1904 at the behest of his father. Muhammad ʻAlí's supporters either called themselves Behaists or "Unitarian Baháʼís". (Note: Browne, p. 82. The reference appears to be to the unitarian theology of one god, rather than any identification with the American Unitarian Association.) From 1934 to 1937, Behai published Behai Quarterly a Unitarian Bahai magazine written in English and featuring the writings of Muhammad ʻAlí and various other Unitarian Bahais.

ʻAbdu'l-Bahá's response to determined opposition during his tenure was patterned on Baháʼu'lláh's example and evolved across three stages. Initially, like Baháʼu'lláh, he made no public statements but communicated with his brother Muhammad ʻAlí and his associates directly, or through intermediaries, in seeking reconciliation. When it became clear that reconciliation was not possible, and fearing damage to the community, ʻAbdu'l-Bahá wrote to the Baháʼís explaining the situation, identifying the individuals concerned and instructing the believers to sever all ties with those involved. Finally, he sent representatives to those areas most affected by the problem.

The function of these representatives was to explain matters to the Baháʼís and to encourage them to persevere in cutting all contact. Often these chosen individuals would have ʻAbdu'l-Bahá's authority to open up communications with those involved to try to persuade them to return. In Iran, such envoys were principally the four Hands of the Cause appointed by Baháʼu'lláh.

=== Aftermath ===
When ʻAbdu'l-Bahá died, his Will and Testament explained in some detail how Muhammad ʻAlí had been unfaithful to the Covenant, identifying him as a Covenant-breaker and appointing Shoghi Effendi as leader of the Faith with the title of Guardian. Baháʼí authors such as Hasan Balyuzi and Adib Taherzadeh set about refuting the claims of Muhammad ʻAlí. This represented what is often described as the most testing time for the Baháʼí Faith. The Behaists rejected the authority of the Will and Testament of ʻAbdu'l-Bahá, claiming loyalty to the leadership succession as they inferred it from Baha'u'llah's Kitab-i-Ahd.

This schism had very little effect. The claims were rejected by the vast majority of Baháʼís. Muhammad ʻAlí's supporters had mostly abandoned him by the time of his death in 1937. In the ʻAkká area, the followers of Muhammad ʻAlí represented six families at most, they had no common religious activities, and were almost wholly assimilated into Muslim society.

== Shoghi Effendi as Guardian ==
=== Appointment ===
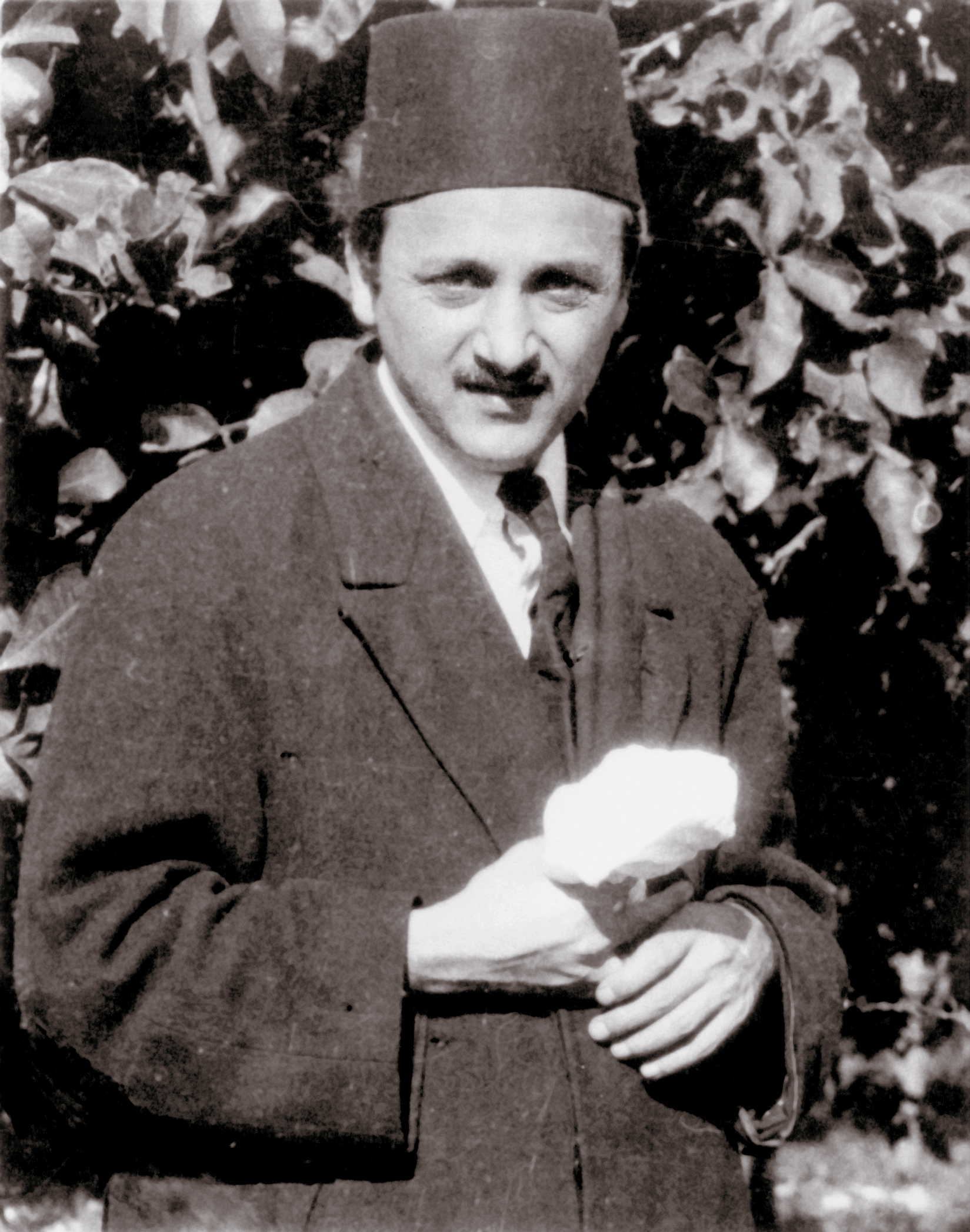
Shoghi Effendi at the time of becoming Guardian in 1921. Taken in Haifa.

At 24, Shoghi Effendi was particularly young when he assumed leadership of the religion in 1921, as provided for by ʻAbdu'l-Bahá in his Will and Testament. He had received a Western education at the Syrian Protestant College and later at Balliol College, Oxford.

At this time Muhammad-ʻAlí revived his claim to leadership of the Baháʼí community. He seized the keys of the Tomb of Baháʼu'lláh at the Mansion of Bahjí, expelled its keeper, and demanded that he be recognized by the authorities as the legal custodian of that property. However, the Palestinian authorities, after having conducted some investigations, instructed the British officer in ʻAkká to deliver the keys into the hands of the keeper loyal to Shoghi Effendi.

=== American disputes ===
After the death of ʻAbdu'l-Bahá, Ruth White questioned the Will's authenticity as early as 1926, and openly opposed Shoghi Effendi's Guardianship, publishing several books on the subject. She wrote a letter to the United States Postmaster General and asked him, among other things, to prohibit the National Spiritual Assembly from "using the United States Mails to spread the falsehood that Shoghi Effendi is the successor of ʻAbdu'l-Bahá and the Guardian of the Cause." She also wrote a letter to the High Commissioner for Palestine; both of these letters were ignored.

Another division occurred primarily within the American Baháʼí community, which increasingly consisted of non-Persians with an interest in alternative spiritual pursuits. Many had been strongly attracted to the personality of ʻAbdu'l-Bahá and the spiritual teachings of the Baháʼí Faith. Some regarded it as an ecumenical society which all persons of goodwill—regardless of religion—might join. When Shoghi Effendi made clear his position that the Baháʼí Faith was an independent religion with its own distinct administration through local and national spiritual assemblies, a few felt that he had overstepped the bounds of his authority. Most prominent among them was a New York group including Mirza Ahmad Sohrab, Lewis and Julia Chanler, who founded the "New History Society", and its youth section, the Caravan of East and West. Sohrab and the Chanlers refused to be overseen by the New York Spiritual Assembly, and were expelled by Shoghi Effendi as Covenant-breakers. They argued that the expulsion was meaningless because they believed the faith could not be institutionalized. The New History Society published several works by Sohrab and Chanler and others. Sohrab accepted the legitimacy of Shoghi Effendi as Guardian, but was critical of the manner of his leadership and the methods of organizing the Baháʼí administration. The New History Society attracted fewer than a dozen Baháʼís, however its membership swelled to several thousand for a time. The New History Society was active until 1959 and is now defunct. The Caravan House, also known as Caravan Institute, later disassociated itself from the Baháʼí Faith, and remained as an unrelated non-profit educational organization.

All of the divisions of this period were short-lived and restricted in their influence.

=== Family members expelled ===
In 1932 Shoghi Effendi's great aunt, Bahíyyih Khánum, died. She was highly respected and had instructed all to follow Shoghi Effendi through several telegrams she had sent around the world announcing the basics of the provisions of ʻAbdu'l-Bahá's will and was witness to the actions relatives took in violation of provisions of the will. Bahíyyih Khánum had devoted much of her life towards protecting the accepted leadership of the Baháʼí Faith and after Shoghi Effendi's appointment there was little internal opposition until after her death when nephews began to openly oppose Shoghi Effendi over Baháʼu'lláh's house in Baghdad. Some family members disapproved of his marriage to a Westerner, Mary Maxwell—daughter of one of the foremost disciples of ʻAbdu'l-Bahá—in 1937. They claimed that Shoghi Effendi introduced innovations beyond the Iranian roots of the Faith. This gradually resulted in his siblings and cousins disobeying his instructions and marrying into the families of Covenant-breakers, many of whom were expelled as Covenant-breakers themselves. However, these disagreements within Shoghi Effendi's family resulted in no attempts to create a schism favouring an alternative leader. At the time of his death in 1957, he was the only remaining male member of the family of Baháʼu'lláh who had not been expelled. Even his own parents had openly fought against him.

== The founding of the Universal House of Justice ==
Shoghi Effendi died in 1957 without explicitly appointing a successor Guardian. He had no children, and during his lifetime all remaining male descendants of Baháʼu'lláh had been excommunicated as Covenant-breakers. He left no will. Shoghi Effendi's appointed Hands of the Cause unanimously voted it was impossible to legitimately recognize and assent to a successor. The Baháʼí community was in a situation not dealt with explicitly in the provisions of the Will and Testament of ʻAbdu'l-Bahá. Furthermore, the Universal House of Justice had not yet been elected, which represented the only Baháʼí institution authorized to adjudicate on matters not covered by the religion's three central figures. To understand the transition following the death of Shoghi Effendi in 1957, an explanation of the roles of the Guardian, the Hands of the Cause, and the Universal House of Justice is useful.

=== Guardianship ===

Other than allusions in the writings of Baháʼu'lláh to the importance of the Aghsán, the role of the Guardian was not mentioned until the reading of the Will and Testament of ʻAbdu'l-Bahá. Shoghi Effendi later expressed to his wife and others that he had no foreknowledge of the existence of the Institution of Guardianship, least of all that he was appointed as Guardian.

ʻAbdu'l-Bahá warned the Baháʼís to avoid the problems caused by his half-brother Muhammad ʻAlí. He stipulated the criteria and form for selecting future Guardians, which was to be clear and unambiguous. His will required that the Guardian appoint his successor "in his own life-time ... that differences may not arise after his [the Guardian's] passing". The appointee was required to be either the first-born son of the Guardian, or one of the Aghsán (literally: Branches; male descendants of Baháʼu'lláh). Finally, ʻAbdu'l-Bahá left a responsibility of ratifying the appointment to nine Hands of the Cause, elected from all of the Hands.

The will also vested authority in the Guardian's appointed assistants, known as the Hands of the Cause, giving them the right to "cast out from the congregation of the people of Bahá" anyone they deem in opposition to the Guardian.

=== Relationship between the Guardianship and the Universal House of Justice ===
The roles of the Guardianship and the Universal House of Justice are complementary, the former providing authoritative interpretation, and the latter providing flexibility and the authority to adjudicate on "questions that are obscure and matters that are not expressly recorded in the Book." The authority of the two institutions was elucidated by ʻAbdu'l-Bahá in his will, saying that rebellion and disobedience towards either the Guardian or the Universal House of Justice, is rebellion and disobedience towards God. Shoghi Effendi went into further detail explaining this relationship in The World Order of Baháʼu'lláh, indicating that the institutions are interdependent.

=== Role of the Hands of the Cause ===
Shortly after Shoghi Effendi's death, the 27 then-living Hands of the Cause deliberated over whether or not they could legitimately consent to any successor. Only two members present could translate between English and Persian. Following these events Time magazine reported that there were debates about two possible candidates for Guardian.

On 25 November 1957, the Hands signed a unanimous proclamation stating that he had died "without having appointed his successor"; that "it is now fallen upon us ... to preserve the unity, the security and the development of the Baháʼí World Community and all its institutions"; and that they would elect from among themselves nine Hands who would "exercise ... all such functions, rights and powers in succession to the Guardian of the Baháʼí Faith ... as are necessary to serve the interests of the Baháʼí World Faith, and this until such time as the Universal House of Justice ... may otherwise determine." This body of nine Hands became known as the Hands of the Cause in the Holy Land, sometimes referred to as the Custodians.

That same day the Hands passed a unanimous resolution that clarified who would have authority over various executive areas. (Note: For their authority, the Custodians referred to the Will and Testament of ʻAbdul-Bahá which states that "the Hands of the Cause of God must elect from their own number nine persons that shall at all times be occupied in the important services in the work of the Guardian of the Cause of God."(Hatcher & Martin 1998, p. 190)(ʻAbdu'l-Bahá 1992, p. 12) See: Rabbani, Ministry of the Custodians, 1992, Letter of 28 May 1960, to all National Spiritual Assemblies (pp. 204-206), Letter of 5 July 1960, to all National Spiritual Assemblies (pp. 208-209), Letter of 7 July 1960, to all Hands of the Cause, Cable of 26 July 1960, to all National Spiritual Assemblies (p.223), and Letter of 15 October 1960, to all National Spiritual Assemblies (pp. 231-236) In addition, the Guardian had written that the Hands had executive authority in carrying out his directives. (Effendi 1982, pp. 82–83)) Among these were:

- "That the entire body of the Hands of the Cause, ... shall determine when and how the International Baháʼí Council shall pass through the successive stages outlined by Shoghi Effendi culminating in the election of the Universal House of Justice."
- "That the authority to expel violators from the Faith shall be vested in the body of nine Hands [the Custodians], acting on reports and recommendations submitted by Hands from their respective continents."

In their deliberations following Shoghi Effendi's passing they determined that they were not in a position to appoint a successor, only to ratify one, so they advised the Baháʼí community that the Universal House of Justice would consider the matter after it was established.

In deciding when and how the International Baháʼí Council would develop into the Universal House of Justice, the Hands agreed to carry out Shoghi Effendi's plans for moving it from the appointed council, to an officially recognized Baháʼí Court, to a duly elected body, and then to the elected Universal House of Justice. In November 1959, referring to the goal of becoming recognized as a non-Jewish religious court in Israel, they said: "this goal, due to the strong trend towards the secularization of Religious Courts in this part of the world, might not be achieved." The recognition as a religious court was never achieved, and the International Baháʼí Council was reformed in 1961 as an elected body in preparation for forming the Universal House of Justice. The Hands of the Cause made themselves ineligible for election to both the council and the Universal House of Justice.

Upon the election of the Universal House of Justice at the culmination of the Ten Year Crusade in 1963, the nine Hands acting as interim head of the religion closed their office.

=== Charles Mason Remey ===
Charles Mason Remey was among the Hands who signed the unanimous proclamations in 1957, acknowledging that Shoghi Effendi had died without having appointed his successor. He was also among the nine Custodians initially elected to serve in the Holy Land as interim head of the religion.

On 8 April 1960, Remey made a written announcement that he was the second Guardian of the Baháʼí Faith and explained his "status for life as commander in chief of Baháʼí affairs of the world" in this proclamation which he requested to be read in front of the annual US convention in Wilmette.

He based his claim on his having been appointed President of the first International Baháʼí Council by Shoghi Effendi in 1951. The appointed council represented the first international Baháʼí body. Remey believed that his appointment as the council's president meant that he was the Guardian of the Baháʼí Faith. The Hands of the Cause wrote regarding his reasoning on this point, "If the President of the International Baháʼí Council is ipso facto the Guardian of the Baháʼí Faith, then the beloved Guardian, himself, Shoghi Effendi would have had to be the President of this first International Baháʼí Council." Remey was appointed president of the council in March 1951, then in December 1951 Remey was appointed a Hand of the Cause. A further announcement in March 1952 appointed several more officers to the Council and Rúhíyyih Khánum as the liaison between the Council and the Guardian.

Regarding the authority of the Hands of the Cause, Remey wrote in his letter that the Hands "have no authority vested in themselves ... save under the direction of the living Guardian of the Faith." He further commanded the Baháʼís to abandon plans for establishing the Universal House of Justice.

Remey never addressed the requirement that Guardians should be male-descendants of Baháʼu'lláh, of whom Remey was not. His followers later referred to letters and public statements of ʻAbdu'l-Bahá calling him "my son" as evidence that he had been implicitly adopted but these claims were almost universally rejected by the body of the Baháʼís.

In response, and after having made many prior efforts to convince Remey to withdraw his claim, the Custodians took action and sent a cablegram to the National Spiritual Assemblies on 26 July 1960. Two days later, the Custodians sent Mason Remey a letter informing him of their unanimous decision to declare him a Covenant-breaker. They cited the Will and Testament of ʻAbdul-Bahá, the unanimous joint resolutions of 25 November 1957, and their authority in carrying out the work of the Guardian as their justification. Anyone who accepted Remey's claim to the Guardianship was also expelled. In a 9 August 1960 letter to the other Hands, the Custodians seem to acknowledge that Remey was not senile or unbalanced, but he was carrying out a "well thought out campaign" to spread his claim.

=== Decision of the Universal House of Justice ===
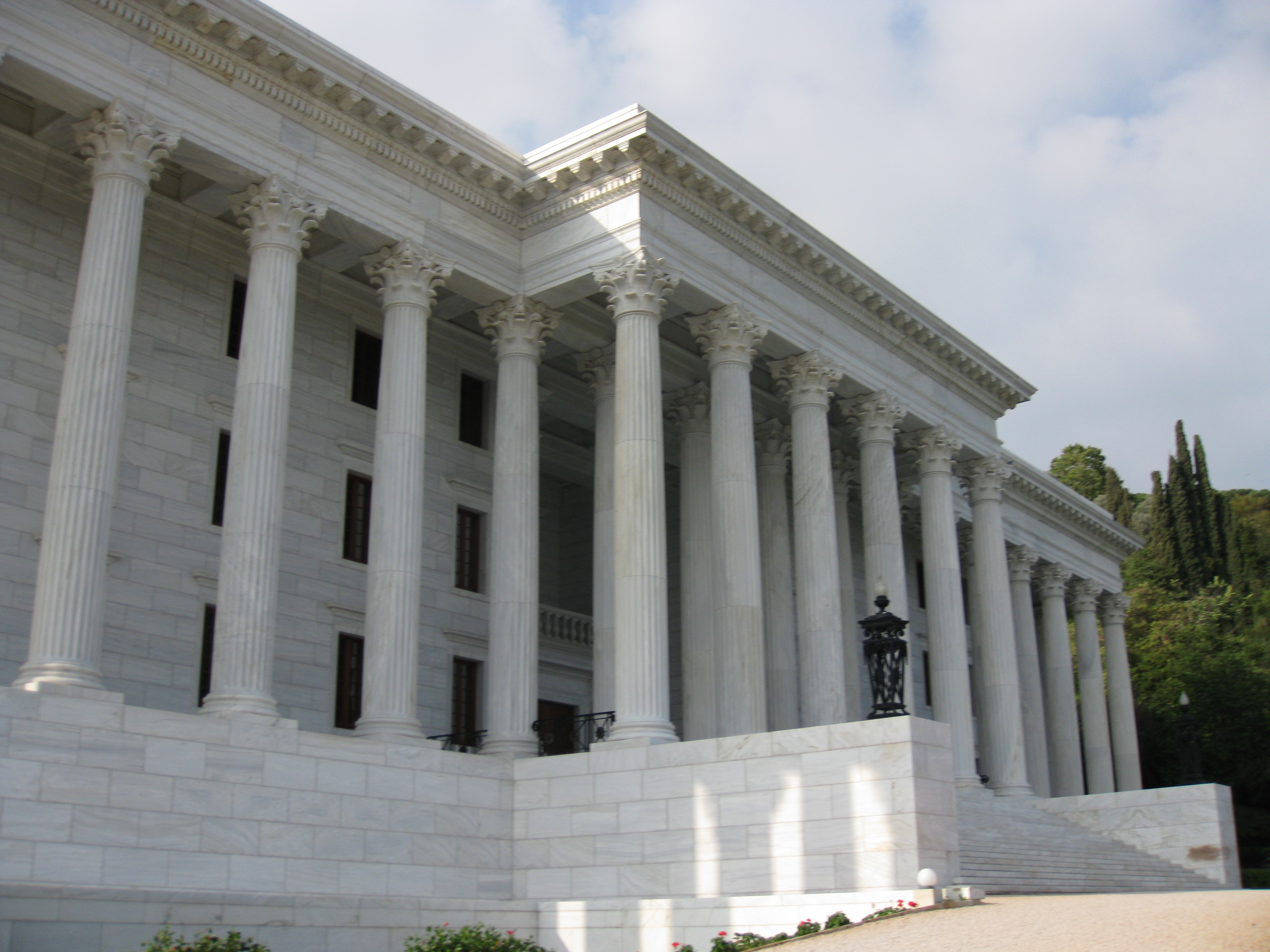
The Universal House of Justice was first elected in 1963. Its seat (pictured) was constructed in 1982.

The Baháʼí institutions and believers around the world pledged their loyalty to the Hands of the Cause, who dedicated the next few years to completing Shoghi Effendi's Ten Year Crusade, culminating with the election of the Universal House of Justice in 1963. It was at this time the Custodians officially passed their authority as the head of the Faith to the Universal House of Justice, which soon announced that it could not appoint or legislate to make possible the appointment of a second Guardian to succeed Shoghi Effendi.

A short time later it elaborated on the situation in which the Guardian would die without being able to appoint a successor, saying that it was an obscure question not covered by Baháʼí scriptures, that no institution or individual at the time could have known the answer, and that it therefore had to be referred to the Universal House of Justice, whose election was confirmed by references in Shoghi Effendi's letters that after 1963 the Baháʼí world would be led by international plans under the direction of the Universal House of Justice.

=== A break in the line of Guardians ===
Mason Remey and his successors asserted that a living Guardian is essential for the Baháʼí community, and that the Baháʼí writings required it. The basis of these claims were almost universally rejected by the body of the Baháʼís, for whom the restoration of scripturally sanctioned leadership of the Universal House of Justice proved more attractive than the claims of Mason Remey.

The House commented that its own authority was not dependent on the presence of a Guardian, and that its legislative functioning was unaffected by the absence of a Guardian. It stated that in its legislation it would be able to turn to the mass of interpretation left by Shoghi Effendi. The Universal House of Justice addressed this issue further early after its election clarifying that "there is nowhere any promise or guarantee that the line of Guardians would endure forever; on the contrary there are clear indications that the line could be broken." (Note: The Universal House of Justice specifically refers to paragraph 42 of the Kitáb-i-Aqdas as evidence that Baháʼu'lláh anticipated that the line of Guardians was not guaranteed forever by providing for the disposition of the religion's endowments in the absence of the Aghsán.(Taherzadeh 1992, p. 390) See also Notes 66 and 67 of the Kitáb-i-Aqdas, pp. 196-197.)

== Mason Remey as second Guardian ==
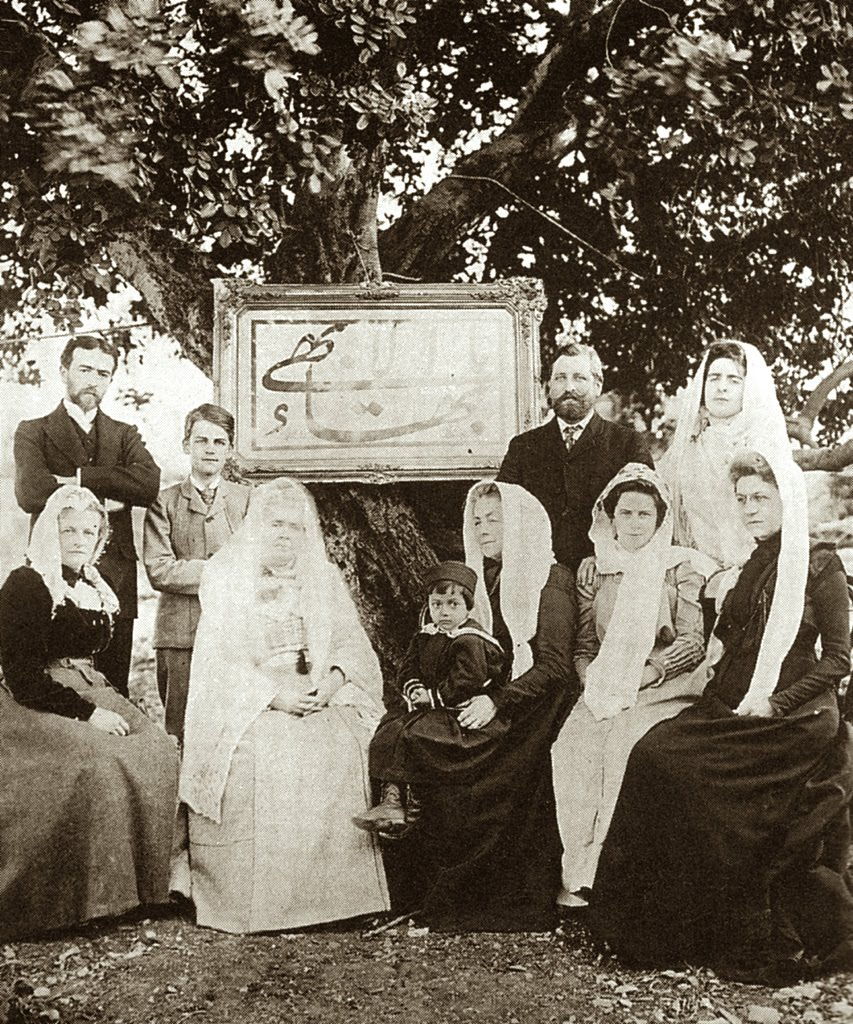
Early Western Baháʼí pilgrims. Charles Mason Remey is standing on the left.

All Baháʼís who professed belief in Mason Remey as the second Guardian implicitly did not accept the Universal House of Justice established in 1963, and are shunned by members of the mainstream Baháʼí Faith. Likewise, Remey at one point declared that the Hands of the Cause were Covenant-breakers, that they lacked any authority without a Guardian, that those following them "should not be considered Baháʼís", and that the Universal House of Justice that they helped elect in 1963 was not legitimate.

Remey attracted about 100 followers in the United States and a few others in Pakistan and Europe. Remey maintained his claim to Guardianship, and went on to establish what came to be known as the Orthodox Baháʼís Under the Hereditary Guardianship, which later broke into several other divisions based on succession disputes within the groups that followed Remey. Although initially disturbing, the mainstream Baháʼís paid little attention to his movement within a few years. As of 2006 his followers represent two or three groups that maintain little contact with each other, comprising at most a few hundred members collectively.

Initially, Remey had followers in Pakistan, India, the United States, and parts of Europe. He settled in Florence, Italy, until the end of his life. From there he appointed three local spiritual assemblies in Santa Fe, New Mexico, Rawalpindi, Pakistan, and Lucknow, India, then organized the election of two National Assemblies – in the United States and Pakistan.

In 1964 the Santa Fe assembly filed a lawsuit against the National Spiritual Assembly (NSA) of the Baháʼís of the United States to receive the legal title to the Baháʼí House of Worship in Illinois, and all other property owned by the NSA. The NSA counter-sued and won. The Santa Fe assembly lost the right to use the term "Baháʼí" in printed material. Remey then changed the name of his sect from "Baháʼís Under the Hereditary Guardianship" to "Abha World Faith" and also referred to it as the "Orthodox Faith of Baháʼu'lláh". In 1966, Remey asked the Santa Fe assembly to dissolve, as well as the second International Baháʼí Council that he had appointed with Joel Marangella, residing in France, as president.

Beginning in 1966-67, Remey was abandoned by almost all of his followers. The followers of Mason Remey were not organized until several of them began forming their own groups based on different understandings of succession, even before his death in 1974. The majority of them claimed that Remey was showing signs of senility. The small Baháʼí sects that adhere to Remey as Guardian are now largely confined to the United States, and have no communal religious life.

=== Orthodox Baháʼí Faith ===
In 1961 Joel Marangella received a letter from Remey, and a note that, "in or after 1963. You will know when to break the seal." In 1964 Remey appointed members to a second International Baháʼí Council with Marangella as president, significant due to Remey's claim to Guardianship being based on the same appointment. In 1965 Remey activated the council, and in 1966 wrote letters passing the "affairs of the Faith" to the council, then later dissolving it. In 1969 Marangella made an announcement that the letter of 1961 was Remey's appointment of him as the third Guardian, and that he had been the Guardian since 1964, invalidating Remey's pronouncements from that point forward.

Marangella gained the support of most of Remey's followers, who came to be known as Orthodox Baháʼís. Membership data is scarce. One source estimated them at no more than 100 members in 1988, and the group claimed a United States membership of about 40 in a 2007 court case. Joel Marangella died in San Diego, California on 1 September 2013. An unverified website claiming to represent Orthodox Baháʼís indicates followers in the United States and India, and a fourth Guardian named Nosrat’u’llah Bahremand.

=== Harvey, Soghomonian, and Yazdani ===
Donald Harvey was appointed by Remey as "Third Guardian" in 1967. He did not use a formal name but "Universal Faith and Revelation of Baháʼu'lláh" and "Baháʼís loyal to the fourth Guardian" have been used to describe Harvey's attempted leadership. Donald Harvey never gained much of a following.

Francis Spataro of New York City, who supported Donald Harvey's claim as Remey's successor, independently organized "The Remey Society" after losing favor with Harvey. Spataro had a newsletter with about 400 recipients and in 1987 published a biography of Charles Mason Remey. In 1995 Francis Spataro became an Old Catholic priest and left the Baháʼí religion altogether.

After Harvey's death in 1991, Jacques Soghomonian of Marseilles announced that he had been appointed by Harvey as the next Guardian. Soghomonian died in 2013 and passed the successorship to E. S. Yazdani. It is unclear if this chain of leadership represents more than a few individuals.

=== Leland Jensen ===
Leland Jensen accepted Remey's claim to the Guardianship and later left the group. In 1969 he was convicted of "a lewd and lascivious act" for sexually molesting a 15-year-old female patient, and he served four years of a twenty-year sentence in the Montana State Prison. It was in prison that Jensen converted several inmates to his ideas of being what he called the "Establisher" of the Baháʼí Faith. After being paroled in 1973 and before Remey's death, Jensen formed an apocalyptic cult called the Baháʼís Under the Provisions of the Covenant (BUPC). Membership in his group peaked at 150-200 leading up to Jensen's prophecy of a nuclear holocaust for 29 April 1980, but the disconfirmation caused most of his followers to abandon him.

Jensen's chosen successor to the Guardianship was Remey's adopted son Pepe, a role that Pepe rejected, and Jensen died in 1996 with ambiguous leadership for his few remaining followers, who fractured in 2001 when one of them claimed to be the Guardian. Adherents were mostly concentrated in Montana.

=== Reginald ("Rex") King ===
Rex King was elected to Remey's NSA of the United States with the most votes, and soon came into conflict with Remey. In 1969 he traveled to Italy with the hope of having Remey pass affairs over to him, but instead was labeled with the "station of satan". King then encouraged Marangella to open the sealed letter from Remey and supported his claim, but soon took issue with the way Marangella was interpreting scripture. King rejected all claimants to the Guardianship after Shoghi Effendi including Remey. He claimed that he, Rex King, was a "regent" pending the emergence of the second Guardian who was in "occultation". Hardly anyone followed King. He called his group the Orthodox Baháʼí Faith under the Regency. King died in 1977 and appointed four of his family as a council of regents, who later changed their name to "Tarbiyat Baha'i Community". There are no size estimates from independent sources, but they maintain a website and appear to be a small group of mostly Rex King's family that maintained some activity into the early 2000s.

=== Size and demographics ===
The following quotes from various sources describe the relative size and demographics of those who followed Mason Remey.

...the Orthodox Baha'i Faith, a group that claims to have active centers in Great Britain, Germany, Pakistan and the United States.

— Anita Fussell, writing for the Lincoln Journal Star (18 March 1973), "Orthodox Baha'i: A Minority Viewpoint"

It is impossible to say how many [BUPC] believers there were on the eve of April 29, 1980, but roughly 150 people in Montana, Wyoming, Colorado, and Arkansas made plans to enter fallout shelters ... On the night of April 28, about eighty believers met at a potluck feast in Missoula for the last time before Armageddon ... On May 16 the Missoula group finally gathered for its first feast since April 29. Thirty-six believers attended ... almost all the believers outside of Montana eventually rejected [Leland Jensen]'s teachings. Everyone in the Arkansas group defected, as did most of the believers in Colorado and Wyoming. To our knowledge, only three members of the Colorado group remained steadfast by the end of the summer, and possibly two in Wyoming ... the size of [Leland Jensen]'s active following remains small [in 1982].

— Balch et al., "When the Bombs Drop" (April 1983)

Remey died in 1974, having appointed a third Guardian, but the number of adherents to the Orthodox faction remains extremely small. Although successful in Pakistan, the Remeyites seem to have attracted no followers in Iran. Other small groups have broken away from the main body from time to time, but none of these has attracted a sizeable following.

— Denis MacEoin, "Bahai and Babi Schisms" (1988)

They call themselves Orthodox Bahais, and their following is small – a mere 100 members, with the largest congregation, a total of 11, living in Roswell, N.M.

— Nancy Ryan, writing for the Chicago Tribune (10 June 1988)

Rejected by his fellow Hands and the overwhelming majority of Bahá'ís, Remey was expelled from the Bahá'í Faith. Nevertheless, his claim did gain significant minority support in some countries, notably France, the United States and Pakistan. However, Remey's followers soon became divided into a number of antagonistic factions, and by the time of his death (in 1974), the number of Bahá'ís who recognized his claims had greatly diminished. A few Remeyite splinter-groups continue to operate in the United States.

— Momen & Smith, "The Bahá'í Faith 1957-1988" (1989)

Remey succeeded in gathering a few supporters, mainly in the United States, France, and Pakistan ... The followers of Remey have decreased in importance over the years, especially as they fragmented into contending factions ... [the group led by Joel Marangella] number no more than one hundred ... Small Remeyite groups are now confined to a few states in the United States.

— Moojan Momen, "The Covenant, and Covenant-breaker" (1995)

By the end of the 1970s Jensen also had attracted followers in Wyoming, Colorado, and Arkansas. Since 1980 membership in the BUPC has fluctuated considerably, but it probably never exceeded 200 nationwide, despite Jensen's claims of having thousands of followers around the world. In 1994, the last year for which we have a membership list, there were only sixty-six members in Montana and fewer than twenty in other states. The Wyoming and Arkansas contingents disbanded after the 1980 disconfirmation, but new groups were formed in Minnesota and Wisconsin... By 1990 the group probably had fewer than 100 members nationwide ... the defection rate accelerated in the 1990s.

— Balch et al., "Fifteen Years of Failed Prophecy" (Routledge, 1997)

There are a few hundred Americans who claim to follow Mason Remey.

— Peter Terry, "Truth Triumphs" (1999)

Mason Remey gained the support of a small but widespread group of Baháʼís for his claim to be the second Guardian of the Faith (1960). Most of his long-term followers were Americans.

— Peter Smith, Concise Encyclopedia of the Baháʼí Faith (2000)

Some American believers ... followed Remey ... When Remey died, several of his lieutenants vied for the position of "third" Guardian, dividing his followers into numerous sects, none of which have grown ... [no Baháʼí schism] has succeeded in garnering substantial support, with most groups eventually dying out altogether.

— Michael McMullen, The Baháʼí: The Religious Construction of a Global Identity (2000)

Total membership in the various Remeyite groups numbers only in the thousands.

— William Garlington, Baha'i Faith in America (2005)

...the Baha'i Under the Provisions of the Covenant ... is headquartered in Missoula, Montana, and claims a membership approaching 150,000, although this is almost certainly an exaggeration.

— Carol Matthews, New Religions (2005)

[Remey] acquired 100 followers in the United States, some dozens in Pakistan, and a score in Europe ... The Remey movement continues to this day as two or three groups that maintain little contact with each other, are active on the World Wide Web, and probably comprise a few hundred members collectively.

— Gallagher & Ashcraft, Introduction to New and Alternative Religions in America (2006)

...the [Orthodox Baháʼí Faith] in the United States is a very small religious community, composed of only about forty persons.

— Jeffrey A. Goldberg, Attorney for Orthodox Baháʼí Faith Respondents, "Orthodox Baháʼí Respondents' Surreply Memorandum" to court filing (28 June 2007)

About 15 Baháʼís initially followed Remey and were accordingly themselves declared Covenant breakers.

— Hugh C. Adamson, The A to Z of the Baháʼí Faith (2009)

The National Assembly of France and about 100 others followed Remey.

— Manya Brachear, writing for the Chicago Tribune (18 May 2009), "When religion splits, courts get a rare say"

...the Orthodox Baháʼí Faith has perhaps 100 members, and the various other groups together probably total another 100 at most.

— Robert Stockman, A Guide to the Perplexed (2013)

...the exiled Baha'is constitute only 5000 to 8000 Baha'is worldwide according to some estimates. Some consider even those numbers to be excessively exaggerated.

— Vernon Johnson, citing Susan Maneck and Karen Bacquet posting in discussion forum talk.religion.bahai, Baha'is in Exile (2020)

Today the Baháʼí community has some 5 million members; the Orthodox Baháʼí Faith perhaps 100; and the Baháʼís Under the Provisions of the Covenant several dozen, who are in turn divided into two sects, one of which appears to be inactive.

— Robert Stockman, The Baháʼí Faith, Violence, and Non-Violence (2020)

== Other Baháʼí divisions ==
=== Free Baháʼís ===
The term Free Baháʼís has been used by or about a small number of Baháʼís that have rejected the authority of Shoghi Effendi.

The term was first used by Hermann Zimmer, who revived the earlier claims of Ruth White that the Will and Testament of ʻAbdu'l-Bahá was forged. White's claim was widely rejected by other Baháʼís of the time, including Baháʼís who, like her, were enemies of Shoghi Effendi. White was able to gather the support of a single Baháʼí in Germany, Wilhelm Herrigel, who took up her cause; only a few Western Baháʼís followed him, and most repudiated him following his death in 1932.

Zimmer wrote a polemic attacking the Baháʼí administration in 1971, entitled A Fraudulent Testament Devalues the Baháʼí Religion into Political Shogism, which was widely distributed by Evangelical Protestant organizations in Germany, and later translated into English and distributed worldwide.

Zimmer made plans with Charles Seeburger, a similarly minded individual in Philadelphia, to establish a group of "Free Baháʼís" or the "World Union of Universal Religion and Universal Peace", but the idea soon went defunct.

=== Frederick Glaysher ===
Frederick Glaysher of Michigan left the mainstream Bahá’í community in 1996 and wrote critically of the Bahá’í administration. In 2004, he initiated several websites dedicated to an exposition of the Bahá’í teachings which excoriated the administration from Shoghi Effendi onward. He claimed to have been inspired by Ruth White, Mirza Ahmad Sohrab, and others. Aiming to initiate the same kind of reformation that Martin Luther did when his "95 Theses" sparked the Protestant Reformation, Glaysher launched his appeal by advancing "95 Theses of the Reform Bahá’í Faith". He briefly had a follower in India in the 2000s and some followers in New Zealand in the late 2000s and early 2010s. Glaysher delivered a talk to an interfaith group in Troy, Michigan in 2012, and the movement appears to have gone defunct soon after.

=== The Man ===
"The House of Mankind and the Universal Palace of Order" followed Jamshid Ma'ani and John Carré, but appears now to be defunct. In the early 1970s a Persian man named Jamshid Ma'ani claimed he was "The Man", a new Manifestation of God. He gained a few dozen Iranian Baháʼí followers. John Carré heard of Ma'ani, and wrote a book trying to get other Baháʼís to accept a new, third Manifestation. Carré invited Ma'ani to live in his home in California, but soon concluded, after living with him for four months, that he was not at all godly or spiritual, and certainly was not a Manifestation of God. Ma'ani went back to Iran, and Carré ended all association with him.

== See also ==
- Baháʼí–Azali split
- List of excommunicated Baháʼís
