= Covenant-breaker =

Person expelled from the Baháʼí community

Covenant-breaker is a term used in the Baháʼí Faith to refer to a person who has been excommunicated from the Baháʼí community for breaking the Covenant of Baháʼu'lláh, meaning actively promoting schism in the religion or otherwise opposing the legitimacy of the chain of succession of leadership. Excommunication among Baháʼís is extremely rare and not used for transgressions of community standards, intellectual dissent, or conversion to other religions. Instead, it is the most severe punishment, reserved for suppressing organized dissent that threatens the unity of believers.

Currently, the Universal House of Justice has the sole authority to declare a person a Covenant-breaker, and once identified, all Baháʼís are expected to shun them. The Baháʼí writings forbid association with Covenant-breakers and Baháʼís are urged to avoid their literature, thus providing an exception to the Baháʼí principle of independent investigation of truth.

Dr. Mikhail Sergeev (Note: Sergeev is a professor of religion and philosophy at the University of the Arts in Philadelphia and also Temple University. He also co-chairs and serves on the faculty of the Department of Religion, Philosophy, and Theology at a Baha'i Institute.) wrote about the Baháʼí practice of excommunication,

In dealing with organized dissent, and covenant-breaking as the most radical form of opposition, Baháʼís stand, as they do on many other controversial issues, somewhere between modernity and traditional religions. They are not as tolerant as the adherents of the Enlightenment ideology that institutionalizes opposition. Nor do they crush it as harshly as the fervent religious leaders of the past.

The three largest attempts at alternative leadership—whose followers are considered Covenant-breakers—were from Subh-i-Azal, Mírzá Muhammad ʻAlí, and Charles Mason Remey. Others were declared Covenant-breakers for actively opposing or disobeying the head of the religion, or maliciously attacking the Baháʼí administration after leaving it.

Baháʼís are required to carefully observe the civil rights of Covenant-breakers, to avoid hatred toward them and not to hurt their feelings, but rather to pray for them. Covenant-breakers who change their beliefs may be readmitted to the Baháʼí community.

== Definition ==
Covenant-breaking does not refer to attacks from non-Baháʼís or former Baháʼís. Rather, it is in reference to internal campaigns of opposition where the Covenant-breaker is seen as challenging the unity of the Baháʼí Faith, causing internal division, or by claiming or supporting an alternate succession of authority or administrative structure. The central purpose of the covenant is to prevent schism and dissension.

In a letter to an individual dated 23 March 1975, the Universal House of Justice wrote:

When a person declares his acceptance of Baháʼu'lláh as a Manifestation of God he becomes a party to the Covenant and accepts the totality of His Revelation. If he then turns round and attacks Baháʼu'lláh or the Central Institution of the Faith he violates the Covenant. If this happens every effort is made to help that person to see the illogicality and error of his actions, but if he persists he must, in accordance with the instructions of Baháʼu'lláh Himself, be shunned as a Covenant-breaker.

The term Covenant-breaker (Arabic: ناقضين) was first used by ʻAbdu'l-Bahá during his ministry to describe partisans of his half-brother Mírzá Muhammad ʻAlí, who challenged his leadership, although the concept of expulsion from the community of believers and avoidance of contact with them is rooted in the direct instruction and practices of Baháʼu'lláh. In ʻAbdu'l-Bahá's Will and Testament, he appointed Shoghi Effendi as the first Guardian, defined it as an institution, and also called for the election of the Universal House of Justice. ʻAbdul-Bahá defined in the same manner opposition to these two institutions as Covenant-breaking and advised all Baháʼís to shun anyone opposing the Covenant: "...one of the greatest and most fundamental principles of the Cause of God is to shun and avoid entirely the Covenant-breakers, for they will utterly destroy the Cause of God, exterminate His Law and render of no account all efforts exerted in the past."

== Categorization ==
=== Included categories of people ===
Most Covenant-breakers are involved in schismatic groups, but not always. For example, a Baháʼí who refuses to follow guidance on treatment of Covenant-breakers is at risk of being named one. One article originally written for the Baháʼí Encyclopedia, characterized Covenant-breakers that have emerged in the course of Baháʼí history as belonging to one of four categories:

1. Leadership challenge: These are persons who dispute the authority and legitimacy of the head of the religion and advance claims either for themselves or for another. The main examples of these are Mírzá Muhammad ʻAlí and Charles Mason Remey.
2. Dissidence: Those who actively disagree with the policies and actions of the head of the faith without, however, advancing an alternative claim for leadership. This group consisted mostly of opponents of the Baháʼí administration such as Ruth White, Julia Lynch Olin and Mirza Ahmad Sohrab.
3. Disobedience: Those who disobey certain direct instructions from the head of the religion. Mostly the instruction in question is to cease to associate with a Covenant-breaker. Examples of this type include most of the descendants of ʻAbdu'l-Bahá during Shoghi Effendi's time.
4. Apostates who maliciously attack the Baháʼí Faith. Examples include Ávárih, Sobhi and Níkú.

=== Excluded categories of people ===
Shoghi Effendi wrote to the National Spiritual Assembly of Canada in 1957:

People who have withdrawn from the Cause because they no longer feel that they can support its Teachings and Institutions sincerely, are not Covenant-breakers -- they are non-Baháʼís and should just be treated as such. Only those who ally themselves actively with known enemies of the Faith who are Covenant-breakers, and who attack the Faith in the same spirit as these people, can be considered, themselves, to be Covenant-breakers.

Beyond this, many other relationships to the Baháʼí Faith exist, both positive and negative. Covenant-breaking does not apply to most of them. The following is a partial list of those who could not rightly be termed Covenant-breakers:

- Members of other religions or no religion—with or without any particular relationship to the Baháʼí Faith.
- Baháʼís who simply leave the religion. (see above)
- Baháʼís who, in the estimation of the head of the religion have insufficiently understood the nature of the covenant from the start. These are sometimes "disenrolled" and are considered to have never actually been Baháʼís, given their fundamental diversion from this core Baháʼí doctrine.

=== Bábís ===
Bábís are generally regarded as another religion altogether and not necessarily seen as covenant-breakers, since strictly speaking covenant-breaking presumes that one has submitted oneself to a covenant and then broken it. As Bábís never recognized or swore allegiance to Baháʼu'lláh, they are not Covenant-breakers of Baháʼu'lláh's covenant.

Shoghi Effendi did inform Baháʼís that they should avoid contact with followers and descendents of Subh-i-Azal, Baháʼu'lláh's half-brother, on the basis of Azal's attempts to poison him, and his followers' active opposition to Baháʼís, writing that "No intelligent and loyal Baha'i would associate with a descendant of Azal, if he traced the slightest breath of criticism of our Faith, in any aspect, from that person. In fact these people should be strenuously avoided as having an inherited spiritual disease -- the disease of Covenant-breaking!".

== Shoghi Effendi's immediate family ==
Through the influence of Bahíyyih Khánum, the eldest daughter of Baháʼu'lláh, everyone in the household initially rallied around Shoghi Effendi after the death of ʻAbdu'l-Bahá. For several years his brother Husayn and several cousins served him as secretaries. The only ones publicly opposing him were Mírzá Muhammad ʻAlí and his followers, who were declared Covenant-breakers by ʻAbdu'l-Bahá. Contrary to ʻAbdu'l-Bahá's specific instruction, certain family members established illicit links with those whom ʻAbdu'l-Bahá had declared Covenant-breakers. After Bahíyyih Khánum died in 1932, Shoghi Effendi's eldest sister – Ruhangiz – married Nayyer Effendi Afnan, a son of Siyyid Ali Afnan, stepson of Baháʼu'lláh though Furughiyyih. The children of Furughiyyih sided with Muhammad ʻAlí and opposed ʻAbdu'l-Bahá, leaving only ʻAbdu'l-Bahá's own children as faithful among the descendants of Baháʼu'lláh. Moojan Momen describes these events as follows:

All remained quiescent until the late 1930s when the case of the House of Bahá'u'lláh (q.v.) arose in Iraq. Shoghi Effendi asked Husayn Afnán (d. 1952), the son of Sayyid `Alí, to resign a high post that he held with the Iraqi government so that he would not be placed in the position of endorsing that government's actions in the case. Husayn refused and was expelled; one-by-one his brothers Faydí, Hasan, and Nayyir (Nayyir-`Alí, d. 1952) were also expelled. Events then proceeded rapidly. A series of marriages, engineered, according to Shoghi Effendi (MB), by Nayyir, occurred, linking the grandchildren of `Abdu'l-Bahá with the expelled sons of Sayyid `Alí Afnán.

These marriages caused Ruhangiz, Mehrangiz, and Thurayyá to be declared Covenant-breakers by Shoghi Effendi, though there was some delay and concealment initially in order to avoid public degradation of the family. On 2 November 1941 Shoghi Effendi sent two cables announcing the expulsion of Túbá and her children Ruhi, Suhayl, and Fu'ad for consenting to the marriage of Thurayyá to Faydi. There was also mention that Ruhi's visit to America and Fu'ad's visit to England were without approval. In December 1941 he announced the expulsion of his sister Mehrangiz.

=== Expulsions ===
In 1944 Shoghi Effendi announced the expulsion of Munib Shahid, the grandson of ʻAbdu'l-Bahá's through Ruha, for marrying into the family of an enemy of the Baháʼís. In April 1945, he announced the expulsion of Husayn Ali, his brother, for joining the other Covenant-breakers. In 1950 Shoghi Effendi sent another cable expelling the family of Ruha, another daughter of ʻAbdu'l-Bahá for showing "open defiance", and in December 1951 he announced a "fourth alliance" of members of the family of Siyyid Ali marrying into Ruha's family, and that his brother Riaz was included among the Covenant-breakers.

In 1953 he cabled about Ruhi Afnan corresponding with Mirza Ahmad Sohrab, selling property of Baháʼu'lláh, and publicly "misrepresenting the teachings and deliberately causing confusion in minds of authorities and the local population".

== Resultant groups ==
Most of the groups regarded by the larger group of Baháʼís as Covenant-breakers originated in the claims of Charles Mason Remey to the Guardianship in 1960. The Will and Testament of ʻAbdu'l-Bahá states that Guardians should be lineal descendants of Baháʼu'lláh, that each Guardian must select his successor during his lifetime, and that the nine Hands of the Cause of God permanently stationed in the Holy Land must approve the appointment by majority vote. Baháʼís interpret lineal descendency to mean physical familial relation to Baháʼu'lláh, of which Mason Remey was not.

Almost all of Baháʼís accepted the determination of the Hands of the Cause that upon the death of Shoghi Effendi, he died "without having appointed his successor". There was an absence of a valid descendant of Baháʼu'lláh who could qualify under the terms of ʻAbdu'l-Bahá's will. Later the Universal House of Justice, initially elected in 1963, made a ruling on the subject that it was not possible for another Guardian to be appointed.

In 1960 Remey, a Hand of the Cause himself, retracted his earlier position, and claimed to have been coerced. He claimed to be the successor to Shoghi Effendi. He and the small number of people who followed him were expelled from the mainstream Baháʼí community by the Hands of the Cause. Those close to Remey claimed that he went senile in old age, and by the time of his death he was largely abandoned, with his most prominent followers fighting amongst themselves for leadership.

The largest group of the remaining followers of Remey, members of the "Orthodox Baháʼí Faith", believe that legitimate authority passed from Shoghi Effendi to Mason Remey to Joel Marangella. They, therefore, regard the Universal House of Justice in Haifa, Israel to be illegitimate, and its members and followers to be Covenant-breakers.

In 2009, Jeffery Goldberg and Janice Franco, both from the mainstream Baháʼí community, joined the Orthodox Baháʼí Faith. Both of them were declared as Covenant-breakers and shunned. Goldberg's wife was told to divorce her husband.

The present descendants of expelled members of Baháʼu'lláh's family have not specifically been declared Covenant-breakers, though they mostly do not associate themselves with the Baháʼí religion.

A small group of Baháʼís in Northern New Mexico believe that these descendants are eligible for appointment to the Guardianship and are waiting for such a direct descendant of Baháʼu'lláh to arise as the rightful Guardian.

Enayatullah (Zabih) Yazdani was designated a Covenant-breaker in June 2005, after many years of insisting on his views that Mason Remey was the legitimate successor to Shoghi Effendi and of accepting Donald Harvey as the third guardian. He is now the fifth guardian of a small group of Baháʼís and resides in Australia.

There is also a small group in Montana, originally inspired by Leland Jensen, who claimed a status higher than that of the Guardian. His failed apocalyptic predictions and unsuccessful efforts to reestablish the Guardianship and the administration were apparent by his death in 1996. A dispute among Jensen's followers over the identity of the Guardian resulted in another division in 2001.

=== American opposition ===
Juan Cole, an American professor of Middle Eastern history who had been a Baháʼí for 25 years, left the religion in 1996 after being approached by a Continental Counselor about his involvement in a secret email list that was organizing opposition to certain Baháʼí institutions and policies. Cole was never labeled a Covenant-breaker, because he claimed to be a Unitarian-Universalist upon leaving. He went on to publish three papers in journals in 1998, 2000, and 2002. These heavily criticized the Baháʼí administration in the United States and suggested cult-like tendencies, particularly regarding the requirement of pre-publication review and the practice of shunning Covenant-breakers. For example, Cole wrote in 1998, "Baha’is, like members of The Watchtower and other cults, shun those who are excommunicated." In 2000, he wrote: "Baha'i authorities... keep believers in line by appealing to the welfare and unity of the community, and if these appeals fail then implicit or explicit threats of disfellowshipping and even shunning are invoked. ... Shunning is the central control mechanism in the Baha'i system" In 2002, he wrote: "Opportunistic sectarian-minded officials may have seen this... as a time when they could act arbitrarily and harshly against intellectuals and liberals, using summary expulsion and threats of shunning".

Moojan Momen, a Baháʼí author, reviewed 66 exit narratives of former Baháʼís, and identified 1996 (Cole's departure) to 2002 as a period of "articulate and well-educated" apostates that used the newly available Internet to connect with each other and form a community with its own "mythology, creed and salvation stories becoming what could perhaps be called an anti-religion". According to Momen, the narrative among these apostates of a "fiercely aggressive religion where petty dictators rule" is the opposite experience of most members, who see "peace as a central teaching", "consultative decision-making", and "mechanisms to guard against individuals attacking the central institutions of the Bahá'í Faith or creating schisms." On the practice of shunning, Momen writes that it is "rarely used and is only applied after prolonged negotiations fail to resolve the situation. To the best knowledge of the present author it has been used against no more than a handful of individuals in over two decades and to only the first of the apostates described below [Francesco Ficicchia] more than twenty-five years ago - although it is regularly mentioned in the literature produced by the apostates as though it were a frequent occurrence."

== See also ==
- Covenant of Baháʼu'lláh
- List of former Baháʼís
- List of excommunicated Baháʼís
