= Orthodox Baháʼí Faith =

Minority Bahá'í sect

The Orthodox Baháʼí Faith is an extremely small Baháʼí sect that was formed in 1960 by Mason Remey, and subsequently was the name used by one of his disputed successors, Joel Marangella. The sect is defined by a belief that the Guardianship of Shoghi Effendi (1921–1957) continued with further appointees, whereas the mainstream Baháʼís follow a line of leadership that transitioned to the elected Universal House of Justice in 1963 with no eligible appointees as Guardian.

Other than on the matter of leadership and organization, there are few differences between the Orthodox and mainstream Baháʼís regarding their doctrine. As a group who believe that Mason Remey was the second Guardian of the Baháʼí Faith, they are excommunicated by the majority of Baháʼís and labelled covenant-breakers. Those who supported Mason Remey feel in turn that the majority strayed from the original teachings.

Membership data of the Orthodox Baháʼís is scarce. They are mostly located in the United States, with few members and no communal religious life. One source estimated them at no more than 100 members as of 1988, with the largest concentration being 11 in Roswell, New Mexico. In an Illinois court case in 2007 they reported membership in the United States at 40, and a news agency reported them at "about 50" in 2010. Websites claiming to represent the Orthodox Baháʼís indicate followers in the United States and India.

== History ==
Following the unexpected death of the Baháʼí Faith's first Guardian Shoghi Effendi in 1957, the 27 living Hands of the Cause, gathered and decided that he had died "without having appointed his successor," and that the Universal House of Justice would decide on the situation after its first election. Charles Mason Remey, one of the Hands, declared himself the successor to Shoghi Effendi in 1960. Almost the whole Baháʼí world rejected his claim, which did not even address the requirements that Guardians be descendants of Baha'u'llah—making him ineligible—and that appointments must be clearly confirmed by the nine resident Hands of the Cause in Haifa. Initially the NSA of France and about 100 Baháʼís, mostly Americans, followed Remey. He was shunned as a covenant-breaker.

Initially, Remey had followers in Pakistan, India, the United States, and parts of Europe. He settled in Florence, Italy, until the end of his life. From there he appointed three local spiritual assemblies in Santa Fe, New Mexico, Rawalpindi, Pakistan, and Lucknow, India, then organized the election of two National Assemblies – in the United States and Pakistan.

In 1964 the Santa Fe assembly filed a lawsuit against the National Spiritual Assembly (NSA) of the Baháʼís of the United States to receive the legal title to the Baháʼí House of Worship in Illinois, and all other property owned by the NSA. The NSA counter-sued and won. The Santa Fe assembly lost the right to use the term "Baháʼí" in printed material. Remey then changed the name of his sect from "Baháʼís Under the Hereditary Guardianship" to "Abha World Faith" and also referred to it as the "Orthodox Faith of Baháʼu'lláh". In 1966, Remey asked the Santa Fe assembly to dissolve, as well as the second International Baháʼí Council that he had appointed with Joel Marangella, residing in France, as president.

Beginning in 1966–67, Remey was abandoned by almost all of his followers due to his criticism of Shoghi Effendi and other statements. The followers of Mason Remey were not organized until several of them began forming their own groups based on different understandings of succession, even before his death in 1974. The majority of them claimed that Remey was showing signs of senility.

The Encyclopædia Iranica reported the following in 1988:

Remey died in 1974, having appointed a third Guardian, but the number of adherents to the Orthodox faction remains extremely small. Although successful in Pakistan, the Remeyites seem to have attracted no followers in Iran. Other small groups have broken away from the main body from time to time, but none of these has attracted a sizeable following.

=== Joel Marangella ===
In 1961 Joel Marangella received a letter from Remey, and a note that, "...in or after 1963. You will know when to break the seal." In 1964 Remey appointed members to a second International Baháʼí Council with Marangella as president, significant due to Remey's claim to Guardianship being based on the same appointment. In 1965 Remey activated the council, and in 1966 wrote letters passing the "affairs of the Faith" to the council, then later dissolving it. In 1969 Marangella made an announcement that the letter of 1961 was Remey's appointment of him as the third Guardian, and that he had been the Guardian since 1964, invalidating Remey's pronouncements from that point forward.

In 1970 Marangella appointed members to a "National Bureau of the Orthodox Baháʼís in New York", which two years later was moved to New Mexico, and subsequently changed its name to "Mother Baháʼí Council of the United States" (1978) and "Provisional National Baháʼí Council" (2000), with all members appointed by Joel Marangella.

Marangella gained the support of most of Remey's followers, who came to be known as Orthodox Baháʼís. Joel Marangella died in San Diego, California on Sept 1, 2013. A website claiming to represent Orthodox Baháʼís indicates followers in the United States and India, and a fourth Guardian named Nosrat’u’llah Bahremand.

== Ruling on Baháʼí trademarks ==
In 2006, the mainstream Baháʼí administration filed a lawsuit accusing the Orthodox Baháʼís of violating the order issued in 1966. The Orthodox Baháʼís denied that they were the same group.

The federal 7th Circuit Court of Appeals ruled in 2008 that the 1966 decision against Mason Remey's use of Baha'i trademarks does not apply to any of the successor groups, such as, "Franklin D. Schlatter, Joel B. Marangella, the Provisional National Baha’i Council ("PNBC"), the Second International Baha’I Council (d/b/a Baha’is Under the Provisions of the Covenant) ("SIBC"), and the Baha’i Publishers Under the Provisions of the Covenant ("BPUPC")".

Deseret News reported in 2010:

Though the judges criticized the ruling from more than four decades ago as wrongfully trying to resolve an internal religious dispute, they determined it was a moot point since the 1966 defendants' denomination is now dissolved. Tuesday's ruling sidestepped questions about whether a religious organization can trademark its name or icons.

== Bibliography ==
- Marangella, Joel Bray; Orthodox Bahaʹi Faith of the United States and Canada (1977). What is the meaning of loyalty to the Covenant of Baháʼuʼlláh and who are the present-day covenant-breakers?. OCLC 852522886.
- Extracts from the Kitáb-i-aqdas: the Most Holy Book of the revelation of Baháʹuʹlláh. United States: National Bureau of the Orthodox Bahaʹi Faith of the United States and Canada. OCLC 2089855.
- Remey, Charles Mason (1960). Daily observations of the Baha'i faith: made to the Hands of the Faith in the Holy Land. Washington, D.C.: C.M. Remey. OCLC 233997461.
