= Ruth Berkeley White =

Ruth (Berkeley) White was an early American Baháʼí who became known for challenging the Will and Testament of ʻAbdu'l-Bahá, one of the founding documents behind the Baháʼí administration. She was designated a Covenant-breaker by ʻAbdu'l-Bahá's successor, Shoghi Effendi.

White met ʻAbdu'l-Bahá in 1912 in America, and again in 1920 when she went on pilgrimage to Haifa. When ʻAbdu'l-Bahá died in 1921, he left a will that designated Shoghi Effendi as the one that Baháʼís should turn to for guidance. It was this appointment that she opposed, and she went on to claim that the will was forged. Her claim was based in part on her belief that ʻAbdu'l-Bahá would never advocate for a hierarchy, much less the establishment of a "papacy".

During her time of opposition, White wrote several letters to the National Spiritual Assembly of the Baháʼís of the United States and Canada objecting to Shoghi Effendi and the idea of Spiritual Assemblies. She wrote a letter to the United States Postmaster General requesting that the National Spiritual Assembly not be allowed to use the mail system, and she also wrote to the High Commissioners for Palestine with complaints about Shoghi Effendi.

White hired a criminologist Charles Ainsworth Mitchell to review photocopies of the original Will and Testament of ʻAbdu'l-Bahá in an attempt to prove it was a forgery. Neither White nor Mitchell could read Persian, and her claims of a forgery were not taken up by many other Baháʼís opposed to Shoghi Effendi, such as Ahmad Sohrab.

White was designated a Covenant-breaker by Shoghi Effendi, and was excommunicated sometime after 1926 when the extent of her opposition became clear.

== Works ==
- White, Ruth (1929). Is the Bahai Organization the Enemy of the Bahai Religion?. New York City, USA: J.J. Little and Ives Company.
- ʻAbdu'l-Bahá's Alleged Will is Fraudulent, 1930.
- Correspondence Between the High Commissioner of Palestine and Ruth White, Concerning the Alleged Will and Testament of Sir ʻAbdul-Bahá ʻAbbas . 11. Los Angeles, Calif. : White, 1932.
- Baháʼí Leads out of the Labyrinth. New York: Universal Publishing Company, 132 E 65th Street, New York, 1944. Digitally republished, East Lansing, Mi.: H-Bahai, 2004.
- White, Ruth (1946). Abdul Baha's Questioned Will and Testament. Beverly Hills, California, USA: J.J. Little and Ives Company.

== See also ==
- Baháʼí divisions
- Hermann Zimmer
