= List of excommunicated Baháʼís =

Excommunicated Baháʼís are people who were followers of the Baháʼí Faith but were declared covenant-breakers by the head of the religion, currently the Universal House of Justice. These people may still self-identify as Baháʼís, but are no longer permitted to participate in official activities of the Bahá'í community, and Bahá'ís are discouraged from associating closely with them.

From 2000-2020, twenty individuals were expelled by the Baháʼí Administration for Covenant-breaking; one per year on average.

== List ==
=== Excommunicated by ʻAbdu'l-Bahá ===
- Mírzá Muhammad ʻAlí
- Ibrahim George Kheiralla

=== Excommunicated by Shoghi Effendi ===
- Ruth Berkeley White (1920s)
- Hermann Zimmer (1920s)
- Julia Lynch Olin (1939)
- Ahmad Sohrab (1953)

=== After Shoghi Effendi ===
- Mason Remey (1960)
- Leland Jensen (1960)

== See also ==
- List of Baháʼís
- List of converts to the Baháʼí Faith
- List of former Baháʼís
- Attempted schisms in the Baháʼí Faith
