= Caravan of East and West =

The Caravan of East and West is a tax-exempt, educational foundation for brotherhood, established in 1929 by Mirza Ahmad Sohrab, Lewis Stuyvesant Chanler and his wife Julie and located at 132 East 65th Street in New York City, at Caravan House, the former Chanler town residence.

The Caravan was a foundation that grew out of the New History Society. The foundation had a quarterly magazine called The Caravan in 1929, it is not clear how long this magazine lasted. They also had a quarterly magazine called The Children's Caravan in 1935, which "helps to keep children in touch with each other." (Educational Digest). They also apparently published some other works.

Originally a part of the Baháʼí Faith, that relationship ended shortly after the New York Spiritual Assembly was denied oversight by its founders. Sohrab refused and was excommunicated in 1939, which then led Julie to also refuse to appear to answer questions. The foundation severed ties, but continued to do work for the Baháʼí cause, without official sanction.

"At its height, just after World War II, the Caravan had grown to a membership of almost 250,000.... and its business soon overshadowed the New History Society." (Chapter 15) An article in The New York Times, states that in 1949 the German contingent alone had 100,000 members.

Two of the members of the board of directors were Syud Hossein, ambassador from India to Egypt and Minister to Trans-Jordan; and Basant Koomer a lecturer and educator.

A Foundation Fund directed by a board of directors with attorney Jacob Greenwald as Chairman was set up to continue the work of both the New Historical Society and the Caravan, planning for the day when Sohrab and Julie were no longer around.

In 1953, the Baháʼí materials the group had collected had grown so immense that Julie hired architect, John J. McNamara to design a library within the garden space of the Caravan House. Julia Chanler stated that "...as part of the construction [of the library] was a block of white marble that ʻAbdu'l-Bahá had sent to become the corner-stone of the Baháʼí Temple in Wilmette which Sohrab had come to possess." This stone was not forwarded to the temple site. The actual cornerstone used in the Temple was procured and donated by a Chicago-area Baháʼí, Ester "Nettie" Tobin.

The group's librarian was Vera Russell.

An advertisement for a special meeting of the corporation was placed in The New York Times November 21, 1958 naming Ronald K. Bayford as Executive Secretary. On October 29, 1961, an announcement of "Two horticultural lectures presented by the Caravan of East and West, an educational, nonprofit organization" appears in The New York Times. The Caravan of East and West still existed as late as 1967 when Peter Bloch was director. (Peter Bloch was later president of the Association for Puerto Rican-Hispanic Culture, Inc. The New York Times, June 26, 1972.)

Sohrab died in 1958 and Chanler a few years later. The New History Society is now defunct, apparently not outliving Sohrab. Caravan House still exists at the same address as when founded, "Caravan Institute, Inc. is a non-profit organization founded in 1929 to further education and the arts." They have about a million a year in income () and are currently actively operating an adult-education Italian language school with no connection to the Baháʼí Faith. ()

== Works ==
- Sohrab, Mirza Ahmad. A Persian Rosary of Nineteen Pearls. 2nd. ed. New York, Caravan of East & West, n.d. [194-?] 3rd. ed. New York, Caravan of East & West, n.d. [195-?] ed., [4]. New York: New History Society, n.d. [1939].
- Bahai Cause, Founded by Baha-o-llah, Is a Call to Spiritually Mature Men and Women, The. 4. New York: Caravan of the East and West, n.d. [194-?].
- One Hundred Years, 1844-1944. 24 leaves. New York: Caravan of East and West, 1944. Collins 12.13 (Also a version with 46 pages).
- The Plan of the Caravan for the Republic of Mankind. [4]. New York: Caravan of East and West, n.d. [195-?].
- Opening of Bahai Library. [2] leaves. New York: Caravan of East & West, 1953.
- A Code of Civilization. Resolutions presented by Mirza Ahmad Sohrab and passed unanimously by the members of the Caravan on Saturday afternoon, April 10, 1954. New York: Caravan of East and West, 1954.
- Ioas, Leroy, Mrs Lewis Stuyvesant [Julie Chanler] Chanler, and Ahmad Sohrab. Three Letters. [11] leaves. New York: Caravan of East and West, 1954.
- Call to a World Conference in Jerusalem, 1957. 4. New York: The Caravan of East and West, n.d. [1955?].
