= Fazl'ollah Mohtadi Sobhi =

Iranian author, storyteller, and teacher (1897–1962)

- Fazl'ollah Mohtadi Sobhi
- Born: 1897; Kashan, Qajar Iran
- Died: November 8, 1962; Tehran, Iran
- Resting place: Zahir-od-dowleh cemetery, Tehran
- Occupations: Author, storyteller, teacher
- Known for: Children's folklore; Radio Tehran storytelling

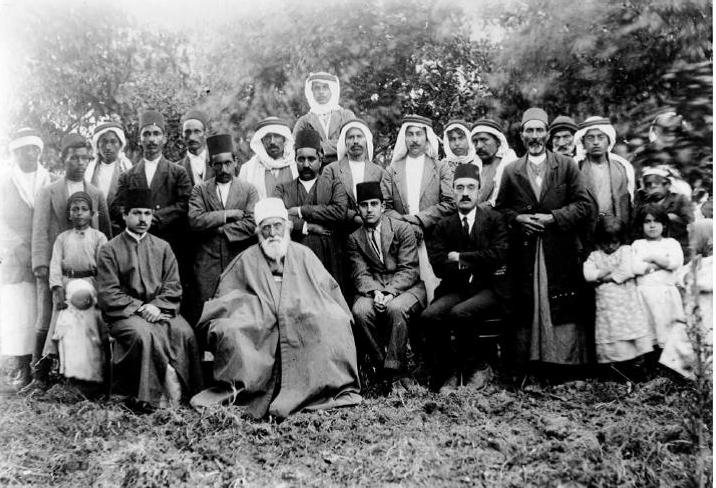
Front row (L to R) : Sobhi, 'Abdu'l Baha's Secretary, 'Abdu'l Baha, Jalal Azal and Aziz'u'llah Bahadur

Fazl'ollah Mohtadi Sobhi (Persian: فضل‌الله مهتدی صبحی; 1897 – 8 November 1962), commonly known as Sobhi, was an Iranian author, storyteller, and teacher. He is widely regarded as one of the most important collectors and researchers of Iranian folk tales for children, and is credited with establishing the tradition of radio storytelling for children in Iran. He gained enormous popularity through his long-running program on Radio Tehran, which he hosted for twenty-two years.

== Early life ==
Fazl'ollah Mohtadi Sobhi was born in 1897 in Kashan into a Baháʼí family. His father, Mohammad Hossein Mohtadi, was a merchant who had relocated to Tehran. His paternal grandfather was Haj Mulla Ali Akbar, a Muslim scholar from Kashan.

His parents divorced when he was six years old. He and his sister subsequently lived with their father and stepmother, while visiting their mother on Friday evenings. Sobhi later recalled those visits warmly, writing that his mother would tell him and his sister fairy tales — an early and lasting influence on his lifelong passion for storytelling. His mother died when he was eleven years old.

His first teacher was a woman named Aghabaygum, who taught him to read. He subsequently attended the Tarbiyat School in Tehran for his primary education, where he also participated in literary and religious study circles. Due to ongoing difficulties at home with his stepmother, his father eventually sent him to Qazvin, after which he embarked on an extended journey through Azerbaijan, Georgia, Uzbekistan, and Turkmenistan, spending time in cities including Ashgabat, Bukhara, Samarkand, Tashkent, and Merv.

== Involvement with the Baháʼí Faith ==
Sobhi's family had deep roots in the Baháʼí movement: his paternal grandmother, Ḥājiya ʿAmma Ḵānom, was a Bābi convert from the religion's earliest period and a paternal aunt of Baháʼu'lláh's wife. When her pilgrimage to the Baháʼí centre in ʿAkkā became public knowledge, she was compelled to leave Kashan, and the broader family followed her to Tehran. There, Sobhi was enrolled at the Baháʼí Tarbiyat School. Around 1916–17, he joined Mirzā Mahdi Aḵawān Ṣafā on a preaching tour across Azerbaijan, the Caucasus, and Central Asia, staying on for a period in Ashgabat before heading back to Tehran in 1918. The following year he set out for Haifa to meet ʻAbdu'l-Bahá, who invited him to stay on as one of several secretarial aides. Baháʼí accounts of this period portray the young Sobhi as headstrong and difficult; they record, for instance, that he quarrelled with and insulted Ibn Aṣdaq, a respected senior figure in the community, during the voyage to Haifa. He remained in that secretarial role for roughly two years, working alongside other scribes and assistants, until his behaviour brought about the termination of his appointment; he returned to Iran not long before ʻAbdu'l-Bahá's death in 1921. Back in Iran, Sobhi grew increasingly hostile to the authority of Shoghi Effendi and voiced this opposition within the Iranian Baháʼí community. His public dissent, combined with his close ties to ʿAbd-al-Ḥosayn Āyati — a prominent figure who had renounced the faith — prompted official warnings from the Baháʼí elected council, culminating in his formal expulsion in the spring of 1928. Over the next few years he made several attempts to be reinstated. He went on to publish two books rooted in his experiences, Ketāb-e Ṣobḥi (1933) and Payām-e Pedar (1956).

== Career ==
=== Teaching ===
After returning to Tehran in 1918 at his father's urging, Sobhi began a career as a teacher at the Tarbiyat School. Following the end of World War I, he traveled to the Holy Land and spent two years as secretary to ʻAbdu'l-Bahá in Haifa (see above). After returning to Tehran and his excommunication in 1928, he secured teaching positions at the Sadat School of Sayyid Yahya Dawlatabadi and later at the American High School in Tehran. He also briefly taught at the Law College (Dāneškade-ye ḥoquq) during 1937–38.

In 1933, Sobhi joined the Higher Academy of Music (Honarestān-e ʿāli-e musiqi) in Tehran, where he taught Persian language and literature. He also published his first autobiographical work, Kitab-i Sobhi, that same year, which helped to reduce the professional ostracism he had been experiencing.

=== Radio career ===
When radio broadcasting was introduced in Iran, the music and children's programming was entrusted to the Higher Academy of Music, and the children's section was placed immediately in Sobhi's hands. In April 1940 — within a month of the founding of Radio Iran — he joined Radio Tehran as a storyteller and launched his celebrated Friday Noon Story program (Qesse-ye Zohr-e Jom'e).

Sobhi actively collected stories by inviting young listeners to send him tales they had heard from older family members. He gathered these stories from across Iran, selected the finest version of each, and retold them in simple, flowing language. He had a vast knowledge of stories from diverse cultures and specialised in comparing Iranian folk tales with counterpart traditions from Tajikistan, Afghanistan, India, Russia, Georgia, Azerbaijan, and Denmark. Sobhi also had working knowledge of English and Arabic.

His program became enormously popular, especially among children. The radio storytelling tradition he established brought the ancient Persian art of oral narrative (naqqali) from coffeehouses and public squares into Iranian homes. He continued his radio program for twenty-two years and is regarded as one of the most beloved radio personalities in Iran. After his death, recordings of his stories were rebroadcast for approximately a further decade.

== Personal life ==
Sobhi never married and lived a simple, solitary life. He died of laryngeal cancer on 17 Aban 1341 (8 November 1962) in Tehran. He was buried at the Zahir-od-dowleh cemetery in Tehran. His tombstone bears the opening verse of Rumi's Masnavi — the very line he recited at the opening of every radio program — along with the inscription: "Eternal resting place of the late Fazl'ollah Mohtadi Sobhi, the renowned storyteller, whose life's tale ended at the dawn of an autumn day."

== Works ==
Sobhi's published output falls into two broad categories: autobiographical writings and collections of folk tales and children's literature.

=== Autobiographies ===
- Kitab-i Sobhi (The Book of Sobhi, 1933): His first autobiographical work, recounting his life and experiences.
- Payam-i Pidar (The Father's Message, 1956): A continuation and expansion of the first book, written in response to the many questions it generated among readers.

=== Folk tales and children's literature ===
- Afsaneha (Fairy Tales, 1946): A two-volume collection of Persian stories and fairy tales.
- Afsanehay-i Bastani Iran wa Majar (Ancient Iranian and Hungarian Fairy Tales, 1943): A collection of nineteen stories.
- Afsanehay-i Kuhan (Ancient Fairy Tales, 1949): A collection of stories drawn from classical Persian tradition.
- Dastanha-i Melal (Stories of the Nations, 1948): A collection of stories from Iran, Russia, Georgia, Azerbaijan, and Denmark.
- Amoo Nawrooz (Uncle Nawrooz): A collection of twenty-six short stories. The title story narrates the legend of Uncle Nawrooz (Amoo Nowruz), the folkloric symbol of spring and the Persian New Year.
- Deje Hoosh Roba (The Mind-Stealing Castle): The story of three men who embark on a quest to win the hand of a Chinese princess in marriage. The work is based on a poem of the same name by Rumi.
- Hajj Mirza Zulfali (1947).
- Dastanhay-i Divan-i Balkh (Stories from the Courthouse of Balkh): The story of a corrupt judge who attempts to coerce a woman who rejects his advances.

Several of Sobhi's works have been translated into German, Czech, and Russian.

== Bibliography ==
- Encyclopædia Iranica (2012). "ṢOBḤI, FAŻL-ALLĀH MOHTADI". Encyclopædia Iranica.
- Hunt, Peter (2004). International Companion Encyclopedia of Children's Literature. Vol. 1. Abingdon: Routledge. p. 1095. ISBN 0-415-29054-6.
- Mohtadi (Sobhi), Fazlollah (1956). Payam-i Pedar (PDF). Tehran.
- Momen, Moojan (2020). "Sobhi, Fazlollah Mohtadi". bahai-library.com.
- Vejdani, Farzin (2012). "Appropriating the Masses: Folklore Studies, Ethnography, and Interwar Iranian Nationalism". International Journal of Middle East Studies. 44 (3): 516. doi:10.1017/S002074381200044X. S2CID 162483200.
- Nadjmabadi, Shahnaz R. (2012). Conceptualizing Iranian Anthropology: Past and Present Perspectives. New York: Berghahn Books. p. 32. ISBN 978-0-85745-651-9. OCLC 839309062.
- "فضل‌الله مهتدی صبحی". Persian Wikipedia (in Persian). 2024.
- "فضل‌الله مهتدی صبحی". Tavaana (in Persian). 2020.
- "فضل‌الله مهتدی صبحی". Ketabak (in Persian). 2014.
- "فضل الله مهتدی مشهور به صبحی". Yar Mehraban (in Persian). 2022.
- "دژ هوش‌ربا". Iranak Children's Museum.
- "داستان‌های دیوان بلخ". Iranak Children's Museum.
- "افسانه‌های باستان ایران و مجار". Iranak Children's Museum.
