= C. Ainsworth Mitchell =

British chemist and forensic scientist

- Born: 20 November 1867
- Died: 5 January 1948 (aged 80)

Charles Ainsworth Mitchell FRIC FCS (20 November 1867 – 5 January 1948) was a British chemist and forensic scientist who made a special study of the microscopic and chemical study of handwriting. He was a Fellow of the Royal Institute of Chemistry and the Chemical Society, and member of the Society of Public Analysts He was editor of The Analyst for 25 years, president of the Medico-Legal Society (1935–1937), and vice president of the Society of Chemistry (1937–1940).

== Life ==
Mitchell was born 20 November 1867 in Thetford, England, the third son of Dr. T. H. Mitchell. He was educated at King William's College, and Exeter College, Oxford, graduating in 1889. In 1899 he married Edith Boyle Keely.

== Career ==
=== Chemist ===
As a chemist and a scientist, Mitchell's work covered a wide range of topics. He became a fellow of the Royal Institute of Chemistry in 1897 and of the Chemical Society in 1916. In 1907 he advocated using a pinhole camera to photograph the sun in an article in Knowledge and Scientific News, a method which he notes was known as early as 1615 but seemed to have been forgotten. In 1911, he advocated the switch from lead to copper pipes for drinking water. His reasoning was that copper would better be able to alert the drinker to an excess of poisonous sulphates in the water. In 1920, he became editor of The Analyst, a journal of the Chemical Society, and under 25 years of his editorship the journal expanded in scope and increased in reputation.

=== Criminologist ===
In 1911 he was head of the inspection bureau of Scotland Yard. He frequently served as an expert witness. In 1915, he gave testimony about the invisible ink used in the case of German spy, Anton Kuepferle.

In 1925 he analyzed documents and seals of Mary, Queen of Scots and claimed to show that Mary was innocent of conspiracy to assassinate Queen Elizabeth I of England. He said that William Maitland, Mary's secretary, forged Mary's hand in the documents which led to Mary's execution. In 1929, he was an advocate of the use of fingerprints to determine identity, a method which he traced to Sir William Herschell in 1853, who saw the method used to document an individual's identity in India, where he was a commissioner. He showed that monkeys may be identified by fingerprints and that the same could be done with the markings on a cow's nose.

He was hired by Ruth White to analyze the Will and Testament of `Abdu'l-Bahá. White opposed parts of the will that suggested the establishment of a hierarchy in the Baháʼí Faith. His report concluded in agreement with White, that the document was a forgery. White placed Mitchell's signed report on the writing shown on the photographs of the document with the U.S. Library of Congress in 1930.

== Bibliography ==
Mitchell's works include:

- Inks: their composition and manufacture (1904)
- Science and the Criminal (1911).
- Edible Oils & Fats (1918)
