= Ahmad Sohrab =

Persian-American author

Mírzá Aḥmad Sohráb (March 21, 1890 – April 20, 1958) was a Persian-American author and Baháʼí who served as 'Abdu'l-Bahá's secretary and interpreter from 1912 to 1919. He co-founded the New History Society and the Caravan of East and West in New York and was excommunicated from the Baháʼí Faith in 1939 by Shoghi Effendi.

== Biography ==
=== Early life ===
Born a Baháʼí in Sedeh, Isfahan Province, Persia (now Iran), Sohrab's father 'Abdu'l-Baghi was a descendant of Muhammad. 'Abdu'l-Baghi was the chief dyer of the town. Both sides of Sohrab's family, his mother and his father, claimed descent from Imam Husayn, grandson of Muhammad. His mother died when Sohrab was a few months old, while she herself was still a teenager, and he was taken to live with his maternal grandmother in Isfahan.

=== New History Society ===
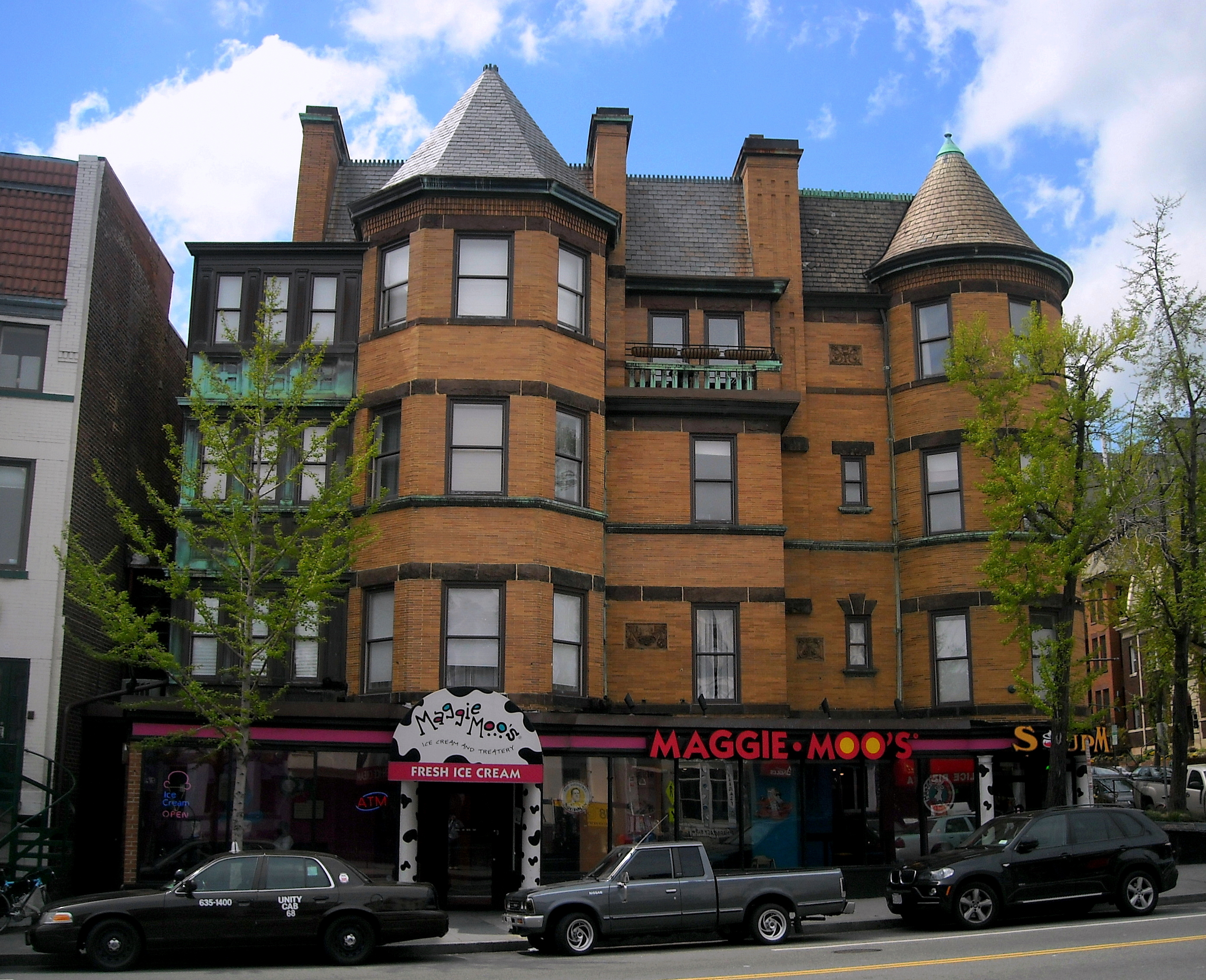
Former residence of Ahmad Sohrab in Washington, D.C.

By 1911, he had founded an organization called the Persian-American Educational Society. Later that year he sailed to Europe "in the interests of his work". Sohrab was secretary and interpreter to 'Abdu'l-Bahá from 1912 to 1919. He emigrated to the United States in 1919, sailing as a first class passenger from Port Said, Egypt to New York, on board the S/S Yeboshi Maru. In the 1920s, while living in Los Angeles, he helped write a scenario for a movie dealing with Mary Magdalene, for the actress Valeska Surratt. In 1927 Cecil B. Demille released The King of Kings which the duo claimed he had stolen from their scenario. Suratt sued Cecil B. Demille and others in 1928, and mentioned that Sohrab had helped her write the play. The case went to trial in 1930 and was quietly settled out of court.

He found it necessary to go to New York to discuss business matters with Miss Surratt and it was through her that he was introduced to Lewis Stuyvesant Chanler and his wife Julie. Together they formed the "New History Society" in 1929 as an indirect way of spreading the teachings of the Baháʼí Faith.

On Mar 10, 1930, "Mirza Ahmad Sohrab" filed a petition for naturalization in the US District Court of New York City. The petition states that he is 39 years old and residing at 28 W 50th Street.

=== Caravan of East and West ===
The New History Society gave rise in 1930 to the Caravan of East and West, and the Chanler's New York house was now called Caravan House. This foundation was designed to prepare children and youth to join the New History Society. This group had a quarterly magazine called The Caravan, where Sohrab's partial autobiography first appeared. (The autobiography appeared again in 1959, shortly after his death, with a few additional paragraphs which add little.)

"The Caravan of East and West is an educational movement, the chief activity of which is international correspondence. It numbers 1,300 Chapters in 37 countries, with an aggregate membership of 100,000 children, young people and adults. Its publications, The Caravan and Pen Friends Guide, respectively appearing quarterly and monthly, keep the large circle of its readers informed as to the growth and influence of the movement. The New History Society and the Caravan is a movement in itself for the spreading of the Baháʼí ideals and principles, independent of and unaffiliated with the Baháʼí organization."

Sohrab had already published a few books, pamphlets and a movie scenario, when in 1933, with Julie Chanler he wrote a book that provided an overview of many of the events of the Baháʼí movement; it contained a description of the events of the Báb, Baháʼu'lláh — his claim in the Garden of Ridván – Táhirih, and 'Abdu'l-Bahá. The book also contains several pictures, including some which may be unique.

=== The Split ===
Mrs. Chanler attempted to patch things up between Sohrab and Horace Holley, "one of the chief men in the American Baháʼí Administration". But Sohrab refused to allow the New York Spiritual Assembly to have oversight of the affairs of the New History Society. Since Holley sat on the National Spiritual Assembly at this time, this led to a confrontation which resulted in Sohrab and the Chanlers being expelled from the Baháʼí community about 1939.

=== Marriage ===
It was while accompanying ʻAbdu'l-Bahá in 1912, that Ahmad briefly met and began wooing Juanita Marie Storch, when she was brought by her father to meetings with ʻAbdu'l-Bahá in Oakland and San Francisco in 1912. The Storch family, at that time was living in Oakland, Alameda County, California.

Sohrab returned to Palestine, but the wooing took place long-distance by means of "five hundred letters". The coming of World War I, put a temporary halt to the letters as they were apparently being confiscated or at least not allowed through the lines, but at the end of the war, the lovers re-made their acquaintance (see The Oakland Tribune, 26 December 1919).

Sohrab's wife and daughter remained faithful to Shoghi Effendi and changed their names.

=== Lawsuit ===
In 1941, Allen McDaniel and others, as members of the National Spiritual Assembly, filed suit against Sohrab to try to stop him from using the name Baháʼí. The NSA felt this created the impression that Sohrab was "connected with and authorized to represent the Baháʼí religion..."

This suit was filed in the Supreme Court of New York County. The judge granted a motion to dismiss, stating that "the plaintiffs have no right to a monopoly of the name of a religion. The defendants, who purport to be members of the same religion, have an equal right to use the name of the religion..."

The judge mentioned that the complaint could be further amended and the NSA appealed but the Appellate Court affirmed the decision of the lower court.

=== Collaboration with other opponents of Shoghi Effendi ===
After his excommunication, Sohrab joined forces with other people who opposed Shoghi Effendi. Part of this combination was a court case raised by Qamar Baháʼí, Jalal the grandson of Mírzá Músá and others in about 1950–1, challenging Shoghi Effendi's right to carry out major construction work around the Shrine of Baháʼu'lláh. One of their key witnesses, Nayyir Afnan, died shortly before the case was due to open, and it all came to nothing. One of the culminations of this was a meeting that was held in Famagusta in the late 1950s. Representatives of all three main generations of what Baha'is call "Covenant-breakers" were present including: Jalal Azal representing the followers of Mirza Yahya, 'Ismat and others represented the followers of Mírzá Muhammad 'Alí, and Ahmad Sohrab represented those opposed to any form of administration. One of the aims of this conference was to build a mausoleum over the grave of Mírzá Yahyá. To this end, an amount of money was collected but it "disappeared" and nothing came of the project.

Moojan Momen notes that:

"In theory, the second generation, who accepted Baháʼu'lláh, should have had nothing to do with the first generation followers of Azal, the enemy of Baháʼu'lláh. Similarly, the third generation, accounting themselves loyal followers of 'Abdu'l-Bahá, should have had nothing to do with the second generation who were vehement opponents of 'Abdu'l-Bahá; even less should they support the first generation. But in fact strong links formed between these generations."

=== Final years ===
Caravan eventually severed the links with the Baháʼí Faith, but Sohrab, Mrs. Chanler, and their organizations continued claim association with the Baháʼí Faith as long as they both were living.

The Caravan existed for a time as a worldwide pen-pal club with social ideals. In addition, there are various references to the Caravan Art Gallery at this same address. There are also references in Mrs. Chanler's and Sohrab's writings to art showings.

Sohrab died April 20, 1958. In his obituary he is described as "leader of the Reform Baháʼí Movement in the United States and co-director of the Caravan of East and West".

The New History Society is now defunct, not outliving Sohrab, however the Caravan of East and West persisted and currently operates at the same address as Caravan Institute, an adult-education Italian language school with no connection to the Baháʼí Faith.

== Works ==
- The Diary of Ahmad Sohrab: Diary Letters and Notes (1912-1915).
- 'Abdu'l-Bahá in Egypt. New York: J. H. Sears & Co for the New history Foundation, 1929. Approved by the Publishing Committee of the National Spiritual Assembly of the Baháʼís of the United States and Canada.
- Heart Phantasies, 1924.
- The New Humanity, appeared daily for some time in a Santiago newspaper, (sometime before 1929), date uncertain.
- The Song of the Caravan. Another ed. also 1930, New York, The Grayzel Press ed., xii, 410. New York: George Dobsevage for the New History Foundation, 1930.
- Living Pictures. In the Great Drama of the 19th Century. (with Julie Chanler) New York: The New History Foundation, 132 E 65th St, New York, 1933. Reprinted. H-Bahai: Lansing, Michigan, 2004.
- I Heard Him Say. Words of 'Abdu'l-Bahá as Recorded by his Secretary. New York: The New History Foundation, 1937. Digitally republished, East Lansing, Mi.: H-Bahai, 2004
- The Bible of Mankind, (ed.) 743 pp., Universal Publishing Co., 132 E 65th St, N.Y., 1939.
- A Persian Rosary of Nineteen Pearls. 2nd. ed. New York, Caravan of East & West, n.d. [194-?] 3rd. ed. New York, Caravan of East & West, n.d. [195-?] ed., [4]. New York: New History Society, n.d. [1939].
- 'Abdu'l-Bahá's Grandson: Story of a Twentieth Century Excommunication. New York: Universal Publishing Co for The New History Foundation, 1943. Reprinted. H-Bahai: Lansing, Michigan, 2004.
- Brand, Max and Mirza Ahmad Sohrab [libretto Max Brand, and Julie Chanler; Music Max Brand]. The Gate: Scenic Oratorio for Soli, Chorus, and Orchestra in Two Parts (19 Scenes). 61. New York: Associated Music Publishers, 1944.
- The Will and Testament of 'Abdu'l-Bahá, An Analysis. New York: Universal Publishing Co, 1944. Reprinted. H-Bahai: Lansing, Michigan, 2004.
- The Story of the Divine Plan. Taking Place during, and immediately following World War I. New York: The New History Foundation, 1947. Digitally republished, East Lansing, Mi.: H-Bahai, 2004.
- Ioas, Leroy, Mrs Lewis Stuyvesant [Julie Chanler] Chanler, and Ahmad Sohrab. Three Letters. [11] leaves. New York: Caravan of East and West, 1954.
- Living Schools of Religion. Vergilius Ferm, ed. Ames, Iowa: Littlefield, Adams & Co., 1956. Chapter 19, "The Baháʼí Cause," by Mirza Ahmad Sohrab (pages 309–14)
- My Baháʼí Pilgrimage. Autobiography from Childhood to Middle Age. New York: New History Foundation, 1959. Reprinted. H-Bahai: Lansing, Michigan, 2004.

== Works about him ==
- Biographical Sketch of Mirza Ahmad Sohrab, Director of the Caravan of East and West, Inc. 3. n.p. [New York?]: n.d. [1954]. Collins 12.10.
- Light-Bearer Magazine: A Persian Rosary, Winter 2000, pg 50 (reprint from The Theosophist, 1978)

== See also ==
- Baháʼí divisions
- List of excommunicated Baháʼís
