= Will and Testament of ʻAbdu'l-Bahá =

Central Bahá'í text

The Will and Testament of ʻAbdu'l-Bahá was a seminal document of the Baháʼí Faith, written in three stages by ʻAbdu'l-Bahá. Several sections were written under imminent threat of harm. The first section was probably written in 1906.

This document constitutes one of the central and defining pieces of Baháʼí primary source literature, and is considered to be intimately connected to Baháʼu'lláh's (ʻAbdu'l-Bahá's father) Most Holy Book.

The Will and Testament, along with the Tablets of the Divine Plan and the Tablet of Carmel, were described by Shoghi Effendi as the charters of the Baháʼí administration.

== Overview of the Will and Testament ==
The Covenant is a critical aspect of the Baháʼí Faith. The Will and Testament of ʻAbdu'l-Bahá is sometimes seen as the culmination of ʻAbdu'l-Bahá's role as the "Centre of the Covenant". In it he describes his circumstances, lays out his testimony, refers to the machinations of certain enemies, settles certain affairs of the Baháʼí Faith, and appoints his grandson Shoghi Effendi as his successor and the Guardian of the Cause of God. He also refines the structure of Baha'i administration by the aforementioned appointment, the establishment of the Spiritual Assembly at the national level, and defines the mechanism for the election of these assemblies as well as the House of Justice.

The Will is written in three sections, each of which were written separately and under differing circumstances. The three sections, however, remain together and comprise, collectively, the full Will and Testament.

== Key provisions of the Will ==
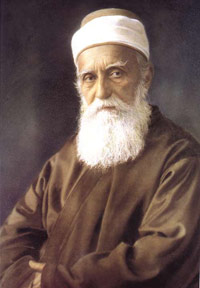
ʻAbdu'l-Bahá ʻAbbas

=== Baháʼí Fundamentals ===
ʻAbdu'l-Bahá notes the fundamental teachings of the Baháʼí Faith as love for all mankind. He then reiterates the twofold station of the Báb as a Manifestation of God and the forerunner to Baháʼu'lláh, and explains the full station of Baháʼu'lláh.

- "O ye beloved of the Lord! In this sacred Dispensation, conflict and contention are in no wise permitted. Every aggressor deprives himself of God's grace. It is incumbent upon everyone to show the utmost love, rectitude of conduct, straightforwardness and sincere kindliness unto all the peoples and kindreds of the world, be they friends or strangers. So intense must be the spirit of love and loving kindness, that the stranger may find himself a friend, the enemy a true brother, no difference whatsoever existing between them." (part 1, paragraph 24)
- "His Holiness, the Exalted One (the Báb), is the Manifestation of the Unity and Oneness of God and the Forerunner of the Ancient Beauty." (part 2, paragraph 8)
- "His Holiness the Abhá Beauty [Baháʼu'lláh] (may my life be a sacrifice for His steadfast friends) is the Supreme Manifestation of God and the Dayspring of His Most Divine Essence. All others are servants unto Him and do His bidding." (part 2, paragraph 8)

=== The Covenant ===
ʻAbdu'l-Bahá writes about the virtues of the Covenant established by Baháʼu'lláh, and writes about its power. He then goes on to account the sufferings that the centre of the Baháʼí Faith has suffered by people who were not faithful to the Covenant including Mírzá Yahyá with respect to Baháʼu'lláh, and Mírzá Muhammad ʻAlí with respect to himself.

- "O ye that stand fast and firm in the Covenant! The Center of Sedition, the Prime Mover of mischief, Mírzá Muhammad ʻAlí, hath passed out from under the shadow of the Cause, hath broken the Covenant, hath falsified the Holy Text, hath inflicted a grievous loss upon the true Faith of God, hath scattered His people, hath with bitter rancor endeavored to hurt ʻAbdu'l-Bahá and hath assailed with the utmost enmity this servant of the Sacred Threshold." (part 1, paragraph 6)

=== The Guardianship and the Universal House of Justice ===
ʻAbdu'l-Bahá establishes the institution of the Guardianship as a hereditary office and outlines its essential function as Interpreter of the Baháʼí writings. He states that the Guardian has the right to appoint Hands of the Cause and outlines their inter-relationship. He then explains the election of the Universal House of Justice and re-iterates that only it has the authority to enact laws that are not specifically explained in the Baháʼí holy books.

The sacred and youthful branch, the Guardian of the Cause of God, as well as the Universal House of Justice, to be universally elected and established, are both under the care and protection of the Abhá Beauty, under the shelter and unerring guidance of the Exalted One (may my life be offered up for them both). Whatsoever they decide is of God... The mighty stronghold shall remain impregnable and safe through obedience to him who is the Guardian of the Cause of God.

— Part 1, para. 18

By this House is meant the Universal House of Justice, that is, in all countries a secondary House of Justice must be instituted, and these secondary Houses of Justice must elect the members of the Universal one. Unto this body all things must be referred. It enacteth all ordinances and regulations that are not to be found in the explicit Holy Text. By this body all the difficult problems are to be resolved and the Guardian of the Cause of God is its sacred head and the distinguished member for life of that body.

— Part 1, para. 26

=== Hands of the Cause of God ===
The Will and Testament also defines the obligation and responsibilities of the Hands of the Cause of God. Their main responsibilities include teaching the Baháʼí Faith, and also included to cast out the rebellious, to elect nine from within themselves who would assist the Guardian and who would confirm the choice of the Guardian's successor.

- "My object is to show that the Hands of the Cause of God must be ever watchful and so soon as they find anyone beginning to oppose and protest against the Guardian of the Cause of God, cast him out from the congregation of the people of Bahá and in no wise accept any excuse from him." (part 1, paragraph 18)
- "The Hands of the Cause of God must elect from their own number nine persons that shall at all times be occupied in the important services in the work of the Guardian of the Cause of God. The election of these nine must be carried either unanimously or by majority from the company of the Hands of the Cause of God and these, whether unanimously or by a majority vote, must give their assent to the choice of the one whom the Guardian of the Cause of God hath chosen as his successor." (part 1, paragraph 20)
- "The Hands of the Cause of God must be nominated and appointed by the Guardian of the Cause of God. All must be under his shadow and obey his command. Should any, within or without the company of the Hands of the Cause of God disobey and seek division, the wrath of God and His vengeance will be upon him, for he will have caused a breach in the true Faith of God." (part 1, paragraph 21)
- "This body of the Hands of the Cause of God is under the direction of the Guardian of the Cause of God. He must continually urge them to strive and endeavor to the utmost of their ability to diffuse the sweet savors of God, and to guide all the peoples of the world, for it is the light of Divine Guidance that causeth all the universe to be illumined." (part 1, paragraph 23)

== Challenges to the Will ==
The provisions of ʻAbdu'l-Bahá's Will were almost universally accepted by Baháʼís, except for a few western Baháʼís, including Hermann Zimmer and Ruth White, who believed that ʻAbdu'l-Bahá would never have established a hierarchy in the Baháʼí Faith. Ruth White led a campaign challenging the will for several years, mostly 1926–1929, hiring criminologist Charles Mitchell to analyze the Will. His preliminary report concluded that based on handwriting analysis, that the Will was not written by ʻAbdu'l-Bahá. Baháʼí sources claim that this charge was denied by those who read Persian and were familiar with ʻAbdu'l-Bahá's writings, including some of Shoghi Effendi's opponents.
