= Baháʼí administration =

Administrative system of the Baháʼí Faith

The Baháʼí administration is a system of elected and appointed institutions to govern the affairs of the Baháʼí community. Its supreme body is the Universal House of Justice, elected every five years.

Some features set apart the Baháʼí administration from similar systems of governance: elected representatives should follow their conscience, rather than being responsible to the views of electors; political campaigning, nominations and parties are prohibited; and structure and authority of institutions to lead Baháʼís flowed directly from the religion's founder, Baháʼu'lláh.

The Baháʼí administration has four charter documents, the Kitáb-i-Aqdas, the Tablets of the Divine Plan, the Tablet of Carmel and the Will and Testament of ʻAbdu'l-Bahá.

== Character ==
=== Consultation ===
A central and distinct aspect of the administration of the Baháʼí Faith is the approach to decision-making through consultation. The ultimate aim of consultation is the collective search for truth and investigation of reality in a manner that maintains unity and concord. ʻAbdu'l-Bahá encouraged elected members to "take counsel together in such wise that no occasion for ill-feeling or discord may arise." Baháʼís are encouraged to express their views in consultation frankly and calmly, remaining detached from their own opinions and listening to the viewpoints of others without taking offence. After thorough consultation on a topic, if a decision is not unanimous, the decision can be made by a majority vote.

=== Structure ===
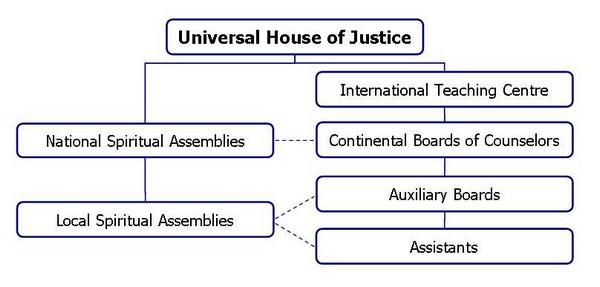
A diagram of the present Baháʼí administrative order

The Baháʼí administration includes both elected and appointed institutions. Governing bodies consisting of nine members are elected annually at both local and national levels, and every five years members of all National Spiritual Assemblies gather to elect the Universal House of Justice, an international governing body which possesses the authority to supplement and apply the laws of Baháʼu'lláh. Appointed institutions in the Baháʼí administrative order include the International Teaching Centre, Continental Boards of Counsellors, and Auxiliary Board members.

As there is no clergy in the Baháʼí Faith, the Baháʼí administration operates through a type of non-partisan democratic self-government. The individuals elected to serve on institutions in the Baháʼí community have no authority as individuals, it is only the elected body itself that makes decisions. Likewise, individuals who are appointed to serve in an institutional capacity also "have no legislative, executive, or judicial authority", and instead they provide advice, encouragement, and support to individuals in the community and to elected institutions.

The individual, the community, and the institutions are each viewed as protagonists that have different roles but that support one another to progress along a continuum of development.

=== Method of election ===
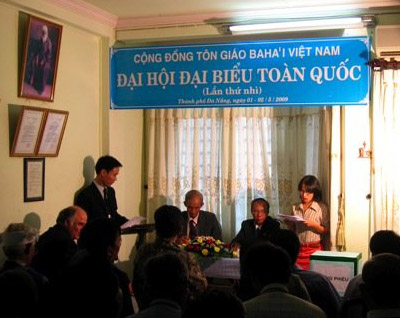
Vietnamese Baháʼís elect their National Spiritual Assembly in Danang, in 2009.

Local Spiritual Assemblies are elected each year on the first day of Ridván (usually 20th or 21st April). The nine members of the Local Spiritual Assembly are elected by secret ballot with no campaigning or nomination process. In general, all registered adult Baháʼís in the community are eligible to take part in the election and also are eligible to be voted for. Each individual writes on their ballot paper the names of nine individuals in the community whom they feel best demonstrate the "necessary qualities of unquestioned loyalty, of selfless devotion, of a well-trained mind, of recognized ability and mature experience." In order to determine who to vote for, Baháʼís are encouraged to become thoroughly acquainted with one another, to exchange views, and to freely discuss the requirements and qualifications for service on institutions; however, this should be done without even the slightest reference to specific individuals.

At the national level, a two-stage electoral process is used. In each electoral unit within a country, the members of the community elect annually a specified number of delegates, which are assigned proportionally to the population of each unit, and these delegates then gather at a National Convention to elect the members of the National Spiritual Assembly. Similarly, every five years the members of each National Spiritual Assembly gather at an International Convention to elect the members of the Universal House of Justice.

=== Non-partisanship ===
Shoghi Effendi sternly deprecated partisan politics and certain other practices current in western democracies, such as campaigning and nomination. As a result:

- Nominations and campaigning are prohibited. Baháʼís should not seek to promote themselves as candidates.
- Voters are urged not to consult with each other about the suitability of individuals.
- Voters should "exchange views . . . mix freely and discuss among themselves the requirements and qualifications” of assembly membership. The discussion however must not refer to particular individuals.
- Voters are strongly encouraged to study and discuss, in abstract, the qualities named by Shoghi Effendi as being necessary in those elected to serve, without reference to individuals. The qualities are “unquestioned loyalty, selfless devotion, well-trained mind, recognized ability and mature experience” and being “faithful, sincere, experienced, capable and competent”.
- Voter should act "without the least trace of passion or prejudice, and irrespective of any material considerations”

== Elected institutions ==
Sometimes referred to by Baháʼu'lláh as "the Rulers", Baháʼís elect members to councils which are vested with the authority of the community. The members of these councils, themselves, have no individual authority. When duly constituted, however, and specifically when deciding matters as a body, these councils act as the heads of the community. Baháʼu'lláh envisioned a Supreme House of Justice, with local Houses of Justice in every community where nine or more adult Baháʼís reside. ʻAbdu'l-Bahá unveiled the "Secondary", or National House of Justice in his will. Seen as embryonic institutions, national and local Houses of Justice are currently given the temporary appellation of "Spiritual Assemblies" and are expected, over time, to mature into fully functional Houses of Justice.

The Universal House of Justice is seen as morally infallible, though this belief has subtleties, in that the Universal House of Justice can both make new Baháʼí law and repeal its own laws. It may not alter the scriptural laws defined by Baháʼu'lláh and ʻAbdu'l-Bahá. National and Local Spiritual Assemblies are seen as requiring deference and obedience, but can be overruled by a superior elected institution. All decisions by these bodies must be made, and are considered valid if, and only if the body is duly constituted, and meeting as a body with a quorum of members present. These decisions are made through a specific process of consultation.

=== Universal House of Justice ===
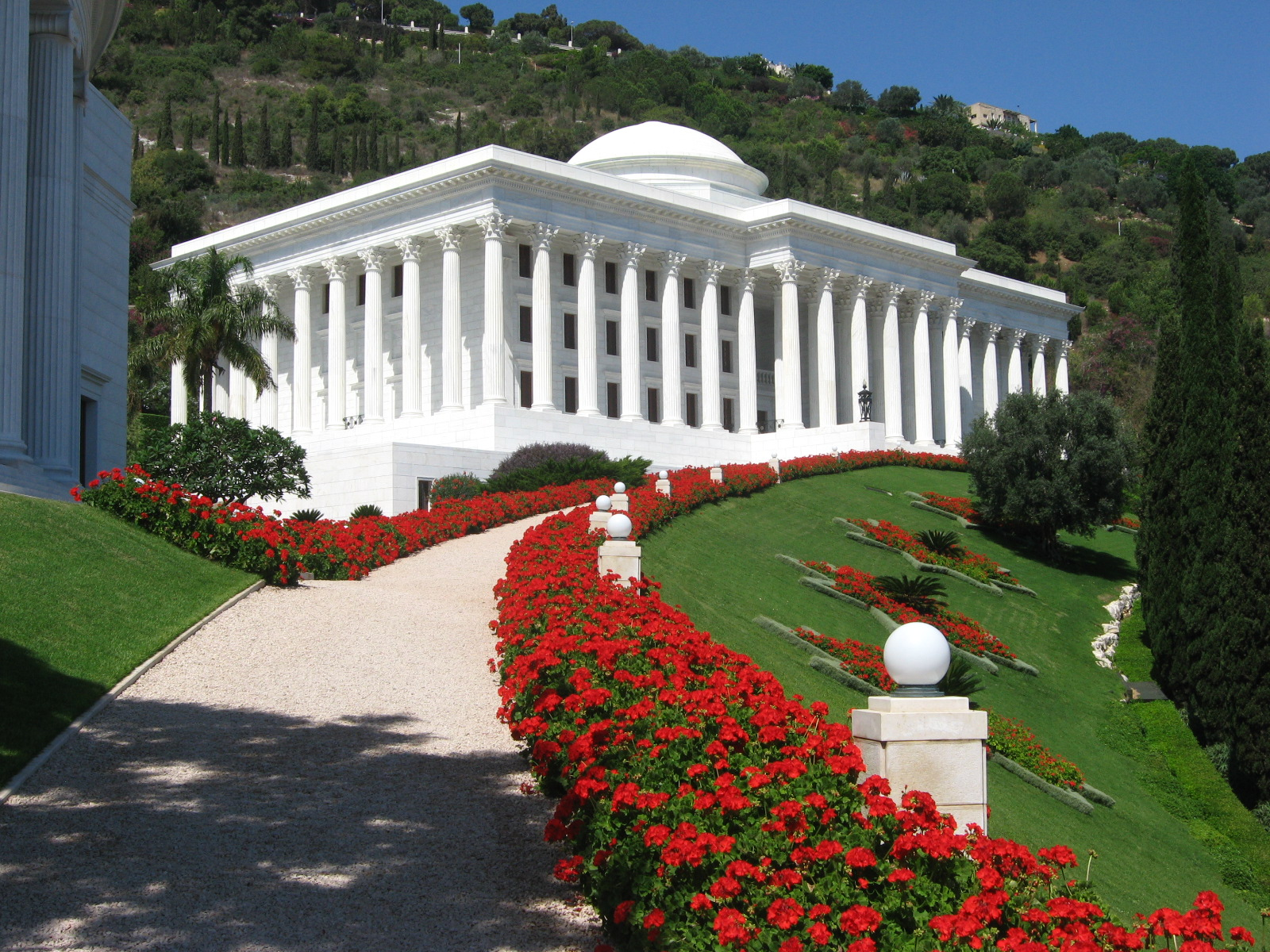
Seat of the Universal House of Justice in Haifa, Israel

Every five years from 1963, members of all National Spiritual Assemblies are called to vote at an International Convention at the Baháʼí World Centre in Haifa, Israel for members of the Universal House of Justice. These members act as delegates in a manner similar to National Baháʼí elections. Those who are unable to attend send postal ballots.

The Universal House of Justice is the supreme governing body of the Baháʼí Faith. The Baháʼí writings affirm that its decisions are "the source of all good and freed from all error".

=== National Spiritual Assemblies ===
A National Spiritual Assembly (NSA) normally represents a country, although sometimes regions are assigned their own NSA (e.g. Alaska). Sometimes several countries are grouped together into a single Assembly, for instance the Baltic States, or (originally) Canada and the United States. These boundaries are subject to the discretion of the Universal House of Justice, and can obviously change, Canada and the USA now having their own individual National Assemblies. These assemblies are elected annually through locally elected delegates.

National assemblies (or regional councils) appoint various committees and boards to implement various functions: Regional Institute Boards, Area Teaching Committees, Cluster Growth Facilitators, Cluster Institute Coordinators, Cluster Junior Youth Spiritual Empowerment Programme Coordinators, and Cluster Children's Class Coordinator being examples.

=== Regional Baháʼí Councils ===
Regional Baháʼí Councils (RBC) have also been established in several larger national Baháʼí communities as an intermediate level of administration between the national and local spiritual assemblies so as to provide a means of decentralized decision-making where this is desirable. It usually happens when the size of the country is very large (e.g. USA, and India). They act under the direction of a National Spiritual Assembly and are constituted in one of two ways. In some countries they are elected directly by members of the local Spiritual Assemblies in their jurisdiction, while in others the results of voting by Local Assemblies is received by the National Assembly as suggestions that the National Assembly can take into consideration in naming Regional Councils. They are increasingly taking on community growth and development activities, and provide guidance and structure for local communities' coordination on these.

=== Local Spiritual Assemblies ===
A Local Spiritual Assembly (LSA) represents a town, city, or county, and are elected annually by direct election. The Local Assemblies govern Baháʼí community life at the local level, and administer the affairs of the entire community, including coordinating the Nineteen Day Feast, holy day observances, funeral services, marriage counselling and many other tasks, though these are generally done through committee appointment.

== Appointed institutions ==
Baháʼu'lláh makes reference to "the learned" among his people. The functions of this branch were originally carried out by the Hands of the Cause of God appointed by Baháʼu'lláh, ʻAbdu'l-Bahá, and Shoghi Effendi. When it was determined that no more "Hands" could be appointed, the Universal House of Justice formed the Institution of the Counsellors to fulfill their duties. The appointed members act as individuals and they occupy a largely inspirational and advisory role. Their duties are divided into the two general categories of protection and propagation of the Baháʼí Faith.

=== International Counsellors ===
The International Counsellors are nine individuals appointed to the International Teaching Centre, which is a body that directly assists the Universal House of Justice at the Baháʼí World Centre. They advise Baháʼís at the international level and coordinate the efforts of the Continental Counsellors.

=== Continental Counsellors ===
Individual Counsellors are assigned to Continental Boards, where they interact directly with several National Spiritual Assemblies. They often act in an informational capacity, communicating the direction and discussions at the World Centre to national communities. They will often focus their work on one or a set of countries within their jurisdiction.

=== Auxiliary Boards ===
Auxiliary Boards are appointed by the Continental Counsellors to assist them on a smaller geographic scale. They work with any Local Spiritual Assemblies, Regional Councils, and individuals within their jurisdiction. There are typically two Boards in a single geographical region, one responsible for protection, and one for propagation of the community, though these functions often overlap. Both Boards report to the Continental Board that appointed them, regardless of their focus.

=== Assistants ===
Auxiliary Board members appoint "assistants" that operate on their behalf at the grassroots level. These assistants often meet with Local Spiritual Assemblies, speak at events, and are sought for advice by individual community members. They will sometimes have a very localized mandate, such as to focus on youth in a particular city, or they can be appointed broadly. Their role is as flexible as their Auxiliary Board member feels is appropriate.

== Historical foundation ==
=== During Baháʼu'lláh's lifetime ===
The earliest depiction of the administration currently at work within the worldwide Baháʼí community can be found in the writings of Baháʼu'lláh. Founded upon the belief that God guides humanity through messengers, many of whom have prophesied a "Kingdom of Heaven on earth", and the belief that Baháʼu'lláh's revelation is the fulfillment of such prophesies, Baháʼís see in his writings a system both of God and of the people.

Though Baháʼu'lláh intimated, earlier, many of the policies that would form the basis of the Baháʼí administrative system, his Kitáb-i-Aqdas provides the most solid initial glimpse of this system:

"The Lord hath ordained that in every city a House of Justice be established wherein shall gather counsellors to the number of Bahá, and should it exceed this number it doth not matter. They should consider themselves as entering the Court of the presence of God, the Exalted, the Most High, and as beholding Him Who is the Unseen. It behoveth them to be the trusted ones of the Merciful among men and to regard themselves as the guardians appointed of God for all that dwell on earth. It is incumbent upon them to take counsel together and to have regard for the interests of the servants of God, for His sake, even as they regard their own interests, and to choose that which is meet and seemly."

Over time, these concepts were clarified initially in Baháʼu'lláh's writings, and then in those of his eldest son and successor, ʻAbdu'l-Bahá.

=== ʻAbdu'l-Bahá's ministry ===
It was ʻAbdu'l-Bahá who clarified the differing roles of Supreme/Universal (global) vs. the local Houses of Justice. During ʻAbdu'l-Bahá's life, he oversaw and encouraged the establishment of many elected local councils, calling them "Spiritual Assemblies". He wrote many clarifying letters, giving instructions to various Spiritual Assemblies, inspiring the Baháʼí world. The Tablets of the Divine Plan stand out, however, and formed a great part of the early goal setting and planning processes of the nascent spiritual community. This plan opened up whole new geographic regions to the Baháʼís, ʻAbdu'l-Bahá encouraging Baháʼís to connect with the peoples of all races and cultures.

One of his greatest legacies to the development of the Baháʼí administrative system, however, was his will and testament, wherein he describes several new institutions. Clarifying Baháʼu'lláh's comments about his descendants and authority, he described the Institution of the Guardianship, which he saw as functioning in concert with the Universal House of Justice – one bearing responsibility for interpretation of scripture, the other as legislator of new law not covered by existing scripture. To these he commanded the obedience of the Baháʼís.

"The sacred and youthful branch, the Guardian of the Cause of God, as well as the Universal House of Justice to be universally elected and established, are both under the care and protection of the Abhá Beauty, under the shelter and unerring guidance of the Exalted One (may my life be offered up for them both). Whatsoever they decide is of God. Whoso obeyeth him not, neither obeyeth them, hath not obeyed God; whoso rebelleth against him and against them hath rebelled against God; whoso opposeth him hath opposed God; whoso contendeth with them hath contended with God; whoso disputeth with him hath disputed with God"

In this document, ʻAbdu'l-Bahá also:

- appointed his grandson Shoghi Effendi as the Guardian of the Cause of God
- established criteria for the appointment of future Guardians.
- defined a new scope of elected institution he called the "Secondary House of Justice", the first of which were elected under the administration of Shoghi Effendi.
- enjoined the believers to shun Covenant-breakers – Baháʼís who opposed the head of the faith and attempted to create a split or faction.
- defined some of the conditions for the future development of the Baháʼí administration.
- clarified the institution of the Hands of the Cause, and clarified the requirements for their appointment.

=== Shoghi Effendi's ministry ===
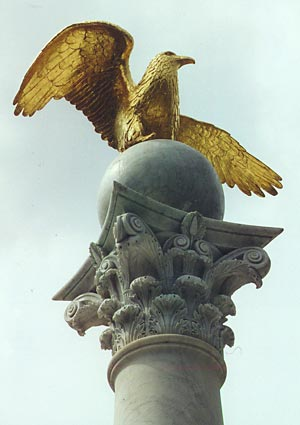
Shoghi Effendi's resting place in London at the New Southgate Cemetery

Under Shoghi Effendi, the Baháʼí Faith underwent its most dramatic shift in shape and process. While evolving from the skeletal structure established by Baháʼu'lláh and ʻAbdu'l-Bahá, Shoghi Effendi instituted large-scale campaigns of administrative consolidation, established practices and procedures for Baháʼí administrative bodies, appointed more Hands of the Cause, secured the legal position of the Baháʼí Community both in Haifa, but also, working with newly formed National Spiritual Assemblies, with many national governments. Over this period, Baháʼí institutions and inter-institutional collaboration became clearer, many finer points of Baháʼí law were explained, and the faith was spread to most of the globe. Baháʼí marriages became recognized in their own right in several regions and the Baháʼí Faith was recognized as an independent religion by many nations and religious courts, including Islamic religious courts in Egypt. Shoghi Effendi described the death of ʻAbdu'l-Bahá and the start of his own administration as the end of the "Heroic age" and the start of the "Formative" age of the Baháʼí Faith.

== Modern evolution ==
One hundred years after Baháʼu'lláh's death, the Baháʼís celebrated a "holy year", during which the fully authorized translation of the Kitáb-i-Aqdas (Most Holy Book) was published, coinciding with an increased implementation of Baháʼí law among non-Iranian Baháʼís and the maturation of the Spiritual Assemblies.

In 1997, the Universal House of Justice established Regional Bahá’í Councils in certain countries to provide an intermediary level of administration between the local and national levels.

== Response ==
Journalist and author Amanda Ripley in her 2021 book High Conflict: why we get trapped and how we get out, describes the Bahá'í administration electoral and system of governance saying "…everything about these elections is designed to reduce the odds of high conflict." indeed that "The Bahá'ís try to select people who do not crave attention and power." and "In every meeting, they follow a protocol called 'consultation,' and it’s designed to allow people to speak their mind without getting too attached to their own brilliance." In Ripley's summation "If social scientists designed a religion, it would look like this.… In this way, Baha’i elections are … designed to exploit the human capacity for cooperation, rather than competition."

== See also ==
- New world order (Baháʼí)
- Theodemocracy
