= Abd al-Hosayn Ayati =

Abd al Ḥosayn Ayati
- Abd al-Hosayn Ayati as a cleric (right) and as a Baháʼí (left)
- Born: 1871 Taft, Yazd, Sublime State of Persia
- Died: 1953 (aged 81–82) Yazd, Imperial State of Iran
- Occupation: Educator, Baháʼí teacher, poet
- Subject: Islam, Baháʼí Faith

Abd al Ḥosayn Ayati (1871—1953), known to Baháʼís as Avarih, was an Iranian convert to the Baháʼí Faith, who later converted back to Islam and wrote several polemic works against his former religion. In his later years heserved as a secondary school teacher while writing poetry and history, and was regarded as a competent orator.

During his 18 years as a Baháʼí, Ayati was a traveling teacher to Turkestan, the Caucasus, the Ottoman Empire, and Egypt. During this time he associated with ʻAbdu'l-Bahá and wrote a two-volume history of the Baháʼí Faith, al-Kawākeb al-dorrīya (1914), which was translated to Arabic in 1924.

After the death of ʻAbdu'l-Bahá, he insisted that the Universal House of Justice be formed immediately, hoping to attain a leading position in the Baháʼí community. However, Shoghi Effendi, the then head of the Baháʼí community, concluded that before the election of the Universal House of Justice—an international institution—Baháʼí elected institutions at lower levels, local and national, first had to be established. Ayati opposed Shoghi Effendi’s approach, began opposing him, wrote protest letters to Baháʼís, and eventually turned away from the Baháʼí Faith and, after eighteen years, returned to Islam. His main polemic writing refuting the Baháʼí Faith was the three-volume Kašf al-ḥīal (1928-31). He has a total of seventeen published titles on various subjects, such as the history of Yazd Ātaškada-ye yazdān (1928), and commentaries and translations of the Qur'an. He also published the periodical Namakdan for six years and was among the founding members of the Yazd Literary Society.

== Early life ==
Ayati was born in a religious family in the city of Taft in the province of Yazd, Iran in 1871. His father was a Mullah by the name of Mohammad-Taqi Akhund Tafti. Ayati received a religious education from childhood. At the age of 15 he moved to Yazd where he studied at the Khan religious school for two years in Islamic subjects. He then moved to Iraq to study at the seminaries in Najaf and Karbala where he became a student of Ayatollah Mirza Hasan Shirazi. This only lasted for a few months and he was forced to return to Yazd after receiving the news of the death of his father.

Ayati became a cleric in his youth while at Yazd and would give sermons and lead prayers. He showed great interest in literature and poetry. According to one of his brief autobiographies, he hadn't reached puberty yet when he was allowed to wear the classic Muslim cleric clothing and give sermons. At the age of twenty, he lost his father and at the age of twenty five, he was stationed as the Imam of the Mosque where his late father led prayers.

He became a Baháʼí at the age of 30. This is how Ayati describes it:

"I became familiar with the Baháʼís at the age of 30 and left my beloved homeland. I removed the Turban from my head and shaved my beard and started traveling around the world."

== Life as a Bahá'í ==
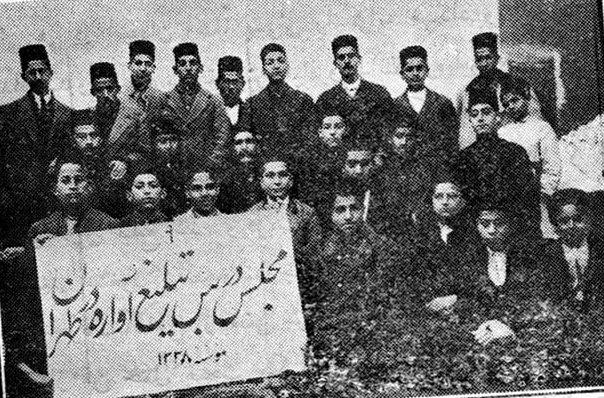
Avarih's teaching session in Tehran

After becoming a Baháʼí, Ayati traveled to Tehran, the Iranian capital, and then to many Iranian cities and provinces to teach the Baháʼí Faith. His travels to teach the Baháʼí Faith later took him outside Iran, and over a span of 18 years he traveled to Turkestan, the Caucasus, the Ottoman Empire, and Egypt.

In 1923, Shoghi Effendi sent Ayati to England to teach the Baháʼí Faith. This was first announced to the Baháʼís of the west through the Baháʼí Magazine, Star of the West. In a letter addressed to the Baha'is in Britain, Shoghi Effendi praised Ayati and his book al-Kawakib al-durriya.

The Former member of the Universal House of Justice, Luṭfu'lláh Ḥakím, served as his translator during this visit. Subsequent issues of Star of the West chronicled Avarih's Journey and activities while in England according to the following Table:

Year	Volume	No.	Pages
1923	14	1	20-22
1923	14	2	57
1923	14	3	91-93
1923	14	4	120
1923	14	5	136

Ayati then left England for Cairo to publish his two-volume history of the Baháʼí Faith, al-Kawakib al-durriya. The work received strong praise in contemporary Baháʼí publications and was described by Shoghi Effendi as one of the most reliable and comprehensive histories of the religion then available. Encyclopaedia Iranica later described it as one of the major works on the subject.

Avarih also produced a detailed account of the safekeeping and transportation of the remains of the Báb in his book, al-Kawakib al-durriya.

== Life after reverting to Islam ==
After the death of ʻAbdu'l-Bahá in 1921 and the succession of his eldest grandson, Shoghi Effendi, Ayati’s efforts to obtain leadership in the Baháʼí community proved ineffective. After some time, in about 1924–1925, he decided to leave the Baháʼí community and became Muslim again.

In about 1922–1923, Shoghi Effendi—the successor of ʻAbdu'l-Bahá—invited Ayati and several other prominent Baháʼís from various countries to Haifa in order to consult with them about the formation of the Universal House of Justice. Ayati arrived after the consultation session had ended, but found opportunities to converse with Shoghi Effendi about various subjects. After these consultations, Shoghi Effendi concluded that Baháʼí councils, known as Spiritual Assemblies, first had to be established at the local and national levels, so that the ground could be prepared for the election of the Universal House of Justice, an international institution elected directly by the National Spiritual Assemblies. Ayati was dissatisfied with this decision and persisted in his own view. A year later, he even hinted to Bahíyyih Khánum, the sister of ʻAbdu'l-Bahá, that if Shoghi Effendi did not act according to his opinion, he would stir up the Baháʼís of Iran against him.

During this period, he continued writing protest letters and insisting on his views in Iran. His actions, which caused tension and division in the Baháʼí community, led the Spiritual Assembly of Tehran to seek guidance from Shoghi Effendi. Shoghi Effendi asked that institution to protect the Baháʼís from Ayati’s actions. After this, Ayati began writing insulting letters to Shoghi Effendi and threatened to destroy the Baháʼí Faith. After this, the Baháʼí community largely disregarded him.

After separating from the Baháʼí Faith, he settled in Tehran and spent the rest of his life teaching in high school. In Tehran he wrote the three-volume Kashf al-Hiyal, a polemical critique of the Baháʼí Faith.

He then turned to literary research and, in about 1929–1930, founded a literary-critical journal called Namakdan, which was published irregularly for several years. During this period, under his new pen name “Ayati”, he continued to compose poetry. In about 1932–1933 he moved to Yazd and began teaching in high schools, and eventually died in that city.

== Works ==
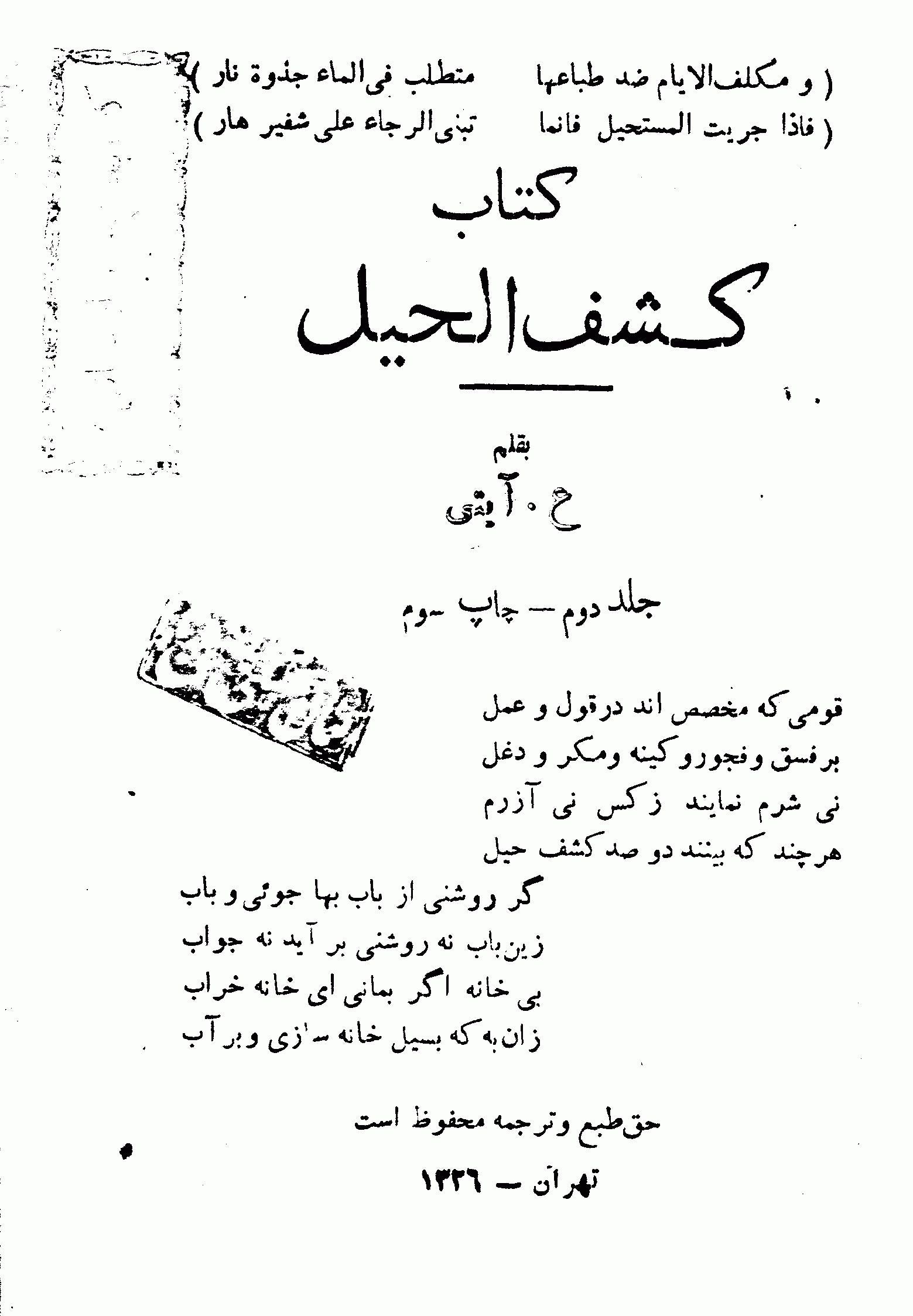
Kašf al-ḥīal

Ayati's works are mainly focused on history, literature and poetry, Islamic religious topics, and criticism of the Baha'i Faith. According to Ayati his Persian and Arabic poems amounted to about 30,000 lines.

The following is a list of some works by Ayati in alphabetical order:

- َAl-Kawākeb al-dorrīya fī maʾāṯer al-bahāʾīya (Shining Stars of Baháʼí Remnants): a work on history of the Baháʼí Faith.
- Asha'yi Hayat (The Rays of Life): A collection of poems that he composed at the age of eighty (Yazd: 1949)
- Atashkadeh Yazdan (God's Fireplace): A book on the history of the city of Yazd in Iran.
- Chakame shamshir (Ode of the Sword): A poetry collection.
- Farhang-i Ayati (Ayati's Dictionary): A Persian-Arabic dictionary.
- Goftare Ayati (Ayaty's statements): Printed in Tehran (1929).
- Heralds of the New Day: Adapted from addresses given in London by Jináb-i-Avárih.
- Hogoye Irani (The Persian Hugo): Printed in Yazd (1942).
- Insha `alee (Good writing): Printed in Tabriz (1932).
- Kašf al-ḥīal (Uncovering the Deceptions): His work in three volumes critical of the Baháʼí Faith.
- Kherad name (A letter of Wisdom): A collection of romantic poems printed in Istanbul.
- Kitabi Nubi (Nubi's Book): A translation of the Quran in 3 volumes printed in Yazd (1945-1947).
- Maliki aql wa efrit jahl (The Angel of Intellect and the Monster of Ignorance): Printed in Tehran (1933).
- Moballighe Baha'i dar mahzar-e ayatollah shaykh mohammad khalesi zadeh (A Baháʼí Teacher in the Presence of Shaykh Muhammad Khalesi Zadeh): A report about Iranian Army personnel from Yazd who were taught the Baháʼí Faith by a Baháʼí teacher and decided to consult Ayatollah Khalesizadeh about the teacher's claims.
- Naghmeye del (Melody of the Heart): A poetry collection.
- Namakdan (Saltshaker): A literature magazine published from 1925-1935 in four issues.
- Qasideye Quraniyeh (The Quranic Poem): A collection of poetry printed in Tehran.
- Rawish-e negaresh-e farsi (How to write in Persian): A guide on writing in Persian printed in Tehran.
- Siyahat nam-i doctor jack amricaiee (The travel diary of Dr. Jack, the American): Real life accounts narrated as a story about the life of a foreigner investigating the Baháʼí claims during his travels that Ayati refers to using the pseudonym, Jack the American.
- Tarikh mukhtasar-e falsafe (A Brief History of Philosophy): Printed in Tehran (1933)
- Tafsir quran (An exegesis on the Quran): In three volumes.

== Sources ==
- Taherzadeh, Adib (2000). Child of the Covenant. Oxford: George Ronald. ISBN 0-85398-439-5.
- Khalkhali, Abdolhamid. Tazkereh-ye Shoʻarā-ye Moʻāser-e Irān (in Persian).
- Dehghanian, Narges (24 March 2009). "Namakdan, daftar-e adabiyāt, sheʻr va naghẓ-e dowreh-ye Pahlavi-ye avval". Payām-e Bahārestān (in Persian). 83 (1): 473–478.
- Mousavi Bojnourdi, Kazem. "Ayati". Great Islamic Encyclopedia (in Persian). Archived from the original on 18 December 2010.
- Tabari, Ehsan. Iran dar do sadeh-ye vāpasin (in Persian).
- Smith, Peter (2000). A Concise Encyclopedia of the Baháʼí Faith. Oxford: Oneworld. ISBN 1-85168-184-1.
- "Abd al-Husayn Ayati Bafqi Yazdi" (in Persian).
- Afshar, Iraj (2011-08-18). "ĀYATĪ, ʿABD-AL-ḤOSAYN". Encyclopædia Iranica.
- Ayati, Abd al-Husayn (1914) [Arabic tr. published 1924, Digitally republished 1999 by H-Net]. Al-Kawakib ad-Durriyyah [Brilliant Stars] (in Persian). Vol. 1. Cairo, Egypt: Matba`at as-Sa`adah.
- Burqaie, Sayyed Muhammad Baqir (1994). سخنوران نامی عاصر ایران (PDF). Vol. 1. Qum: Khorram. p. 134.
- Khalkhali, Sayyed Abd al-hamid (1958). تذکره شعرای معاصر ایران (PDF). Vol. 2. Tehran: Rangin. pp. 1–6.
- Narges, Dehghanian (2009). نمکدان دفتر ادبیات شعر و نغز دوره اول پهلوی (PDF). Payame Baharestan. 1388 (3): 473–478.
- Rastegar, Sayyed Mahmoud (1978). احوال و آثاز عبدالحسین آیتی یزدی [The life and works of Abd al-Husayn Ayati Yazdi]. Wahid. 242: 29–34.
- "Jenabe Avareh in England" (PDF). Star of the West. 13: 345. 1923.
- "A Letter to the Friends in Great Britain" (PDF). Star of the West. 13: 329. 1923. Archived from the original (PDF) on 2016-03-22.
- "New Books" (PDF). Star of the West. 14: 93. 1923. Archived from the original (PDF) on 2016-03-22.
- "Heralds of the New Day" (PDF). Star of the West. 14: 269. 1923. Archived from the original (PDF) on 2016-03-22.
- "Star of the West/Volume 14/Issue 1/Text". Bahaiworks.
- "Star of the West/Volume 14/Issue 9/Text". Bahaiworks.
- "Bahá'í Reference Library - The Light of Divine Guidance (Volume 2), Page 6". Bahá'í Reference Library.
- "Efforts to preserve the remains of the Bab". Bahai-Library.com.
- آیتی [Ayati]. The Center for the Great Islamic Encyclopedia.
- Ayati, Abd al-Husayn (1927). سیاحت نامه دکتر ژاک آمریکایی (PDF). Tehran: Khavar.
- Ayati, Abd al-Husayn (1935). فرهنگ آیتی. Tehran: Matba Danesh. Archived from the original on 2021-05-18.
- Ayati, Abd al-Husayn (1938). آتشکده یزدان.
- Ayati, Abd al-Husayn (1987). مبلغ بهایی در محضر آیت الله خالصی زاده (PDF). Yazd, Iran: Golbahar.
