= Palestinian Baháʼís =

Palestinians who practise the Baháʼí Faith

Palestinian Baháʼís are Palestinian Arabs who practise the Baháʼí Faith. Palestinian Baháʼís constitute one of the earliest Baháʼí Faith practitioners because two of the holiest Baháʼí cities, Haifa and Acre, are located in places where Palestinians previously constituted a majority of the population prior to the 1948 Palestinian expulsion and flight. The contemporary ban on seeking proselytizing to Israelis was originally conceived of as a ban on proselytizing to Palestinians. During the Mandatory Palestine period, Palestinians Baháʼís were one of eight categories as options on the censuses carried out by the former British protectorate.

According to Naim Ateek, in the modern era, there are Palestinian Baháʼís who live alongside Palestinians of other religious persuasions. Author Alan Bryson has reported the existence of Palestinian Baháʼís in the West Bank. On occasion, there are Palestinian Baháʼís who were raised in another Abrahamic religion, but thereafter converted to the Baháʼí Faith.

== Notable Palestinian Baháʼís ==
- Maliheh Afnan
- Soheil Afnan
- Suheil Bushrui
- Leila Shahid (not a Bahá'í herself, but from a formerly Bahá'í family)
- Munib Shahid

== See also ==
- Baháʼu'lláh's family
- Afnan
