= Auguste Forel and the Baháʼí Faith =

Swiss psychiatrist and myrmecologist

August Henri Forel (1 September 1848 – 27 July 1931), Swiss psychiatrist, neuroanatomist, myrmecologist and eugenicist, became a member of the Bahá’í Faith in 1921. At the end of December 1920 he had written a letter to ‘Abdu’l-Bahá explaining his relationship with science, his problem accepting that the mind is separate from the soul and that the soul survives after death, and stating that he was an agnostic. Having asked ‘Abdu’l-Bahá if he could consider himself a Bahá’í despite his reservations, he nevertheless made a personal decision that his beliefs were in accordance with becoming a member of the Bahá’í Faith. ‘Abdu’l-Bahá’ died on 28 November 1921, his response to Forel's letter eventually arriving in March 1922. Known as the Tablet to Dr. Auguste Forel, ‘Abdu’l-Bahá’s grandson, Shoghi Effendi, later referred to it as being "one of the most weighty" that ‘Abdu’l-Bahá had ever written.

== Initial encounter with the Baháʼí Faith ==
Auguste Forel received his religious education from his Protestant mother, who taught him that both the Old and New Testaments of the Bible were the revealed Word of God. By the time he was 16 he was already filled with doubt, and any hopes he had of a miracle conversion having failed to materialise he later noted that "In the quiet meadows round my home I had often cried in despair to the so-called personal God: 'If you really exist, destroy me here and now; then I shall know that you exist, but otherwise I cannot believe in your existence!' But all was silent; I was not destroyed".

Forel's first encounter with the Baháʼí Faith was through his daughter Martha and her husband, Dr. Arthur Brauns, who became adherents of the Faith in Karlsruhe, in 1920. Forel referred to this period and his initial contact with the Baháʼí Faith in Ethik der Zukunft, which he personally considered as being one of his most important works, and in which he stated that before knowing anything about the Baháʼí Faith he had written an article entitled the Religion of Social Good, calling for people of any denomination to create an ethical organisation based on "this life" rather than the afterlife. He also described how, on coming across the teachings of Baháʼu'lláh which centred on the unity of religions for the good of all mankind, he decided to become a Bahá’í, associating himself with the Bahá’ís in Karlsruhe.

Several years later Forel made reference to Religion of Social Good in another article, The World Vision of a Savant, in which he explained that on completing it in March 1919 he added the words "Scientific Religion". He further explained that on coming across the Bahá’í Movement at the home of his son-in-law and writing a letter to ʻAbdu'l-Bahá soon afterwards, he withdrew his Scientific Religion of Social Good as being unnecessary given what he had discovered in the Bahá’í teachings.

In a Codicil which Forel added to his will in August 1921, and which was included by the editor in his memoir, Out of My Life and Work, he stated that in 1920, at Karlsruhe, he first made acquaintance with the "supraconfessional world-religion of the Bahá’í —", also expressing an ardent wish that the Bahá’í religion would "live and prosper for the good of mankind".

== Correspondence with ‘Abdu’l-Bahá. ==
On December 28, 1920, Forel sent a letter to ‘Abdu’l-Bahá, giving a description of his beliefs, information concerning Bahá’í literature he had read, and expressing his amazement at ‘Abdu’l-Bahá’s clarity of vision. He explained that at the age of 72 he was still thrilled by "the truths of science", having written extensively on the behaviour of ants, the anatomy of the brain and other scientific subjects, and went on to explain that he was a monist, believing that the function of the brain and mind “or soul“ are inseparable. It was for this reason, he wrote, that he was unable to believe that the soul survives after death. He also pointed out that he was completely agnostic, “like the philosopher Socrates or the great naturalist Darwin“, and finished his letter by asking if, given his agnosticism, he could belong to the Bahá’í Faith.

Forel didn't wait for ‘Abdu’l-Bahá’s response before deciding that his beliefs were in accordance with becoming a member of the Bahá’í Faith, and according to a letter which he wrote to the editor of the Bahá’í magazine Sonne de Wahrheit, his decision was influenced by an article printed in the same magazine in March 1921, using a transcript of conversations which had taken place between ‘Abdu’l-Bahá and Dr. J. Fallscheer [Josephina Theresia Zürcher]. The article in question concerned the story of creation as recorded in Genesis in relation to Darwin's theory of evolution, stating that creation was a “progressive process“, and that the theories of Darwin and the monists, rather than being simply “materialistic, atheistic ideas“, are “religious truths which the godless and the deluded have unjustifiably used in their campaign against religion and the Bible“.

‘Abdu’l-Bahá’ died on 28 November 1921; his response to Forel's letter of December 28, 1920, with the title Tablet to Dr. Auguste Forel, eventually arrived in March 1922, accompanied by a letter of explanation from ‘Abdu’l-Bahá’s grandson, Shoghi Effendi, who later referred to the Tablet as being “one of the most weighty“ that ‘Abdu’l-Bahá ever wrote. In his letter to Forel Shoghi Effendi expressed his regret regarding the time it had taken the Tablet to reach him, referred to the grief which ‘Abdu’l-Bahá's sudden passing had caused, and affirmed that had it not been for the process of procuring good English and French translations, ‘Abdu’l-Bahá’s response would have arrived much sooner. Shoghi Effendi also informed Forel that an English version had been sent to a Mr. A. Isfahání, who Forel was acquainted with, and expressed his decision to wait for Forel’s approval before sharing it with the Bahá’ís of the world.

Forel lost no time in responding to Shoghi Effendi’s letter, acknowledging receipt of the various translations, expressing his grief on learning of ‘Abdu’l-Bahá's passing, and giving permission for the Tablet to be distributed. He also mentioned having asked ‘Abdu’l-Bahá’ a question which, due to ‘Abdu’l-Bahá’s passing, hadn’t been answered, and which he hoped Shoghi Effendi would answer in his place, explaining that through his study of science he believed the human soul, with its ability to feel and understand, to be identical with the workings of the brain, and asking if, despite this belief, he could be considered as being a Bahá’í. No record exists of a response to Forel from Shoghi Effendi, as is also the case in regard to most of the correspondence between them, despite Forel noting that they corresponded “often“ and “assiduously“. However, in a letter written in 1931 by Shoghi Effendi to Martha Brauns-Forel, Forel's daughter, following Forel's death, Shoghi Effendi stated that despite Forel's lack of understanding regarding fundamental aspects of the Bahá’í Faith, there was no doubt that ‘Abdu’l-Bahá’s Tablet had brought about significant changes in his monist philosophy and opened the way to him being able to accept the Faith, albeit with a “partial glimpse of the Bahá’í Revelation.“

== Bahá’í activities, publications and correspondence. ==
When Forel declared his belief as a Bahá’í in 1921 he was 73 and beset with physical disabilities, including a paralysed right side as a result of two strokes, and glaucoma in both eyes, for which he had undergone surgery. Despite bemoaning his frailty and regretting that he felt unable to "do more … for humanity", he nevertheless managed to contribute time and energy to promoting the Faith. In his article, World unity on our Small Terrestrial Globe, he pointed out that becoming a member of the Bahá’í Faith and establishing Bahá’í groups was one way in which to work towards world unity, which he focused on as soon as becoming a Bahá’í. Shortly after the passing of ‘Abdu’l-Bahá, correspondence between Forel and Mr. ‘Abdu’l-Husayn Isfahání addressed the importance of carrying on ‘Abdu’l-Bahá's work, and by the end of March 1922 tentative plans were underway for the founding of a Bahá’í group in Lausanne, with the first meeting taking place on 13 May 1922. The Bahá’í Group also produced printed materials including a list of Bahá’í principles, which Forel also included in a letter to the French Minister of Foreign Affairs in April 1925.

Eager to proclaim his endorsement of the Bahá’í teachings, Forel contributed articles for Bahá’í publications, as well as personal works including Philosophie Popular, Mensonge ou Erreur chez l’homie Normal, Der Weg zur Culture, and Les Etats Unis de la Terre, originally written in 1914 before the concept of a League of Nations had been born, with an appendix added later devoted to the Bahá’í Faith. In January 1922 his article L’action morale et l’education sociale, which was devoted entirely to the Bahá’í Faith, and which he considered as being one of his most important, appeared in the first edition of a publication entitled Aujourd’hui, reappearing in April of the same year in L'Idée libre with the new title, La Religion des Béhá’ís. In 1923 J.E. Esslemont's book, Baha’u’llah and the New Era, was published in England, and after having read it Forel prepared a summary which he published in several newspapers, causing a reaction in one by unreservedly stating, “Let us all, men and women alike, now become Bahá’ís".

Forel corresponded with several prominent Bahá’ís in Europe, Persia and the US, including the travelling teacher Martha Root, who he met in person in 1929 during her visit to Switzerland. Her impression of Forel was of a truly “glorious and loving apostle of Bahá’u’lláh“, who shared the Bahá’i teachings with “every educator in Switzerland“, and who was one of the most intelligent, kind and just humanitarians she had ever come across.

== Defence of the Bahá’í Faith ==
The founding of the Pahlavi dynasty by Reza Shah in Persia in 1925 gave rise to an outburst of persecutions against the Bahá’í community. When Forel became aware of these persecutions through communication from Shoghi Effendi he took immediate action by bringing the situation to the attention of the European public. As early as the first week of April 1925 Forel sent a letter to Édouard Herriot - French President of the Council and Minister of Foreign Affairs, giving details of the atrocities being perpetrated and requesting the European press and governments to do all in their power to stop them, "or at least to limit them as much as possible". Forel followed this letter by writing to the Neue Freie Presse of Vienna with the title, "A Persecuted Religion: Islamic cruelties against the Bahá’ís", and a few days following publication Forel received a letter from J. E. Esslemont on behalf of Shoghi Effendi, thanking him for the article and asking if it might be possible to arrange for it to be published in additional newspapers. Shortly after a Turkish translation appeared in a "progressive Istanbul newspaper", Shoghi Effendi sent a cable to Forel, expressing his delight at the article in the Viennese journal and commenting that it had achieved a "notable result". When persecution increased a year later, Forel wrote an article to the Neue Zurcher Zeitung, which he also sent to Sir Eric Drummond, Secretary-General of the League of Nations accompanied by a personal message. However, the response wasn't encouraging, pointing out that the League of Nations was only able to undertake such action if a state, or country, had accepted an international agreement concerning the protection of minorities, which Persia had not.

On 27 April 1927 Shoghi Effendi sent a message to the Bahá’í's of the west, informing them of the recent martyrdom of yet another Bahá’í in Persia. A copy of the message was included in a letter sent by Shoghi Effendi to Forel, asking him to share this latest development with newspapers in Germany and Switzerland. According to his notes on the letter, Forel duly sent the news to various publications, including the Austrian daily newspaper, Neues Wiener Abendblatt on 10 June 1927 under the title "Martyr of a new Religion: Murder of a Bahá’í".

In November 1927 Forel wrote to Mustafa Kemal Atatürk, the father of modern Turkey, including in it the Bahá’í Principles which he and the first Bahá’í community of Lausanne had published in 1922. He began his letter by praising Atatürk for his six-day speech, before informing him of an article which he had written for a German publication about the Bahá’ís, and which had been translated into Turkish and published in a progressive newspaper in Istanbul. Drawing his attention to the Bahá’í Principles, Forel suggested that should Atatürk declare the Bahá’í Faith to be an official religion of Turkey, "in addition to Islam", not only would he be contributing to progress, but he would also offer an example to the whole of Europe and all nations of the world. Several months later the Turkish government ordered the police in Smyrna to investigate the activities of the local Bahá’ís, and when the chairman of the Local Spiritual Assembly of Constantinople travelled to Smyrna in order to offer his support, he and the other members of the LSA were arrested, with all Bahá’í literature confiscated from their houses. Whether or not Forel's letter to Atatürk had any bearing on what took place following this incident is not known, but thankfully not only were the books returned but publicity in several newspapers lead to the government relaxing its harsh ban on the Bahá’í community in Turkey.

== Funeral oration ==
Forel died on 27 July 1931. He had written his own funeral oration in 1912, adding a Codicil in 1921 following his allegiance to the Bahá’í Faith, which was included by the editor in Forel's memoir, Out of My Life and Work. At his funeral on 29 July 1931, in front of the hundreds of friends and colleagues gathered, his son read the oration, which included Forel's affirmation that in 1920, at Karlsruhe, he first made acquaintance with the “supraconfessional world-religion of the Bahá’ís —“, and further stating, “this is the true religion of human social good, without dogmas or priests, uniting all men on this small terrestrial globe of ours. I have become a Bahá’í. May this religion live and prosper for the good of mankind, this is my most ardent wish.“

== See also ==
- Tablet to Dr. Forel
