= Afnán =

Any maternal relative of the Báb in the Baháʼí Faith

Afnán (Arabic: ﺍﻓﻨﺎﻥ, "Branches") is a term in literature of the Baháʼí Faith referring to maternal relatives of the Báb, and is used as a surname by their descendants.

The Báb's wife was named Khadíjih-Bagum, who had two brothers, Hajjí Mírzá Abu'l-Qasim and Hajjí Mírzá Siyyid Hasan. The descendants of these two brothers-in-law of the Báb, along with the descendants of his maternal uncles are known as the Afnán. The Afnán are of the Sayyid class, i.e. claiming descent from the Islamic Prophet Muhammad.

In the late 19th century the family established a large trading business based in Shiraz and Yazd in Iran, with offices in Beirut, Bombay, Hong Kong and ʻIshqábád. They published some of the first Baháʼí literature from their printing press in Bombay.

Baháʼí scriptures grant a special station to the members of the Afnán, indicating that Baháʼís should treat them with particular respect and courtesy, but do not grant them any administrative or spiritual authority within the Baháʼí Faith.

== List of Afnán ==
- Hasan M. Balyuzi - British Iranian Baha'i leader and writer
- Leila Shahid - Palestinian diplomat
- Maliheh Afnan - a Palestinian-born artist
- Munib Shahid - former chairman of hematology and oncology at the Faculty of Medicine of the American University of Beirut
- Soheil Afnan - Palestinian-born Persian scholar of philosophy and language
- Shoghi Effendi - Guardian of the Baháʼí Faith
- Vakílu'd-Dawlih - Apostle of Baháʼu'lláh

== See also ==
- Baháʼu'lláh's family
