= Vakílu'd-Dawlih =

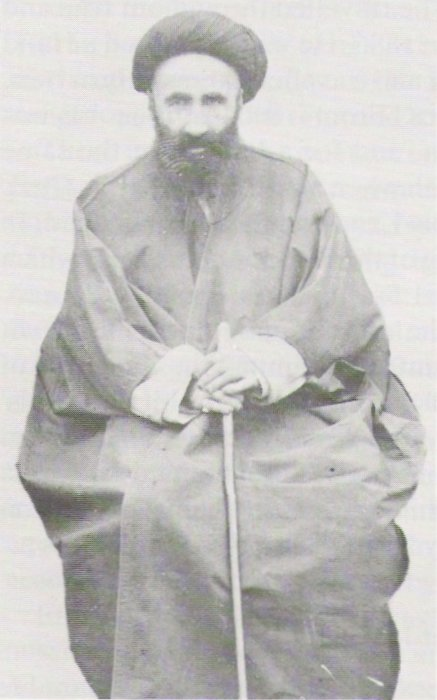
Vakílu'd-Dawlih.

Afnán-i-Yazdí (Persian: افنان يزدی, surnamed Vakílu'd-Dawlih; 1830 – 1909), also known as Ḥájí Mírzá Muḥammad-Taqí, was an eminent follower of Baháʼu'lláh, the founder of the Baháʼí Faith. He is identified as one of the nineteen Apostles of Baháʼu'lláh.

He was an Afnán, a cousin of the Báb and the chief builder of the first Baháʼí House of Worship in ʻIshqábád, present day Turkmenistan, which was initiated by ʻAbdu'l-Bahá in or about 1902.
