= Serene Husseini Shahid =

Palestinian writer

Serene al-Husayni
- سيرين حُسيني شهيد
- Born: 1920; Jerusalem
- Died: 2008 (aged 87–88)
- Spouse: Munib Shahid
- Children: Leila Shahid (m. Mohammed Berrada); Maya Shahid (m. David Corm); Zeina Shahid (m. Souheil Rached)
- Parent: Jamal al-Husayni

Serene Husseini Shahid (Arabic: سيرين حُسيني شهيد, French: Sirine Husseini Shahid; 1920–2008) was a teacher, writer, and scholar of Palestinian embroidery.

== Family and education ==
Shahid was born in Jerusalem as a member of the influential Husayni family. Her father was Jamal al-Husayni (himself a second cousin of the then Grand Mufti of Jerusalem Amin al-Husseini), her maternal grandfather was Mayor of Jerusalem Faidi al-Alami, and her maternal uncle was Musa al-Alami. She was educated at the Ramallah Friends School in Ramallah, later at the American University of Beirut.

She married Munib Shahid, son of a noble family of Baháʼí lineage, in 1944 and they settled down in Beirut. Her daughter Leila Shahid was Palestinian envoy to European Commission. Her other two daughters, Maya and Zeina, designed and promoted Palestinian Embroideries for Inaash.

== Career ==
After 1967 she became involved in starting "cottage industries" among the Palestinian refugees. She worked on embroidery projects for Palestinian women, conducting embroidery workshops on weekdays. She, together with Huguette Caland, helped found the Association for the Development of Palestinian Camps, a.k.a. "Inaash" (founded 1969) in Lebanon, an association devoted to preserving Traditional Palestinian Embroidery and helping women and children in Palestinian Refugee Camps in Lebanon. At the same time she wrote about Palestinian costumes and embroidery and helped arrange exhibitions, including one in the Museum of Mankind in the British Museum in 1991. She also donated items to the Palestine Costume Archive.

Her autobiography, Jerusalem Memories, was published in 2000, and was described by Malu Halasa as having "broke[n] with tradition". It has been translated into several languages.

== Bibliography ==
- Weir, Shelagh and Shahid, Serene: Palestinian embroidery : cross-stitch patterns from the traditional costumes of the village women of Palestine. London: British Museum publications, c1988. ISBN 0-7141-1591-6
- Shahid, Serene Hussein (Editor: Jean Said Makdisi), (Introduction - Edward W. Said): Jerusalem Memories, Naufal, Beirut, 2000. First Edition.
  - Jerusalem Passages, (excerpts from Jerusalem Memories), Spring 2000, Issue 8, Jerusalem Quarterly

== See also ==
- Palestinian costumes
