= Tablet to Dr. Forel =

1921 letter written by `Abdu'l-Bahá in response to questions of Auguste Forel

The Tablet to Dr. Auguste Forel is a letter of ʻAbdu'l-Bahá (1844–1921), written on 21 September 1921 in reply to questions asked by Auguste-Henri Forel (1848–1931), a Swiss myrmecologist, neuroanatomist and psychiatrist. It first appeared in print in Persian in 1922, and was then translated into English in 1976.

In this tablet which is considered ʻAbdu'l-Bahá's last significant philosophical work; ʻAbdu'l-Bahá discusses the differences between the mineral, vegetable, animal and human worlds, the spiritual nature of man and proofs of the existence of God. It also expounds the logical necessity of the existence of the mind, and the relationship between the faculties of the mind and the human soul.

This letter was used as a model by William S. Hatcher (1935–2005) in his 1994 article entitled "A Scientific Proof of the Existence of God", first published in Russian in March 1992 under the title: "Научное доказательство существования бога".

== See also ==
- Auguste Forel and the Baháʼí Faith
- Some Answered Questions
