= Bursalı Mehmet Tahir Bey =

Turkish writer (1861–1925)

Mehmet Tahir Bey
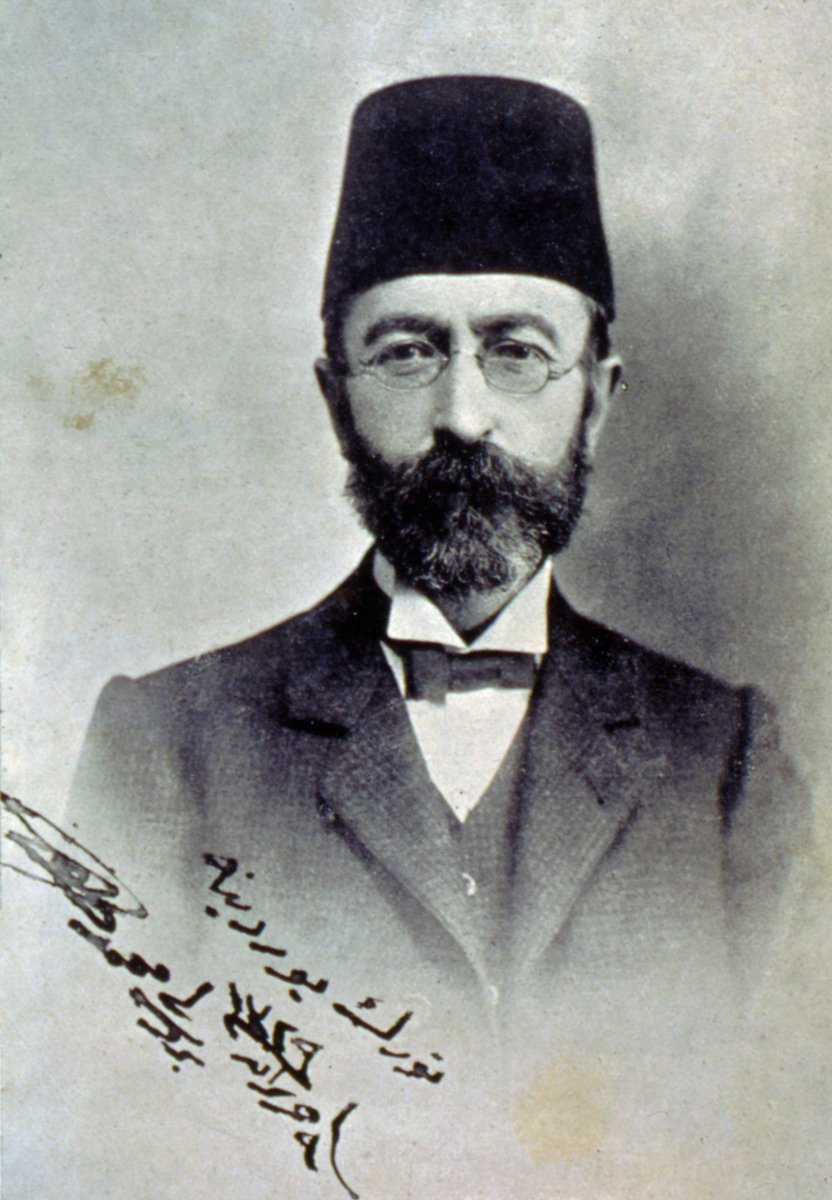

Member of the Ottoman Parliament
- In office 1908–1912

Personal details
- Born: 1861 Bursa, Ottoman Empire
- Died: 1925 (aged 63–64) Istanbul, Turkey
- Occupation: Writer, researcher.
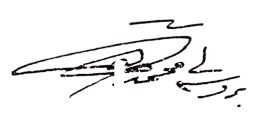
- Signature

Bursalı Mehmed Tahir Bey (1861–1925) was a Turkish writer, researcher, and soldier. He is known for his biography and bibliography containing "Ottoman authors", a source book encyclopedia which still continues to be regarded as a basic reference.

== Biography ==
Born in Bursa in 1861, Mehmet Tahir Bey joined the Ottoman Army to complete his national service. He furthermore was a member of the Ottoman Parliament between 1908 and 1912. He was one of the first members of the Vatan ve Hürriyet organization in Thessaloniki.

Mehmet Tahir Bey died in 1925 in Istanbul.
