= Leila Shahid =

Palestinian diplomat (1949–2026)

- ليلى شهيد
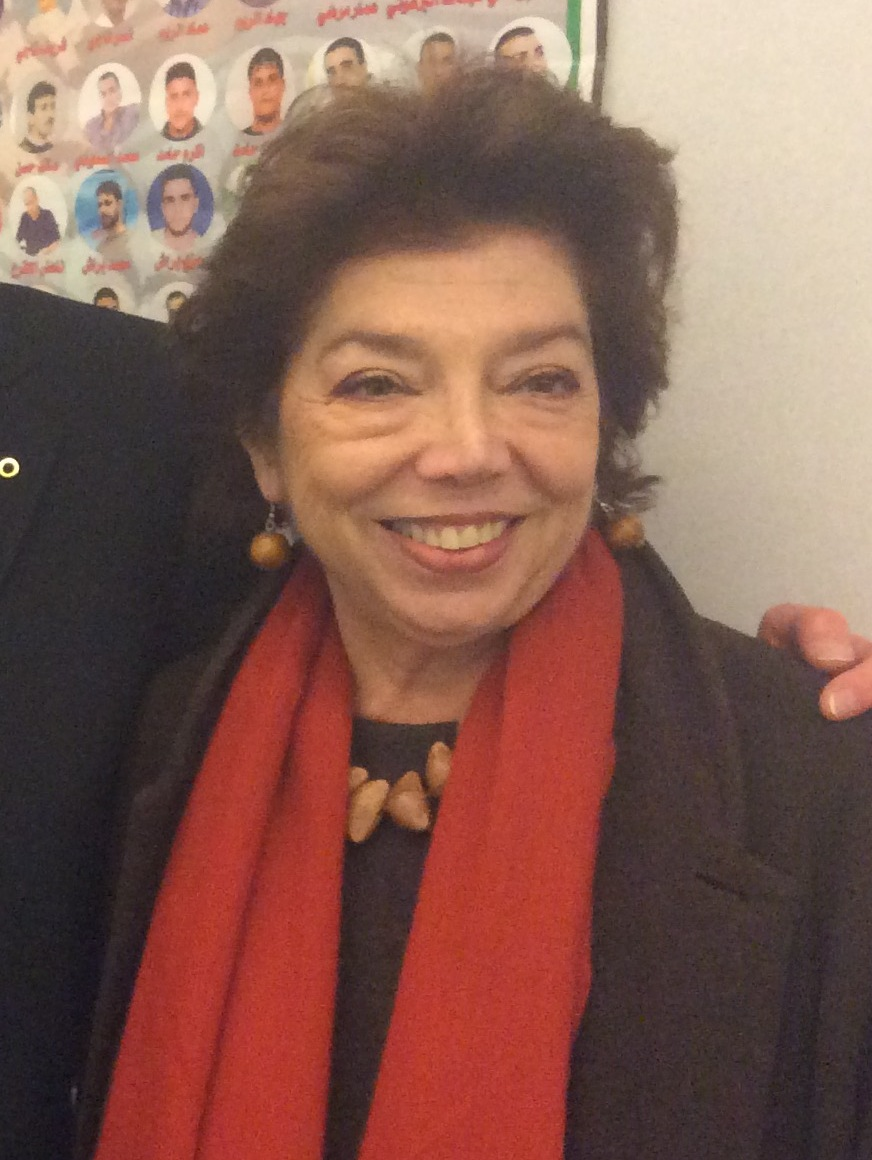
- Shahid in 2015

General Delegate of Palestine in the EU, Belgium and Luxembourg
- In office 2006–2014

Delegate General of Palestine in France
- In office 1993–2006

PLO representative in the Netherlands
- In office 1990–1993

PLO representative in Ireland
- In office 1989–1990

Personal details
- Born: 13 July 1949 Beirut, Lebanon
- Died: 18 February 2026 (aged 76) Lecques, France
- Parents: Munib Shahid; Serene Husseini Shahid
- Relatives: Baha'u'llah (great-great-grandfather)
- Education: American University of Beirut
- Occupation: Diplomat; anthropologist

Leila Shahid (Arabic: ليلى شهيد; 13 July 1949 – 18 February 2026) was a Palestinian diplomat. She was the first woman ambassador of Palestine, serving the Palestine Liberation Organization (PLO) in Ireland in 1989 and the Netherlands in 1990, then serving the Palestinian Authority (PA) in France where she had taken office in Paris in 1993. From 2006 to 2014, she was the General Delegate of Palestine in the European Union, Belgium and Luxembourg.

== Early life ==
Born in Beirut, Lebanon. Shahid was the daughter of Munib Shahid and Serene Husseini Shahid and was related to the Al-Husayni clan. She also had paternal Baháʼí heritage. Her parents were from Acre and Jerusalem, but she grew up with her two sisters in exile in Lebanon. After studying anthropology and psychology at the American University of Beirut, Shahid worked in Palestinian refugee camps until 1974 when she began her doctorate in anthropology in Paris, where she met French writer Jean Genet. In 1976, she was elected president of the Union of Palestinian students in France.

== Career ==
In September 1982, Shahid and Jean Genet went to Beirut, Jordan, during the Sabra and Shatila massacre. Genet's account was published in La revue d'études palestiniennes (The Review of Palestinian Studies), in an article entitled "Quatre heures à Chatila" (Four Hours at Chatila) which later served as the basis for Catherine Biscovitch's film "Dancing Among the Dead". While working as the Ambassador of Palestine to France, Shahid arranged for the safe storage of artefacts that had been discovered during archaeological investigations in Gaza at sites such as Tell es-Sakan; they had been on display at the Institut du Monde Arabe for an exhibition on Gaza's history, but could not be returned after the end of the exhibition due to the start of the Second Intifada.

In 2004, Shahid was with Palestinian leader Yasser Arafat during his final days.

She was a longtime director of La revue d'études palestiniennes, serving as a board member until her death.

The Russell Tribunal on Palestine was established in March 2009 in response to a call by Shahid, British politician and chairperson of the Bertrand Russell Peace Foundation Ken Coates, and Israeli activist Nurit Peled-Elhanan.

== Private life ==
Though not a follower of the Baháʼí Faith, Shahid was the great-great-granddaughter of the Baháʼí prophet Baha'u'llah through her father, who was a grandson of Abdu'l-Baha. Her father was excommunicated from the Baháʼí Faith for his opposition to Shoghi Effendi, the Guardian of the Baháʼí Faith from 1922 to 1957.

Shahid died by suicide in France on 18 February 2026, at the age of 76. She had reportedly been ill for several years.
