= Auguste Forel =

Swiss myrmecologist, neuroanatomist and psychiatrist (1848–1931)

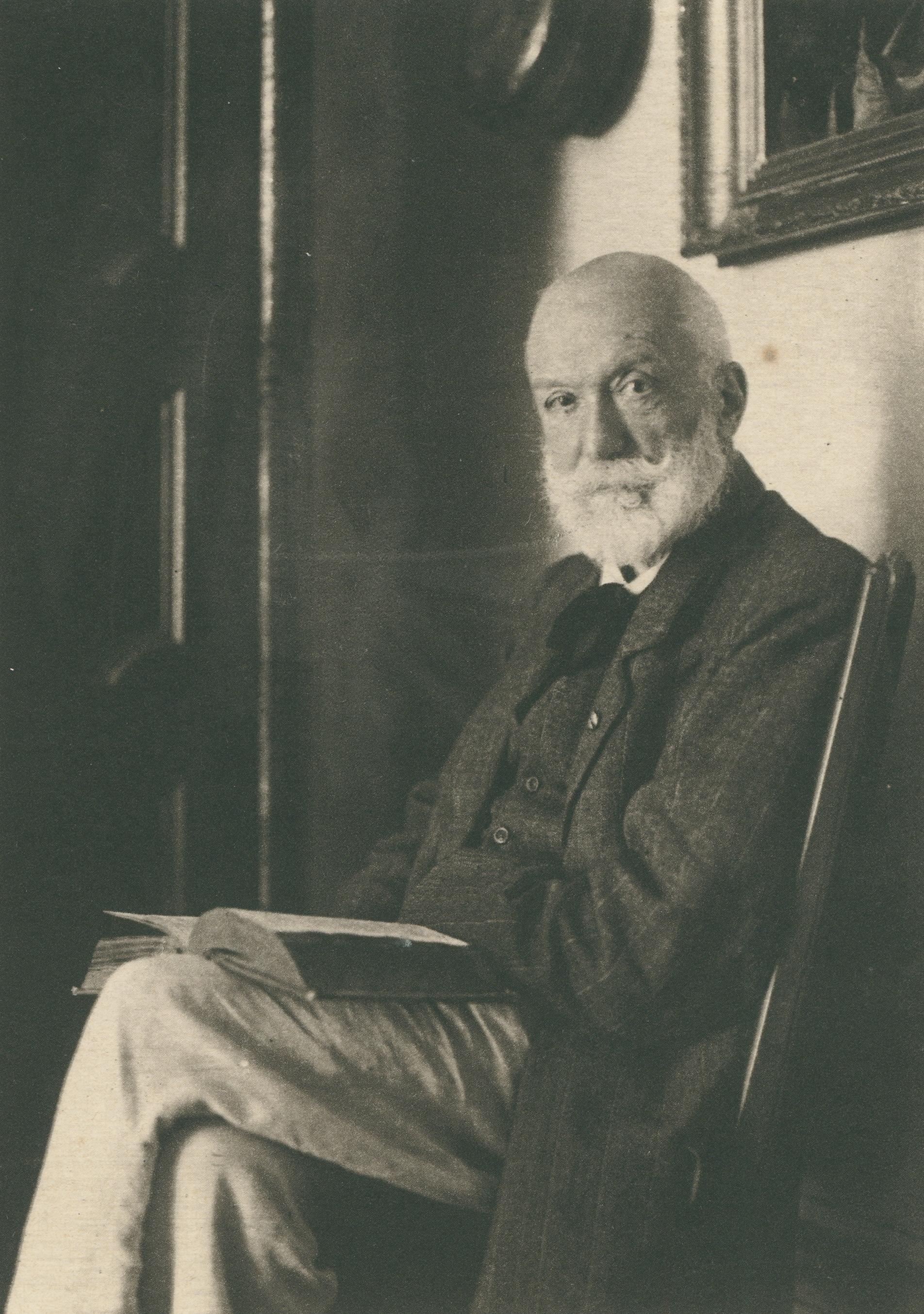
- Forel c. 1900
- Born: 1 September 1848; Morges, Switzerland
- Died: 27 July 1931 (aged 82); Yvorne, Switzerland
- Education: University of Zurich 1866–;
- Known for: Contributions to sexology and myrmecology
- Scientific career
- Fields: Myrmecology; Neuroanatomist; Psychiatrist

Signature
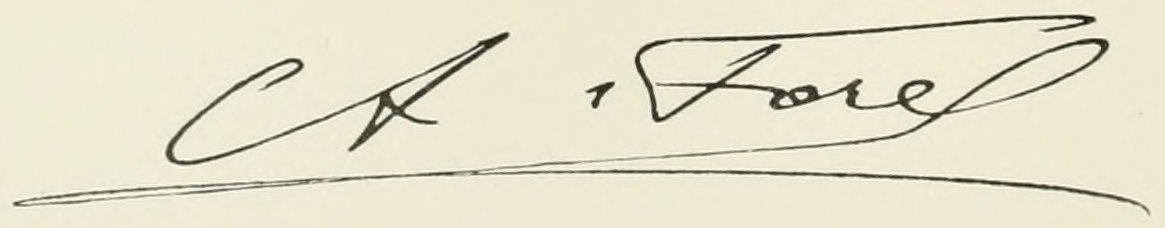

Auguste-Henri Forel (French pronunciation: [oɡyst ɑ̃ʁi fɔʁɛl]; 1 September 1848 – 27 July 1931) was a Swiss myrmecologist, neuroanatomist, psychiatrist and former eugenicist, notable for his investigations into the structure of the human brain and that of ants. He is considered a co-founder of the neuron theory. Forel is also known for his early contributions to sexology and psychology. From 1978 until 2000 Forel's image appeared on the 1000 Swiss franc banknote.

== Early life ==
Born in 1848 in a villa La Gracieuse, at Morges, on Lake Geneva, Switzerland, to Victor Forel (1823–1914) a pious Swiss Calvinist and Pauline Morin (1828–1890), a French Huguenot he was brought up in a protective household.

Auguste Forel was born in 1848 at Morges on Lake Geneva in Switzerland. His great uncle, who was an entomologist, introduced Forel to insect natural history when he was young. After reading a book by Pierre Huber, he became interested in ants.

== Education ==
He went to school at Morges and Lausanne. In 1866 he began his studies at the University of Zurich's medical school. While at medical school he continued to collect colonies of ants in order to study their physiology, biology, anatomy, systematic and even posology, as he experimented with the effect of some biochemical agents on them.

In 1871, he went to Vienna and studied under Theodor Meynert (1833-1892), where he did his first comparative study of the thalamus. Forel was disappointed by Meynert.

In Zurich, he was inspired by the work of Bernhard von Gudden (1824-1886). In 1873 he moved to Germany to assist Gudden at his Munich Kreis-Irrenanstalt. He improved upon various techniques in neuro-anatomy including modifications to Gudden's microtome design.

== Neuroscience ==
Forel had a diverse and mixed career as a thinker on many subjects.

In Zurich, he was inspired by the work of Bernhard von Gudden (1824-1886). In 1873 he moved to Germany to assist Gudden at his Munich Kreis-Irrenanstalt. He improved upon various techniques in neuro-anatomy including modifications to Gudden's microtome design.

In 1877, he described the nuclear and fibrillar organization of the tegmental region which is now known as Campus Foreli. He then became a lecturer at the Ludwig-Maximilians-Universität München while also continuing his research on ants.

=== Neuron theory ===
Forel realized from experiments that neurons were the basic elements of the nervous system. He found that the neuromuscular junction communicated by mere contact and did not require the anastomosis of fibres. This came to be called the Contact Theory of Forel.

The word "neuron" was coined by Wilhelm von Waldeyer who published a review of the work of Forel and others in 1891. Waldeyer synthesized ideas without actually conducting any research himself and published it in Deutsche medizinische Wochenschrift a widely read journal which made him popular. Forel was very bitter about Waldeyer's achievement of fame that it is thought to have contributed to the decline in his interest in neuroanatomy and neurology.

Forel first described in 1877 the zona incerta area in the brain. He gave it this name as it a "region of which nothing certain can be said".

In 1879, he accepted an appointment as professor of psychiatry at University of Zurich Medical School. He was also assigned to the position of temporary director of the Psychiatric University Hospital Zürich asylum—the Burghölzli asylum, where he worked with only two other physicians treating 300 patients. He remained there for nineteen years, publishing papers on insanity, prison reform, and social morality. Burghölzli was very poorly run with corrupt staff and poor standards before Forel took over and converted to be among the best in Europe.

== Myrmecology ==
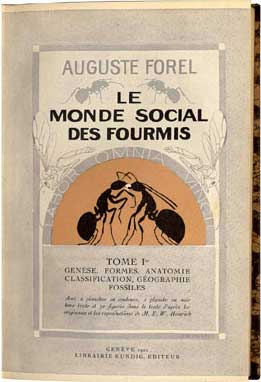
The Social World of Ants

=== Publications ===
==== Les fourmis de la Suisse (1874) ====
Following a field trip to southern Switzerland in his early twenties, Forel wrote a 450-page essay, Les Fourmis de la Suisse, which was first published in a three part series in a Swiss scientific journal, beginning in 1874. It earned him the Schafli prize awarded by the Swiss Natural History Society. Forel sent Charles Darwin a copy of the essay when it was published as a book in 1874, and Darwin commended his work. The Paris Academy of Science also honored him with the Thore prize for the essay. His 1874 450-page treatise, was selected by scholars for its cultural importance—it is part of the knowledge base of civilization. It was translated into English when it was reissued in 1890.

Sir J.A. Hammerton wrote a chapter entitled "The Senses of Insects: Auguste Forel", in his 1937 book, Outline of Great Books in which he praised Forel's 1874 "prize essay on the Ants of Switzerland". Hammerton said that it was "the most important contribution to insect psychology ever made by a single student...He made the senses and mental faculties of insects his chief study. His work on insects has served the study of human psychology, and is in itself perhaps the most important contribution to insect psychology ever made by a single student."

==== The Senses of Insects 1885 (1908) ====
In an experiment to better understand ant communication, in 1886, Forel removed the antennas of a large number of ants of different species, then placed them in a box in order to observe their behaviour. He found that the ants without antennae were no longer aggressive towards other ants, in marked contrast to ants with antennae. This confirmed his thesis that ants use their antennas to distinguish friend from foe. He published his findings in English in 1908 in The Senses of Insects. In a 2016 study described in the Smithsonian Magazine, the author cited Forel. The experiment was one of a series undertaken in the 1880s and published in German at that time. The 1908 English translation included several previously published studies on the subject.

==== Le Monde Social des Fourmis (1921) ====
In 1919, Forel hired the well-known animal painter Erich W. Heinrich to work with him on his five volume myrmecological magnum opus treatise, Le Monde social des fourmis du Globe comparé à celui de L'homme. The five volumes were published in French in 1921. It was published in English in 1928.

In his 1924 Nature review of Forel's Le Monde social des fourmis, compareé à celui de l'homme in Nature, Malinowski said taking the analogy between society and organism literally by comparing human society to that of animals, "has misled and wrecked most of the earlier attempts at systematic sociology." He said that comparisons between "relations between human individuals in society" and that of other living organism" has limited value—[a]s a method of sociological research and exposition this simile is worse than useless."

In 1914, Forel was a good friend of the well-known British entomologist Horace Donisthorpe, with whom he stayed in Switzerland; his ardent socialist views frequently caused political arguments between the two. In Horace Donisthorpe's 1927 edition of British Ants: their life history and classification. Donisthorpe said, "I should wish ... to protest against the ants being employed as a supposed weapon in political controversy. In my opinion an entomological work is not the appropriate means for the introduction of political theories of any kind, still less for their glaring advertisement."

=== Other myrmecological research ===
In 1898, Forel was credited with discovering trophallaxis among ants.

== Legacy ==
A travelling exhibition of Forel's lifework—August Forel: Arzt Naturforscher Sozialreformer—was shown in 1986 in Zürich, and two years later, in Bern. The founder of the Institute of Brain Research in Zürich, Konrad Akert, described Forel as a "role model" and his contributions as a "social reformer" and scientist, "monumental". In his 2008 History of Psychiatry journal article citing the 1980s exhibitions, Zurich-based psychiatrist, Bernhard Kuechenhoff, said that from the perspective of the twenty first century, Akert's "judgement would have to be modified." According to Kuechenhoff, these exhibitions did not adequately reflect a "complete representation" of Forel's life because they ignored and failed to mention "Forel's "[latent] racist and eugenic thoughts and ideas" and his related social activism. Kuechenhoff said that while he sought to draw attention to Forel's views on these topics, he cautioned against the "risk of a biased judgement.

From 1978 until 2000 Forel's image appeared on the 1000 Swiss franc banknote.

Forel International School is named after him.

== Personal life ==
Forel named his home as La Fourmilière—the Ant Colony. Around 1900 Forel was a eugenicist. Forel suffered a stroke that paralyzed his right side in 1912, but he taught himself to write with his left hand and was able to continue his studies. After hearing of the religion from his son in law Dr. Arthur Brauns (married to his daughter Martha), in 1920 he became a member of the Baháʼí Faith, abandoning his former racist and socialist views, writing in his will and testament:

This is the true religion of human social good, without dogmas or priests, uniting all men on this small terrestrial globe of ours. I have become a Baháʼí. May this religion live and prosper for the good of mankind; this is my most ardent wish.

— Auguste Forel,

In 1922 he started a Baháʼí group in Lausanne expounding his own agnostic and leftist ideas in addition to defending the Faith. He received a letter from ʻAbdu'l-Bahá known as the Tablet to Dr. Auguste Forel expounding on the differences between the mineral, vegetable, animal and human worlds, the spiritual nature of man and proofs of the existence of God.

Forel married Emma Steinheil in August 1883 and they had four daughters and two sons. In 1903 Forel and his family moved to live in his home, La Fourmiliere, in Yvorne near Lake Geneva. He died there on July 27, 1931, and was cremated in Lausanne two days later.

== Partial bibliography ==
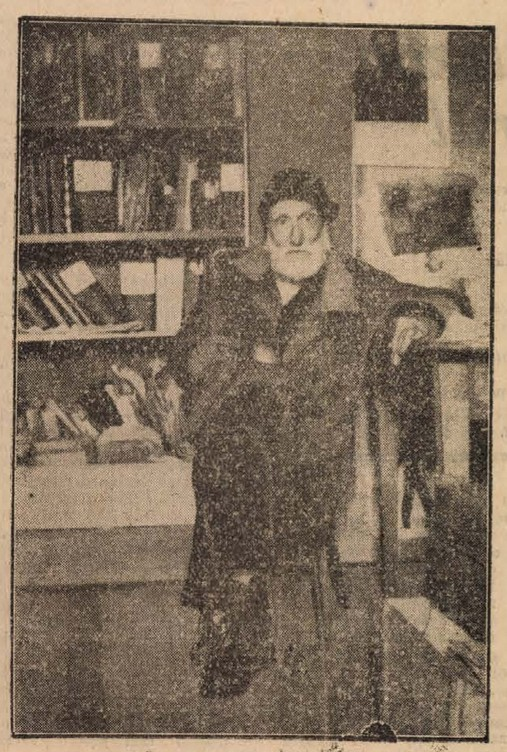
The last photo about Auguste Forel (published: July 1931)

- Ants and Some Other Insects: An Inquiry into the Psychic Powers of these Animals (1904)
- Hypnotism; or, Suggestion and Psychotherapy: A Study of the Psychological, Psycho-physiological and Therapeutic Aspects of Hypnotism (1907)
- Ameisen aus Sumatra, Java, Malacca und Ceylon. Gesammelt V.Prof. Dr. V. Buttel Reepen in den Jahren, 1911–1912. Zool. Jahrd.Jena Abt. F.Syst. 36: 1–148. (1913).
- Fourmis de Rhodesia, etc. recoltees par M. Arnold, le Dr. H. Brauns et K. Fikendey. Annales de la Societe Entomologique de Belgique. 57: 108–147.(1913).
- Le monde social des fourmis du globe comparé à celui de l'homme. Genève, Kundig, 1921–1923, 5 volumes (1921-1923).
