= Munib Shahid =

Palestinian hematologist (1908–1973)

- منيب شهيد
- Born: 1908; Acre, Palestine
- Died: 1973 (aged 64–65)
- Other names: M. Shahid, M J Shahid
- Occupation: Hematologist

Munib Jalal Shahid (Arabic: منيب جلال شهيد, romanized: Munīb Jalāl Shahīd; 1908–1973) was Chairman of Hematology and Oncology at the Faculty of Medicine of the American University of Beirut. He built the hematology laboratory at the Faculty of Medicine, a development that increased research output significantly. The Dr. Munib Shahid Award is presented annually at the American University of Beirut to the fourth year medical student demonstrating the best performance in internal medicine and a mature character.

Munib Shahid was born in 1908 in Acre, Palestine to a prominent Baháʼí lineage. He was the great-grandson of Baháʼu'lláh, the founder-prophet of the Baháʼí Faith. His parents were Jalal, an Afnán, and Rúḥá, a daughter of ʻAbdu'l-Bahá. His paternal grandfather was Muhammad-Hasan, titled "King of the Martyrs". In 1944, he married Serene Husseini according to the Muslim rites. She was related to the Grand Mufti of Jerusalem, an enemy of the Baháʼís. Shoghi Effendi, Munib's cousin and then head of the Baháʼí Faith, labeled this marriage a "treacherous act" and excommunicated Munib Shahid as a Covenant-breaker.

Munib and Serene Husseini continued to live in Beirut, where he pursued his academic career, and she promoted cottage industries among Palestinian refugees. Serene Shahid wrote a critically acclaimed autobiography of her childhood, titled, Jerusalem Memories. The couple had three daughters, including Leila Shahid.

== Selected publications ==
Among Shahid's publications were:

- (with H.A. Yenikomshian) "Typhoid Fever in Inocculated and Noninocculated Persons," Journe'es Medicales Libanais de Beyrouth (May 1938) 241–247.
- "The Use of Nitrogen Mustard in Neoplastic Diseases of the Bone Marrow," Rev. Med. Liban. I (1961?): 45–51.
- (with E. Stephan) "Perarterite noueuse-Maladie de Kussmaul." Rev. Med. Moy. Or. VI (1949): 295–303.
- "ACTH et cortisone en hematologie." Rev. Med. Moy. Or. XI (1954): 279–291.
- "Quelques considerations sur le favisme au Liban." Rev. Med. Moy. Or. (1960): 83–86.
- (with N.A. Abu-Haydar) "Sickle Cell Disease in Lebanon and Syria." Acta Haemat., Basel XXVII (1962):268-273.
- (with G.I. Abu-Haydar and N.A. Abu-Haydar) "Thalassemia Hemoglobin E. Disease. A Case Report from Quatar." Persian Gulf, Man., CLV (1963):129.
- "Hemoglobinopathies in Lebanon and Arab Countries." Proc. IXth Congr. European Soc. Haemat., II (1963):496-500.
- "Iron Absorption in Thalassemia." Abstr. IXth Congr. Int. Soc. Haemat. (Stockholm, 1964.)
