= ʻAbdu'l-Bahá =

Head of the Baháʼí Faith from 1892 to 1921

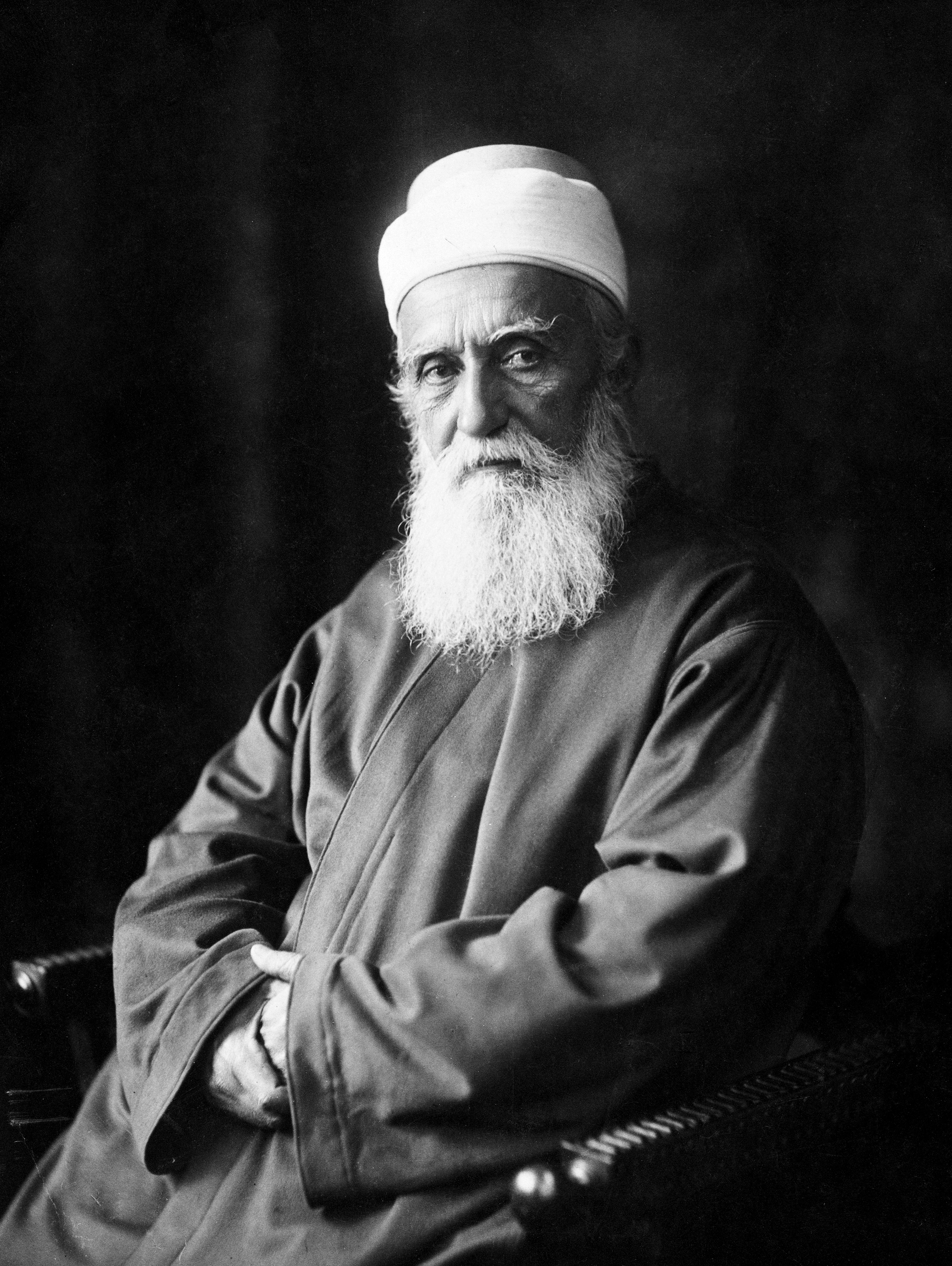
- ʻAbdu'l-Bahá in c. 1912
- Title: Centre of the Covenant

Personal life
- Born: ʻAbbás; 23 May 1844 Tehran, Persia
- Died: 28 November 1921 (aged 77) Haifa, Mandatory Palestine
- Resting place: Currently the Shrine of the Báb, to be relocated to the Shrine of ʻAbdu'l-Bahá; 32°48′52.59″N 34°59′14.17″E
- Spouse: Munírih Khánum (m. 1873)
- Children: Ḍíyáʼíyyih K͟hánum; Túbá K͟hánum; Rúḥá K͟hánum; Munavvar K͟hánum
- Parents: Baháʼu'lláh (father); Ásíyih Khánum (mother)
- Relatives: Shoghi Effendi (grandson)

Religious life
- Religion: Baháʼí Faith

Senior posting
- Predecessor: Baháʼu'lláh
- Successor: Shoghi Effendi

ʻAbdu'l-Bahá (/əbˈdʊl bəˈhɑː/; Persian: عبد البهاء, IPA: [ʔæbdolbæhɒːʔ];, 23 May 1844 – 28 November 1921), born ʻAbbás (Persian: عباس, IPA: [ʔæbːɒːs]), was the eldest son of Baháʼu'lláh, founder of the Bahá’í Faith, who designated him to be his successor and head of the Baháʼí Faith from 1892 until 1921. ʻAbdu'l-Bahá was later cited as the last of three "central figures" of the religion, along with Baháʼu'lláh and the Báb, and his writings and authenticated talks are regarded as sources of Baháʼí sacred literature.

He was born in Tehran to an aristocratic family. At the age of eight, his father was imprisoned during a government crackdown on the Bábí Faith and the family's possessions were looted, leaving them in virtual poverty. His father was exiled from their native Iran, and the family established their residence in Baghdad in Iraq, where they stayed for ten years. They were later called by the Ottoman state to Istanbul before entering another period of confinement in Edirne and finally the prison-city of ʻAkká (Acre). ʻAbdu'l-Bahá remained a prisoner there until the Young Turk Revolution freed him in 1908 at the age of 64. He then made several journeys to the West to spread the Baháʼí message beyond its middle-eastern roots, but the onset of World War I left him largely confined to Haifa from 1914 to 1918. Following the war, the openly hostile Ottoman authorities were replaced by the British Mandate over Palestine, during which time he was appointed a Knight Commander of the Order of the British Empire for his help in averting famine following the war.

In 1892, ʻAbdu'l-Bahá was appointed in his father's will to be his successor and head of the Baháʼí Faith. His Tablets of the Divine Plan galvanized Baháʼís in North America to spread the Baháʼí teachings to new territories, and his Will and Testament laid the foundation for the current Baháʼí administrative order. Many of his writings, prayers and letters are extant, and his discourses with the Western Baháʼís emphasize the growth of the religion by the late 1890s.

ʻAbdu'l-Bahá's given name was ʻAbbás. Depending on context, he would have gone by either Mírzá ʻAbbás (Persian) or ʻAbbás Effendi (Turkish), both of which are equivalent to the English Sir ʻAbbás. During most of his time as head of the Baháʼí Faith, he used and preferred the title of ʻAbdu'l-Bahá ("servant of Bahá", a reference to his father). He is commonly referred to in Baháʼí texts as "The Master".

== Early life ==
ʻAbdu'l-Bahá was born in Tehran, Persia (now Iran) on 23 May 1844 (5th of Jamadiyu'l-Avval, 1260 AH), the eldest son of Baháʼu'lláh and Navváb. He was born on the same night on which the Báb declared his mission. Given the name ʻAbbás at birth, he was named after his grandfather Mírzá ʻAbbás Núrí, a prominent and powerful nobleman. ʻAbdu'l-Bahá's early years were shaped by his father's prominent role within the Bábí community. As a child, he fondly recalled interactions with the Bábí, Táhirih, describing how she would take him on her knee, caress him, and engage in heartfelt conversations, leaving a lasting impression on him. His childhood was characterized by happiness and carefree moments. The family's residences in Tehran and the countryside were not only comfortable but also beautifully adorned. Alongside his younger siblings – a sister, Bahíyyih, and a brother, Mihdí – he experienced a life of privilege, joy, and comfort. ʻAbdu'l-Bahá loved playing in the gardens with his younger sister, fostering a strong bond between them. During his formative years, ʻAbdu'l-Bahá observed his parents' commitment to various charitable endeavors, including the conversion of part of their home into a hospital ward for women and children.

Due to a life largely marked by exile and imprisonment, ʻAbdu'l-Bahá had limited opportunities for formal schooling. In his youth, it was customary for children of nobility, including ʻAbdu'l-Bahá, not to attend conventional schools. Instead, noblemen typically received a brief education at home, focusing on subjects such as scripture, rhetoric, calligraphy, and basic mathematics, with an emphasis on preparing for life within royal courts.

ʻAbdu'l-Bahá spent only a short period at a traditional preparatory school at the age of seven for a single year. His mother and uncle took on the responsibility of his early education, but the primary source of his learning was his father. In 1890 Edward Granville Browne described ʻAbdu'l-Bahá, saying that "one more eloquent of speech, more ready of argument, more apt of illustration, more intimately acquainted with the sacred books of the Jews, the Christians, and the Muhammadans...could scarcely be found..."

According to contemporary accounts ʻAbdu'l-Bahá was an eloquent and charming child. At the age of seven, he faced a severe health challenge when he contracted tuberculosis, and his prognosis suggested death. Though the illness abated, this marked the beginning of a lifelong struggle with recurrent bouts of various illnesses that would persist throughout his life.

One event that affected ʻAbdu'l-Bahá greatly during his childhood was the imprisonment of his father when ʻAbdu'l-Bahá was eight years old; this circumstance led to a considerable decline in the family's economic standing, subjecting him to poverty and exposing him to hostility from other children in the streets. ʻAbdu'l-Bahá accompanied his mother to visit Baháʼu'lláh who was then imprisoned in the infamous subterranean dungeon the Síyáh-Chál. He described how "I saw a dark, steep place. We entered a small, narrow doorway, and went down two steps, but beyond those one could see nothing. In the middle of the stairway, all of a sudden we heard His [Baháʼu'lláh's]…voice: 'Do not bring him in here', and so they took me back".

== Baghdad ==
Baháʼu'lláh was eventually released from prison but was ordered into exile, and ʻAbdu'l-Bahá, then eight years old, joined his father on the journey to Baghdad in the winter (January to April) of 1853. During the journey ʻAbdu'l-Bahá suffered from frost-bite. After a year of difficulties, Baháʼu'lláh absented himself rather than continuing to face the conflict with Mirza Yahya and secluded himself in the mountains of Sulaymaniyah in April 1854, a month before ʻAbdu'l-Bahá's tenth birthday Due to mutual sorrow, ʻAbdu'l-Bahá, his mother and sister becoming constant companions. ʻAbdu'l-Bahá was particularly close to both, and his mother took an active role in his education and upbringing. During the two-year absence of his father ʻAbdu'l-Bahá took up the duty of managing the affairs of the family, before his age of maturity (14 in Middle-Eastern society) and was known to be occupied with reading and, at a time of hand-copied scriptures being the primary means of publishing, was also engaged in copying the writings of the Báb. ʻAbdu'l-Bahá also took an interest in the art of horseback riding, and as he grew, he became a renowned rider.

In 1856, news of an ascetic engaging in discourses with local Súfí leaders reached family and friends, raising hopes that it could be Baháʼu'lláh. Immediately, they went to search for Baháʼu'lláh, and in March, brought him back to Baghdad. On seeing his father, ʻAbdu'l-Bahá fell to his knees and wept loudly "Why did you leave us?", and his mother and sister did the same. ʻAbdu'l-Bahá soon became his father's secretary and shield. During the sojourn in the city ʻAbdu'l-Bahá grew from a boy into a young man. He was noted as a "remarkably fine looking youth", and remembered for his charity. Having passed the age of maturity, ʻAbdu'l-Bahá was regularly seen in the mosques of Baghdad discussing religious topics and the scripture as a young man. Whilst in Baghdad, ʻAbdu'l-Bahá composed a commentary at the request of his father on the Muslim tradition of "I was a Hidden Treasure" for a Súfí leader named ʻAlí Shawkat Páshá. ʻAbdu'l-Bahá was fifteen or sixteen at the time and ʻAlí Shawkat Páshá regarded the more than 11,000-word essay as a remarkable feat for someone of his age. In 1863, in what became known as the Garden of Ridván, his father Baháʼu'lláh announced to a few companions that he was the manifestation of God and He whom God shall make manifest whose coming had been foretold by the Báb. On day eight of the twelve days, it is reported that ʻAbdu'l-Bahá was the first person to whom Baháʼu'lláh revealed his claim.

== Istanbul/Adrianople ==
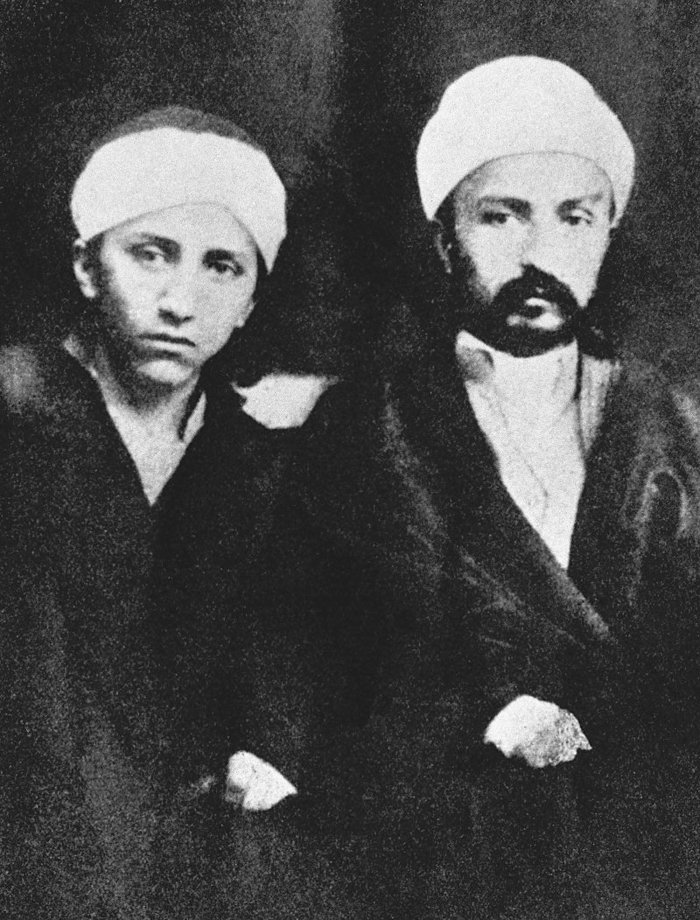
ʻAbdu'l-Bahá (right) with his brother Mírzá Mihdí

In 1863, Baháʼu'lláh was summoned to Istanbul, and thus his family, including ʻAbdu'l-Bahá, then eighteen, accompanied him on his 110-day journey. The journey to Constantinople was another wearisome voyage, and ʻAbdu'l-Bahá helped feed the exiles. It was here that his position became more prominent amongst the Baháʼís. This was further solidified by Baháʼu'lláh's tablet of the Branch in which he constantly exalts his son's virtues and station. Bahá’u’lláh and his family were soon exiled to Adrianople, and on this journey ʻAbdu'l-Bahá again suffered from frostbite.

In Adrianople ʻAbdu'l-Bahá was regarded as the sole comforter of his family – in particular to his mother. At this point ʻAbdu'l-Bahá was known by the Baháʼís as "the Master", and by non-Baháʼís as ʻAbbás Effendi ("Effendi" signifies "Sir"). It was in Adrianople that Baháʼu'lláh referred to his son as "the Mystery of God". The title of "Mystery of God" symbolises, according to Baháʼís, that ʻAbdu'l-Bahá is not a manifestation of God but that in the "person of ʻAbdu'l-Bahá the incompatible characteristics of a human nature and superhuman knowledge and perfection have been blended and are completely harmonized". Baháʼu'lláh gave his son many other titles such as G͟husn-i-Aʻzam (meaning "Mightiest Branch" or "Mightier Branch"), (Note: The elative is a stage of gradation in Arabic that can be used both for a superlative or a comparative. G͟husn-i-Aʻzam could mean "Mightiest Branch" or "Mightier Branch") the "Branch of Holiness", "the Center of the Covenant" and the apple of his eye. Upon learning of yet another exile of Bahá’u’llah, this time to Palestine, ʻAbdu'l-Bahá ("the Master") was devastated when hearing the news that he and his family were to be exiled separately from Baháʼu'lláh. It was, according to Baháʼís, through his intercession that the idea was reverted and the rest of the family were allowed to be exiled together.

== ʻAkká ==
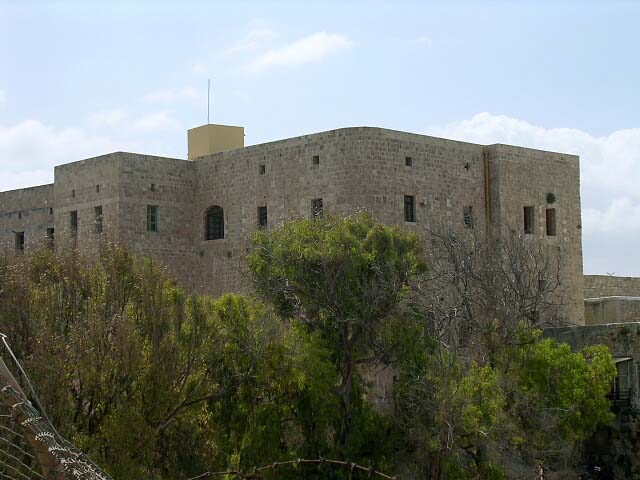
Prison in ʻAkká where Baháʼu'lláh and his family were housed

At the age of 24, ʻAbdu'l-Bahá was clearly chief-steward to his father and an outstanding member of the Baháʼí community. In 1868 Baháʼu'lláh and his family were exiled to the penal colony of ʻAkká, Palestine where it was expected that the family would perish. Arrival in ʻAkká was distressing for the family and exiles when they were met by a hostile local population. When told that the women were to sit on the shoulders of the men to reach the shore, ʻAbdu'l-Bahá obtained chairs to carry the women to land. His sister and father fell dangerously ill. ʻAbdu'l-Bahá was able to procure some anesthetic and nursed the sick. The Baháʼís were imprisoned under horrendous conditions in a cluster of cells covered in excrement and dirt. ʻAbdu'l-Bahá himself fell dangerously ill with dysentery, and a sympathetic soldier permitted a physician to attend to him. The population shunned them, the soldiers treated them badly, and the behaviour of Siyyid Muhammad-i-Isfahani (an Azali) aggravated matters. Morale declined further with the accidental death of ʻAbdu'l-Bahá's youngest brother Mírzá Mihdí at the age of 22. The grieving ʻAbdu'l-Bahá kept a night-long vigil beside his brother's body.

=== Later in ʻAkká ===
Over time, he gradually assumed responsibility for the relationships between the small Baháʼí exile community and the outside world. It was through his interaction with the people of ʻAkká (Acre) that, they recognized the innocence of the Baháʼís, and thus the conditions of imprisonment were eased. Four months after the death of Mihdí the family moved from the prison to the House of ʻAbbúd. Gradually the respect of the local population for the Baháʼís increased, and in particular, for ʻAbdu'l-Bahá who soon became very popular in the penal colony. Myron Henry Phelps a wealthy New York lawyer described how "a crowd of human beings...Syrians, Arabs, Ethiopians, and many others", all waited to talk and receive ʻAbdu'l-Bahá. With the passage of time ʻAbdu'l-Bahá was able to rent alternative accommodations for the family, and eventually the family moved to the Mansion of Bahjí around 1879 when an epidemic caused its residents to flee.

ʻAbdu'l-Bahá undertook a history of the Bábí religion through publication of A Traveller's Narrative (Makála-i-Shakhsí Sayyáh) in 1886, later translated and published in translation in 1891 through Cambridge University through the agency of Edward Granville Browne.

=== Marriage and family life ===
When ʻAbdu'l-Bahá was a young man, speculation was rife amongst the Baháʼís as to whom he would marry. Several young girls were seen as marriage prospects but ʻAbdu'l-Bahá seemed disinclined to marriage. On 8 March 1873, at the urging of his father, the twenty-eight-year-old ʻAbdu'l-Bahá married Fátimih Nahrí of Isfahán (1847–1938) a twenty-five-year-old from an upper-class family of the city. Her father was Mírzá Muḥammad ʻAlí Nahrí of Isfahan, an eminent Baháʼí with prominent connections. (Note: The Nahrí family had earned their fortune from a successful trading business. They won the favor of the leading ecclesiastics and nobility of Isfahan and had business transactions with royalty.) Fátimih was brought from Persia to ʻAkká after both Baháʼu'lláh and his wife Navváb expressed an interest that she marries ʻAbdu'l-Bahá. After a wearisome journey from Isfahán to Akka she finally arrived accompanied by her brother in 1872. The young couple were betrothed for about five months before the marriage itself commenced. In the meantime, Fátimih lived in the home of ʻAbdu'l-Bahá's uncle Mírzá Músá. According to her later memoirs, Fátimih fell in love with ʻAbdu'l-Bahá on seeing him. ʻAbdu'l-Bahá himself had shown little inkling to marriage until meeting Fátimih; who was entitled Munírih by Baháʼu'lláh. Munírih is a title meaning "Luminous".

The marriage resulted in nine children. The first born was a son Mihdí Effendi who died aged about 3. He was followed by Ḍíyáʼíyyih K͟hánum, Fuʼádíyyih K͟hánum (who dies very young), Rúhangíz Khánum (d. 1893), Túbá Khánum, Husayn Effendi (d. 1887 aged 5), Túbá K͟hánum, Rúhá K͟hánum (mother of Munib Shahid), and Munnavar K͟hánum. The death of his children caused ʻAbdu'l-Bahá immense grief – in particular the death of his son Husayn Effendi came at a difficult time following the death of his mother and uncle. The surviving children (all daughters) were; Ḍíyáʼíyyih K͟hánum (mother of Shoghi Effendi) (d. 1951) Túbá K͟hánum (1880–1959) Rúḥá K͟hánum and Munavvar K͟hánum (d. 1971). Baháʼu'lláh wished that the Baháʼís follow the example of ʻAbdu'l-Bahá and gradually move away from polygamy. The marriage of ʻAbdu'l-Bahá to one woman and his choice to remain monogamous, from advice of his father and his own wish, legitimised the practice of monogamy to a people who hitherto had regarded polygamy as a righteous way of life.

== Early years of his ministry ==
After Baháʼu'lláh died on 29 May 1892, the Book of the Covenant of Baháʼu'lláh (his will) named ʻAbdu'l-Bahá as Centre of the Covenant, successor and interpreter of Baháʼu'lláh's writings. (Note: In the Kitáb-i-ʻAhd Baháʼu'lláh refers to his eldest son ʻAbdu'l-Bahá as G͟husn-i-Aʻzam (meaning "Mightiest Branch" or "Mightier Branch") and his second eldest son Mírzá Muhammad ʻAlí as G͟husn-i-Akbar (meaning "Greatest Branch" or "Greater Branch").)

Baháʼu'lláh designates his successor with the following verses:

The Will of the divine Testator is this: It is incumbent upon the Aghsán, the Afnán and My Kindred to turn, one and all, their faces towards the Most Mighty Branch. Consider that which We have revealed in Our Most Holy Book: 'When the ocean of My presence hath ebbed and the Book of My Revelation is ended, turn your faces toward Him Whom God hath purposed, Who hath branched from this Ancient Root.' The object of this sacred verse is none other except the Most Mighty Branch [ʻAbdu'l-Bahá]. Thus have We graciously revealed unto you Our potent Will, and I am verily the Gracious, the All-Powerful. Verily God hath ordained the station of the Greater Branch [Muḥammad ʻAlí] to be beneath that of the Most Great Branch [ʻAbdu'l-Bahá]. He is in truth the Ordainer, the All-Wise. We have chosen 'the Greater' after 'the Most Great', as decreed by Him Who is the All-Knowing, the All-Informed.

— Baháʼu'lláh (1873–1892)

In Baháʼu'lláh's will, ʻAbdu'l-Bahá's half-brother, Muhammad ʻAlí, was mentioned by name as being subordinate to ʻAbdu'l-Bahá. Muhammad ʻAlí became jealous of ‘Abdu’l-Bahá and set out to establish authority for himself as an alternative leader with the support of his brothers Badi’u'llah and Ḍíyáʼu'llah. He began correspondence with Baháʼís in Iran, initially in secret, casting doubts in others' minds about ʻAbdu'l-Bahá. While most Baháʼís followed ʻAbdu'l-Bahá, a handful followed Muhammad ʻAlí including such prominent Bahá’ís as Mirza Javad and Ibrahim George Kheiralla, an early Baháʼí missionary to America.

Muhammad ʻAlí and Mirza Javad began to openly accuse ʻAbdu'l-Bahá of assuming too much authority, suggesting that he believed himself to be a Manifestation of God, equal in status to Baháʼu'lláh. It was at this time that ʻAbdu'l-Bahá, to counter the accusations leveled against him, stated in tablets to the West that he was to be known as "ʻAbdu'l-Bahá" an Arabic phrase meaning the Servant of Bahá to make it clear that he was not a Manifestation of God, and that his station was only servitude. ʻAbdu'l-Bahá left a Will and Testament that established the framework of the administration of the Baháʼí Faith, the two highest institutions of which were the Universal House of Justice, and the Guardianship, for which he appointed his grandson Shoghi Effendi as the Guardian. With the exception of ʻAbdu'l-Bahá and Shoghi Effendi, Muhammad ʻAlí was supported by all of the remaining male relatives of Baháʼu'lláh, including Shoghi Effendi's father, Mírzá Hádí Shírází. However, in general the Bahá’ís experienced very little effect from the propaganda of Muhammad ʻAlí and his allies; in the ʻAkká area, the followers of Muhammad ʻAlí represented six families at most, had no common religious activities, and were almost wholly assimilated into Muslim society.

Religions in the past faced schism and doctrinal drift after the death of their prophet founders. ʻAbdu'l-Bahá however managed to preserve the unity and doctrinal integrity of the Baháʼí Faith, even in the face of serious threats from his half-brother's opposition. His success is especially notable given that even in the midst of these attacks his leadership brought about considerable expansion of the Baháʼí community beyond its initial cultural and geographic roots.

=== First Western pilgrims ===
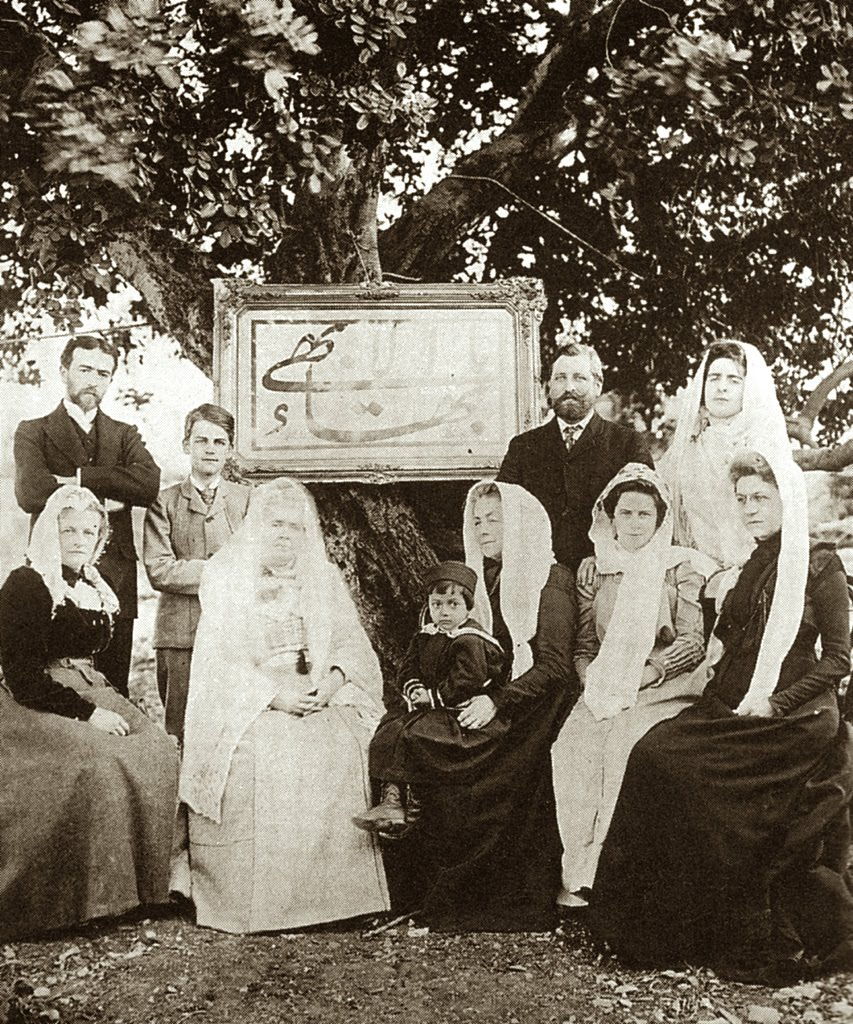
Early Western Baháʼí pilgrims. Standing left to right: Charles Mason Remey, Sigurd Russell, Edward Getsinger and Laura Clifford Barney; Seated left to right: Ethel Jenner Rosenberg, Madam Jackson, Shoghi Effendi, Helen Ellis Cole, Lua Getsinger, Emogene Hoagg

By the end of 1898, Western pilgrims started traveling to Akka on pilgrimage to visit ʻAbdu'l-Bahá; this group of pilgrims, including Phoebe Hearst, was the first time that Baháʼís raised up in the West had met ʻAbdu'l-Bahá. The first group arrived in 1898 and throughout late 1898 to early 1899 Western Baháʼís sporadically visited ʻAbdu'l-Bahá. The group was relatively young containing mainly women from high American society in their 20s. The group of Westerners aroused suspicion for the authorities, and consequently ʻAbdu'l-Bahá's confinement was tightened. During the next decade ʻAbdu'l-Bahá would be in constant communication with Baháʼís around the world, encouraging them to teach the religion; the group included Susan Moody, Lua Getsinger, Laura Clifford Barney, Herbert Hopper and May Ellis Bolles in Paris (all Americans); Englishman Thomas Breakwell; and Frenchman Hippolyte Dreyfus. It was Laura Clifford Barney who, by asking questions of ʻAbdu'l-Bahá over many years and many visits to Haifa, compiled what later became the book Some Answered Questions.

=== Ministry, 1901–1912 ===
During the final years of the 19th century, while ʻAbdu'l-Bahá was still officially a prisoner and confined to ʻAkka, he organized the transfer of the remains of the Báb from Iran to Palestine. He then organized the purchase of land on Mount Carmel that Baháʼu'lláh had instructed should be used to lay the remains of the Báb, and organized for the construction of the Shrine of the Báb. This process took another 10 years. With the increase of pilgrims visiting ʻAbdu'l-Bahá, Muhammad ʻAlí conspired with the Ottoman authorities to re-introduce stricter terms on ʻAbdu'l-Bahá's imprisonment in August 1901. By 1902, however, due to the support of the Governor of ʻAkka, the situation was greatly eased; while pilgrims were able to once again visit ʻAbdu'l-Bahá, he was still confined to the city. In February 1903, two followers of Muhammad ʻAlí, including Badiʻu'llah and Siyyid ʻAliy-i-Afnan, broke with Muhammad ʻAli and wrote books and letters giving details of Muhammad ʻAli's plots and noting that what was circulating about ʻAbdu'l-Bahá was fabrication.

From 1902 to 1904, even as ‘Abdu’l-Bahá directed the construction of the Shrine of the Báb, he initiated execution of two additional projects; the restoration of the House of the Báb in Shiraz, Iran and the construction of the first Baháʼí House of Worship in Ashgabat, Turkmenistan. ʻAbdu'l-Bahá asked Aqa Mirza Aqa to coordinate the restoration of the house of the Báb to its state at the time of the Báb's declaration to Mulla Husayn in 1844; he also entrusted the work on the House of Worship to Vakil-u'd-Dawlih.

In his role as head of the Bahá’í Faith, ‘Abdu’l-Bahá would occasionally communicate with leaders of thought to offer commentary and guidance based on the Bahá’í teachings, and in defense of the Bahá’í community. During this period, ʻAbdu'l-Bahá communicated with a number of Young Turks, who sought to reform to the reign of Sultan Abdul Hamid II, including Namık Kemal, Ziya Pasha and Midhat Pasha. He emphasized Baháʼís "seek freedom and love liberty, hope for equality, are well-wishers of humanity and ready to sacrifice their lives to unite humanity" but on a more broad approach than the Young Turks. Abdullah Cevdet, one of the founders of the Committee of Union and Progress who considered the Baháʼí Faith an intermediary step between Islam and the ultimate abandonment of religious belief, would go on trial for defense of Baháʼís in a periodical he founded.

‛Abdu'l-Bahá also had contact with military leaders, including such individuals as Bursalı Mehmet Tahir Bey and Hasan Bedreddin. The latter, who in an earlier period was involved in the overthrow of Sultan Abdülaziz in 1876, is commonly known as Bedri Paşa or Bedri Pasha and is referred to in Persian Baháʼí sources as Bedri Bey (Badri Beg). He probably came to know ʻAbdu'l-Bahá around 1898 when he served in the Ottoman administration in Akká. Persian sources cite him was a Baháʼí and he who translated ʻAbdu'l-Bahá's works into French. ‘Abdu’l-Bahá continued to communicate with him for several years when he was governor of Albania.

ʻAbdu'l-Bahá also met Muhammad Abduh, one of the key figures of Islamic Modernism and the Salafi movement, in Beirut, at a time when the two men shared similar goals of religious reform. Rashid Rida asserts that during his visits to Beirut, ʻAbdu'l-Bahá would attend Abduh's study sessions. Regarding the meetings of ʻAbdu'l-Bahá and Muhammad ʻAbduh, Shoghi Effendi asserts that "His several interviews with the well-known Shaykh Muhammad ʻAbdu served to enhance immensely the growing prestige of the community and spread abroad the fame of its most distinguished member."

Due to Muhammad ʻAli's accusations against him, a Commission of Inquiry interviewed ʻAbdu'l-Bahá in 1905, almost resulting in exile to Fezzan. In response, ʻAbdu'l-Bahá wrote the sultan a letter protesting that his followers refrain from involvement in partisan politics and that his tariqa had guided many Americans to Islam. The next few years in ʻAkka were relatively free of pressures and pilgrims were able to come and visit ʻAbdu'l-Bahá. By 1909 the mausoleum of the Shrine of the Báb was completed.

== Journeys to the West ==
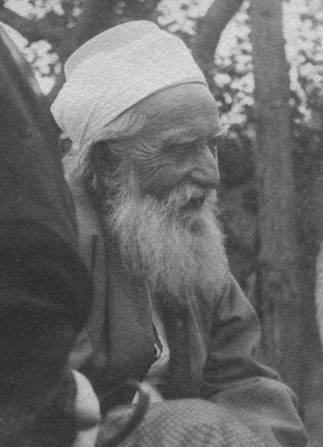
ʻAbdu'l-Bahá, during his trip to the United States

The 1908 Young Turks revolution liberated all political and religious prisoners in the Ottoman Empire, and ʻAbdu'l-Bahá was freed from imprisonment. His first action after his liberation was to visit the Shrine of Baháʼu'lláh in Bahji. While ʻAbdu'l-Bahá continued to live in ʻAkka immediately following the revolution, he soon moved to live in Haifa near the Shrine of the Báb. In 1910, with the freedom to leave the country, he embarked on a three-year journey to Egypt, Europe, and North America, spreading the Baháʼí message.

From August to December 1911, ʻAbdu'l-Bahá visited cities in Europe, including London, Bristol, and Paris. The purpose of these trips was to support the Baháʼí communities in the west and to further spread his father's teachings.

In the following year, he undertook a much more extensive journey to the United States and Canada to once again spread his father's teachings. He arrived in New York City on 11 April 1912, after declining an offer of passage on the RMS Titanic, telling the Baháʼí believers, instead, to "Donate this to charity." He instead travelled on a slower craft, the RMS Cedric, and cited preference of a longer sea journey as the reason. After hearing of the Titanic's sinking on 16 April he was quoted as saying "I was asked to sail upon the Titanic, but my heart did not prompt me to do so." While he spent most of his time in New York, he visited Chicago, Cleveland, Pittsburgh, Washington, D.C., Boston and Philadelphia. In August of the same year he started a more extensive journey to places including New Hampshire, the Green Acre school in Maine, and Montreal (his only visit to Canada). He then travelled west to Minneapolis, Minnesota; San Francisco; Stanford; and Los Angeles, California before returning east at the end of October. On 5 December 1912 he set sail back to Europe.

During his visit to North America he visited many missions, churches, and groups, as well as having scores of meetings in homes of Baháʼís, and offering innumerable personal meetings with hundreds of people. During his talks he proclaimed Baháʼí principles such as the unity of God, unity of the religions, oneness of humanity, equality of women and men, world peace and economic justice. He also insisted that all his meetings be open to all races.

His visit and talks were the subject of hundreds of newspaper articles. In Boston newspaper reporters asked ʻAbdu'l-Bahá why he had come to America, and he stated that he had come to participate in conferences on peace and that just giving warning messages is not enough. ʻAbdu'l-Bahá's visit to Montreal provided notable newspaper coverage; on the night of his arrival the editor of the Montreal Daily Star met with him and that newspaper along with The Montreal Gazette, Montreal Standard, Le Devoir and La Presse among others reported on ʻAbdu'l-Bahá's activities. The headlines in those papers included "Persian Teacher to Preach Peace", "Racialism Wrong, Says Eastern Sage, Strife and War Caused by Religious and National Prejudices", and "Apostle of Peace Meets Socialists, Abdul Baha's Novel Scheme for Distribution of Surplus Wealth." The Montreal Standard, which was distributed across Canada, took so much interest that it republished the articles a week later; the Gazette published six articles and Montreal's largest French language newspaper published two articles about him. His 1912 visit to Montreal also inspired humourist Stephen Leacock to parody him in his bestselling 1914 book Arcadian Adventures with the Idle Rich. In Chicago one newspaper headline included "His Holiness Visits Us, Not Pius X but A. Baha," and ʻAbdu'l-Bahá's visit to California was reported in the Palo Altan.

Back in Europe, he visited London, Edinburgh, Paris (where he stayed for two months), Stuttgart, Budapest, and Vienna. Finally, on 12 June 1913, he returned to Egypt, where he stayed for six months before returning to Haifa.

== Final years (1914–1921) ==
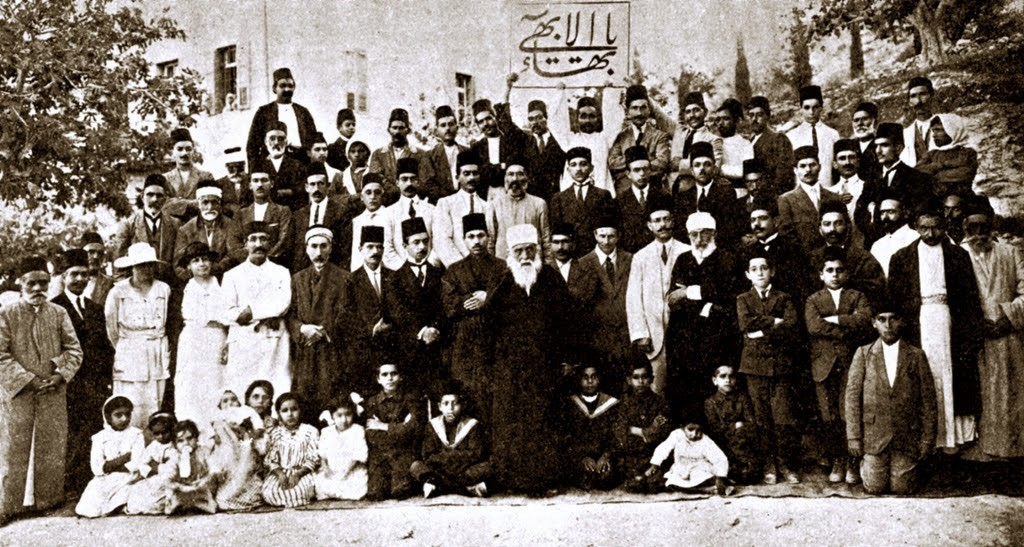
ʻAbdu'l-Bahá on Mount Carmel with pilgrims in 1919

During World War I (1914–1918) ʻAbdu'l-Bahá stayed in Palestine and was unable to travel. He carried on a limited correspondence, which included the Tablets of the Divine Plan, a collection of fourteen letters addressed to the Baháʼís of North America, later described as one of three "charters" of the Baháʼí Faith. The letters assign a leadership role for the North American Baháʼís in spreading the religion around the planet.

Haifa was under real threat of Allied bombardment, enough that ʻAbdu'l-Bahá and other Baháʼís temporarily retreated to the hills east of ʻAkka.

ʻAbdu'l-Bahá was also under threats from Cemal Paşa, the Ottoman military chief who at one point expressed his desire to crucify him and destroy Baháʼí properties in Palestine. The swift Megiddo offensive of the British General Allenby swept away the Turkish forces in Palestine before harm was done to the Baháʼís, and the war was over less than two months later.

=== Post-war period ===
The elderly ʻAbdu'l-Bahá

The conclusion of World War I led to the openly hostile Ottoman authorities being replaced by the more friendly British Mandate, allowing for a renewal of correspondence, pilgrims, and development of the Baháʼí World Centre properties. It was during this revival of activity that the Baháʼí Faith saw an expansion and consolidation in places like Egypt, the Caucasus, Iran, Turkmenistan, North America and South Asia under the leadership of ʻAbdu'l-Bahá.

The end of the war brought about several political developments on which ʻAbdu'l-Bahá commented. The League of Nations formed in January 1920, representing the first instance of collective security through a worldwide organization. ʻAbdu'l-Bahá had written in 1875 for the need to establish a "Union of the nations of the world", and he praised the attempt through the League of Nations as an important step towards the goal. He also said that it was "incapable of establishing Universal Peace" because it did not represent all nations and had only trivial power over its member states. Around the same time, the British Mandate supported the ongoing immigration of Jews to Palestine. ʻAbdu'l-Bahá mentioned the immigration as a fulfillment of prophecy, and encouraged the Zionists to develop the land and "elevate the country for all its inhabitants... They must not work to separate the Jews from the other Palestinians...If the Zionists will mingle with the other races and live in unity with them, they will succeed. If not, they will meet certain resistance."

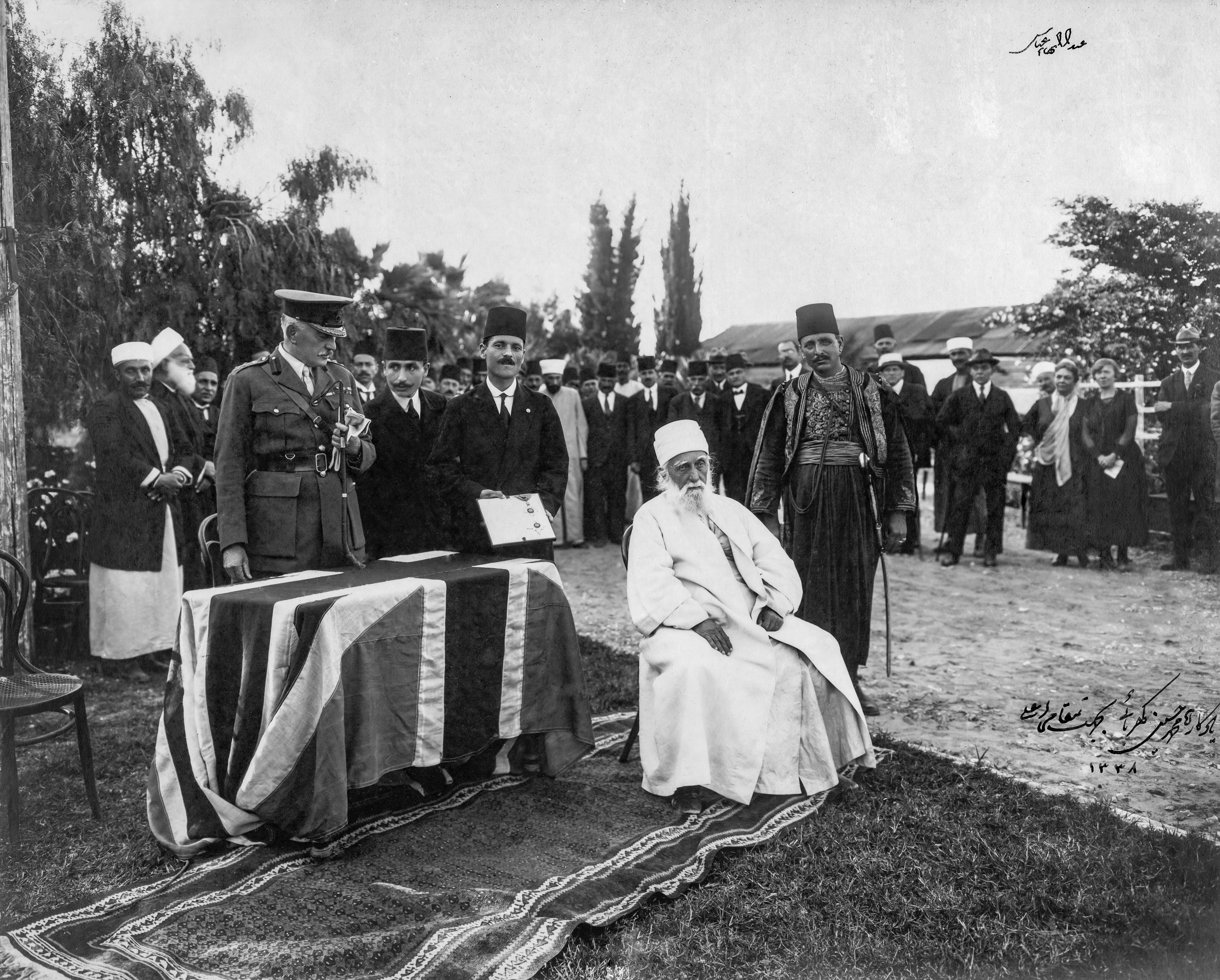
ʻAbdu'l-Bahá at his investiture ceremony as a Knight Commander of the Order of the British Empire, April 1920

The war also left the region in famine. In 1901, ʻAbdu'l-Bahá had purchased about 1704 acres of scrubland near the Jordan river and by 1907 many Baháʼís from Iran had begun sharecropping on the land. ʻAbdu'l-Bahá received between 20 and 33% of their harvest (or cash equivalent), which was shipped to Haifa. With the war still raging in 1917, ʻAbdu'l-Bahá received a large amount of wheat from the crops, and also bought other available wheat and shipped it back to Haifa. The wheat arrived just after the British captured Palestine, and as such was widely distributed to allay the famine. For this service in averting a famine in Northern Palestine he received the honour of Knight Commander of the Order of the British Empire at a ceremony held in his honor at the home of the British Governor on 27 April 1920. He was later visited by General Allenby, King Faisal (later King of Iraq), Herbert Samuel (High Commissioner for Palestine), and Ronald Storrs (Military Governor of Jerusalem).

=== Death and funeral ===
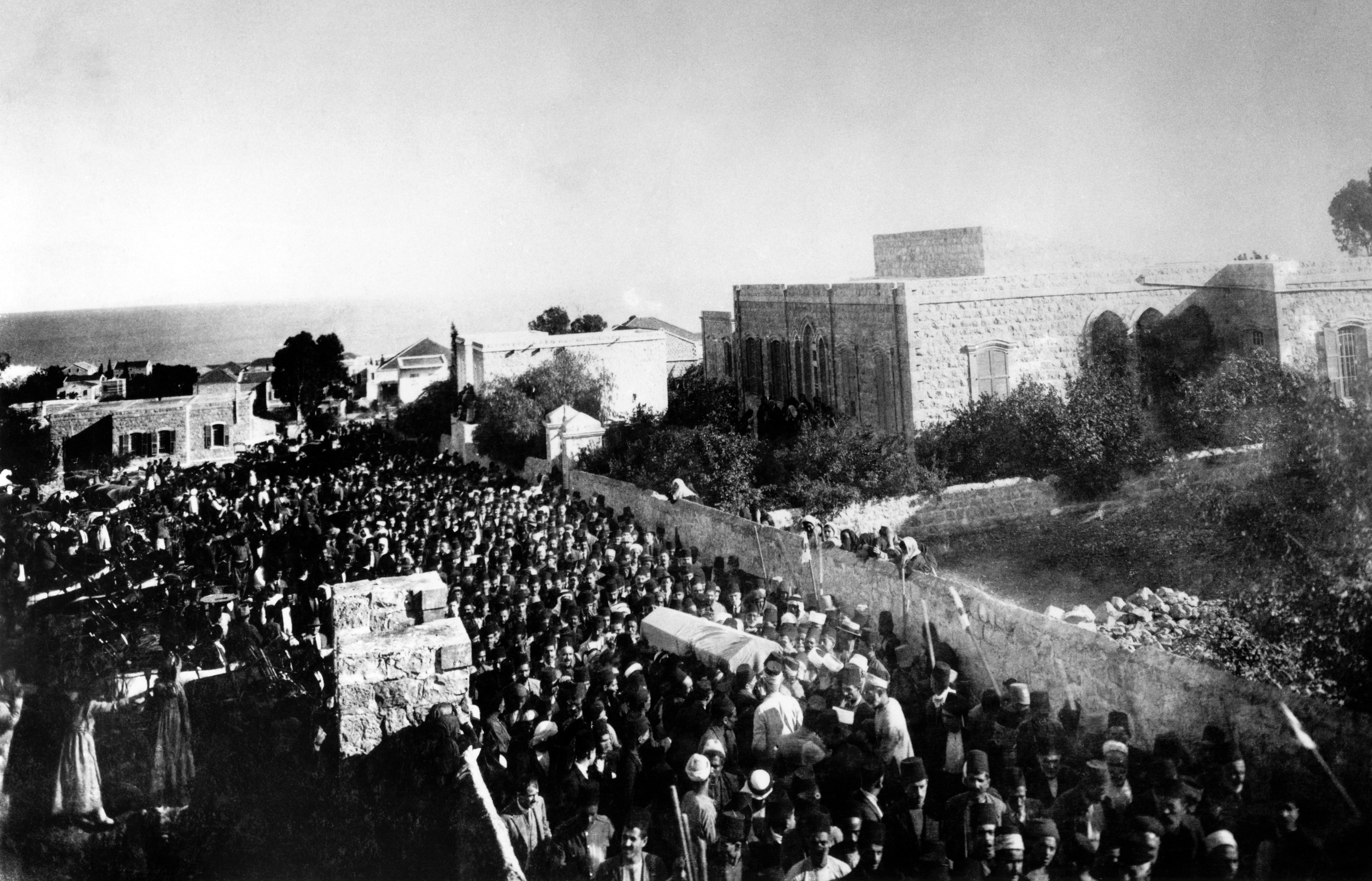
Funeral of ʻAbdu'l-Bahá in Haifa, British Mandate-Palestine

ʻAbdu'l-Bahá died on Monday, 28 November 1921, sometime after 1:15 a.m. (27th of Rabi' al-awwal, 1340 AH).

Then Colonial Secretary Winston Churchill telegraphed the High Commissioner for Palestine, "convey to the Baháʼí Community, on behalf of His Majesty's Government, their sympathy and condolence." Similar messages came from Viscount Allenby, the Council of Ministers of Iraq, and others.

On his funeral, which was held the next day, Esslemont notes:

... a funeral the like of which Haifa, nay Palestine itself, had surely never seen... so deep was the feeling that brought so many thousands of mourners together, representative of so many religions, races and tongues.

Among the talks delivered at the funeral, Shoghi Effendi records Stewart Symes (Governor of the Palestine North District) giving the following tribute:

Most of us here have, I think, a clear picture of Sir ʻAbdu'l‑Bahá ʻAbbás, of His dignified figure walking thoughtfully in our streets, of His courteous and gracious manner, of His kindness, of His love for little children and flowers, of His generosity and care for the poor and suffering. So gentle was He, and so simple, that in His presence one almost forgot that He was also a great teacher, and that His writings and His conversations have been a solace and an inspiration to hundreds and thousands of people in the East and in the West.

He was buried in the front room of the Shrine of the Báb on Mount Carmel. His interment there is meant to be temporary, until his own mausoleum can be built in the vicinity of Riḍván Garden, known as the Shrine of ʻAbdu'l-Bahá.

=== Legacy ===
ʻAbdu'l-Bahá left a Will and Testament that was originally written between 1901 and 1908 and addressed to Shoghi Effendi, who at that time was only 4–11 years old. The will appoints Shoghi Effendi as the first in a line of Guardians of the religion, a hereditary executive role that may provide authoritative interpretations of scripture. ʻAbdu'l-Bahá directed all Baháʼís to turn to him and obey him, and assured him of divine protection and guidance. The will also provided a formal reiteration of his teachings, such as the instructions to teach, manifest spiritual qualities, associate with all people, and shun Covenant-breakers. Many obligations of the Universal House of Justice and the Hands of the Cause were also elaborated. Shoghi Effendi later described the document as one of three "charters" of the Baháʼí Faith.

The authenticity and provisions of the will were almost universally accepted by Baháʼís around the world, with the exception of Ruth White and a few other Americans who tried to protest Shoghi Effendi's leadership.

In volumes of The Baháʼí World published in 1930 and 1933, Shoghi Effendi named nineteen Baháʼís as disciples of ʻAbdu'l-Bahá and heralds of the Covenant, including Thornton Chase, Hippolyte Dreyfus-Barney, John Esslemont, Lua Getsinger, and Robert Turner. No other statements about them have been found in Shoghi Effendi's writings.

During his lifetime there was some ambiguity among Baháʼís as to his station relative to Baháʼu'lláh, and later to Shoghi Effendi. Some American newspapers erroneously reported him to be a Baháʼí prophet or the return of Christ. Shoghi Effendi later formalized his legacy as the last of three "Central Figures" of the Baháʼí Faith and the "Perfect exemplar" of the teachings, also claiming that holding him on an equal status to Baháʼu'lláh or Jesus was heretical. Shoghi Effendi also wrote that during the anticipated Baháʼí dispensation of 1000 years there will be no equal to ʻAbdu'l-Bahá.

== Appearance and personality ==
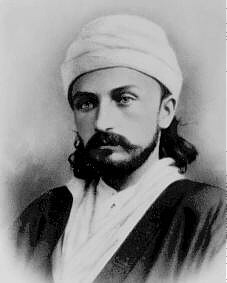
ʻAbdu'l-Bahá in 1868

ʻAbdu'l-Bahá was described as handsome, and bore striking resemblance to his mother. As an adult he reached medium height but he gave the impression of being taller. He had dark hair that flowed to his shoulders, grey coloured eyes, a fair complexion and an aquiline nose. In 1890, Orientalist Edward Granville Browne met him and wrote:

Seldom have I seen one whose appearance impressed me more. A tall strongly built man holding himself straight as an arrow, with white turban and raiment, long black locks reaching almost to the shoulder, broad powerful forehead indicating a strong intellect combined with an unswerving will, eyes keen as a hawk's, and strongly marked but pleasing features – such was my first impression of 'Abbás Efendí, "the master".

After the death of Bahá’u’lláh, ʻAbdu'l-Bahá began to visibly age. By the late 1890s his hair had turned snow-white and deep lines set on his face. As a young man he was athletic and enjoyed archery, horseback riding and swimming. Even later in his life ʻAbdu'l-Bahá remained active going for long walks in Haifa and Acre.

ʻAbdu'l-Bahá was a major presence for the Bahá’ís during his lifetime, and he continues to influence the Bahá’í community today. Bahá’ís regard ‘Abdu’l-Bahá as the perfect example of the teachings of his father and therefore strive to emulate him. Anecdotes about him are frequently used to illustrate particular points about morality and interpersonal relations. He was remembered for his charisma, compassion, philanthropy and strength in the face of suffering. John Esslemont reflected that "[‘Abdu’l‑Bahá] showed that it is still possible, amid the whirl and rush of modern life, amid the self-love and struggle for material prosperity that everywhere prevail, to live the life of entire devotion to God and to the service of one's fellows."

Even ardent enemies of the Bahá’í Faith were on occasion taken by meeting him. Mírzá 'Abdu'l-Muḥammad Írání Mu'addibu's-Sulṭán, an Iranian, and Shaykh 'Alí Yúsuf, an Arab, were both newspaper editors in Egypt who had published harsh attacks on the Bahá’í Faith in their papers. They called on ‘Abdu’l-Bahá when he was in Egypt and their attitude changed. Similarly, a Christian clergyman, Rev. J.T. Bixby, who was the author of a hostile article on the Bahá’í Faith in the United States, felt compelled to witness ‘Abdu’l‑Bahá's personal qualities. The effect of ‘Abdu’l-Bahá on those who were already committed Bahá’ís was greater still.

ʻAbdu'l-Bahá was widely known for his encounters with the poor and dying. His generosity resulted in his own family complaining that they were left with nothing. He was sensitive to people’s feelings, and later expressed his wish to be a beloved figure of the Bahá’ís saying “I am your father...and you must be glad and rejoice, for I love you exceedingly.” According to historical accounts, he had a keen sense of humour and was relaxed and informal. He was open about personal tragedies such as the loss of his children and the sufferings he'd endured as a prisoner, further enhancing his popularity.

‘Abdu’l-Bahá directed the affairs of the Bahá’í community with care. He was inclined to allow a large range of personal interpretations of the Bahá’í teachings as long as these did not obviously contradict fundamental principles. He did, however, expel members of the religion he felt were challenging his leadership and deliberately causing disunity in the community. Outbreaks of persecution of the Bahá’ís affected him deeply. He wrote personally to the families of those who had been martyred.

== Works ==
The total estimated number of tablets that ʻAbdu'l-Bahá wrote are over 27,000 of which only a fraction have been translated into English. His works fall into two groups including first his direct writings and second his lectures and speeches as noted by others. The first group includes The Secret of Divine Civilization written before 1875, A Traveller's Narrative written around 1886, the Resāla-ye sīāsīya or Sermon on the Art of Governance written in 1893, the Memorials of the Faithful, and a large number of tablets written to various people; including various Western intellectuals such as Auguste Forel which has been translated and published as the Tablet to Auguste-Henri Forel. The Secret of Divine Civilization and the Sermon on the Art of Governance were widely circulated anonymously.

The second group includes Some Answered Questions, which is an English translation of a series of table talks with Laura Barney, and Paris Talks, ʻʻAbdu'l-Bahá in London and Promulgation of Universal Peace which are respectively addresses given by ʻAbdu'l-Bahá in Paris, London and the United States.

The following is a list of some of ʻAbdu'l-Bahá's many books, tablets, and talks:

- Foundations of World Unity
- Light of the World: Selected Tablets of ‘Abdu’l-Bahá.
- Memorials of the Faithful
- Paris Talks
- Secret of Divine Civilization
- Some Answered Questions
- Tablets of the Divine Plan
- Tablet to Auguste-Henri Forel
- Tablet to The Hague
- Will and Testament of ʻAbdu'l-Bahá
- Promulgation of Universal Peace
- Selections from the Writings of ʻAbdu'l-Bahá
- Divine Philosophy
- Treatise on Politics / Sermon on the Art of Governance

== See also ==
- Baháʼu'lláh's family
- Mírzá Mihdí
- Ásíyih Khánum
- Bahíyyih Khánum
- Munirih Khánum
- Shoghi Effendi
- House of ʻAbdu'l-Bahá

== Notes ==
Religious titles
Preceded by Baháʼu'lláh as the Prophet	Leader of the Baháʼí Faith; 1892–1921	Succeeded by Shoghi Effendi as the Guardian
