= Soheil Afnan =

- Born: 1904; Acre, Israel
- Died: 1990 (aged 85–86); Istanbul

Academic background
- Education: American University of Beirut; Cambridge University (PhD)
- Thesis: Greek philosophical terms and their Arabic and Persian equivalents (1956)

Soheil Muhsin Afnan (Persian/ Arabic: سهیل محسن افنان) (1904–1990) was a Palestinian-born academic who studied philosophy and language. He was fluent in Arabic, Persian, and Greek, and his intellectual works included translations of Greek texts into Persian, as well as the publication of philosophical lexicons.

== Background and family ==
Afnan was born in Palestine to a prominent Baháʼí lineage. His parents were Mírzá Muḥsin Afnán, a cousin of the Báb, and Túbá Khánum. His maternal grandparents were ʻAbdu'l-Bahá, the son of and successor to the Baháʼí Faith founder-prophet Baháʼu'lláh, and Munirih Khánum.

Afnan received his initial education at the LaSallian Collège des Frères in Haifa and later at the American University of Beirut, where he would graduate in 1923. He would continue to the Sorbonne and Oxford University but financial constraints imposed due to the death of his father as well as the onset of World War II curtailed his studies at those institutions.

Despite having been declared a Covenant-breaker by his first cousin Shoghi Effendi, the Guardian of the Baháʼí Faith, in 1971 Afnan established a scholarship, the Fuad Muhsin Afnan Memorial Fund, for "Bahai students in need" at the American University of Beirut in honour of his younger brother who died in 1941 during an aerial bombardment in London where he was volunteering as an Air Raid Warden. Afnan never married and did not have any children.

== Academic career ==
In 1947, Afnan produced the first direct translation of Aristotle's Poetics from the Greek into Persian. Upon seeing this work, the Iranian poet Mehdi Akhavan-Sales serialised this translation in the literary magazine Iran-e Ma (Our Iran), of which he was the editor. He praised Afnan with a poem published at the end of the series which was also published in his 1951 collection Arghanoon (ارغنون), which literally translates as Organon.

Afnan obtained his PhD from Pembroke College, Cambridge in 1956, and was a lecturer in Persian at the University of Cambridge from 1958 to 1961, where he collaborated with Arthur John Arberry. He continued to produce academic works, including translations and lexicons of philosophical terminology. As late as 2006, Seyyed Hossein Nasr noted in his work Islamic Philosophy from Its Origin to the Present, that "There is not in fact even one satisfactory philosophical dictionary of Arabic and Persian terms with English equivalents. The only work of this kind available is that of Suhail Afnan, A Philosophical Lexicon in Persian and Arabic (Dar al Mashreq, Beirut, 1969). This work is, however, far from being adequate, especially as far as technical vocabulary of later schools of Islamic philosophy is concerned."

Afnan died in 1990 in Istanbul where he was conducting research at the Topkapı Palace library.

== Selected publications ==
- The Poetics of Aristotle. Translated from Greek to Persian. Luzac & Co., London, 1948
- The Persai. Translated from Greek into Persian. Adrien Maisonneuve, Paris, 1952
- Lexique des Termes de Logique en Grec, Anglais, Francais, Persan et Arab. Mimiographiee, Paris, 1954
- Avicenna, His Life and Work. George Allen and Unwin, London, 1958
- Philosophical Terminology in Arabic and Persian. E.J. Brill, 1964
- A Philosophical Lexicon in Persian and Arabic. Imprimerie Catholique, Beirut, 1968
- A Philosophical Lexicon in Persian and Arabic. Dar El-Mashreq, Beirut, 1969
- Dar Peyeh Khoshi: Short stories in Persian. Dar El-Mashreq, Beirut, 1971
- Concerning Dari Persian. Imprimerie Catholique, Beirut, 1973
- Concerning Dari Persian. Dar El-Mashreq, Beirut, 1973
- Payameh Soroush: Two plays in Persian. Aarash, Stockholm, 1998
