= Maliheh Afnan =

Palestinian artisan (1935–2016)

- مليحة أفنان
- Born: March 24, 1935; Haifa, Mandatory Palestine
- Died: January 6, 2016 (aged 80); London, United Kingdom

Maliheh Afnan (Arabic: مليحة أفنان; March 24, 1935 – January 6, 2016) was a Palestinian artist.

== Background ==
She was born in Haifa, Mandatory Palestine, to Persian parents. She was the great-granddaughter of Baháʼu'lláh, the founder of the Baháʼí Faith, although she was not a member of the Baháʼí Community.

Maliheh Afnan was exiled to Beirut with her family in 1949 during the Nakba. She received a BA from the American University of Beirut and an MA in Fine Arts from the Corcoran School of the Arts and Design in Washington, D.C. Afnan lived in Kuwait from 1963 to 1966, in Beirut from 1966 to 1974 and in Paris from 1974 until 1997, when she moved to London.

Afnan's work has been shown primarily in France and in London. Her first solo show, in a Basel gallery in 1971, was organized by the American artist Mark Tobey. Her work is included in the collections of the Metropolitan Museum of Art in New York City, the British Museum in London, the Written Art Collection in Germany, the Institut du Monde Arabe in Paris and the BAII Bank Collection in Paris.

She died in London at the age of 80.

== Work ==
As a child, Afnan was fascinated by written language and calligraphy. Her own mail came to her home in three languages- Arabic, English, and Hebrew. However, at the time, she couldn’t read or write, and would instead fill pages with invented writing. This trend continued into her present works, where imagined writing and numbers are always present—even in the landscapes. “I love looking at scripts,” she said. “They excite me visually and excite me even further when I can’t read then because then it’s so much more mysterious and they could be so many other things, rather than some banal statement.” Later in life, she pulled more inspiration from Mark Tobey, who worked in the abstract script. He mentored her while she visited Switzerland.

During the Lebanese Civil War, she “took a blowtorch to” her art. She says her work is composed of traces of the past—not just hers, but the past of her family and predecessors as well.

Her work is mostly done on paper, with palettes composed of browns, blacks and reds. People have compared it to ancient scrolls and tablature. She pulled from a variety of influences, likely due to her upbringing in middle eastern culture and her education and later life in the western world.

The art that brought her into the spotlight of the art world was her series entitled Veiled. After 9/11, Veiled drew from the stereotype of what Persian women looked like, due to the veils they would wear. Afnan took the veil and turned it into a different type of veil. Her Veiled series focuses on the non-physical veils all humans have inside of themselves: “Veiled emotions, veiled threats, veiled feelings.” The material Afnan used for the veils over top of her works was medical gauze from the pharmacy. She took the gauze and coloured it in blacks and browns, laying it over the script, sometimes even making new forms with it.

Afnan talked about her work as having layers and enjoyed the idea of the “layers” of life showing themselves in her work. She demonstrated her pieces having the layers of old civilizations, and said her layers of colour are similar to layers of the sun lain over the paper.

While she isn’t as known for them, Afnan also worked with plaster reliefs. She would create a mould and fill it with plaster, removing it once it is dry. She painted over the plaster using “earth colours, burnt, rust colours.”

She also created what one might call portraits, instead of calling them personages. While portraits have specific models, hers are not of any person in particular. She referred to them as amalgamations of people she has known, people she has seen, and people she has imagined.

Afnan rejected labels like “Middle Eastern Artist” and “Female Artist,” insisting those are just things that happen to be true. She believed that if instead of focusing on what makes people different, we should focus on our “common denominator” of humanity, and that the world would be better for it.

She also expressed her love for accidents. Afnan said that she never planned her work ahead of time, and said, “Often the accident is much more profound than what you are planning to do and what you are doing." A story she told by this is one about an old plaster relief—her old cat, while she was away, knocked over one of her plaster tablets. When she glued it back together, she discovered it looked “10 times better” than the original. This is hand in hand with her desire to see the funny side in everything. “Even the most terrible tragedies have a funny side,” she said. She believed it was the humour of tragic situations that kept things from getting too hopeless, no matter the situation.

Afnan also expressed the belief that it is important to stick to your personal principles.

In 2023 her work was included in the exhibition Action, Gesture, Paint: Women Artists and Global Abstraction 1940-1970 at the Whitechapel Gallery in London.

== Tribute ==
On July 5, 2021, Google celebrated her with a Google Doodle.
