= Remey =

Remey is a surname. Notable people with the surname include:

- Ethel Remey (1895–1979), American actress
- George C. Remey (1841–1929), American admiral
- Mason Remey (1874–1974), American religious leader
- William Butler Remey (1842–1895), American military officer

== See also ==
- USS Remey, United States Navy ship, in service from 1943 to 1963
