= Mason Remey =

American religious leader (1874–1974)

- Born: Charles Mason Remey; 15 May 1874; Burlington, Iowa, U.S.
- Died: 4 February 1974 (aged 99); Florence, Italy
- Education: Cornell University; École des Beaux-Arts
- Occupation: Religious leader
- Spouse: Gertrude Heim Klemm (m. 1931; died 1932)
- Father: George C. Remey
- Relatives: William Butler Remey (uncle); Charles Mason (grandfather)

Charles Mason Remey (15 May 1874 – 4 February 1974) was a prominent member of the early American Baháʼí community, and served in several important administrative capacities. He is well-known for an attempted schism of 1960, in which he claimed leadership and was rejected by the overwhelming majority of Baháʼís, who regard him as a Covenant-breaker.

Remey came from a distinguished naval family of Washington, D.C., and was among the first Baháʼís of the United States. He was a contemporary of ʻAbdu'l-Bahá, one of the faith's three central figures, and traveled around the world as a teacher of the faith. As an architect, he designed the Houses of Worship in Kampala and Sydney, both dedicated in 1961, as well as the International Archives building in Haifa.

In 1951 he was appointed by Shoghi Effendi as the president of the International Baháʼí Council, and later as a Hand of the Cause. When Shoghi Effendi died in 1957, Remey and the other Hands signed a declaration that he died without leaving a designated successor as Guardian. Remey was elected to serve as one of the nine custodial Hands, a body that became the interim leadership until the election of the Universal House of Justice in 1963.

In 1960, Remey declared himself to be the second Guardian and expected the allegiance of the world's Baháʼís. His claim was rejected by all the other Hands of the Cause due to his lack of scriptural authority, and he was excommunicated along with about 100 supporters, mostly from the United States. Before his death, Remey's followers split into several rival factions, all of which declined over time. (Note: For example, Balch 1997, p. 271 and Momen 1995, g.2. See Baháʼí divisions#Size and demographics for estimates of size.)

== Background ==
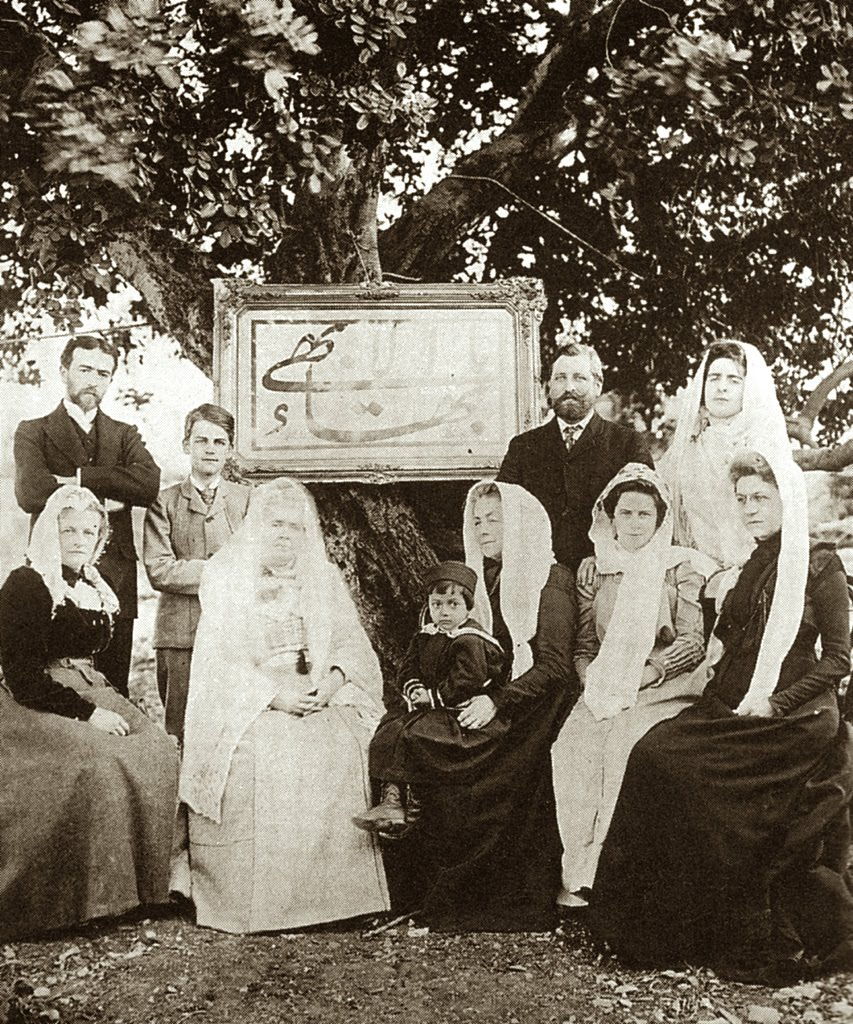
Western Baháʼí pilgrims in Akka in early 1901. Seated left to right: Ethel Jenner Rosenberg, Madam Jackson, Shoghi Effendi, Helen Ellis Cole, Lua Getsinger, Emogene Hoagg; standing left to right: Charles Mason Remey, Sigurd Russell, Edward Getsinger and Laura Clifford Barney.

Born in Burlington, Iowa, on 15 May 1874, Remey was the eldest of six children from Rear Admiral George Collier Remey and Mary Josephine Mason Remey. The Navy destroyer USS Remey (1943–1974) was named after his father. His maternal grandfather, Charles Mason, was the first Chief Justice of Iowa and candidate for governor in 1867.

Remey's parents raised him in the Episcopal Church. He studied comparative religion in college, including a course on Buddhism, which made him receptive to other religions.

Remey studied architecture at Cornell University (1893–1896) without completing a degree, and the École des Beaux-Arts in Paris (1896–1903). From 1904 to 1908, he became an instructor of architecture at George Washington University.

While studying in Paris Remey learned of the Baháʼí Faith from May (Bolles) Maxwell, the first Baháʼí in Paris, and he accepted it on 31 December 1899, becoming the third Baháʼí in the city. A few months later, the Persian Baháʼí teacher `Abdu’l-Karím-i-ihrání came to Paris and taught the new Baháʼís more about the faith. From Paris, Remey went on pilgrimage and met ʻAbdu'l-Bahá first in February 1901, then in spring/summer that year Mírzá Abu'l-Faḍl visited Paris and taught the Baháʼís there.

=== Baháʼí service, 1903–1950 ===
After embracing the Baháʼí Faith in Paris, Remey returned to Washington, D.C., and became a prominent author, public speaker, and organizer. Remey proposed the idea to the Baha'is in Washington to organize the first local Spiritual Assembly in the city, which he was elected to on 14 March 1907. He made a second pilgrimage to see ʻAbdu'l-Bahá in 1907, and returned in 1908, 1909, 1914, and 1921. He traveled extensively to lecture in the interests of the faith, visiting Iran, Russia, and Central asia in 1908, and in 1910 became the first Baháʼí to circle the globe on teaching trips, along with his companion Howard Struven. Robert Stockman wrote of his journeys:

In November 1909 Charles Mason Remey and Howard Struven began the first Bahá’í teaching trip to circle the globe. Leaving San Francisco, they traveled to Hawaii, four cities in Japan, Shanghai, Singapore, three cities in Burma, at least eight cities in India, and Palestine; they returned to the United States in June 1910. In 1914 Remey and George Latimer crossed military lines to teach the Faith in France, England, and Germany. Lesser known traveling teaching trips occurred in 1919, 1943, and 1944, to the American south; 1945, to the Northeastern United States; 1945–46, to Latin America; 1946, to the Midwest; 1947, to the American south, Europe, and Latin America; 1948, to Germany, Austria, Italy, and England; and 1949, to Europe.

According to William Garlington, Washington D.C. became the third most influential group of American Baháʼís in the first decade of the 20th century (after Chicago and New York), because of "its talented membership, which included leaders such as Laura Barney, Mason Remey, and Pauline Hannen."

At the first national convention of American Baháʼís in March 1909, Remey was the delegate representing Washington, and was elected to the executive committee of the "Bahai Temple Unity", a precursor to the National Spiritual Assembly. In 1917–1918 Remey chaired a committee investigating the Chicago Reading Room, a study group that combined the teachings of Baháʼu'lláh with those of a Bostonian occultist, ultimately expelling its members as "violators". Remey's loyalty brought him praise from ʻAbdu'l-Bahá and later Shoghi Effendi mentioned him as one of the most eminent Baháʼís in America.

Remey was also a prolific writer, and published several volumes on Baháʼí history and teachings. His first pamphlet was published in 1905 and was among the first material on the religion available to American Baháʼís. In part due to his fear of global cataclysm, Remey compiled much of his records and in 1940 he provided copies to several public libraries, requesting them not to be opened until 1995.

=== Marriage ===
According to Juliet Thompson's diary, ʻAbdu'l-Bahá suggested that she marry Remey, and in 1909 asked her how she felt about it. They were engaged for a time but did not marry. Thompson anguished over her decision, which she felt would cause ʻAbdu'l-Baha disappointment.

During the 1930s, Remey lived in Washington, D.C. where he enjoyed an active social life. He was briefly married to heiress Gertrude Heim Klemm from 17 July 1931 until her suicide on 5 August 1932 (Klemm's gravestone gives the Paris wedding as 11 July). They had no children.

== Architectural projects ==
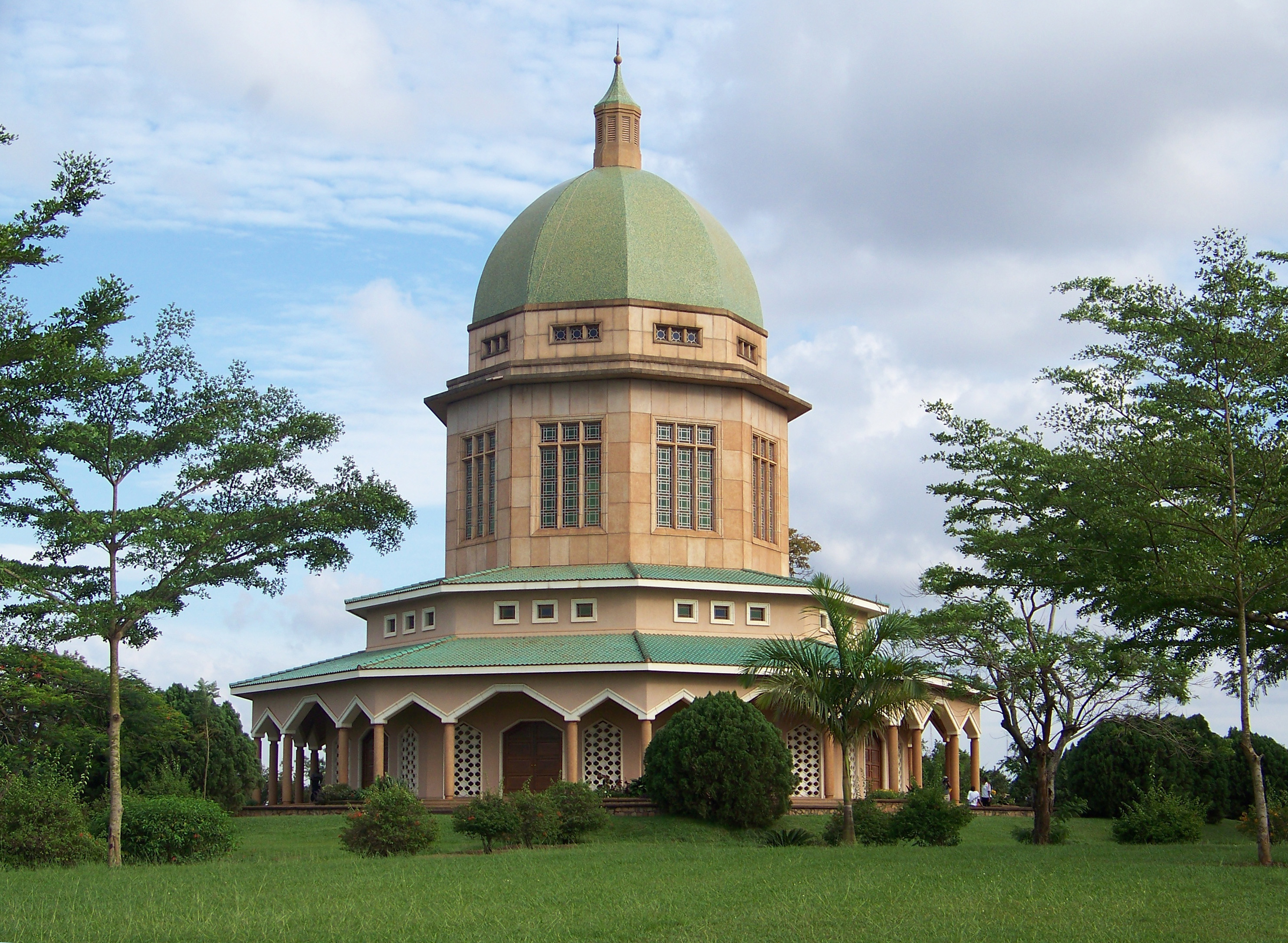
Baháʼí temple in Kampala, Uganda.

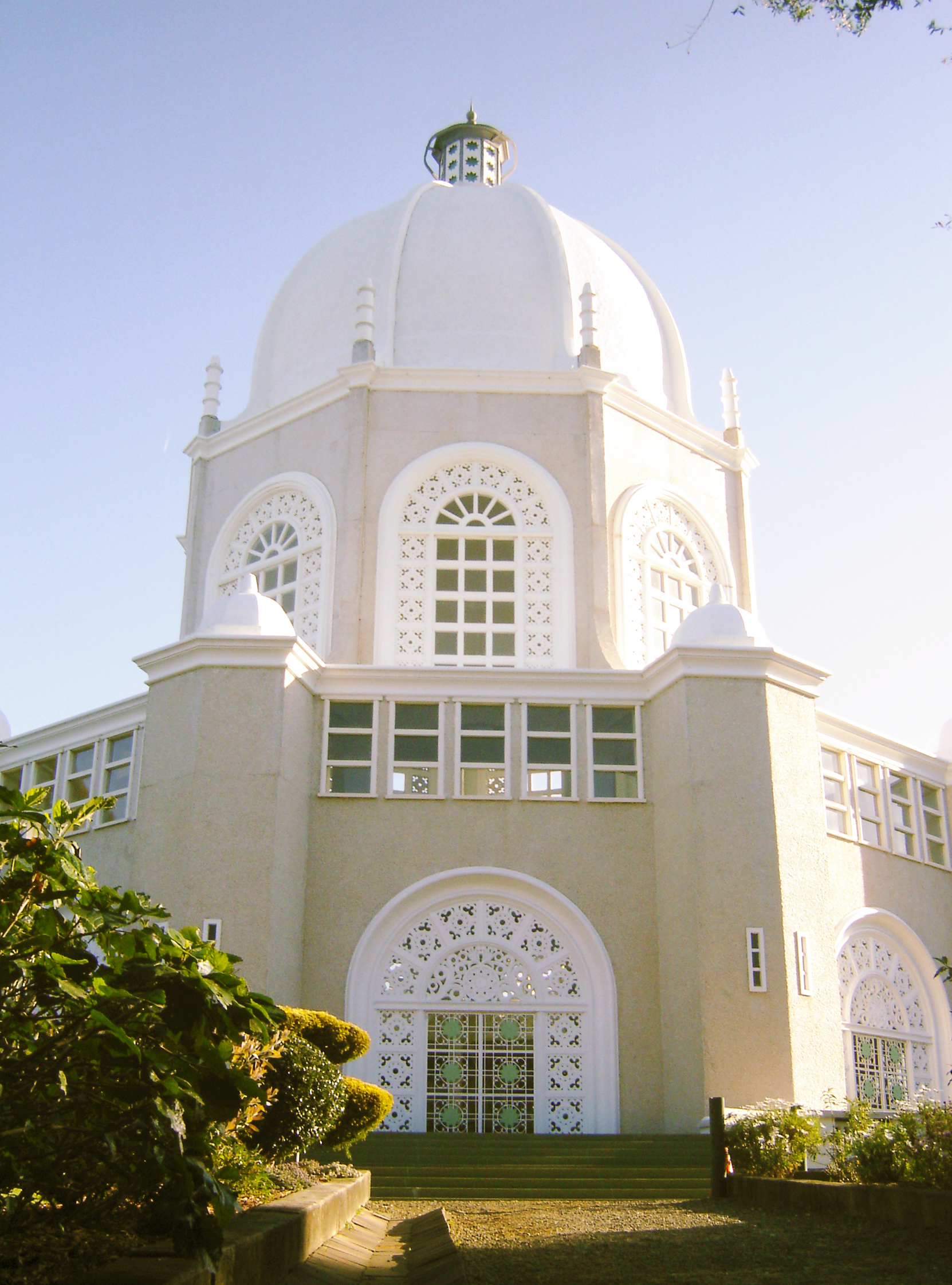
Baháʼí temple in Sydney, Australia.

Design for Baháʼí temple in Tehran.

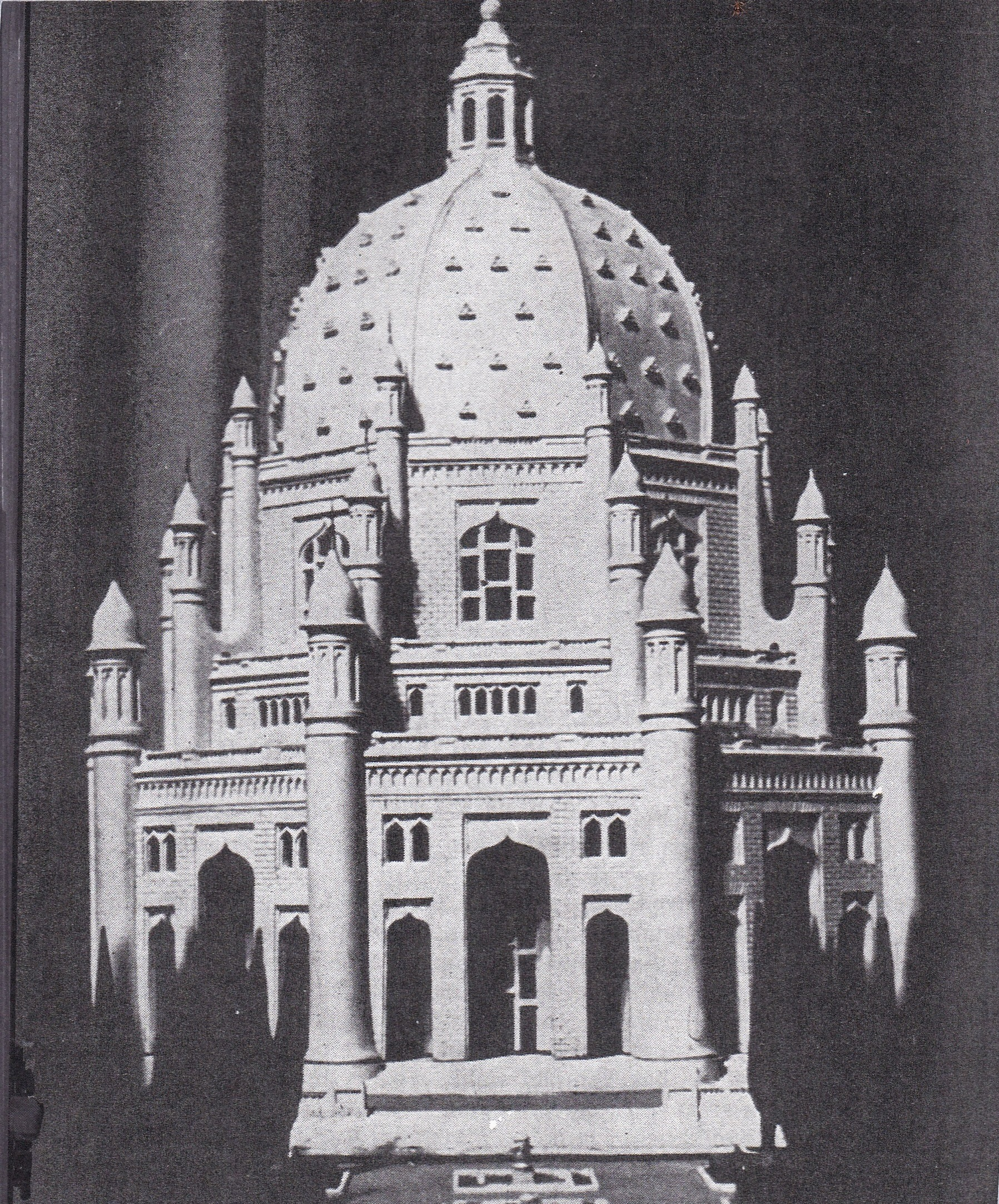
Model for Baháʼí temple on Mount Carmel.

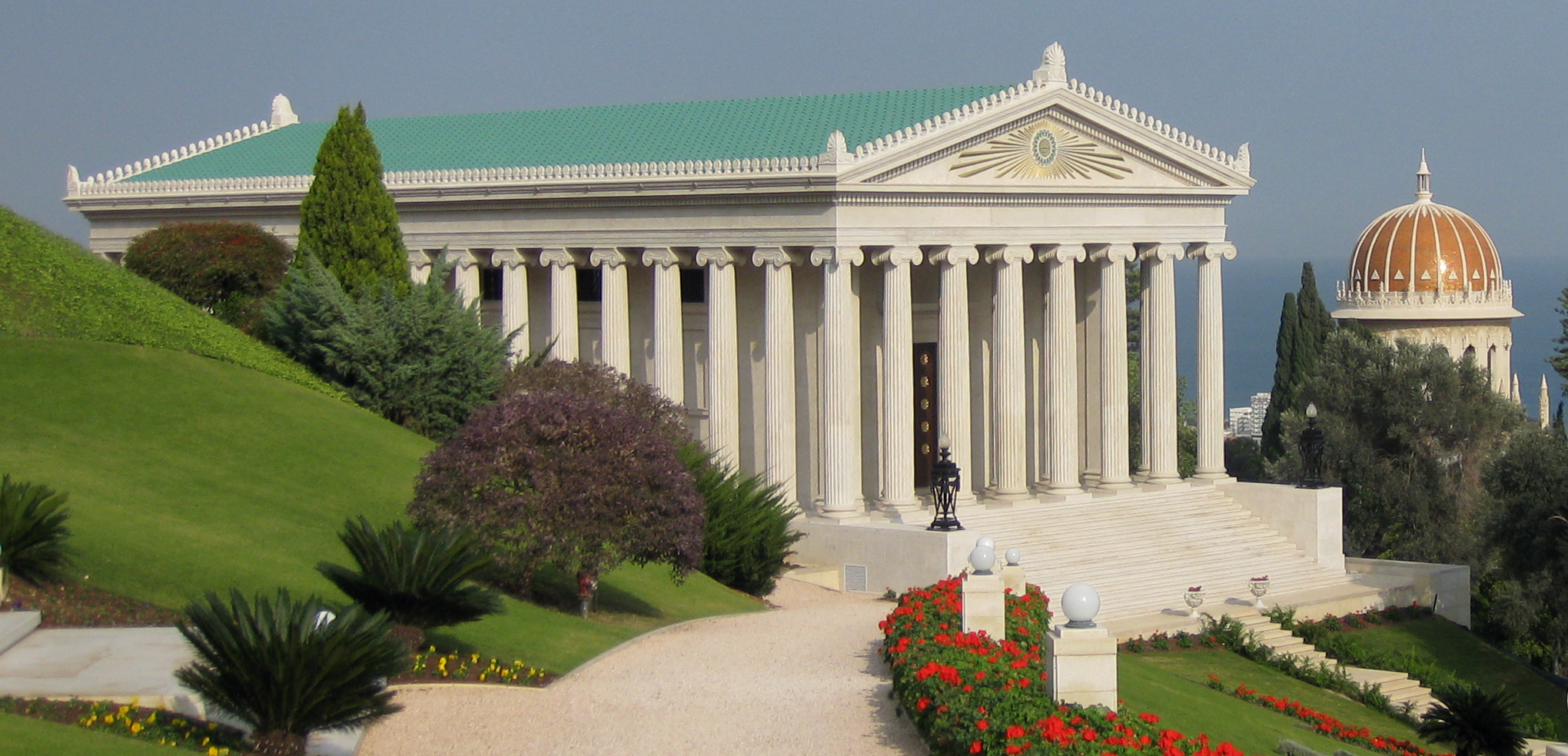
The International Archives

Having studied architecture, Remey made significant achievements in the design of several Baháʼí buildings. Under the guidance of Shoghi Effendi, his designs were used in the temples in Kampala and Sydney (pictured), both dedicated in 1961.

Before 1944, a site was selected and purchased for a House of Worship in Tehran, Iran. Upon the request of Shoghi Effendi, Remey provided a design for this temple, which he approved. The drawing of it was published in The Bahá'í World XIV: 1963–1968, p. 495. The construction of this temple has been delayed indefinitely, however, due to the hostile political situation in Iran.

A site has been selected for a House of Worship in the vicinity of the Baháʼí World Centre on Mount Carmel in Haifa, Israel. Since 1971, an obelisk has marked the location where it will be constructed. The design by Mason Remey was approved by Shoghi Effendi. A photo of that model can be found in Baha'i World vol. XII, p. 548. It now stands in the upper hall of the Mansion of Bahjí.

Remey also designed the International Archives Building, completed in 1957. His design was based on the Parthenon.

He provided many design proposals for the Baháʼí temples in Wilmette and Frankfurt, but designs by Louis Bourgeois and Teuto Rocholl, respectively, were selected instead. He also made suggestions for the design of the Shrine of the Báb.

=== The Remeum ===
Remey had a large personal fortune from his family and his late wife. He spent much of it on two projects: his mansion on Embassy Row in Washington, built around 1930, and the "Remeum".

Remey contracted with Pohick Church in 1937 to build a huge family mausoleum on its grounds in Virginia, to be located on five acres of land about one half-mile south of the church building. Construction began in 1939. According to an article in the Washington Evening Star and Daily News, the mausoleum was planned as a "magnificent complex of walled courtyards, underground chambers with soaring vaulted ceilings, marble reliefs and statues, carved pillars, chapels and burial vaults". It was to be four times the size of Pohick Church, using over two million bricks, and costing over a million dollars ($18.9 million in 2021 dollars). It had relief panels depicting historical events in the life of Remey's family, such as the landing of the Mayflower and the sinking of the USS Yorktown; a pair of massive lions guarding the entrance; life-size statues; depictions of Christian saints; and a huge ornate sarcophagus of Portuguese marble was prepared for himself. Remey transported the bodies of fifteen relatives to the Remeum.

The grounds were landscaped. The complex had electric chandeliers, ventilation and plumbing. A trust account was established with the church for maintenance. Remey planned to crown it with a three-story structure that would have dwarfed the church. The Remeum was never finished.

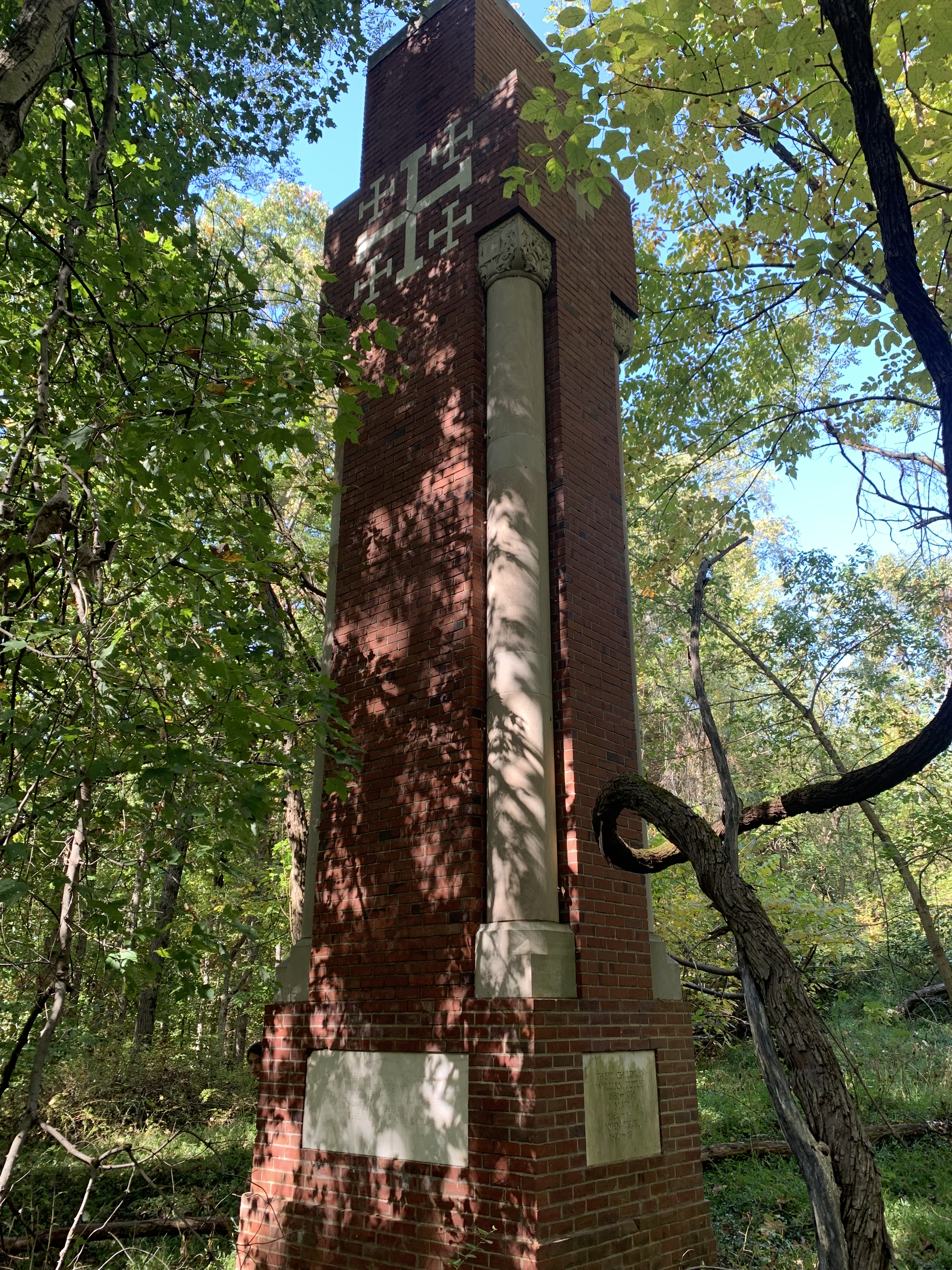
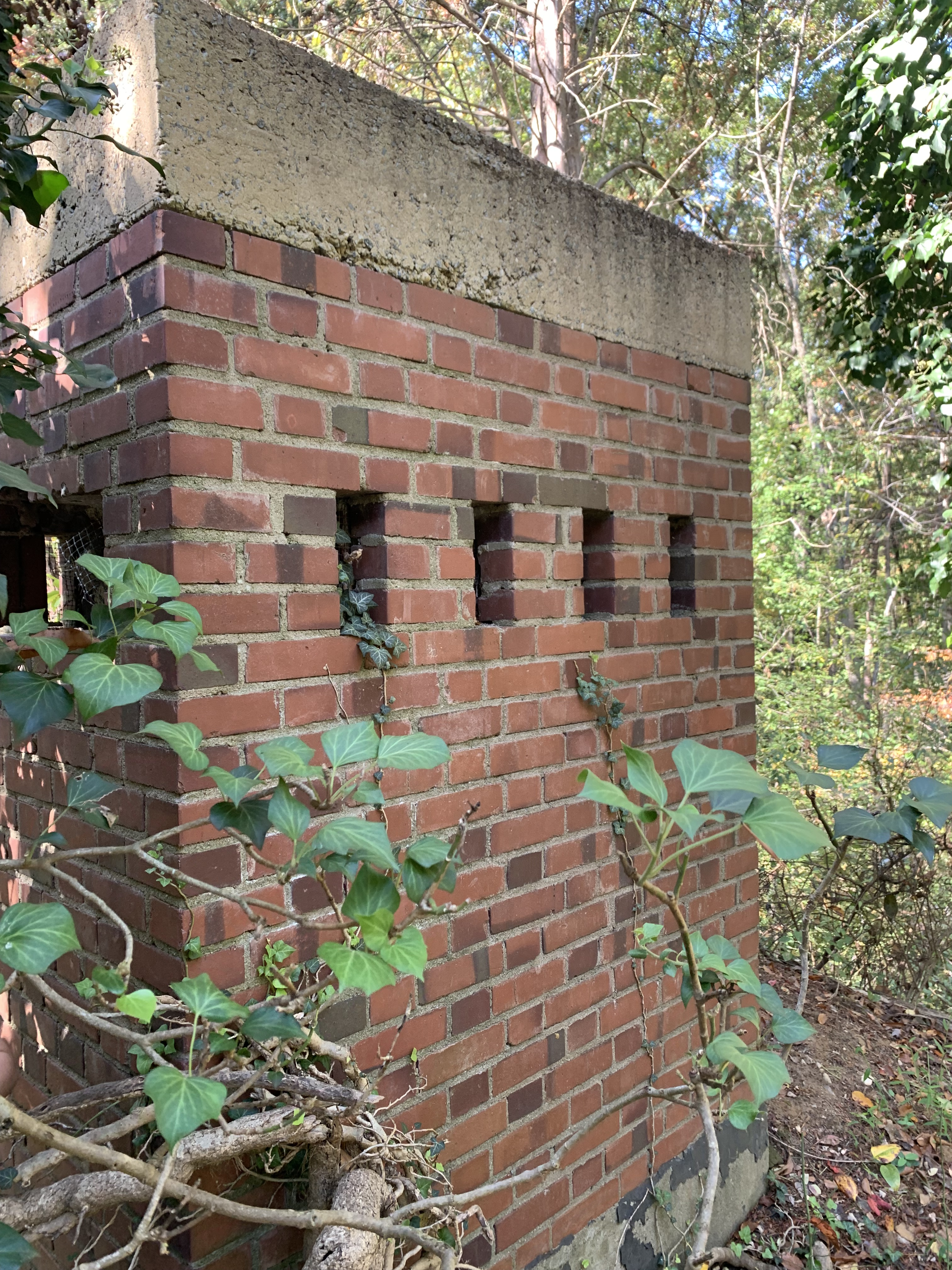
The only above-ground remnants of Remey's mausoleum are the monument (left) and two chimney vents, one of which is shown (right). The vast underground complex was abandoned and filled in with dirt from nearby road construction sometime after 1973.

Problems soon developed in the 1950s, and the mausoleum site became the target of vandals. As a preventative measure, the entrance was bricked up to prevent access, but the wall was breached in 1956 by high school boys with axes, as reported by the Morning Star:

Rather than being the thing of beauty as it was designed, the mausoleum now resembles a dump. Fragments of smashed marble reliefs and statues litter the floors, along with beer cans, whiskey bottles and old candles. Wooden coffins and chests have been broken to bits and their charred remnants scattered....

Thousands of tiny glass fragments designed to form mosaics have been poured into the ground. Statues too large to steal or smash have been chipped and painted or blackened with soot from candles and torches. ... What was planned to serve as a place of worship and remembrance is now the scene of nocturnal beer busts, drug parties, high school initiations and exploring expeditions. ...

An unknown number of urns containing the ashes of cremated bodies still lie amidst the trash in the mausoleum.

By 1958 the church vestry became concerned, and in 1962 refused to grant permission for any more work to be done on the site. Soon negotiations began to break the original contract; in 1968 the property reverted to the church, and Remey was given five years to remove anything of value from the site. Most of the dead were taken by relatives to another family cemetery in New York; Remey's wife Gertrude was reinterred in the main church cemetery. After the last of the bodies was removed, the Remeum was demolished beginning in 1973 on the orders of the Episcopal church, and the last of the aboveground ruins was finally bulldozed ten years later. Little remains on the site to mark the former presence of the complex save an obelisk dedicated to Remey's parents and a pair of structures which served as chimneys or vents.

Robert Stockman wrote:

The Remeum reflected a nearly obsessive concern about immortality and his future place in history that Remey increasingly manifested as he grew older.

== Service in Haifa, 1950–1959 ==
In November 1950, Shoghi Effendi announced to a small group, including Remey, his intention of appointing them to an International Baháʼí Council. Remey moved his residence from Washington to Haifa, and the public announcement of the Council was made on 9 January 1951. The Council was the first international Baháʼí body, intended to be a forerunner to the Universal House of Justice while forging links with authorities in the newly emerged Israel, assisting with the completion of the Shrine of the Báb, and negotiating for status as a religious court in Israel.

Remey was appointed president of the council in March 1951, with Amelia Collins as vice-president. A further announcement in March 1952 appointed several more officers to the Council and Rúhíyyih Khánum as the liaison between the Council and the Guardian.

Remey was included in Shoghi Effendi's first contingent of 12 appointments to the rank of Hand of the Cause on 24 December 1951. Remey attended all four international teaching conferences in 1953, in Kampala, Chicago, Stockholm, and New Delhi.

During this time he continued several Baháʼí architectural projects.

=== Death of Shoghi Effendi ===
The Baháʼí world entered a leadership crisis upon the death of Shoghi Effendi, who died without children or an appointed successor. All male descendants of Baha'u'llah were either dead or excommunicated, and the hereditary institution of the Guardian was defunct.

When Shoghi Effendi died on 4 November 1957, his personal room and safe were sealed and constantly guarded. 26 of the 27 living Hands arrived by 17 November, and on 19 November, Mason Remey along with 8 others found all seals intact and searched the room for a will, which was not found.

=== First Conclave ===
Later the Hands of the Cause met in a private conclave at Bahjí on 20 November. They decided that the situation of the Guardian having died without being able to appoint a successor was a situation not dealt with in the texts that define the Baháʼí administration, and that the matter would need to be reviewed and adjudicated by the Universal House of Justice, an institution envisaged by Baha'u'llah that had not yet been elected. Their unanimous proclamation made 25 November stated,

Shoghi Effendi Rabbani, passed away... without having appointed his successor;

AND WHEREAS it is now fallen upon us... to preserve the unity, the security and the development of the Baháʼí World Community and all its institutions;

AND WHEREAS in accordance with the Will and Testament of ʻAbdu'l-Bahá...;

We nominate and appoint from our own number to act on our behalf as the Custodians of the Baháʼí World Faith [list of nine] to exercise... all such functions, rights and powers in succession to the Guardian of the Baháʼí Faith... as are necessary to serve the interests of the Baháʼí World Faith, and this until such time as the Universal House of Justice, upon being duly established and elected... may otherwise determine.

Remey signed the declaration that Shoghi Effendi died "without having appointed his successor" and was also appointed as one of the Custodians to stay in Haifa. Several other proclamations were made that day specifying the authority and procedural functioning of the Hands and the Custodians. Among them were,

- "That the entire body of the Hands of the Cause, meeting annually or whenever convened by the nine Hands, shall determine when and how the International Baháʼí Council shall pass through the successive stages outlined by Shoghi Effendi culminating in the election of the Universal House of Justice;"
- "That the authority to expel violators from the Faith shall be vested in the body of nine Hands..."

A longer proclamation, also signed by all the Hands, was sent to the Baháʼís of the world on 25 November, which mentioned several points about the continuation of authority of the Baháʼí Faith:

The Aghsán (branches) one and all are either dead or have been declared violators of the Covenant by the Guardian... The first effect of the realization that no successor to Shoghi Effendi could have been appointed by him was to plunge the Hands of the Cause into the very abyss of despair.

...we Hands of the Cause have constituted a body of nine Hands to serve at the Baháʼí World Centre. This body of nine Hands will energetically deal with the protection of the Faith whenever attacks, whether from within or outside the Baháʼí community, are reported by Hands from their areas or by National or Regional Assemblies or whether they arise within the Holy Land. ... As to the International Baháʼí Council... that body will in the course of time finally fulfil its purpose through the formation of the Universal House of Justice... The main work of the Council has been to act as the Guardian's representative in matters involving the Israeli Government and its courts of law. ... Meanwhile the entire body of the Hands... will decide when and how the International Baháʼí Council is to evolve through the successive stages outlined by the Guardian, culminating in the call to election of the Universal House of Justice by the membership of all National Spiritual Assemblies.

When that divinely ordained body comes into existence, all the conditions of the Faith can be examined anew...

Following these events Time magazine reported that there were debates about two possible candidates for Guardian. Though the Hands dedicated to not disclose any details of the conclaves, Remey later revealed memoirs with details of the events. He wrote that his status as president of the International Baha'i Council was never mentioned in any of the conclaves, and that the idea of not having another Guardian was introduced by Rahmatu'lláh Muhájir.

The idea of no single person as the supreme head of the religion was disturbing to some Baháʼí of the time. In 1958 two American Hands, Paul Haney and Corinne True, and the NSA began circulating a document expressing their belief that the "door to the appointment of a second Guardian... is closed", but it was blocked by an urgent cablegram from the custodial Hands in Haifa, indicating that they were "greatly disturbed" and to delete all references to it.

== Claim to Guardianship, 1960–1974 ==
As early as January 1959, Remey believed that he was the second Guardian and successor to Shoghi Effendi. According to Remey, this idea developed gradually since the first conclave of the Hands, and at the second conclave (November 1958) he warned the others that they were violating the Covenant by not allowing the continuation of the Guardianship. At the third conclave (November 1959), Remey refused to sign the joint statement of the Hands, which was converting the International Council from an appointed to an elected body, an act that would end his position as president. He then abandoned his position, moved to Washington, and began to circulate the claim that he should be recognized as the second Guardian.

=== Proclamation ===
In April 1960, Remey wrote an announcement that he was the successor to Shoghi Effendi, and requested that it be read at the upcoming national convention. In his cover letter to Charles Wolcott, secretary of the National Spiritual Assembly of the United States, he wrote,

Enclosed I send you my Proclamation of my Guardianship of the Baha'i Faith.

... If it be the wish of the convention that I go to the Wilmette at this time to meet the Baha'is of America and further proclaim, declare and explain my status for life as commander in chief of Baha'i affairs of the world as I was appointed to do by our late Beloved Guardian as the Second Guardian of the Baha'i Faith, I will be very pleased indeed to meet the convention.

Should the convention wish this, let them send three believers of their choice to Washington bringing me their invitation to come to them – these three representatives of the convention to usher me to the convention in waiting for me...

Remey believed his appointment as president of the international council represented an appointment by Shoghi Effendi as Guardian, because the appointed council was a precursor to the elected Universal House of Justice. In his intended announcement at the convention, he wrote,

The Beloved Guardian singled me, Mason Remey, out from amongst all of the Believers upon earth to occupy the position of President of the Baha'i International Council. This is the only position suggestive of authority that Shoghi Effendi ever bestowed upon anyone, the only special and specific appointment of authority to any man ever made by him.

The Beloved Guardian declared the Baha'i International Council to be the forerunner of and the first step toward the establishment of the Universal House of Justice... ...

Therefore, inasmuch as The Beloved Guardian in His Infallibility has thus placed me in command of the Faith... I can do nothing but assume my place that he has given me with all of the responsibilities, the prerequisites and emoluments that go with this position...

Remey wrote that his delay in announcing his status was to give others "ample time to discover for themselves", but "until now no one, other than I have discovered that such authority was vested in me". He claimed in the proclamation that he made the declaration as Guardian to the Hands previously (which they claimed was false), and that he had "definitely known for the past twelve years more or less". He said that,

All these plans of the Hands of the Faith for 1963 that are so absorbing and confusing to the people of the Faith must be dropped and stopped immediately. I am the only one who can command this situation so I have arisen to do so for I alone in all this world have been given the authority and the power to accomplish this.

...

I now command the Hands of the Faith to stop all of their preparations for 1963 and furthermore I command all believers... to immediately cease cooperating with and giving support to this fallacious program for 1963.

=== Expulsion ===
His letter to the convention was refused. After a brief attempt at reconciliation and some hesitation among the Hands, he was declared a Covenant-breaker by all 26 remaining Hands of the Cause on 26 July 1960, along with anyone actively supporting his claims. Almost the whole Baháʼí world rejected his claim, which did not even address the requirements that Guardians be descendants of Baha'u'llah — making him ineligible — and that appointments must be clearly confirmed by the nine resident Hands of the Cause in Haifa.

Remey gained very little support around the world, and himself noted that "almost the entire Baha'i world" rejected his claim. He sent his proclamation to other National Spiritual Assemblies, and a majority of the one in France accepted him. The 11 other extant National Assemblies rejected him. He gained supporters mostly from the United States, but also in parts of Europe, Pakistan (mostly in Faisalabad and Sialkot), and in Lucknow, India. Estimates of Remey's initial following range from 15, to 100, to 150, to several hundred individuals.

The Hands sent Abu'l-Qásim Faizi to France as their representative, with specific instructions to dissolve the National Assembly and call for a new election.

Although initially disturbed, the mainstream Baháʼís paid little attention to his movement within a few years. The Universal House of Justice was elected in 1963, and the Custodians officially passed their authority as the head of the Faith to the Universal House of Justice, which soon announced that it did not have the power to appoint or legislate to make possible the appointment of a second Guardian to succeed Shoghi Effendi.

=== Consolidation ===
Remey wrote three letters to his supporters soon after his excommunication, sharing his belief that "the only true and legitimate Baha'is are those now serving under the Second Guardian of the Faith." He initially called his sect the Orthodox Baha'is Under the Hereditary Guardianship.

Remey settled in Florence, Italy, until the end of his life. From there he appointed three local spiritual assemblies in Santa Fe, New Mexico, Rawalpindi, Pakistan, and Lucknow, India, then organized the election of two National Assemblies in 1963 – in the United States and Pakistan.

In 1964 the Santa Fe assembly filed a lawsuit against the National Spiritual Assembly (NSA) of the Baháʼís of the United States to receive the legal title to the Baháʼí House of Worship in Illinois, and all other property owned by the NSA. The NSA counter-sued and won. The Santa Fe assembly lost the right to use the term "Baháʼí" in printed material. Remey then changed the name of his sect from "Baháʼís Under the Hereditary Guardianship" to "Abha World Faith" and also referred to it as the "Orthodox Faith of Baháʼu'lláh" or "Orthodox Abha World Faith", and himself as the "Guardian of the Orthodox Baha'is". In 1966, Remey asked the Santa Fe assembly to dissolve, as well as the second International Baháʼí Council that he had appointed with Joel Marangella, residing in France, as president.

=== Fracturing ===
Beginning in 1966–67, Remey was abandoned by almost all of his followers, and his movement began to weaken and decline rapidly. Besides dissolving the institutions that he had organized, Remey began focusing on impending global catastrophe and criticizing Shoghi Effendi.

In the late 1940s, he expressed his belief that nuclear war would destroy much of the world, and by the 1960s he stated publicly that the Earth's axis would tilt and produce global floods. He encouraged his followers to move to high ground in the Rocky Mountains to avoid the imminent floods. These beliefs were the foundation of why he deposited copies of his memoirs in several prominent libraries in 1940, to ensure that a set would survive.

In 1966 he became very critical of Shoghi Effendi. In a letter that year he reasoned that Shoghi Effendi had been practicing the religion of the Báb, and that,

The first Guardian of the Faith so construed the Master Abdu'l Baha's Will and Testament that he formed his Administration upon the Babi Faith and not upon the Baha'i Faith. This mistake has caused so much confusion and misunderstanding and trouble that the only thing for the second Guardian to do, to set matters aright, is to discard all which Shoghi Effendi did and to institute a New Faith which shall be the Orthodox Faith under the Holy Name of ABHA in order to carry out the conditions that will lead to the establishment of the TRUE Baha'i Faith (of Baha'u'llah) which Faith has not yet been established in the world.

In a further letter the following year, Remey again repeated that, "the First Guardian Shoghi Effendi built his Administration about the Babi Faith and not about the Baha'i Faith. Shoghi Effendi was a very confused soul. He was an ego maniac. He flaunted and disobeyed the laws of the Aqdas and created all this confusion himself."

These ideas came as a surprise to Remey's small band of followers, and nearly all of them abandoned him. They were not organized until several of them began forming their own groups based on different understandings of succession, even before his death in 1974. The majority of them claimed that Remey was showing signs of senility. The number of people who recognized his claim had greatly diminished by the time of his death.

=== Burial ===
From 1962, Remey resided in Florence, Italy, and died there on 4 February 1974, at the age of 99. Having been abandoned by all of his followers, he was buried by his non-Baháʼí secretary without religious ceremony in Florence. His obituary in the Washington Star accidentally gave his name as George Mason Remey.

== Resultant groups ==
Remey's claim to Guardianship resulted in the largest schism in the history of the religion, and several small groups continue the belief that Remey was the Guardian and successor to Shoghi Effendi. They are now largely confined to the United States, with few members and no communal religious life. Accurate estimates on size are scarce and dated.

=== Joel Marangella ===
In 1961 Joel Marangella (1918–2013) received a letter from Remey, and a note that, "...in or after 1963. You will know when to break the seal." In 1964 Remey appointed members to a second International Baháʼí Council with Marangella as president, significant due to Remey's claim to Guardianship being based on the same appointment. In 1965 Remey activated the council, and in 1966 wrote letters passing the "affairs of the Faith" to the council, then later dissolving it. In 1969 Marangella made an announcement that the letter of 1961 was Remey's appointment of him as the third Guardian, and that he had been the Guardian since 1964, invalidating Remey's pronouncements from that point forward.

Marangella gained the support of most of Remey's followers, who came to be known as Orthodox Baháʼís. One source estimated them at no more than 100 members in 1988, with the largest concentration being 11 in Roswell, New Mexico. In a 2007 court case, the group claimed a United States membership of about 40 people.

=== Donald Harvey ===
Donald Harvey was appointed by Remey as "Third Guardian" in 1967, and the first of five "elders", but he later dissolved the body of elders. Donald Harvey never gained much of a following. When Harvey died in 1991, leadership went to Jacques Soghomonian, and when he died in 2013 it passed to E.S. Yazdani.

=== Leland Jensen ===
Leland Jensen was initially a supporter of Remey and then left the group. After a stint in prison for sexually molesting a minor, he made several religious claims of his own and established himself as the head of an apocalyptic cult. He believed that Remey was the adopted son of ʻAbdu'l-Bahá, and that Remey's adopted son Joseph Pepe was the third Guardian, something that Pepe refused to entertain. Jensen made headlines for predicting a nuclear holocaust in 1980, and his followers became the subject of academic studies in cognitive dissonance. Membership peaked in 1980 with 150–200, but declined after the failed prophecy of 1980. By 1990 there were fewer than 100 adherents, and defection continued in the 1990s and beyond. They were concentrated in Montana.

=== Rex King ===
Rex King was elected to Remey's NSA of the United States with the most votes, and soon came into conflict with Remey. In 1969 he traveled to Italy with the hope of having Remey pass affairs over to him, but instead was labeled with the "station of satan". King supported Marangella's claim, but soon took issue with the way Marangella was interpreting scripture. King rejected all claimants to the Guardianship after Shoghi Effendi including Remey. He claimed that he, Rex King, was a "regent" pending the emergence of the second Guardian who was in "occultation". Hardly any of Remey's supporters followed King. He called the group the "Orthodox Baháʼí Faith under the Regency" and held at least three annual conferences in the 1970s. King died in 1977 and left a will appointing his three sons and a daughter-in-law as a council of regents, who changed their name to "Tarbiyat Baha'i Community". They were concentrated in New Mexico.

== Works ==
Remey wrote several pamphlets that were among the first available to Americans:

- Unity: The Revelation of Baha 'Ullah (February 1905).
- The Revelation of Baha 'Ullah (June 1906).
- Remey, Charles Mason (October 1908). The message of unity: the Bahai movement. Washington: publisher not identified. OCLC 55770252.
- The Bahai Movement – A Teaching of Peace (May 1911).
- Remey, Charles Mason (March 1912). The Bahai movement for universal religion, brotherhood and peace: a sketch of its history and teaching. Washington: Persian American Bulletin. OCLC 903917038.
- The Covenant (November 1912).
- Some Vital Bahai Principles (1917?).

He also published two books about his travels:

- Remey, Charles Mason (1909). Observations of a Bahai traveller, 1908. Washington: The Carnahan Press.
- Remey, Charles Mason (1914). Observations of a Bahai traveller, 1908. Washington, D.C.: Press of J.D. Milans and Sons.

Remey was a prolific writer. The following are a few examples of other material he produced.

- Remey, Charles Mason; Saba, Mahmoud (1912). The Bahai movement: a series of nineteen papers. Washington D.C: J. D. Milans & Sons. OCLC 71010909.
- Remey, Charles Mason (1916). Five preliminary architectural sketches for the temple of the Mashrak-el-Azkar, which the followers of the Bahai movement are to build upon the shore of Lake Michigan at Chicago. Washington. OCLC 2707886.
- Remey, Charles Mason (1917). Bahai teaching quotations from the Bahai sacred writings and several articles upon the history and aims of the teaching. Washington, D.C. ISBN 978-0-524-02038-8. OCLC 613223377.
- Remey, Charles Mason (1919). The Bahai rerelation and reconstruction. Chicago: Bahai Publishing Society. OCLC 1041074769.
- Remey, Charles Mason (1925). A Series of twelve articles introductory to the study of the Bahá'i teachings treating briefly of the Revelation of Bahà'u'llàh ... by Charles Mason Remey. Firenze: Tip. Sordomuti. OCLC 457694196.
- Remey, Charles Mason (1925). The universal consciousness of the Bahá'í revelation: a brief treatise introductory to the study of the Bahá'i Religion. Firenze. OCLC 174715526.
- Remey, Charles Mason (1929). The national church and shrine of the United States of America to be built in the city of Washington the general design of the edifice, the organization of the foundation, outline of the plan of the work: a call to the builders, endowers and founders. Washington, D.C. OCLC 600045601.
- Remey, Charles Mason (1943). Reminiscences of his childhood: 1874–1884. His Remey family records; no. 8. Vol. Four volumes. Jamestown, Rhode Island: [Jamestown, R.I.
- Remey, Charles Mason (1949). Journal diary of Baháʼi travels in Europe, 1947. Washington. OCLC 47997958.
- Remey, Charles Mason (1949). Journal diary of a Baháʼí teacher in Latin America, 1946–1947. Washington. OCLC 47997946.
- Remey, Charles Mason (1949). Journal-diary of European Baháʼí travels, April–November, 1948. Washington. OCLC 47997979.
- Remey, Charles Mason (1949). A teacher of the Baháʼí faith in South America, 1945–1946. Washington. OCLC 47997923.
- Remey, Charles Mason (1960). Daily observations of the Baha'i faith: made to the Hands of the Faith in the Holy Land. Washington, D.C.: Self-published. OCLC 233997461.
