= John C. Watson (admiral) =

United States admiral (1842–1923)

John Crittenden Watson
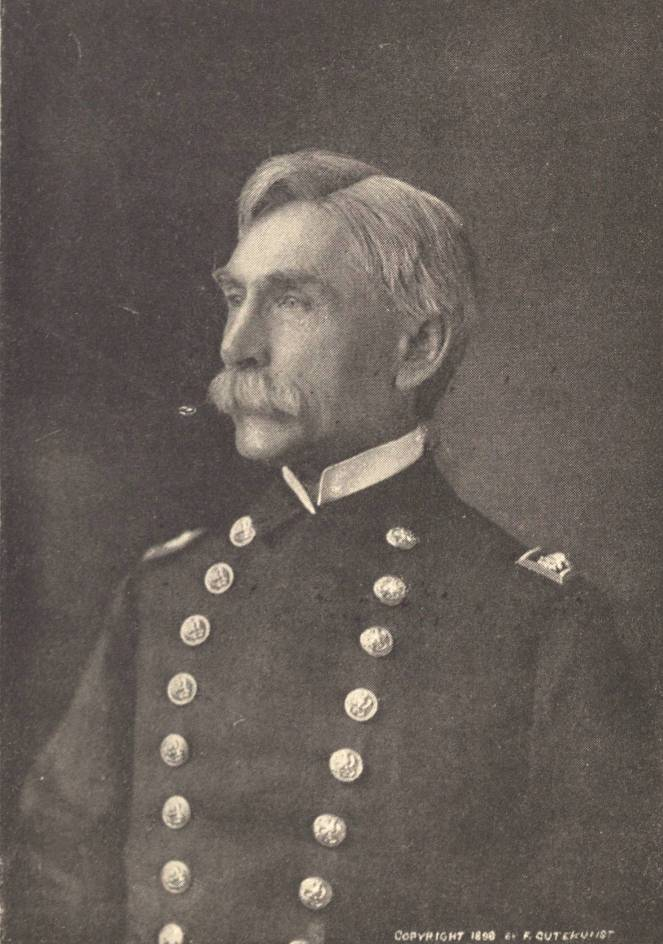
- Rear-Admiral John C. Watson in 1898
- Born: 24 August 1842; Frankfort, Kentucky
- Died: 14 December 1923 (aged 81); Washington, D.C.
- Burial place: Arlington National Cemetery
- Military career
- Allegiance: United States of America
- Branch: United States Navy
- Service years: 1860–1904
- Rank: Rear Admiral
- Commands: USS Wyoming; Governor of the Naval Home at Philadelphia, Pennsylvania; U.S. Eastern Fleet; U.S. Asiatic Fleet
- Conflicts: American Civil War: Battle of Mobile Bay; Spanish–American War: Battle of Santiago de Cuba

John Crittenden Watson (24 August 1842 – 14 December 1923) was an admiral of the United States Navy.

== Biography ==
Watson was born in Frankfort, Kentucky, on 24 August 1842, the grandson of Kentucky politician John J. Crittenden. He graduated from the United States Naval Academy on 15 June 1860. After tours in Susquehanna and Richmond, Watson was promoted to master on 19 September 1861 and joined Sabine. He distinguished himself in this ship when she went to the aid of the chartered government transport Governor off the coast of South Carolina on the night of 2–3 November 1861. Watson managed the cables and hawsers which held the two ships together in spite of a violent gale, allowing some 500 men—Marines and crew—to clamber from the foundering Governor to safety in Sabine. His commanding officer, Captain Cadwalader Ringgold, praised Watson for his "indefatigable exertions" and "utmost skill and efficiency" in keeping the two ships lashed together.

Promoted to lieutenant in July 1862, Watson later served as flag lieutenant to Rear Admiral David Farragut, who flew his flag in the steam sloop Hartford, and participated in the Battle of Mobile Bay. He was later wounded by a shell fragment during an engagement with a Confederate battery at Warrington, Florida.

After the war, Watson became a companion of the District of Columbia Commandery of the Military Order of the Loyal Legion of the United States, a military society of officers who had served in the Union armed forces during the Civil War.

Watson served in a number of sea and shore billets into the 1880s, including duty as executive officer of the steam sloop Alaska; the post of inspector of ordnance at the Mare Island Navy Yard, Vallejo, California; command of Wyoming when that warship carried the American exhibit to the Paris Exposition of 1878; and governor of the Naval Home at Philadelphia, Pennsylvania.

As a commodore, he hoisted his broad pennant in Newark (Cruiser No. 1) as Commander, Eastern Fleet, on 10 June 1898, shifting later to Oregon (Battleship No. 3). The battleship served as his flagship during the subsequent Battle of Santiago, Cuba, on 3 July 1898, in which the Spanish squadron under Admiral Pascual Cervera was destroyed.

In 1898 he became a veteran companion of the Military Order of Foreign Wars.

Promoted to rear admiral in 1899, Watson served as Commander in Chief, Asiatic Fleet, from 20 June 1899 to 18 April 1900, when he was succeeded by Rear Admiral George C. Remey at Yokohama, Japan. He returned to the United States aboard Baltimore (Cruiser No. 3) by way of the Suez Canal and Mediterranean Sea to serve as President of the Naval Examining Board. Watson represented the United States at the coronation of King Edward VII of the United Kingdom in 1902.

Placed on the retired list in 1904, Rear Admiral Watson lived in retirement with his wife Elizabeth Anderson Thornton, with whom he had three boys, until he died at Washington, D.C., on 14 December 1923. He was interred at Arlington National Cemetery beside his wife, who had died the previous year.

== Namesake ==
During World War II, the U.S. Navy planned to name a destroyer, USS Watson (DD-482), in honor of Rear Admiral Watson. However, due to more pressing wartime destroyer construction programs, the ship was never laid down, and her construction was canceled on 7 January 1946.

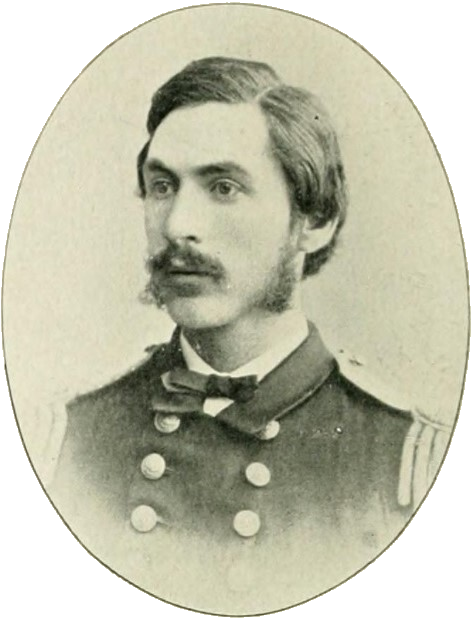
As a captain circa 1892

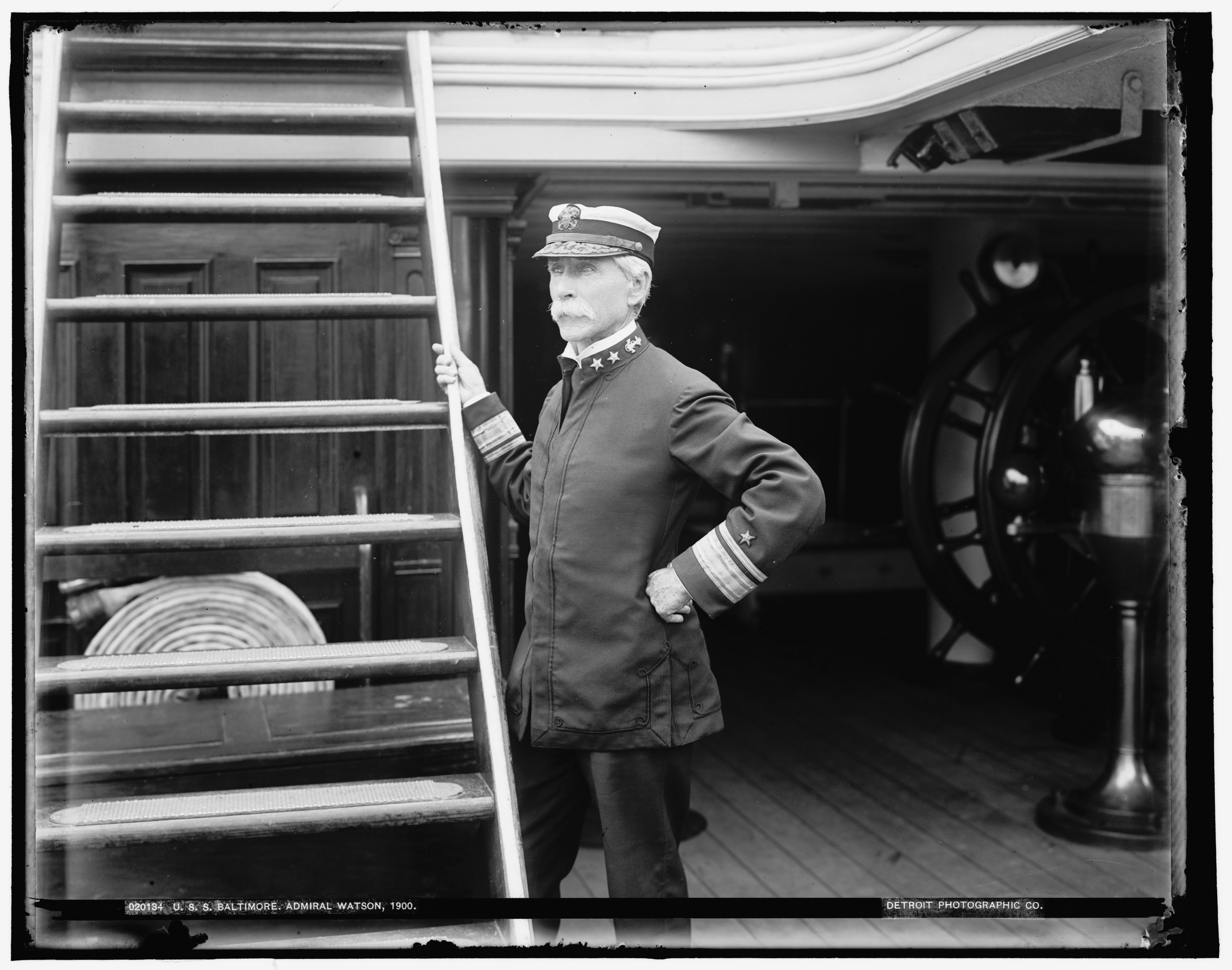
Aboard USS Baltimore
in 1900

== See also ==
Military offices
Preceded by George Dewey	Commander, Asiatic Squadron; 5 June 1899 – 19 April 1900	Succeeded by George C. Remey
