= USS Watson =

Fletcher-class destroyer

History

United States
- Name: USS Watson
- Namesake: Rear Admiral John Crittenden Watson (1842–1923)
- Builder: Federal Shipbuilding and Drydock Company, Kearny, New Jersey (proposed)
- Fate: Construction contract cancelled 7 January 1946

General characteristics
- Class & type: Fletcher-class destroyer
- Displacement: 2,325 tons (standard); 2,924 tons (full load)
- Length: 369 ft 1 in (112.50 m) waterline; 376 ft 5 in (114.73 m) oa
- Beam: 39 ft 7 in (12.07 m)
- Draft: 13 ft 9 in (4.19 m) (full load)
- Propulsion: Experimental diesel system, 2 shafts
- Speed: 35 knots (65 km/h; 40 mph)
- Range: 6,500 nmi (12,000 km) at 15 kt
- Complement: 70
- Armament: 5 × 5 inch (127 mm)/38 caliber guns; 1 × quad 1.1-inch (28 mm) autocannon mount; 4 × 20 mm guns; 10 × 21 inch (533 mm) torpedo tubes
- Armor: Side: 0.75 inch (19 mm); Deck over machinery: 0.5 inch (12.7 mm)

USS Watson (DD-482) was a United States Navy destroyer which was never laid down, her construction contract being cancelled in 1946.

Watson was planned as a modified Fletcher-class destroyer to be built by the Federal Shipbuilding and Drydock Company at Kearny, New Jersey. She was to be powered by an experimental diesel propulsion system. However, due to more pressing World War II destroyer construction programs, Watson was never laid down, and her construction contract was ultimately cancelled on 7 January 1946.
