= George C. Remey =

United States Navy admiral (1841–1928)

George Collier Remey
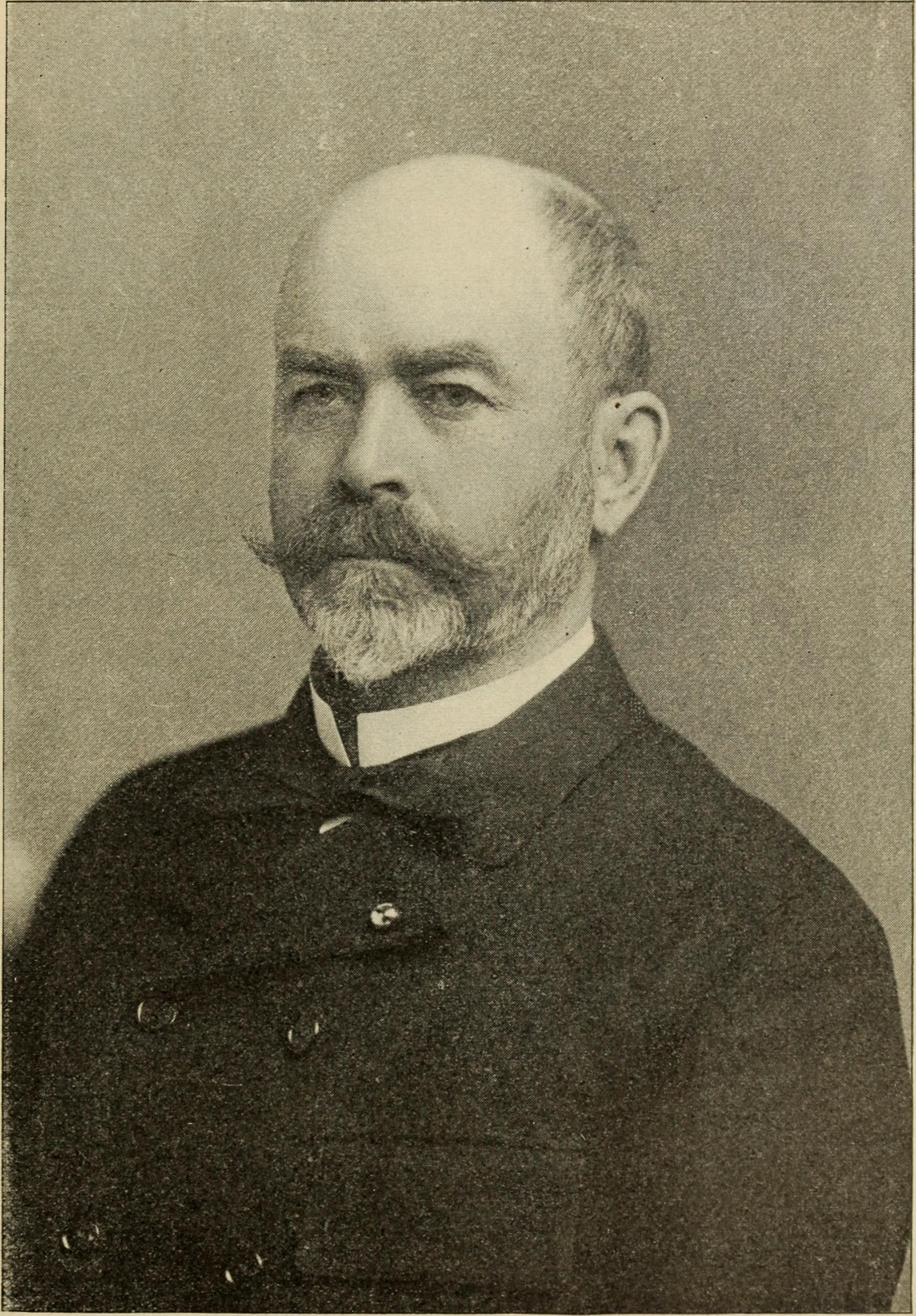
- Born: August 10, 1841; Burlington, Iowa, U.S.
- Died: February 10, 1928 (aged 86); Washington, D.C., U.S.
- Burial place: Arlington National Cemetery
- Education: U.S. Naval Academy
- Spouse: Mary Josephine Mason (m. 1873)
- Children: Mason Remey
- Relatives: William Butler Remey (brother)
- Military career
- Allegiance: United States
- Branch: United States Navy
- Service years: 1859–1903
- Rank: Rear admiral
- Commands: Marblehead; Enterprise; Charleston; Asiatic Squadron
- Conflicts: American Civil War; Spanish–American War

Signature
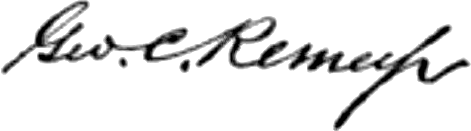

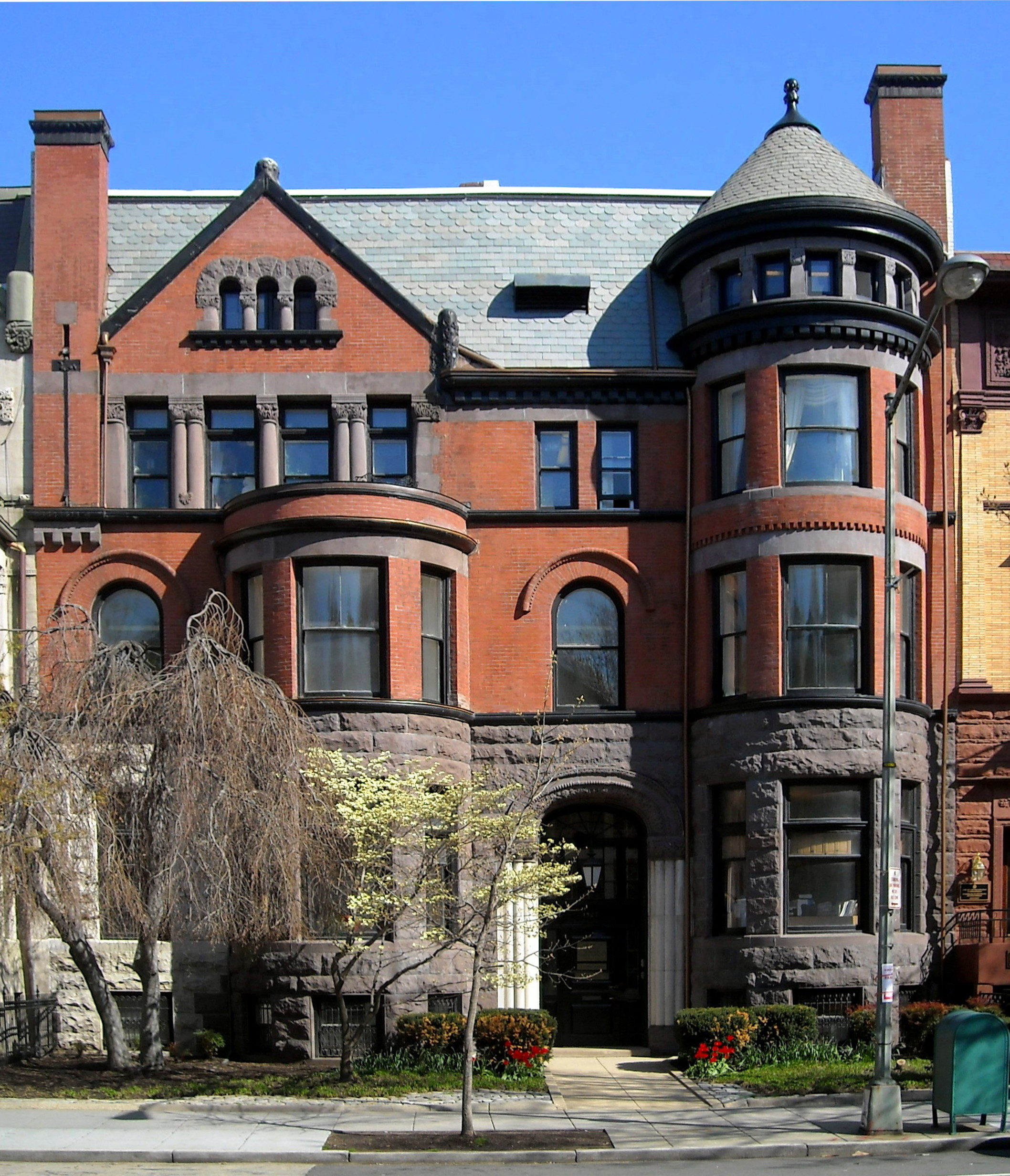
Former residence of George C. Remey located in the Dupont Circle neighborhood of Washington, D.C.

George Collier Remey (August 10, 1841 – February 10, 1928) was a rear admiral of the United States Navy, serving in the Civil War and the Spanish–American War.

== Early life ==
George Collier Remey was born at Burlington, Iowa, on August 10, 1841, to Eliza Smith (née Howland) and William Butler Remey. He was a descendant of John Howland, who was a passenger on the Mayflower when it arrived in Plymouth in 1620. His father was captain of a steamboat in Burlington. He graduated from the United States Naval Academy in 1859.

== Career ==
Initially assigned to the sloop USS Hartford on the Asiatic Station, he returned to the United States with the outbreak of the Civil War and served in the gunboat Marblehead during the Peninsular Campaign, March–July 1862; and, afterward, in the blockade of Charleston. In April 1863, he assumed duties as Executive Officer in the screw sloop Canandaigua and during attacks on Fort Wagner briefly commanded Marblehead. From August 23 to September 7, he commanded a battery of naval guns on Morris Island, and on the night of September 7–8, led the second division of a boat attack on Fort Sumter. The division made shore, but was smashed by gunfire. Remey and the surviving members of his party were forced to surrender. Following 13 months of imprisonment at Columbia, S.C., Remey was exchanged and returned to duty, serving in the sidewheel steamship De Soto until the end of the war.

In 1866, he saw service off the west coast of South America. In 1870–71, he participated in the Tehuantepec Survey Expedition. After commanding the screw sloop Enterprise and service in the Mediterranean, he was appointed captain in 1885. Four years later he assumed command of the protected cruiser Charleston, flagship of the Pacific Squadron.

Commandant of the Portsmouth Navy Yard at the outbreak of the Spanish–American War, he was ordered to take charge of the Naval Base Key West, whence he directed the supply and repair of all naval forces in Cuban waters and organized supply lines to Army forces in Cuba. After peace returned, Rear Admiral Remey resumed duties at the Portsmouth Navy Yard. In April 1900, he assumed command of the Asiatic Station and for the next two years guided the ships of that station through the diplomatic and military chaos that was China.

Remey then returned to the United States and served for a year as Chairman of the Lighthouse Board before retiring on August 10, 1903.

== Personal life ==
Remey married Mary Josephine Mason, daughter of Iowa Chief Justice Charles Mason, on July 8, 1873. Their son was Mason Remey. He had two brothers, William Butler Remey, who served as Judge Advocate General of the Navy and Edward Wallace Remey, who also served in the navy.

Remey was a member of the Military Order of the Loyal Legion of the United States, Military Order of Foreign Wars, Military Order of the Dragon and the Imperial Order of the Dragon.

Rear Admiral Remey died at Washington, D.C., on February 10, 1928.

== Awards ==
- Civil War Campaign Medal
- Spanish Campaign Medal
- China Relief Expedition Medal
- Philippine Campaign Medal

== Namesake ==
In 1943, the destroyer USS Remey (DD-688) was named in his honor.

== Gallery ==
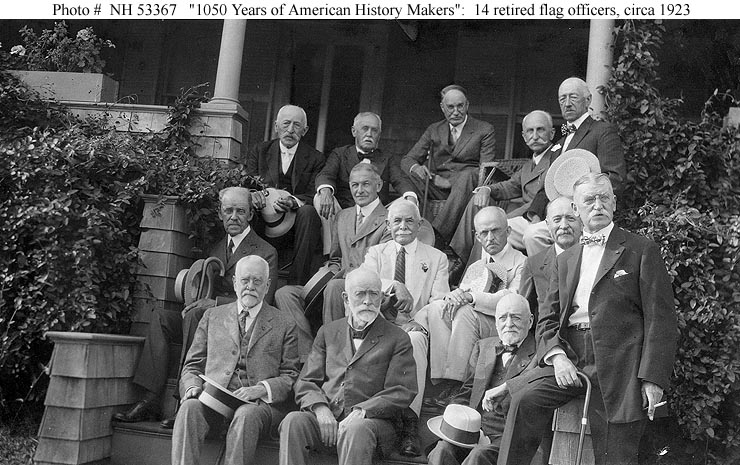
Remey is second from left in the front row in this photograph of 13 retired U.S. Navy and U.S. Marine Corps flag officers taken c. 1923.

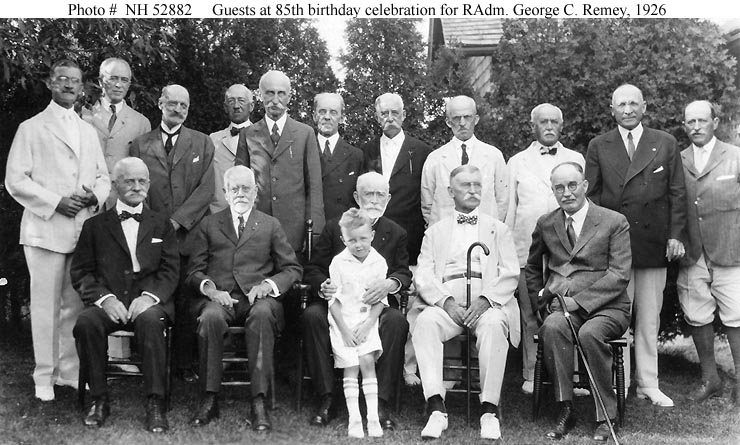
Remey is seated second from left in this photo of retired flag officers taken at his 85th birthday party on August 10, 1926.

Military offices
Preceded by John C. Watson	Commander, Asiatic Squadron; April 19, 1900 – March 1, 1902	Succeeded by Frederick Rodgers
