= USS Remey =

Fletcher-class destroyer

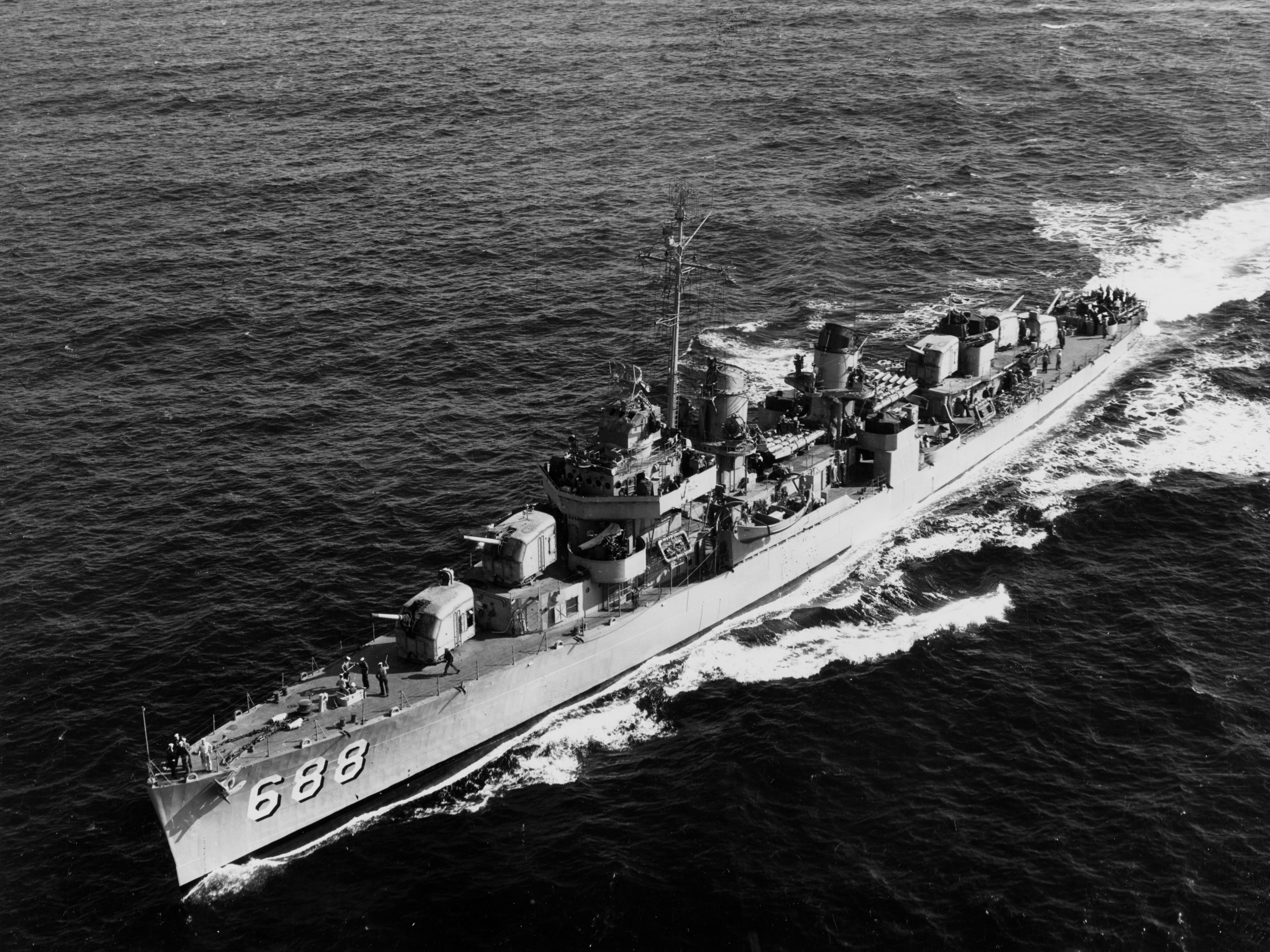
- USS Remey (DD-688), at sea, c. 1951

History

United States
- Name: Remey
- Namesake: George C. Remey
- Builder: Bath Iron Works
- Laid down: 22 March 1943
- Launched: 25 July 1943
- Commissioned: 30 September 1943
- Decommissioned: 30 December 1963
- Stricken: 1 December 1974
- Fate: Sold for scrap, 10 June 1976

General characteristics
- Class & type: Fletcher-class destroyer
- Displacement: 2,050 tons
- Length: 376.4 ft (114.7 m)
- Beam: 39.6 ft (12.1 m)
- Draft: 13.8 ft (4.2 m)
- Propulsion: 60,000 shp (45,000 kW); geared turbines; 2 propellers
- Speed: 38 knots (70 km/h; 44 mph)
- Range: 6,500 nautical miles (12,000 km; 7,500 mi) at 15 knots (28 km/h; 17 mph)
- Complement: 329
- Armament: 5 × 5 in (130 mm)/38 cal guns, 10 × 40 mm AA guns, 7 × 20 mm AA guns, 10 × 21 inch (533 mm) torpedo tubes, 6 × depth charge projectors, 2 × depth charge tracks

USS Remey (DD-688) was a Fletcher-class destroyer of the United States Navy, named for Rear Admiral George C. Remey (1841–1928).

Remey was laid down on 22 March 1943 by the Bath Iron Works Corp., Bath, Maine; launched on 25 July 1943; sponsored by Miss Angelica G. Remey, daughter of Rear Admiral Remey; and commissioned on 30 September 1943.

== Service history ==
=== World War II ===
Remey departed Boston 5 December 1943 as flagship of Destroyer Squadron 54 (DesRon 54), and headed for the Pacific. Escorting heavier ships en route, she transited the Panama Canal at mid-month and arrived at San Diego, California to report for duty in the 5th Amphibious Force on the 20th.

==== Marshall Islands ====
Training with the 4th Marine Division followed, and on 13 January 1944, she sailed west, screening Task Force 53 (TF 53), the Northern Attack Force for the invasion of the Marshalls. From 29 January, when Wotje was bombarded, until 5 February, when Remey struck an uncharted reef, she screened the transports and Carrier Division 22 (CarDiv 22) and provided gunfire support for the troops fighting for Kwajalein. On the 6th, she got underway for Majuro, thence proceeded to Pearl Harbor for repairs.

==== Mariana Islands ====
Following repairs, Remey completed an escort run for the USS Intrepid (CV-11) to San Francisco and back, then screened Bataan to Majuro. There, from 9 to 29 April 1944, she escorted submarines in and out of the area. Returning to Pearl Harbor on 4 May, she escorted aircraft carriers on exercises in Hawaiian waters and on the 31st got underway for the Mariana Islands. Stopping en route at Kwajalein, she arrived off Saipan on 14 June and with Fire Support Unit I commenced firing on the island. Closing to 4,000 yards (3,700 m), Remey was straddled by shore battery fire, but her return fire destroyed two of the offending batteries. The next morning, while screening Tennessee off Tinian, she destroyed three more guns. In the afternoon, she shelled Saipan and throughout that day and the next continued counterbattery fire. On 17 June, she provided gunfire support for the troops on Saipan, then on 18 June returned to the battleships and remained with them through the aerial attacks of the Battle of the Philippine Sea. On 22 June, she resumed shore bombardment duties and shelled enemy troop concentrations and supply dumps. Through June–July, she remained in the area, continuing her support for operations on Saipan and extending it to ground forces fighting on Tinian after 24 July.

On 8 August, the destroyer got underway for the Marshall Islands, thence steamed to the Solomon Islands where TF 32 rehearsed for the assault on the Palau Islands. A month later, she sailed for those islands. Arriving on 15 August, she bombarded Babelthuap, then on 16–17 August showered her shells on Angaur. On 23 August, she sailed south and on 27 August anchored in Seeadler Harbor to prepare for the invasion of the Philippines.

==== Philippines ====
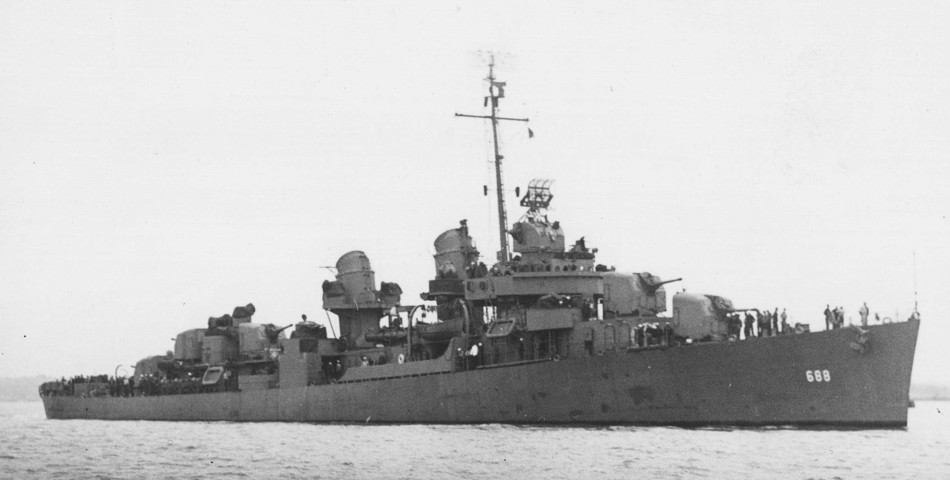
USS Remey in World War II.

Departing for Leyte on 11 October 1944, Remey passed the northern tip of Dinagat Island on the night of 19/20 October. In the morning, she screened her charges, landing craft, to the assault area, then took up station in lower Surigao Strait. Through the 24th, she continued her anti-small boat and antiaircraft patrols, then prepared to meet an enemy surface force reported standing toward the southern entrance to Surigao Strait.

Rear Admiral Jesse B. Oldendorf deployed his force of cruisers, battleships, and destroyers for what was to be the last engagement of a battleline. Captain Jesse B. Coward, Commander, DesRon 54, divided his squadron into eastern and western groups to launch torpedo attacks against the Japanese as they steamed through the Strait toward defeat under the guns of the battleline.

Reports from the PT boats shadowing the Japanese were slow in coming, but at 0211 on 25 October, Remey, leading the eastern attack unit, moved south. McGowan and Melvin followed in attack disposition. At about 0235, radar contact was established. The attackers, despite navigational difficulties, began to close on their targets. Just before 0300, Remey was illuminated briefly by an enemy searchlight. At 0300, the three destroyers of the eastern group fired their torpedoes, launching 27 "fish" in less than 2 minutes. Powder flashes on two of her torpedoes showed Remey's position and again she was spotlighted. Straddled by 6 inch shells, she commenced making more smoke and weaving through it to make her way back up the Dinagat coast to the post-attack rendezvous point off Hibuson Island, whence the force witnessed the battleline's barrage.

The next day Remey retired from Leyte Gulf. On the 30th, she anchored in Humboldt Bay. During November, she escorted reinforcements to Leyte, and in December joined CarDiv 22 for operations in the Sulu Sea in support of the landings on Mindoro. Back in the New Guinea-Admiralty Islands area at the end of the month, she departed Manus Island on 2 January 1945, and on the 11th arrived off Luzon with reinforcements for the assault forces landed on the Lingayen beaches 2 days earlier. She departed on the 15th, and 8 days later arrived at Ulithi where she joined the Fast Carrier Task Force (then 5th Fleet's TF 58, later 3rd Fleet's TF 38).

==== Bombardment of Japan ====
On 10 February 1945, she sortied with Task Group 58.5 (TG 58.5) and, steaming north, screened that group as its planes flew night fighter cover for the task force and conducted night harassment strikes against the enemy in the Tokyo area and then over Iwo Jima. Remey supported operations in the Volcano and Bonin Islands until 9 March, then got underway for Ulithi and a 2-day rest. On the 14th, she screened the sortie of TG 58.4, then sailed with that group as it struck enemy installations, shipping and troop concentrations on and around Kyūshū and the Ryūkyū Islands. On 1 April, the group covered the assault on Okinawa's Hagushi beaches, then remained in the area until 11 May as ground forces pushed across Japan's last bastion protecting her home islands. Replenished at Ulithi, the ships, now designated TG 38.4, were back off Okinawa before the end of the month. On 8 June, Remey joined TG 30.4 for the bombardment of Okino Daito, returned to TG 38.4 the next day, retiring to Leyte on the 11th.

By 1 July, the carriers were again ready to strike at the Japanese home islands. On the 10th sorties were flown against Tokyo and, on the 13th-14th, against northern Honshū and Hokkaidō. On the night of 14/15 July, Remey participated in the bombardment of Muroran. On the 16th, she screened the carriers as further strikes were launched against Honshū, then returned to the bombardment group as it shelled Hitachi. On the 18th, she rejoined TG 38.4, then shifted to TG 38.3 for screening duties as planes were sent against Shikoku and Kyūshū, concentrating on Kobe, 20th-22nd. Further strikes against the southern islands followed, but by 30 July, the Tokyo and Nagoya areas were again the targets. Weather conditions, including a typhoon, delayed further offensive action until 9 August, when Honshū was again hit.

Detached the following day, Remey, with others of her squadron, proceeded to the Kuril Islands where she joined TF 92 in an anti-shipping sweep in the Sea of Okhotsk on the 11th, then headed for Adak Island en route to a shipyard overhaul on the west coast. At Adak on the 14th, she received word of the Japanese surrender and orders to rejoin TF 92 for occupation duty in the Ominato area. Departing the Aleutian Islands at the end of August, she remained in Japanese waters until 15 September when she got underway for San Francisco.

Arriving on 1 October 1945, she shifted to San Diego in December. In commission, in reserve from January, Remey decommissioned on 10 December 1946 and was berthed at San Diego until ordered activated with the outbreak of hostilities in Korea.

=== Post-War ===
Recommissioned on 14 November 1951, Remey departed the west coast on 15 February 1952 and on the 28th reported for duty with the Atlantic Fleet. Homeported at Newport, she added strength to the 2nd Fleet as it sent destroyers to the Far East to support U.N. Forces in Korea. For the next year and a half, Remey operated in the western Atlantic and in the Caribbean. Then, in the fall (September–December) of 1953, deployed briefly to European waters for joint operations with the Royal Navy followed by 6th Fleet exercises in the Mediterranean. Six months after her return to Newport, she sailed for the western Pacific and summer operations with the 7th Fleet. Between June and September, she ranged from Korea and Japan to the Philippines and departed the latter for Suez 24 September, completing her round-the-world cruise on 28 November.

Remey remained in the western Atlantic through 1955 and, in the spring of 1956, as tension in the eastern Mediterranean from Cyprus to Suez, again heightened, rejoined the 6th Fleet. From 31 March to 12 May, as British troops prepared to withdraw from Suez, she cruised the Red Sea-Persian Gulf areas. Then, at the end of the month, the destroyer returned to Newport for 5 months of type training and ASW evaluation exercises. In July, Egypt nationalized the Suez Canal. By the end of the month, financial retaliations had been imposed by western Europe. Despite various peace plans proposed in August and September, war broke out in late October. To the north, civil unrest continued in Cyprus, flared in Poland, and flamed through Hungary. On 6 November, Remey steamed back to the Mediterranean to assume patrol duties which continued until after Israeli forces withdrew from the Sinai Peninsula in late January 1957.

Through the spring of 1958, Remey remained on the east coast. During the summer, she conducted exercises in the North Atlantic and the North Sea. Returning in August, she participated in further ASW evaluation tests, then, in October, assumed duties as schoolship for the Destroyer Force's Afloat Engineering School.

Detached at the end of the year, Remey shifted her homeport to New York City and commenced duty as flagship of Reserve Escort Squadron 2 (later, Reserve Destroyer Squadron 2). A unit of the Selected Reserve antisubmarine program, her crew was recalled to active duty and she rejoined the active fleet, assigned to Destroyer Division 201, after the closing of the East and West Berlin border in mid-August 1961. During December of that year and January 1962, she cruised in the North Sea, returning to Newport in February and resuming reserve training duties at New York in August. In September 1963, she steamed to Philadelphia where the ship was decommissioned on 30 December 1963, and was berthed as a unit of the Atlantic Reserve Fleet.

Remey was stricken from the Naval Vessel Register on 1 December 1974. She was sold on 10 June 1976 and broken up for scrap.

== Awards ==
Remey earned 10 battle stars during World War II.
