= William Butler Remey =

American military officer

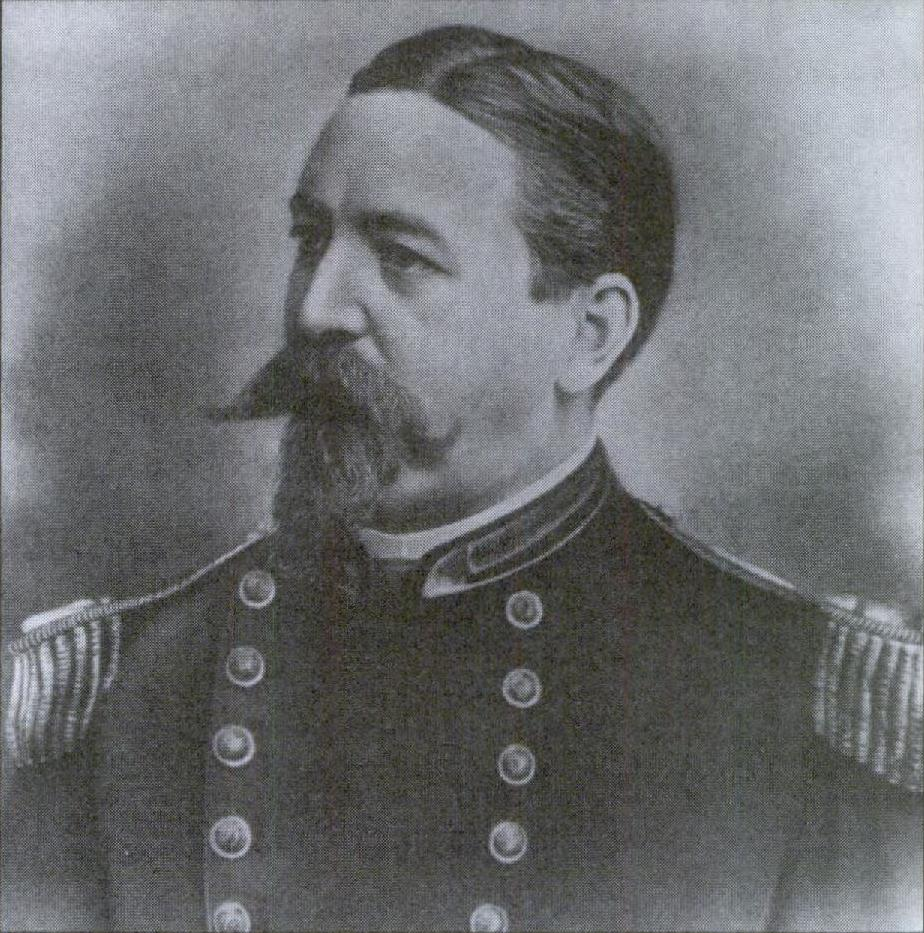

Judge Advocate General of the Navy
- In office June 9, 1880 – June 4, 1892
- Preceded by: Position established
- Succeeded by: Samuel Conrad Lemly

Personal details
- Born: 1842 Burlington, Iowa, U.S.
- Died: January 20, 1895 (aged 52–53) Somerville, Massachusetts, U.S.
- Resting place: Aspen Grove Cemetery; Burlington, Iowa, U.S.
- Relatives: George C. Remey (brother)
- Military career
- Allegiance: United States
- Branch: U.S. Marine Corps
- Service years: 1861–1892
- Rank: Colonel
- Conflicts: American Civil War

William Butler Remey (1842 – January 20, 1895) was an American military officer who served in the American Civil War and was the first Judge Advocate General of the Navy, serving from 1880 to 1892.

== Early life ==
William Butler Remey was born in 1842, in Burlington, Iowa, to Eliza Smith (née Howland) and William Butler Remey. His father was captain of a steamboat in Burlington. He had two brothers, George C. Remey, who served in the Navy, and John T. Remey, president of the National State Bank in Burlington.

== Career ==
Remey became a captain of a Burlington militia company known as the Zouave Light Guards, who organized in 1861. In 1861, Remey was appointed by Senator Grimes as a second lieutenant in the U.S. Marine Corps. From 1862 to 1863, he served on USS Sabine, a sailing frigate. He was promoted to first lieutenant around 1864 and served in the Norfolk Naval Shipyard from 1864 to 1865. He served on the USS North Carolina in 1865 and USS Vanderbilt from 1865 to 1867 and the USS New Hampshire in 1868. In 1869, he worked at the Marine Barracks in Philadelphia and as an instructor in army signals in Washington, D.C., between 1869 and 1870. He remained on duty at headquarters in Washington, D.C., from 1870 to 1871. In 1873, he was commissioned captain and took over command of the USS Colorado, serving there from 1873 to 1875. In 1875, he was detailed as fleet marine officer of the South Pacific Station. In 1876, he was assigned fleet marine officer of the North Atlantic Station.

In 1877, Remey was assigned to the Norfolk Naval Shipyard where he remained until 1880. On June 9, 1880, he was made colonel and the first Judge Advocate General of the Navy. He served in this role until his retirement on June 9, 1892, after reports of ill health surfaced.

== Personal life ==
Remey was a companion of the District of Columbia Commandery of the Military Order of the Loyal Legion of the United States, a military society of Union military officers and their descendants.

Remey died on January 20, 1895, in Somerville, Massachusetts. He was buried at Aspen Grove Cemetery in Burlington, Iowa.
