= Azadi =

Azadi means freedom or liberty in Persian and other languages. It may refer to:

== Places ==
=== Iran ===
- Azadi, Andimeshk, a city in Khuzestan province
- Azadi, Dasht-e Azadegan, a village in Khuzestan province
- Azadi, Kohgiluyeh and Boyer-Ahmad
- Azadi, Lorestan
- Azadi Cinema, Tehran, Iran; the largest movie theater (cinema) in the Middle East
- Azadi Sport Complex, a sports complex in Tehran, Iran. built for the 1974 Asian Games
  - Azadi Stadium, Iran's national and largest stadium with a capacity of 100,000
  - Azadi Indoor Stadium
  - Azadi Basketball Hall
  - Azadi Volleyball Hall
- Azadi Station, a metro station in Tehran, Iran
- Azadi Street, a street in Tehran, Iran
- Azadi Square, the largest square in Tehran
- Azadi Tower, one of the two symbols of Tehran, Iran
- Parsian Azadi Hotel, 4-star hotel and one of the largest hotels in Iran. located in Tehran

== Arts and entertainment ==
=== Films ===
- Azadi (2005 film), an Australian short film by Anthony Maras
- Azadi (2025 film), an Indian Malayalam-language film by Jo George

=== Television ===
- Ryder Azadi, the former governor of the fictional planet Lothal in the animated TV series Star Wars Rebels
- Simaye Azadi, a satellite television channel covering issues relating to Iran

=== Music ===
- Azadi (album), fourth studio album by the Pakistani band Junoon
  - Azadi (song), from the album Andaz by Junoon
- "Azadi", a song with music by Sanjay Leela Bhansali from his 2024 Indian TV series Heeramandi

=== Video games ===
- Azadi Empire, a fictional state in the 2006 video game Dreamfall

=== Organizations ===
- Azadî, Kurdish organization
- Gano Azadi League, political party in Bangladesh

== Others ==
- The Azadi, a newspaper published in Chittagong, Bangladesh
- Youm-e-Azadi, Independence Day of Pakistan

== See also ==
- Azad (disambiguation)
- Azaad (disambiguation)
