= Azad =

Azad may refer to:

== People ==
=== Mononym ===
- Azad (fl. 345), a eunuch and a companion in martyrdom of Simeon Barsabae
- Azad (Maoist) (1952–2010), alias Cherukuri Rajkumar, Spokesperson and Central Politburo member of the Communist Party of India
- Azad (rapper) (born 1974), German rapper of Iranian-Kurdish descent (formerly a member of Asiatic Warriors)

=== Given name ===
- Abul Kalam Azad (disambiguation), refers to multiple people
- Azad Khan Afghan (died 1781), Pashtun military leader
- Rafiq Azad (1941–2016), Bangladeshi poet
- Magfar Ahmed Chowdhury (Azad) (1946–1971), freedom fighter
- Lutfor Rahman Khan (Azad) (born 1957), Bangladeshi state minister
- Azad Abul Kalam (born 1966), Bangladeshi actor, director, writer and activist
- Azad Zaman (1973/4–2021), Bengali politician in Meghalaya
- Azad Safarov (born 1985/6), Ukrainian journalist and filmmaker
- Azad Ali, British Islamist
- AK Azad Khan, Bangladeshi physician and social worker
- Azad Rahman Shakil, Bangladeshi film actor

=== Surname ===
- Muhammad Husain Azad (1830–1910), Indian poet
- Chandra Shekhar Azad (1906–1931), Indian freedom-fighter
- Abdus Samad Azad (1922–2005), Bangladeshi minister and freedom fighter
- Alauddin Al-Azad (1932–2009), Bangladeshi author, novelist, and poet
- Mahmoud Mosharraf Azad Tehrani (1934–2006), Iranian poet
- M. Nazim Uddin Al Azad (born 1946), Bangladeshi minister
- Humayun Azad (1947–2004), Bangladeshi author and scholar
- Ghulam Nabi Azad (born 1949), Indian politician associated with the Congress party
- Abid Azad (1952–2005), Bangladeshi poet, critic and literary editor
- Md. Emdadul Haque Azad (born 1956), Bangladesh High Court judge
- Abdul Kader Azad (born 1959), Bangladeshi businessman and politician
- A. H. M. Hamidur Rahman Azad (born 1965), Bangladeshi politician
- Minhajul Arfin Azad (born 1971), Indian politician from West Bengal
- Kavi Kumar Azad (1972–2018), Indian actor famous for Taarak Mehta Ka Ooltah Chashmah (TV series)
- Chandrasekhar Azad (born 1986), Indian social activist
- Saba Azad (born 1985), Indian actress and musician
- Afshan Azad (born 1989), actress who played the character of Padma Patil in the Harry Potter films
- Raushan Azad, Bangladeshi politician

== Places ==
- Azad, Afghanistan
- Azat, Armenia
- Azad, Goranboy, Azerbaijan
- Azad, Goygol, Azerbaijan
- Azad, Sistan and Baluchestan, Iran
- Azad, alternate name of Deh-e Azad, Hirmand, Iran
- Azad, West Azerbaijan, Iran
- Azad-e Olya, Zanjan Province, Iran
- Azad-e Sofla, Zanjan Province, Iran
- Azad Kashmir, autonomous region of Pakistan within the disputed Kashmir region

== Entertainment ==
- Azad (fictional game), a fictional game from the book The Player of Games by Iain M. Banks
- Azadi (album), a 1997 album released by Pakistani rock band, Junoon
- Azad, a fictional region where most of the plot and gameplay of the videogame Prince of Persia: The Sands of Time takes place
- Azad Rathore, fictional police officer in the 2023 Indian film Jawan, played by Shah Rukh Khan
- Azad (1940 film), a 1940 Hindi film
- Azad (2000 film), a 2000 Telugu film
- Azad (2017 film), a 2017 Pakistani film

== Other uses ==
- Azadi Tower, a monument in Tehran, Iran
- Azadi Stadium, Iran's national and largest stadium
- The Azad, a Bengali newspaper founded in Kolkata and later became the leading daily in East Bengal
- Azad Hind, collaborationist provisional government of Free India led by Netaji Subhas Chandra Bose during World War II
- Azad Hind Fauj, Indian National Army organised by Netaji Subhas Chandra Bose
- Azad (movie theater), a Bangladeshi movie theater
- Islamic Azad University, a private university system in Iran
- Azad TV News, Hindi language news channel in India
- Azad Maidan riots,

== See also ==
- Azaad (disambiguation)
- Azadi (disambiguation)
- Azat (disambiguation)
- Azd, an Arabian tribe
