= Azadkhani =

Azadkhani (Persian: ازادخاني) may refer to:

- Azadkhani, Khorramabad
- Azadkhani, Selseleh
