= Abul Kalam =

Abul Kalam (Bengali: আবুল কালাম) meaning father of Kalam, is a given name and a common alias used by several people, typically Bengali and Bihari Muslims. It may refer to:

- Abul Kalam Azad (disambiguation), multiple people
  - Abul Kalam Azad (1888–1958), scholar and freedom fighter from pre-partition Bengal
- Abul Kalam Mohammed Zakaria (1918–2016), Bangladeshi scholar and archaeologist
- Abul Kalam (1923–2013), Pakistani-Deccani vice-chancellor of NED University of Engineering & Technology
- Abul Kalam Muhammad Yusuf (1926–2014), Bangladeshi religious scholar, writer, activist and politician
- Abul Kalam Manzur Morshed (1938–2023), former director-general of Bangla Academy
- Abul Kalam Faezul Huq (1944–2007), Bangladeshi politician, lawyer, and columnist
- Abul Kalam Mazumdar (1945–1994), Bangladeshi principal, social worker and politician
- Abul Kalam Abdul Momen (born 1947), Bangladeshi former foreign affairs minister
- Abul Kalam Qasmi (1950–2021), Indian-Bihari scholar, literary critic, poet and dean
- Abul Kalam Qasmi Shamsi (born 1951), Indian-Bihari Islamic scholar, author and essayist
- Abul Kalam Muhammad Ahsanul Hoque Chowdhury (born 1968), Bangladeshi politician
- Abul Kalam (born 1978), Bangladeshi kabaddi player
- Abul Kalam Rasheed Alam (born 1972), Indo-Bengali Assam MLA
- Abul Kalam, Bangladeshi politician
- S.M. Abul Kalam, Bangladeshi ambassador to Kuwait
- Abul Kalam Mohammad Ziaur Rahman, Bangladeshi major general
- Md. Abul Kalam, Bangladeshi politician
- Mohammad Abul Kalam, Bangladeshi politician
- Md. Abul Kalam (Comilla politician), Bangladeshi politician

== See also ==
- A. P. J. Abdul Kalam (1931-2015), a scientist and former President of India
