= Baháʼí House of Worship of Samoa =

Baháʼí temple in Tiapapata, Samoa

Baháʼí House of Worship (Samoa)
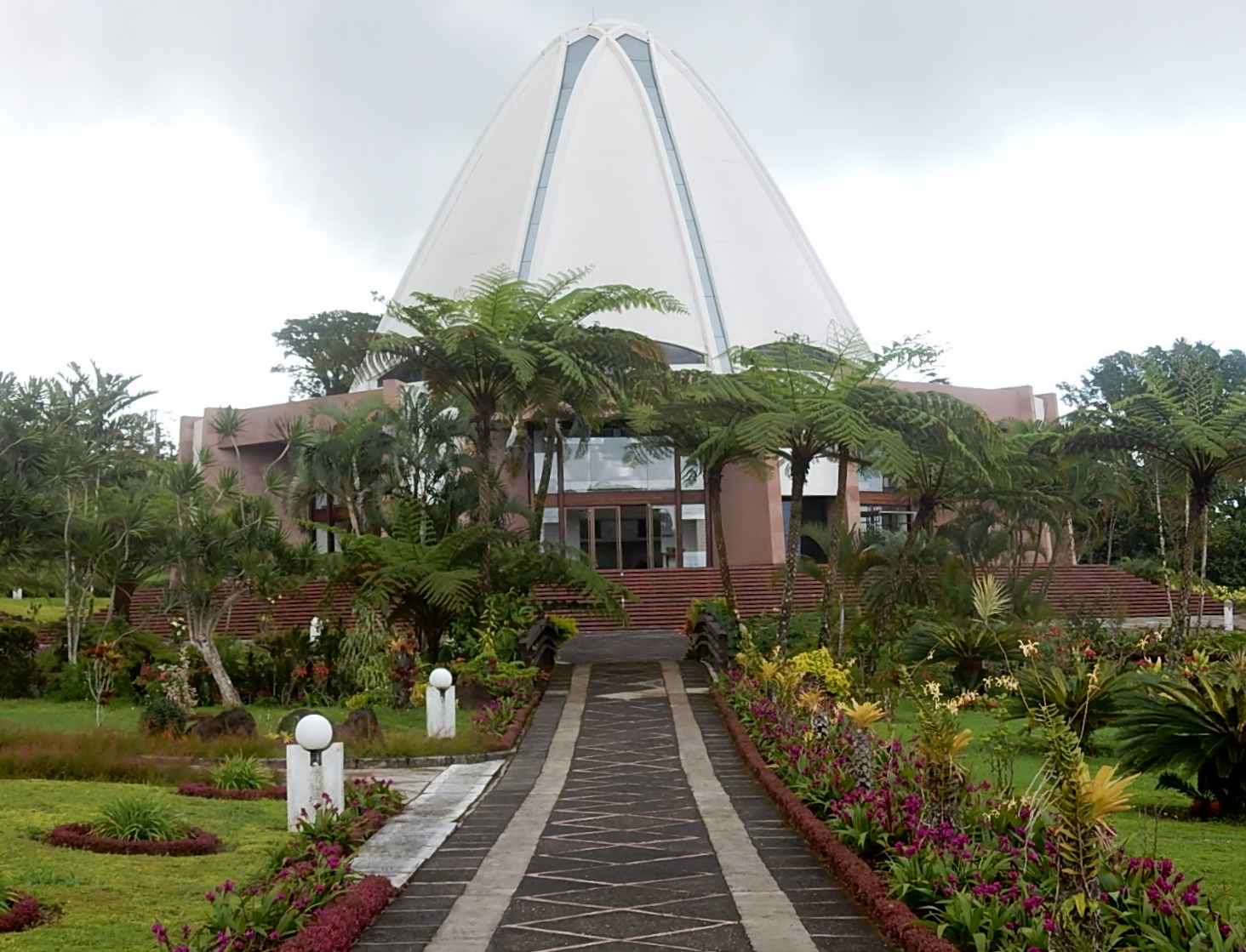

General information
- Coordinates: 13.896706°S 171.778312°W
- Groundbreaking: January 27, 1979
- Construction started: 1981
- Completed: 1984
- Opened: September 1, 1984

Height
- Height: 102 feet

Design and construction
- Architect: Hossein Amanat

Other information
- Seating capacity: 700

The Baháʼí House of Worship of Samoa is a Baháʼí House of Worship located in Tiapapata, inland from Apia, Samoa. The seventh Baháʼí House of Worship overall, it is the only Baháʼí temple in the Pacific islands, and thus is known by Baháʼís as the "mother temple of the Pacific Islands." Construction of the temple began in 1981 and finished in 1984.

== History ==
Plans for the construction of a Baháʼí House of Worship in Samoa were announced in 1974, and a location was selected in 1975. Hossein Amanat was chosen as architect in April 1978 and his design was approved in September of that year. Malietoa Tanumafili II laid a cornerstone on January 27, 1979, with Rúhíyyih Khánum attending as a representative of the Universal House of Justice. Construction began in late 1980 or 1981 and finished in 1984. The construction cost $6.5 million total. The temple was officially opened in a September 1, 1984 ceremony also attended by Malietoa Tanumafili II and Rúhíyyih Khánum.

== Building and grounds ==
The temple was designed by Hossein Amanat. Its architecture was inspired by fale, particularly in the shape of its dome. The temple is 102 feet tall and can seat 700 (500 on the main floor and 200 on the mezzanine), and is surrounded by around 17 acres of gardens.

The temple's white dome is clad in mosaic tiles and rests on nine pairs of buttresses faced with red granite. According to its architect's firm, the walls are white concrete made with coral aggregate from Niue, chosen to suit the humid climate. Windows converge at the top of the dome, which bears the calligraphic name of Baháʼu'lláh and a nine-pointed star. The gardens hold more than 60 native Samoan plant species.
