= Azat (disambiguation) =

Azat may refer to:

- Azad, Azerbaijan (disambiguation), multiple villages of that name
- Azat, a class of Armenian nobility
- Azat Republican Party of Kazakhstan
- Azat (river) in Armenia
- Azat, Armenia, a village in Gegharkunik province, Armenia
- Azat, Kazakhstan
- Azat-Châtenet, Creuse, France
- Azat-le-Ris, Haute-Vienne, France

== People ==
- Azat Demirtaş (born 2002), Turkish long-distance runner

== See also ==
- Azad (disambiguation)
