= Abul Kalam Azad (disambiguation) =

Maulana Abul Kalam Azad (1888–1958), popularly known as Maulana Azad, was an Indian independence activist, scholar and politician, who served as the first Minister of Education of India.

Abul Kalam Azad may also refer to:

- Abul Kalam Azad (intellectual) (1933–1971), Bengali mathematician
- Abul Kalam Azad (politician, born 1939), Bangladeshi politician and former minister of information and culture
- Abul Kalam Azad Chowdhury (born 1946), Bangladeshi academic and 23rd vice-chancellor of the University of Dhaka
- Abul Kalam Azad (politician, born 1947), Bangladeshi televangelist and war criminal
- Abul Kalam Azad (politician, born 1950), Bangladeshi businessman, freedom fighter and MP for Rangpur-6
- Syed Abul Kalam Azad (born 1951), professor and former treasurer of University of Dhaka and National University, Bangladesh
- S.M. Abul Kalam Azad (politician) (born 1954), Bangladesh Nationalist Front politician
- Abul Kalam Azad (lawyer) (1955–2015), Bangladeshi lawyer and politician
- Abul Kalam Azad (doctor) (born 1960), former director general of the Bangladeshi Directorate General of Health Services
- Khan Abul Kalam Azad (born 1960), physician and principal of Dhaka Medical College
- Abul Kalam Azad Siddiqui (born 1964), Bangladeshi parliamentarian
- Azad Abul Kalam (born 1966), Bangladeshi actor and director
- S.M Abul Kalam Azad (admiral) (born 1967), Bangladeshi admiral
- Abul Kalam Azad (Indian politician) (born 1967), Indian politician from Assam
- Abul Kalam Azad (officer) (1971–2017), Bangladesh Army and Rapid Action Battalion officer
- Abul Kalam Azad (businessman), Bangladeshi businessman and founder of Azad Products
- Abul Kalam Azad (Jamalpur-5 MP) (born 1957), Bangladeshi civil servant and secretary to the prime minister
- Abul Kalam Azad (Rajshahi politician), Bangladeshi parliamentarian from Rajshahi
- Abul Kalam Azad (Comilla politician), Bangladeshi politician from Comilla
- Abul Kalam Azad (Gaibandha politician) (born 1958), Bangladeshi politician
- Md. Abul Kalam Azad (Khulna politician)
- Abul Kalam Azad Khan, Bangladeshi physician and social worker

== See also ==
- Abul Kalam (disambiguation)
- Azad (disambiguation)
