= Azad, Azerbaijan =

Azad, Azerbaijan may refer to:

- Azad, Goranboy
- Azad, Goygol
