= Shrine of ʻAbdu'l-Bahá =

Tomb under construction near Acre, Israel

- Shrine of ‘Abdu’l-Bahá, graphic rendering
- Interactive map of Shrine of ʻAbdu'l-Bahá
- Location: Acre, Israel
- Coordinates: 32.91693°N 35.08978°E
- Designer: Hossein Amanat
- Type: Shrine
- Beginning date: 2019; 7 years ago
- Dedicated to: ʻAbdu'l-Bahá

The Shrine of ʻAbdu'l-Bahá is a religious monument under construction near ʻAkká. It is intended as the permanent resting place of ʻAbdu'l-Bahá (1844–1921), the eldest son of Baháʼu'lláh, and a central figure of the Baháʼí Faith. Bahá’u’lláh appointed ʻAbdu'l-Bahá as the sole authoritative interpreter of his teachings, a position ʻAbdu'l-Bahá held from 1892 until his death in 1921. He is regarded within the Baháʼí community as the "Centre of the Covenant" designed by Bahá’u’lláh to preserve the unity of his faith.

Though ’Abdu’l-Bahá lived most of his life as a political prisoner—much of it in the environs of ‘Akká—the Young Turk Revolution of 1908 freed him to travel extensively throughout Europe and North America in the early 20th century, bringing the Bahá’í Faith to a wider international audience.

Since his passing, his remains have been held in a vault beneath the Shrine of the Báb on Mount Carmel in the port city of Haifa, approximately 10 kilometres (6 mi) north of ʻAkká. In 2019, the Universal House of Justice, the faith's global governing body, announced plans to construct a permanent shrine in honor of ’Abdu’l-Bahá. It chose to build the shrine near the Riḍván Garden, a rural retreat in which Baháʼu'lláh rested during the latter days of his exile in ʻAkká and which has also become a site of Bahá’í Pilgrimage.

The Shrine of ʻAbdu'l-Bahá was designed by Iranian-Canadian architect Hossein Amanat, known for his work on both secular and Baháʼí sacred architecture.

== Design and construction ==
On 20 April 2019, the Universal House of Justice announced that the time for the construction of a permanent resting place for ’Abdu’l-Bahá had come, and provided these initial details:

"...The Baháʼí world is being summoned to build the edifice which will forever embosom those sacred remains. It is to be constructed in the vicinity of the Riḍván Garden, on land consecrated by the footsteps of the Blessed Beauty [that is, Baháʼu'lláh]; the Shrine of ʻAbdu'l-Bahá will thus lie on the crescent traced between the Holy Shrines in ʻAkká and Haifa. Work on the architectural plans is advancing, and more information will be shared in the coming months."

On 7 May 2019, the Universal House of Justice announced Hossein Amanat as the architect of the new Shrine. On 19 September 2019, the Universal House of Justice released Amanat’s design concept for the Shrine of ’Abdu’l-Bahá, stating that the structure envisaged in the design seeks "to honor ʻAbdu'l-Bahá's unique position" and "to reflect at once His lofty station and His humility."

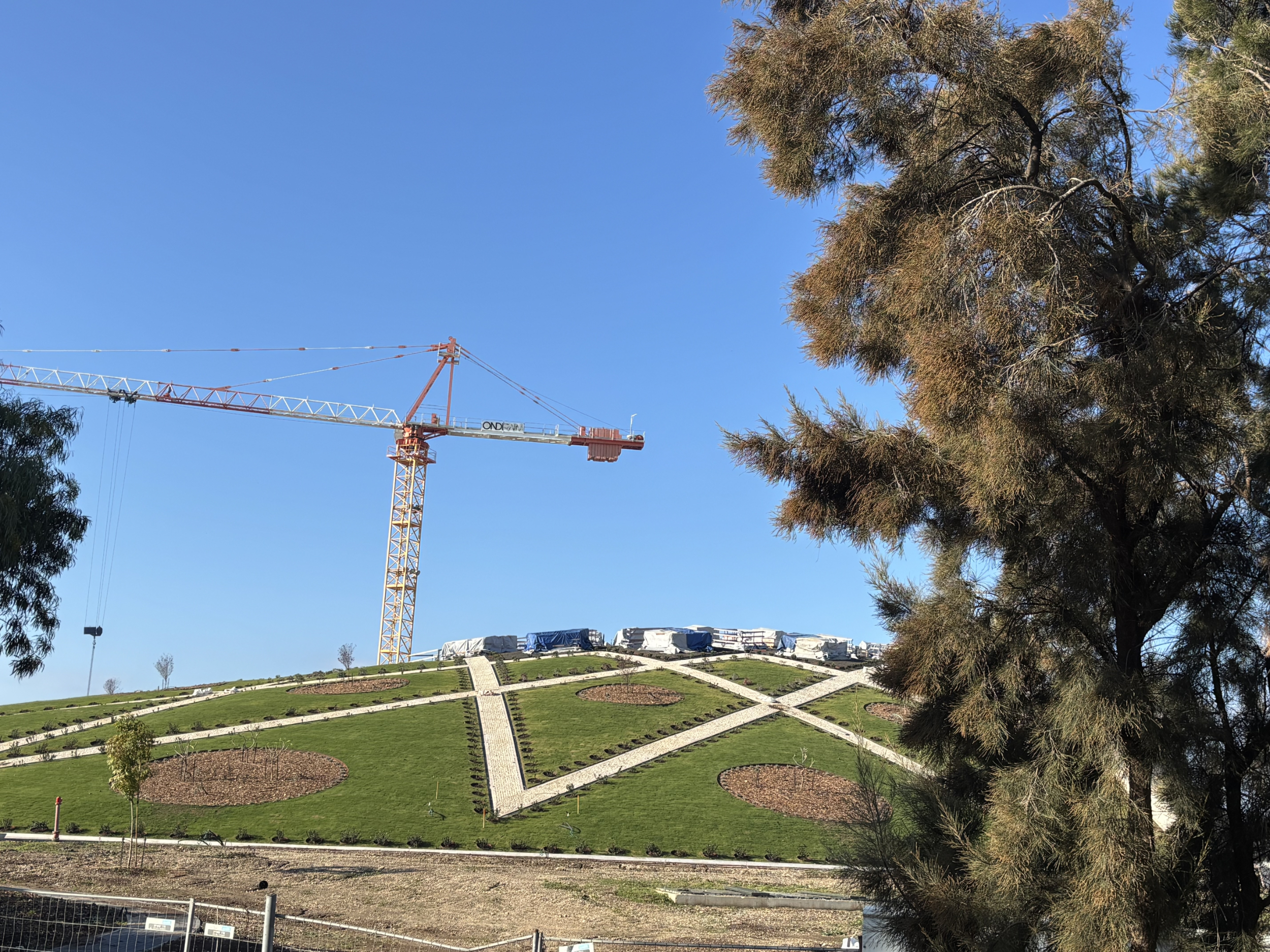
Shrine of Abdu'l-Bahá under construction near Akka (Acre), Israel

Amanat described the overarching intention as something wholly unprecedented: "This should be unlike any other building. It seeks to manifest ʻAbdu'l-Bahá's selflessness, wisdom, openness, acceptance, and kindness towards all people, to embody His love for gardens and nature, and to reflect His progressive and forward-looking approach."

A central organizing principle of the design is drawn from a prayer composed by ʻAbdu'l-Bahá, in which he prays to be made "as dust in the pathway of Thy loved ones”. Amanat noted that ʻAbdu'l-Bahá had expressed a wish to be buried under the sands between Haifa and ʻAkká, which he described as the pathway taken by pilgrims.

Amanat explained the tension at the heart of the design: "Considering the essence of these words and referring to ʻAbdu'l-Bahá's attributes, one is hesitant to design an imposing structure for His resting place. His wishes must be taken into consideration, but not to such a literal extent that His station is not revered and recognized. His resting place must be new and unique, and not like any other building."

Graphic rendering of the interior of Shrine of Abdu'l-Baha

Amanat’s design places the inner sanctum of the shrine at the heart of a garden that forms the roof and extends beyond, creating a path meant to facilitate stages on a meditative journey toward it. The architect envisioned the interior as “a place of diffused light and quiet contemplation. ‘Abdu’l-Baha’s resting spot is placed at the centre of this serene space, and a sunburst pattern emanating from His resting place will embrace the whole garden, symbolizing the radiance that ‘Abdu’l-Baha brought to the people of the world”.

Amanat sees his design in the context of ʻAbdu'l-Bahá's broader significance, stating: "ʻAbdu'l-Bahá was a modern Man. He was a harbinger of the new—His words were new, the Teachings of His Father that He promulgated were new, and He called humanity to a new set of relationships. This building seeks to reflect that."

== 2022 construction fire ==
On 8 April 2022, a fire broke out at the construction site of the new shrine. (Note: The fire was described in court filings as "enormous-scale, one of the hardest that occurred in Israel".) Windblown sparks from welding on the dome ignited scaffolding and expanded polystyrene (EPS) forms being used to mold poured concrete. Firefighters brought the blaze under control; no one was injured and the adjacent Riḍván Garden was not affected.

The Universal House of Justice described the fire as "a considerable setback for the project" and said that the steps required to resume construction would begin "as expeditiously as possible".

An investigation concluded in July 2022 that the fire was accidental. The Universal House of Justice stated that the shrine's structures were "fundamentally sound" but that extensive testing was under way to ensure the project met "the highest standard of excellence". No specific completion date was set, but the fire was expected to cause significant delay.

While the fire has caused a substantial delay in completion of the project, construction has resumed and the Bahá’í World News Service (BWNS) continues to post updates on the shrine’s progress. On 10 June 2026, BWNS released an article with photographs and video, noting the intensification of the work on the central shrine.

== Bibliography ==
- Amanat, Hossein (2026). "amanatarchitect.com". Amanat Architect.
- Itiel, Yoav (11 April 2022). הבנייה במקדש עבאס אפנדי בעכו תתחדש לאחר שפרצה באתר שריפה [Construction at the Abbas Effendi temple in Acre to resume after fire broke out at site]. Walla! News (in Hebrew).
- Esslemont, John E. (2006) [1923]. Bahá'u'lláh and the New Era. Wilmette, IL: Bahá’í Publishing Trust. pp. 3:38. ISBN 978-1931847278.
- Esslemont (2006), Chapter 3, para. 38
- Rabbani, Rúhíyyih (1969). The Priceless Pearl. London: Baháʼí Publishing Trust. Chapter 2, para. 16.
- Smith, Peter (1999). A Concise Encyclopedia of the Baháʼí Faith. Oxford, UK: Oneworld Publications. ISBN 1-85168-184-1.
- Smith, Peter (2000). A Concise Encyclopedia of the Baháʼí Faith. Oxford: Oneworld Publications. pp. 14–20. ISBN 978-1851681846.
- "2019 Ridván Message - To the Baháʼís of the World". universalhouseofjustice.bahai.org. Archived from the original on 2019-04-20.
- "Design concept for the Shrine of ʻAbdu'l-Baha unveiled". Baháʼí World News Service. 20 September 2019. Archived from the original on 2019-09-20.
- "Shrine of 'Abdu'l-Bahá construction nears major milestone". Bahá’í World News Service. 2023.
- "Shrine of 'Abdu'l-Bahá construction nears major milestone". Bahá’í World News Service. 2026.
- "Universal House of Justice announces architect for Shrine of 'Abdu'l-Baha". Baháʼí World News Service. 2019-05-07. Archived from the original on 2020-08-04.
- "After Fire, Construction To Resume At $77 Million Bahá'í Shrine In Israel". Religion Unplugged. 18 April 2022.
- "8 April 2022 – To all National Spiritual Assemblies". Bahai.org. 8 April 2022.
- "4 July 2022 – To all National Spiritual Assemblies". www.bahai.org.
- פרויקט המקדש הבהאי ניזוק בשריפה, הכשרה נתבעת לשלם תגמולים בסך 77 מיליון שקל [Bahá'í temple project damaged in fire; Hachshara Insurance Company sued for 77 million shekels in insurance proceeds]. Polisa News (in Hebrew). 14 November 2022.
