= Dəyirmanlar =

Coordinates: 40°30′N 46°22′E

Dəyirmanlar (known as Mixaylovka until 1998) is a village and municipality in the Goranboy Rayon of Azerbaijan. It has a population of 897. The municipality consists of the villages of Dəyirmanlar and Azad.
