= Hossein Amanat =

Iranian-born Canadian architect (born 1942)

- حسین امانت
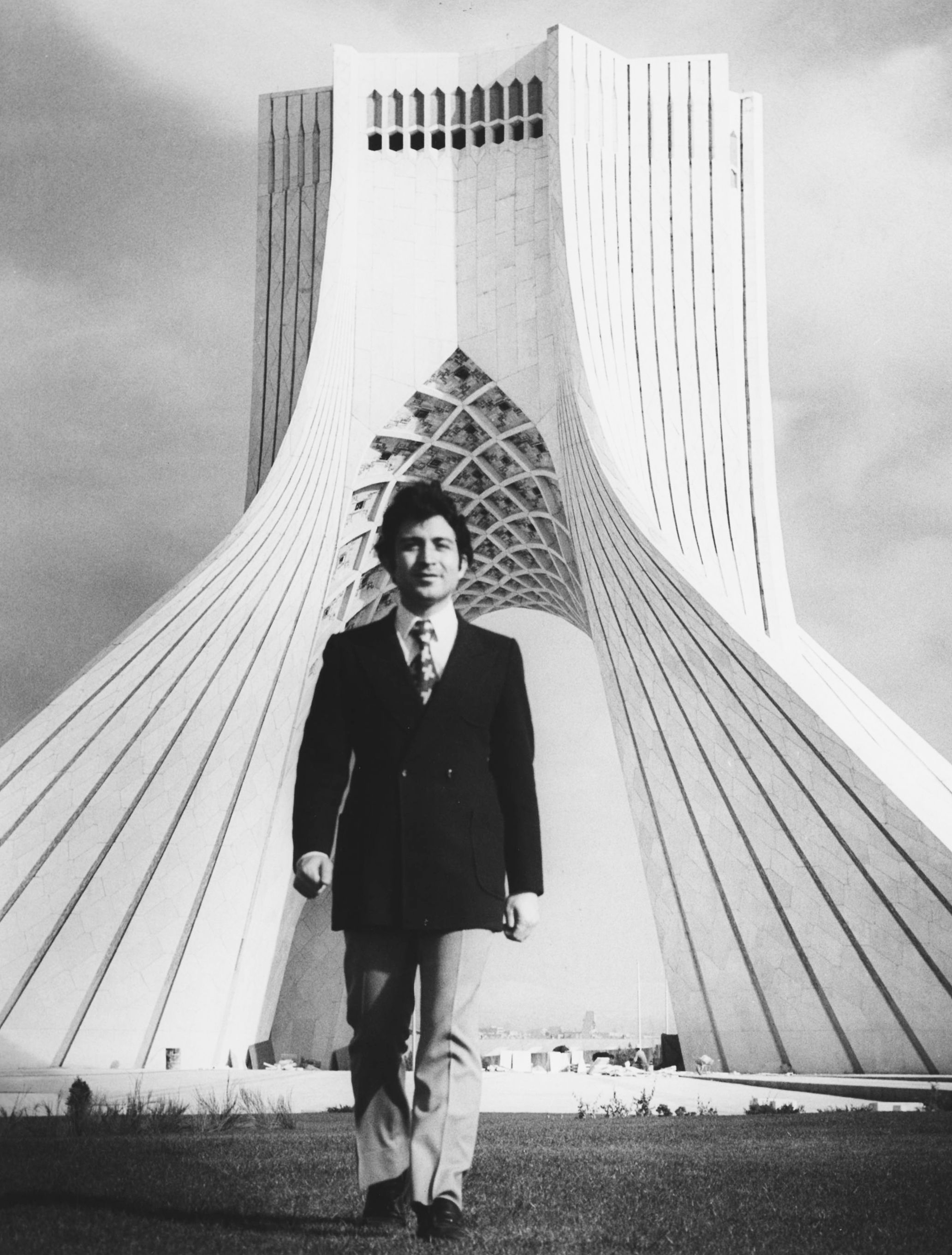
- Amanat in front of the Azadi Tower
- Born: 17 March 1942 (age 84); Tehran, Imperial State of Iran
- Education: University of Tehran
- Occupation: Architect
- Practice: Amanat Architect / Arc Design International Corp.
- Buildings: Shahyad Tower in Teheran, Baháʼí Arc in Haifa, Shrine of ʻAbdu'l-Bahá near Acre, Israel

Hossein Amanat (Persian: حسین امانت, born 1942) is an Iranian-Canadian architect. He is best known as the architect of the Shahyad Tower (renamed as Azadi Tower after the 1979 revolution) in Tehran, Iran, the Baháʼí Arc buildings in Haifa, Israel and the House of Worship in Samoa. He has also been designated as the architect of the Shrine of ʻAbdu'l-Bahá, as of 2019 under construction near Acre, Israel.

== Life and practice ==
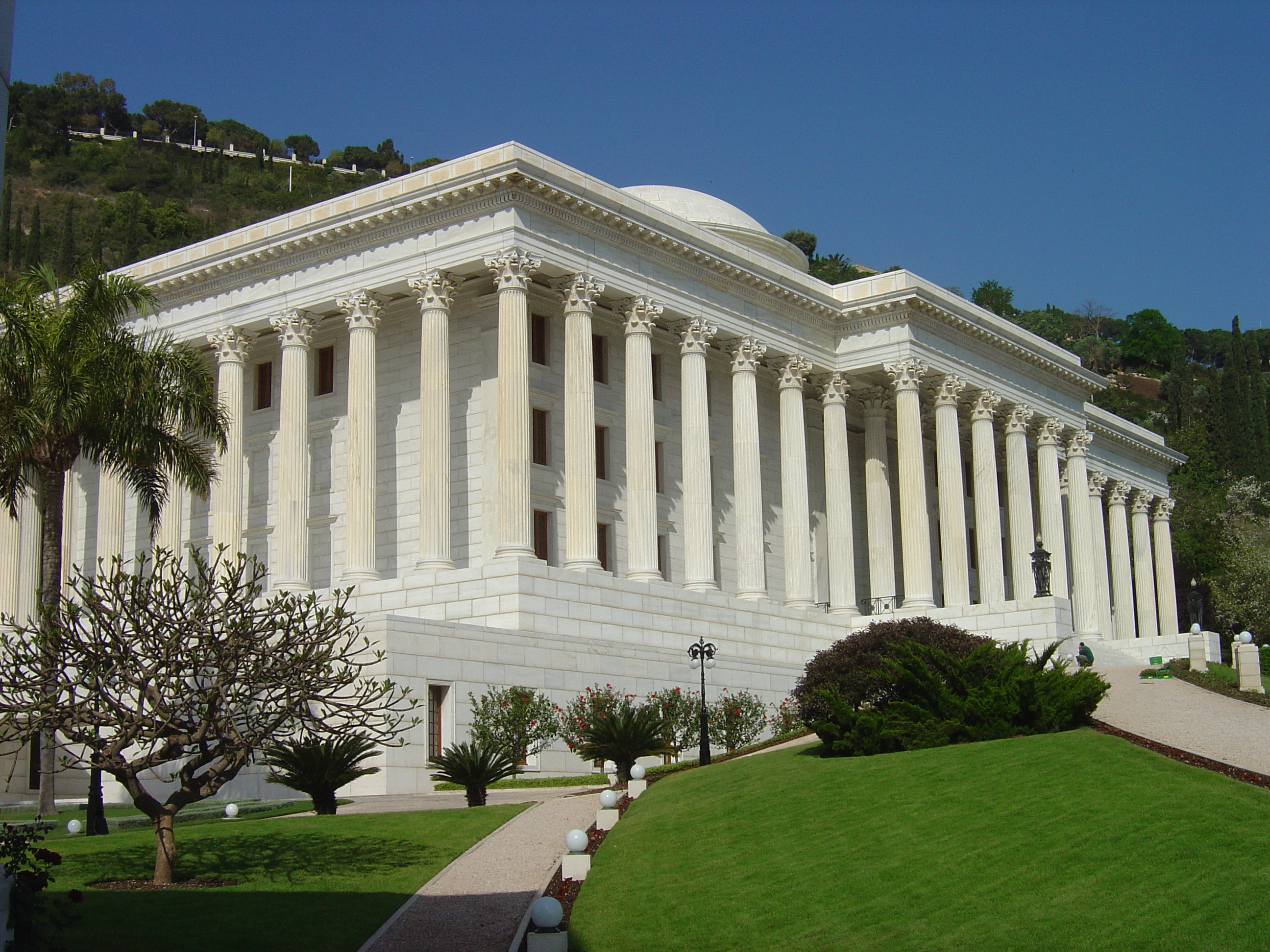
Seat of the Universal House of Justice.

As a young graduate from the University of Tehran. He is one of the students of Hooshang Seyhoun. He won a nationwide competition in 1966 to design the Shahyad Tower, renamed the Azadi Tower in 1979. This first architectural project led to the opportunity to create some of Iran's most distinctive projects with reference to traditional Persian architecture. Amongst them are the initial buildings of the Sharif University of Technology in Tehran, Iran, the Persian Heritage Center, the Faculty for Business Management of the Tehran University and the Embassy of Iran in Beijing, China.

As a member of the persecuted Baháʼí Faith, Amanat fled the country during the 1979 Iranian Revolution. He is the brother of Abbas Amanat, a professor of history and international studies at Yale University in New Haven, Connecticut.

Since moving to Canada in 1980, Hossein Amanat designed the three administrative buildings on the Baháʼí Arc in Haifa, Israel, the Baháʼí House of Worship in Samoa, the Jiang'an Library for the Sichuan University, the media library for the Beijing Broadcasting Institute. He designed religious and cultural centers for the Baháʼí Faith near Dallas, Seattle and Washington, D.C., several multifamily condominiums in Santa Monica, and mixed-use high-rise buildings in San Diego and Burnaby.

On 7 May 2019, the Universal House of Justice announced Amanat as the architect of the future Shrine of ʻAbdu'l-Bahá near Acre, Israel.

== List of projects ==
- Shahyad Tower (1971), renamed Azadi Tower in 1979, Tehran, Iran
- Pasargad Archeological Museum (1973)
- Sharif University of Technology (1975, formerly Aryamehr University), Tehran, Iran
- Faculty of Business Management University (1980)
- Iranian embassy in Beijing, China (1983)
- Seat of the Universal House of Justice (1983), Israel
- Bahá'í House of Worship Samoa (1984), Apia, Samoa
- Center for the Study of the Texts (2001), Israel
- International Teaching Centre (2001), Haifa, Israel
- International Archives extension (2001)
- Bahá'í Faith world administrative center 2001
- Horizons tower 2001
- Plano Bahá'í community center 2004
- Sichuan university center library 2005
- Bellevue Bahá'í community center (2006)
- Baha`i community center (2007), Loudoun County, Virginia
- Legacy (2008)
- Bayside (2009)
- Amanat office (2009)
- Beijing broadcasting institute library (2011)
- zonda (2016)
- Arris (2017)
- Savina (2017)
- One 88 (2018)
- 777 front (2019)

== Awards ==
- 2025, recipient of the Bita Prize for Persian Arts
- 2024, recipient of the Doctors of Letters Honorary Degree from The University of British Columbia
- 2001, American Concrete Institute Award
- 1995, Excellence in Building Design, Marble from Greece Competition
- 1985, Tucker Award for Architectural Excellence
- 1975, Royal Pahlavi Medal for Design
- 1971, Medal of Art, Iranian Ministry of Education

== Gallery ==
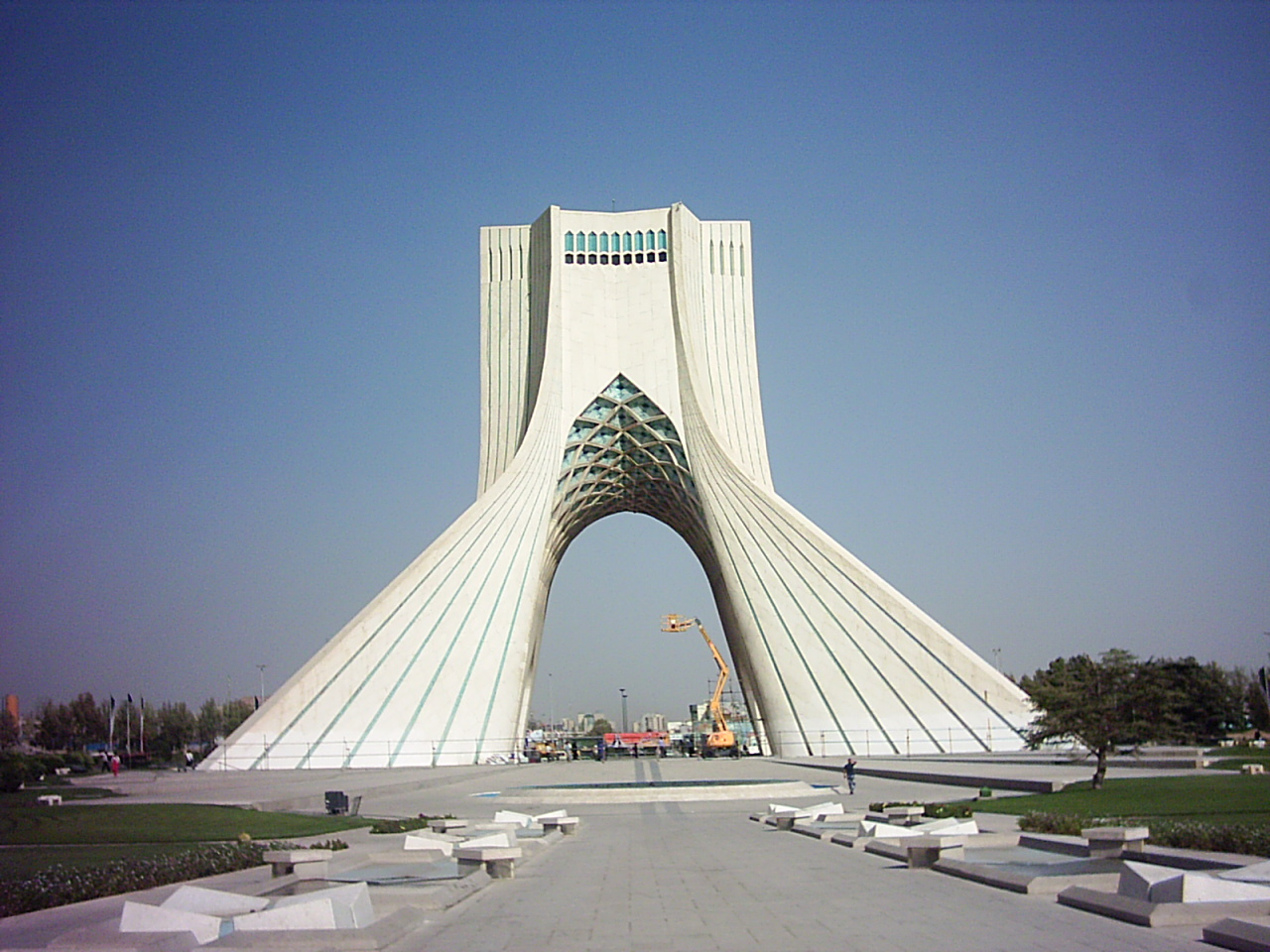
Azadi Tower, Tehran, Iran

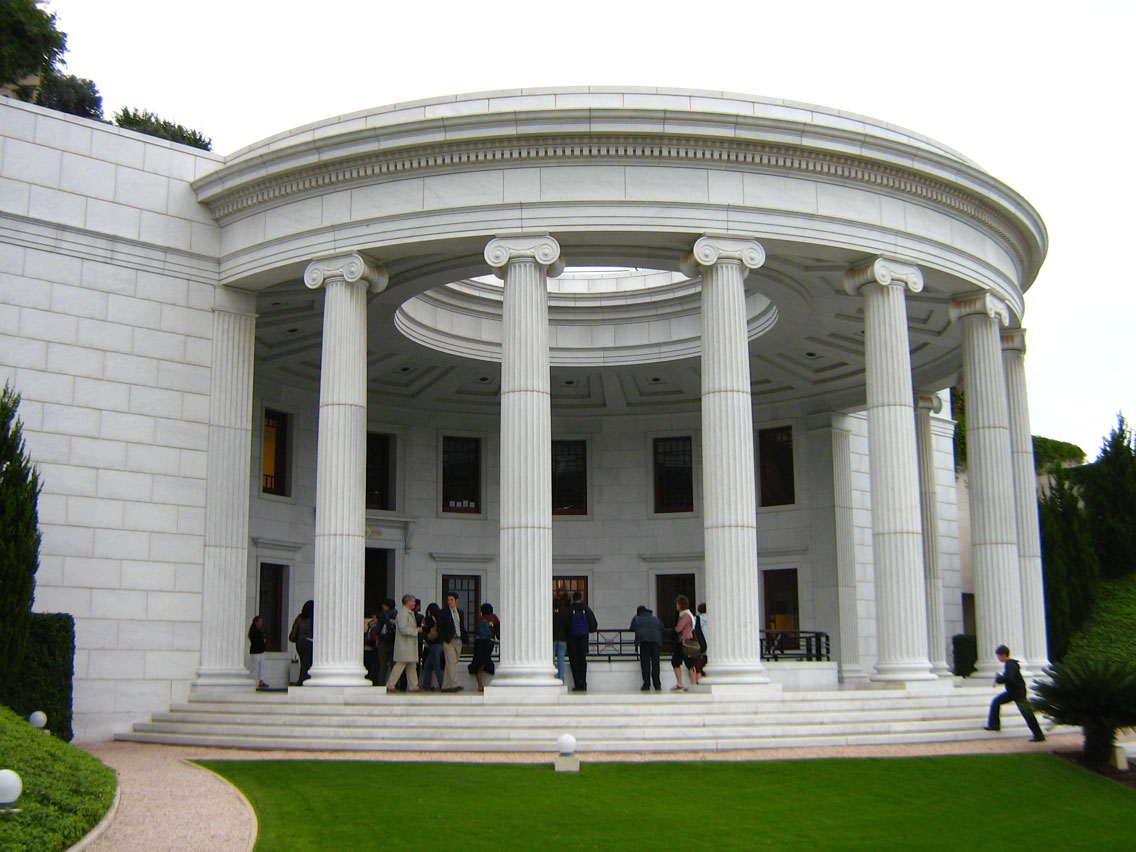
Centre for the Study of the Sacred Texts

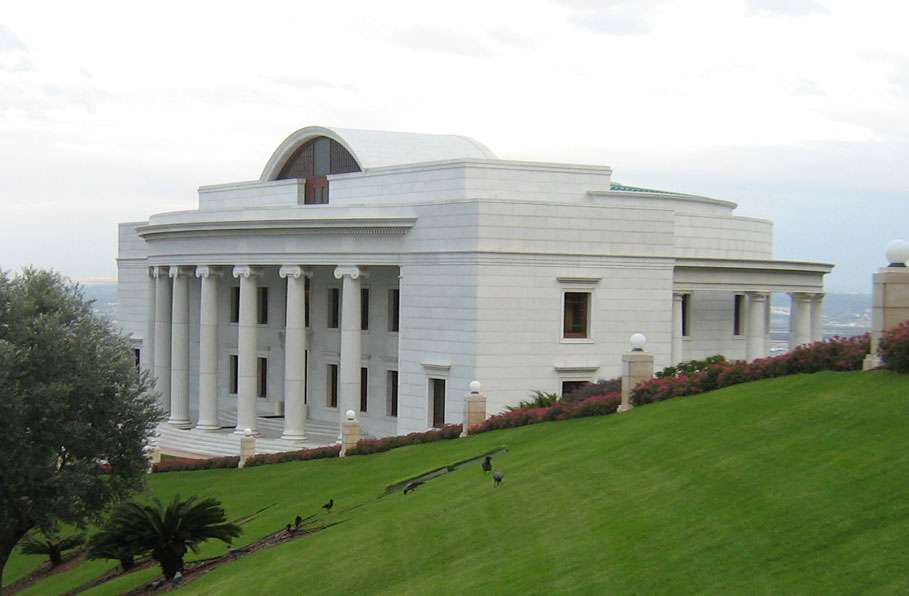
The Seat of the International Teaching Centre

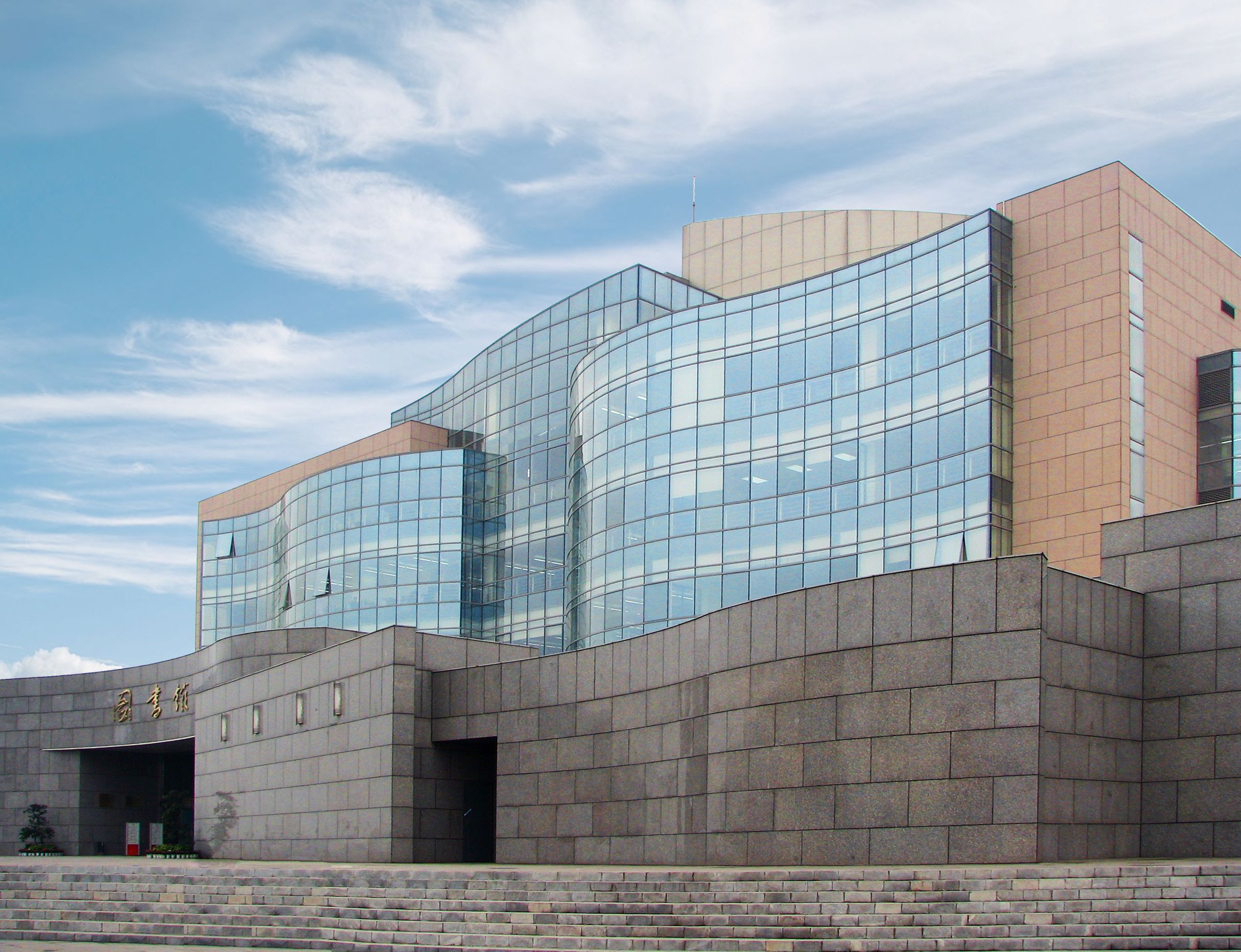
Jiang'an Library at the Sichuan University, China

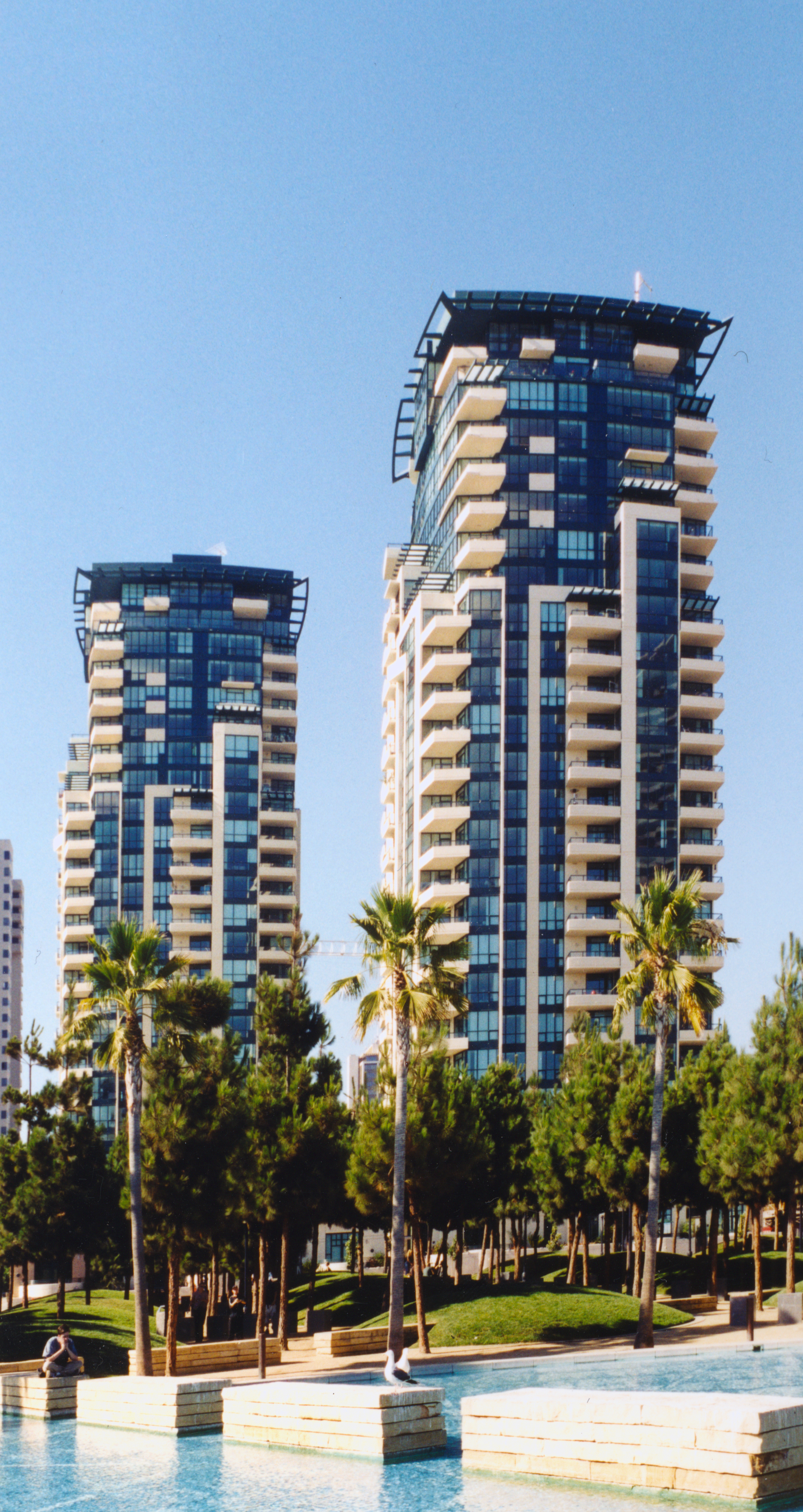
Horizon residential Towers, San Diego, California

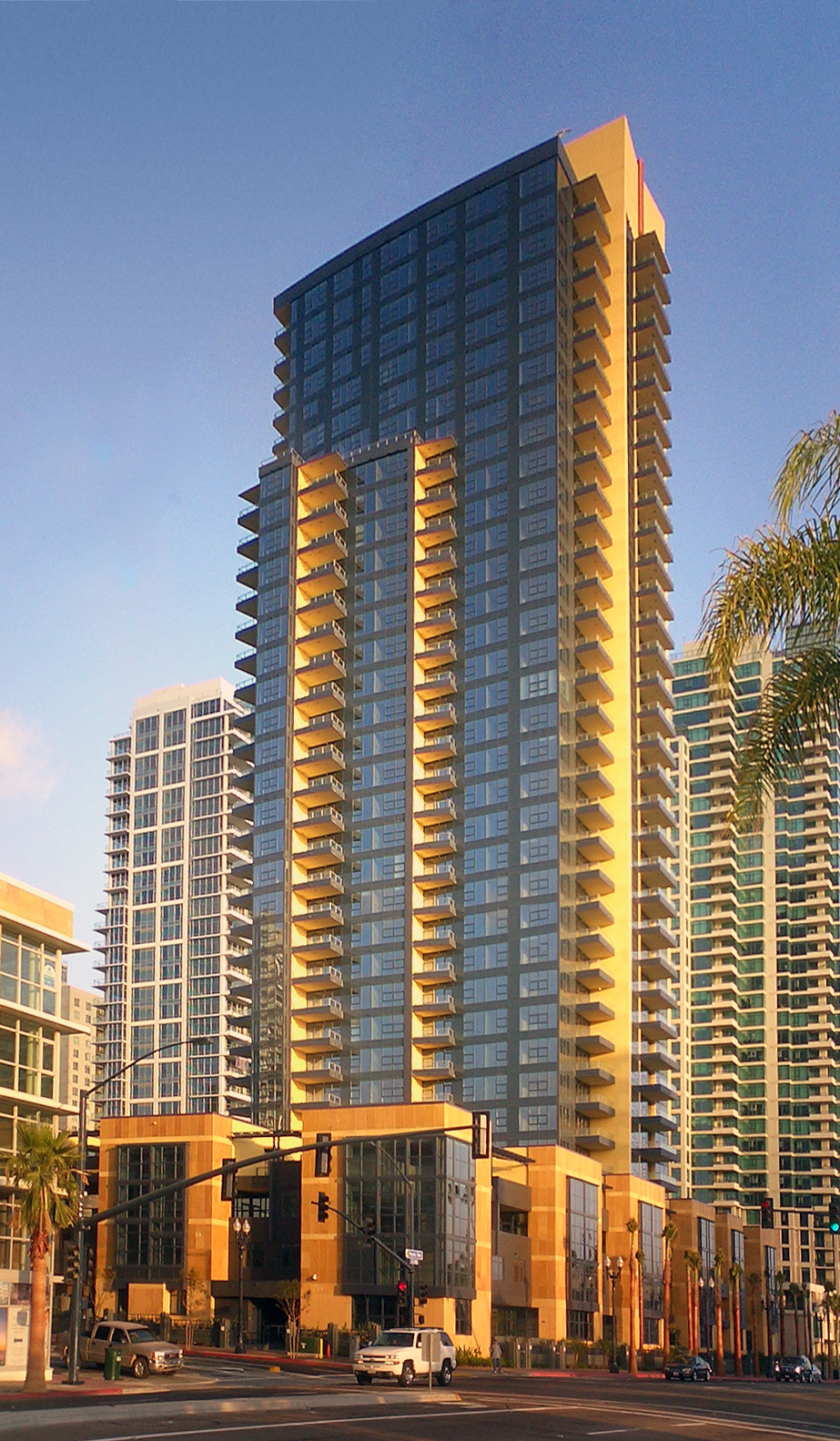
Bayside residential Tower, San Diego, California

== See also ==
- List of historical Iranian architects
