= Simaye Azadi =

Iranian television channel

- Country: Europe
- Broadcast area: Worldwide
- Headquarters: Europe

Programming
- Language(s): Persian
- Picture format: 576i, 16:9 (SDTV); 1080i (HDTV)

Ownership
- Owner: People's Mojahedin Organization of Iran

History
- Launched: 1987; 38 years ago

Links
- Website: http://iranntv.com

Simaye Azadi (Persian: سیمای آزادی, lit. "Face of Freedom"), also known as Iran National Television (INTV) (Persian: تلویزیون ملی ایران) is a satellite television channel by the organisation People's Mojahedin Organization of Iran (PMOI) and National Council of Resistance of Iran (NCRI). It is broadcast from Europe, containing subjects relating to Iran and PMOI. It mostly broadcasts news, but also has documentaries, music, and social and cultural specials.

== 2009 protests in Iran ==
There were protests in Iran on the Shi'a holiday of Ashura to protest the outcome of the 2009 Iranian presidential election. Abdolkarim Soroush has identified the moment as a turning point in the Ahmedinejad regime's crackdown on the Iranian Green Movement. Various parties in Iran including Kazem Jalali and the Iranian intelligence service blamed Mojahedin-e Khalq for the unrest, linking the group publicly for the first time with the Green Movement. Opposition leaders like Mir-Hossein Mousavi hurried to dispute the government's characterizations.
