= Azad, Afghanistan =

Azad
- Location in Afghanistan
- Coordinates: 32°25′5″N 61°32′28″E
- Country: Afghanistan
- Province: Farah Province

Azad (Pashto: ازاد) is a town of Farah Province in western Afghanistan near the border with Iran. It is located at 32°38'5N 61°32'28E with an altitude of 724 metres (2378 feet).
