= Azadi, Dasht-e Azadegan =

Coordinates: 30°51′22″N 50°10′23″E

Azadi ازادي
- Village
- Interactive map of Azadi
- Country: Iran
- Province: Khuzestan
- County: Dasht-e Azadegan
- Bakhsh: Central
- Rural District: Howmeh-ye Gharbi

Population (2006)
  - Total: 45
- Time zone: UTC+3:30 (IRST)
  - Summer (DST): UTC+4:30 (IRDT)

Azadi (Persian: ازادي, also Romanized as Āzādī) is a village in Howmeh-ye Gharbi Rural District, in the Central District of Dasht-e Azadegan County, Khuzestan Province, Iran. At the 2006 census, its population was 45, in 6 families.
