= Deh-e Azad, Hirmand =

Deh-e Azad ده ازاد
- Village
- Location within Iran
- Coordinates: 31°03′15″N 61°45′40″E
- Country: Iran
- Province: Sistan and Baluchestan
- County: Hirmand
- Bakhsh: Central
- Rural District: Jahanabad

Population (2006)
  - Total: 167
- Time zone: UTC+3:30 (IRST)
  - Summer (DST): UTC+4:30 (IRDT)

Deh-e Azad (Persian: ده ازاد, also Romanized as Deh-e Āzād; also known as Āzād) is a village in Jahanabad Rural District, in the Central District of Hirmand County, Sistan and Baluchestan Province, Iran. At the 2006 census, its population was 167, in 32 families.
