= Azad, Sistan and Baluchestan =

Azad ازاد
- Village
- Location within Iran
- Coordinates: 31°06′23″N 61°47′53″E
- Country: Iran
- Province: Sistan and Baluchestan
- County: Hirmand
- Bakhsh: Central
- Rural District: Dust Mohammad

Population (2006)
  - Total: 238
- Time zone: UTC+3:30 (IRST)
  - Summer (DST): UTC+4:30 (IRDT)

Azad (Persian: ازاد, also Romanized as Āzād; also known as Sāsūkī-ye Āzād) is a village in Dust Mohammad Rural District, in the Central District of Hirmand County, Sistan and Baluchestan Province, Iran. At the 2006 census, its population was 238, in 44 families.
