= Azaad =

Azaad may refer to:

- Azaad (1955 film), an Indian Hindi-language drama film by S. M. Sriramulu
- Azaad (1978 film), an Indian Hindi-language action film by Pramod Chakravorty
- Azaad TV, an Indian Hindi-language general entertainment channel 2021–2022
- Azaad Liadi (born 1998), American soccer player
- Azaad (2025 film), an Indian Hindi-language period drama film by Abhishek Kapoor

== See also ==
- Azad (disambiguation)
