= Parsian Azadi Hotel =

Skyscraper hotel in Tehran, Iran

Coordinates: 35.7896°N 51.3900°E

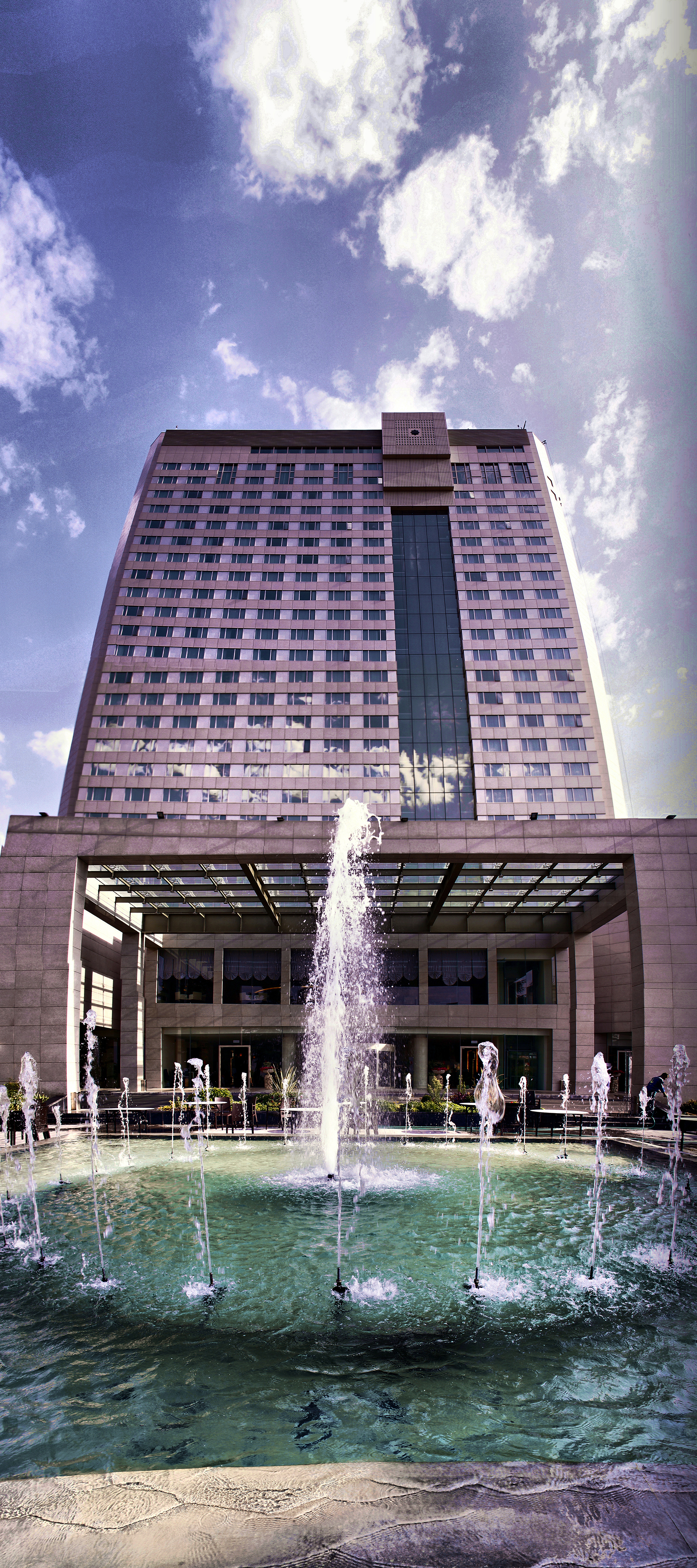
- Parsian Azadi Hotel, 2016
- Interactive map of the Parsian Azadi Hotel area
- Hotel chain: Parsian Hotels

General information
- Location: Tehran, Iran
- Opening: September 1, 1978
- Management: Parsian International Hotels Co.

Technical details
- Floor count: 25

Other information
- Number of rooms: 482
- Number of suites: 3
- Number of restaurants: 6

The Parsian Azadi Hotel (Persian: هتل پارسیان آزادی) is one of the largest and tallest hotels in Tehran, situated in the northern Evin neighborhood, overlooking the city. The hotel has 475 guest rooms & suites.

== History ==
On May 24, 1976, Hyatt International signed a contract to manage a new hotel to be built by the Royal Estates Administration in Tehran. It was the third Hyatt to open in Iran, following the Hyatt Omar Khayyam in the city of Mashhad, opened in November 1973, and the Hyatt Regency Caspian, a seaside beach resort in Chalus, opened on March 11, 1976.

The Hyatt Crown Tehran was completed two years later, but only partially opened on September 1, 1978, due to the then-ongoing Iranian Revolution. In February 1979, all foreign Hyatt staff departed the hotel due to safety concerns and the Hyatt Crown Tehran was transferred from the REA to the Pahlavi Foundation. On February 12, 1979, the Hyatt Crown Tehran was attacked by Revolutionary Guards. It was extensively damaged and occupied by the Guards, but remained in operation, run by Hyatt-trained Iranian staff.

On December 27, 1979, the Pahlavi Foundation terminated Hyatt International's management contracts for the three hotels, citing the departure of the foreign staff as grounds, resulting in a lengthy international lawsuit filed by Hyatt. The Hyatt Crown Tehran was renamed the Tehran Crown Hotel and the three hotels were transferred to the Pahlavi Foundation's successor organization, the Foundation of the Oppressed and Disabled. The hotel was again renamed the Azadi Grand Hotel (Azadi means "Freedom" in Persian) in 1980. The Foundation's hotel division was separated off in 1995, named first Bonyads Hotels, then Azadi Hotels in 1999 and finally Parsian Hotels in 2000.

The Azadi Grand Hotel closed in 2007 for a $50 million renovation overseen by Franco-Italian, Swiss-German and British interior designers and a number of Western/European construction firms. It also underwent seismic retrofitting, due to the danger of earthquakes in Tehran. It reopened in 2008 as the Parsian Azadi Hotel.

== In Media ==
In January 1979, Ross Perot and members of his team stayed at the Hyatt Crown Tehran as part of a mission Perot organized to rescue two of his employees from a Tehran prison. The mission was dramatized in Ken Follett's 1983 international bestseller On Wings of Eagles, which was filmed as a 1986 TV miniseries.

== Gallery ==
Parsian Azadi Hotel

Parsian Azadi Hotel, 2013

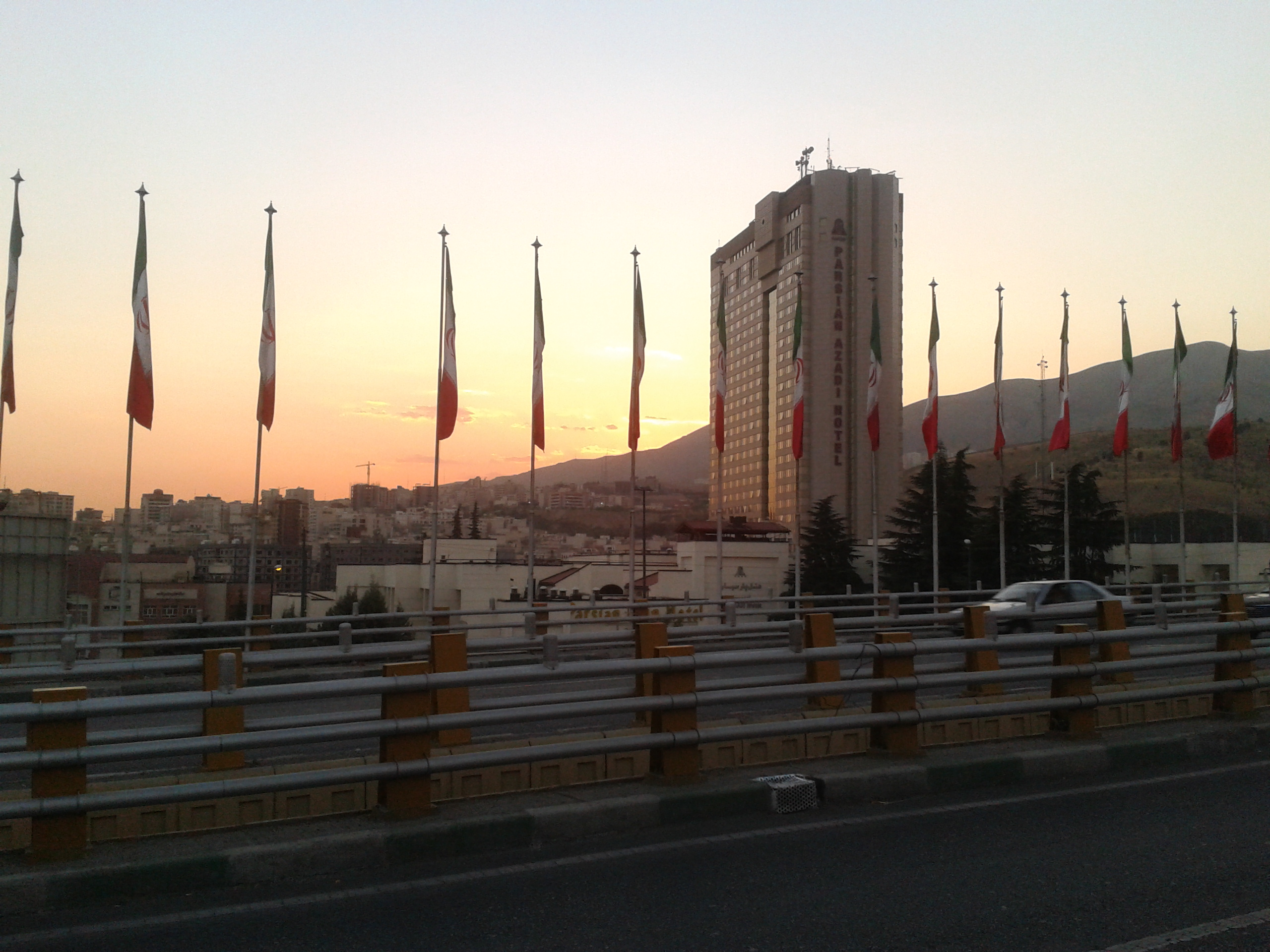
Parsian Azadi Hotel seen from Chamran Highway, August 2015

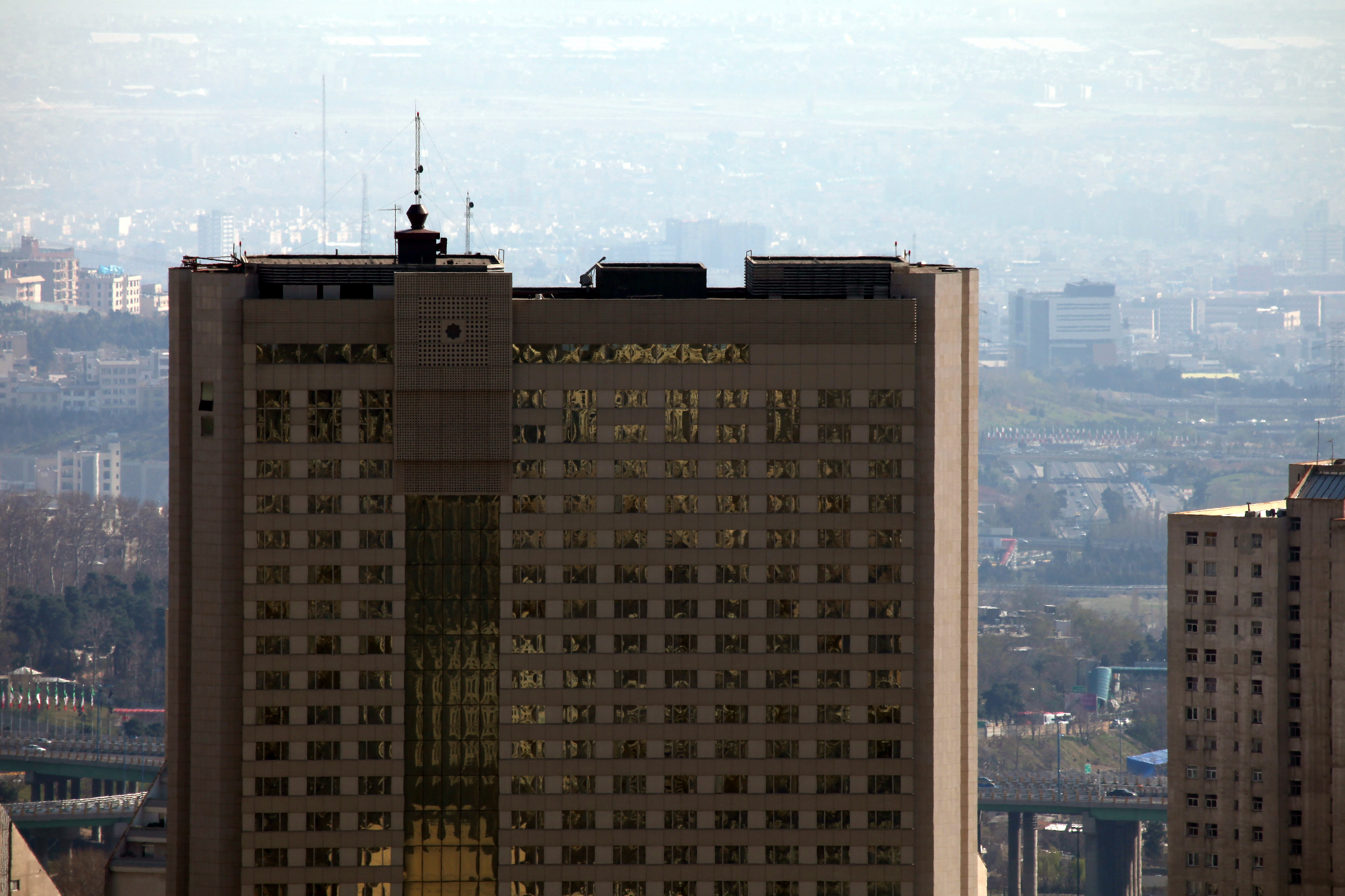
Parsian Azadi Hotel, 2014
