= Abul Kalam Azad (intellectual) =

Bangladesh mathematician (1933–1971)

- Born: 1 January 1928 (age 98); Kushtia, British India
- Died: 15 December 1971 (aged 43)
- Occupations: Mathematician, academic, martyred intellectual
- Awards: Ekushey Padak

Abul Kalam Azad (1 January 1933 - 15 December 1971) was a Bangladeshi mathematician. He was a Fellow of the Royal Meteorological Society of London, the Applied Mathematical Society of the United Kingdom, and the American Meteorological Society. During the Bangladesh Liberation War, on 15 December 1971, a group of Al Badr paramilitary personnel of the Pakistan Army abducted him from his home.

== Early life ==
Azad was born on 1 January 1933 in Ramkrishnapur village, Bheramara Upazila, Kushtia District, East Bengal, British India. He was a student of mathematics. He became the first in the first class in MSc in mathematics from Dhaka University. Azad was always very talented in his student life. He passed the post-graduate examination with a record breaking-number in applied mathematics from Dhaka University and got a gold medal.

Azad holds a diploma in fluid mechanics from the University of Manchester in the United Kingdom, an MSc in applied mathematics, and a PhD in mathematics.

== Career ==
After completing his higher education, Azad joined the Government College in November 1956 as a lecturer of mathematics. Later he taught for a long time in the mathematics department of the government Jagannath College. At one stage he became the head of the mathematics department at Jagannath College. He served in this capacity from 1968 to 1969. On 10 September 1970, he was promoted to the post of professor. In 1970, he joined the Institute for Advanced Science and Technology Teaching under Dhaka University. He taught here until he disappeared.

== Personal life ==
Unmarried Azad lived with his mother, four brothers, and four sisters in Azimpur, Dhaka. He was the eldest of the siblings. He looked after his family after his father died.

== Death ==
One day before the end of the Bangladesh Liberation War, on 15 December, Al-Badr, allied paramilitary forces of the Pakistan Army, detained him and took him to an unknown location. In 2002, he was awarded the Ekushey Padak.
