= Mohammad Abul Kalam =

Bangladeshi politician

Member of Bangladesh Parliament
- In office 18 February 1979 – 12 February 1982

Personal details
- Born: 11 September 1941 (age 84) Basikpur, Lakshmipur thana, British India
- Party: Bangladesh Nationalist Party

Mohammad Abul Kalam (Bengali: মোহাম্মদ আবুল কালাম) is a Bangladesh Nationalist Party politician and a former member of parliament for Noakhali-10.

== Biography ==
Mohammad Abul Kalam was born on 11 September 1941 in Basikpur village of what is now Lakshmipur Sadar Upazila, Lakshmipur District, Bangladesh.

Kalam was elected to parliament from Noakhali-10 as a Bangladesh Nationalist Party candidate in 1979.
