= Abul Kalam (vice-chancellor) =

- Born: 25 September 1923; Vijayawada, South India
- Died: 9 May 2013 (aged 89); Karachi, Pakistan

Engineer Abul Kalam (Urdu: ابو الکلام 25 November 1923 – 9 May 2013) was a Pakistani educator and engineer who was the longest serving vice-chancellor of the NED University of Engineering and Technology. He served between 1996 and 2013.

He died at the age of 89 in Karachi.
