= Azadi-ye Dam Ludab =

Azadi-ye Dam Ludab ازادي دم لوداب
- Village
- Location within Iran
- Coordinates: 31°00′31″N 50°46′16″E
- Country: Iran
- Province: Kohgiluyeh and Boyer-Ahmad
- County: Boyer-Ahmad
- Bakhsh: Ludab
- Rural District: Ludab

Population (2006)
  - Total: 90
- Time zone: UTC+3:30 (IRST)
  - Summer (DST): UTC+4:30 (IRDT)

Azadi-ye Dam Ludab (Persian: ازادي دم لوداب, also Romanized as Āzādī-ye Dam Lūdāb; also known as Āzādī) is a village in Ludab Rural District, Ludab District, Boyer-Ahmad County, Kohgiluyeh and Boyer-Ahmad Province, Iran. At the 2006 census, its population was 90, in 15 families.
