= Azadkhani, Khorramabad =

Azadkhani ازادخاني
- Village
- Location within Iran
- Coordinates: 33°35′46″N 48°19′21″E
- Country: Iran
- Province: Lorestan
- County: Khorramabad
- Bakhsh: Central
- Rural District: Robat

Population (2006)
  - Total: 49
- Time zone: UTC+3:30 (IRST)
  - Summer (DST): UTC+4:30 (IRDT)

Azadkhani (Persian: ازادخاني, also Romanized as Āzādkhānī; also known as Āzādī) is a village in Robat Rural District, in the Central District of Khorramabad County, Lorestan Province, Iran. At the 2006 census, its population was 49, in 10 families.
