= Azad, Goranboy =

Coordinates: 40°30′N 46°21′E

Azad is a village in the municipality of Dəyirmanlar in the Goranboy District of Azerbaijan.
