= Azadi Tower =

Building in Tehran, Iran

- Borj-e Āzādi
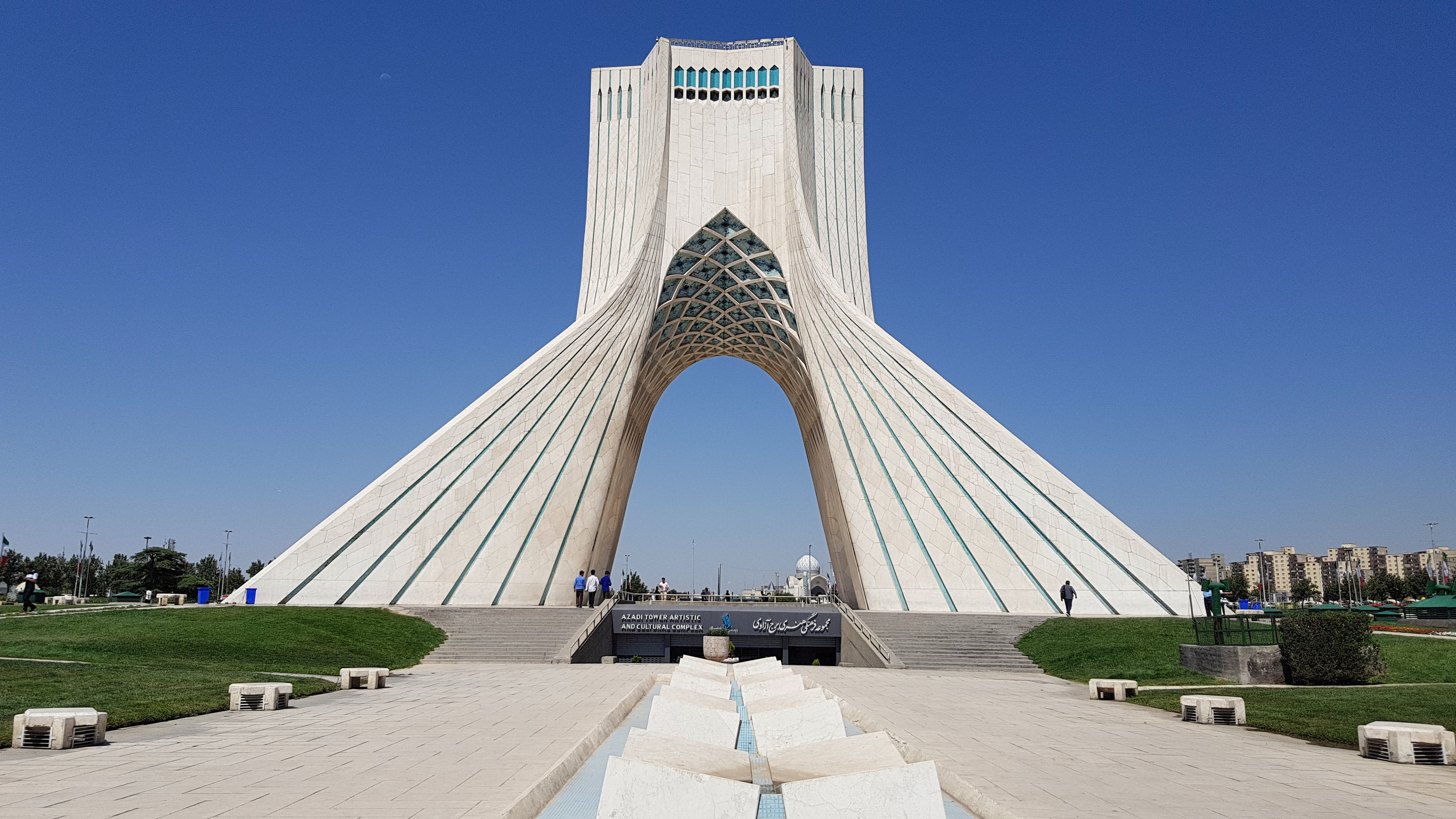
- Interactive map of the Azadi Tower area
- Former names: Shahyad Tower (tr. Shah's Memorial Tower)
- Etymology: "Freedom Tower"

General information
- Location: Tehran, Iran
- Coordinates: 35°41′58″N 51°20′16″E
- Opened: January 14, 1972
- Inaugurated: October 16, 1971
- Cost: $6 million
- Client: Council of Celebrations

Height
- Roof: 45 m (148 ft)

Design and construction
- Architect: Hossein Amanat
- Structural engineer: Ove Arup & Partners
- Main contractor: MAP Company

Website
- azadi-tower.ir?lang=english

Iran National Heritage List
- Designated: March 17, 1975
- Reference no.: 1008

The Azadi Tower (Persian: برج آزادی, romanized: Borj-e Āzādi, lit. 'Freedom Tower'), also known by its former name, the Shahyad Tower (Persian: برج شهیاد, romanized: Borj-e Šahyād, lit. 'Shah's Memorial Tower'), is a monument at Azadi Square in Tehran, Iran. It is one of Tehran's landmarks, once marking the westernmost entrance to the city, and is part of the Azadi Cultural Complex, which also includes an underground museum.

With a Persian-inspired architecture, the tower is about 45 metres (148 ft) tall and is completely clad in cut marble. It was commissioned by Mohammad Reza Pahlavi, the last Shah of Iran, to mark the 2,500-year celebration of the Persian Empire and was completed in 1971.

After winning a competition, architect Hossein Amanat was tasked to design the tower. His ideas were based upon Iran's classical and post-classical architecture, popular influences on art in the 1960s following the White Revolution.

== History ==
=== Name ===
The first name associated with this monument was Darvāze-ye Kuroš ("Gate of Cyrus"), and at the time of the Centenary Celebrations, Asadollah Alam, who chaired the Council of Celebrations, referred to the monument as Darvāze-ye Šāhanšāhi ("Imperial Gate"). The monument's ultimate official name was decided before the announcement of the competition for the monument's design in September 1966. Bahram Farahvashi, a scholar and professor of ancient Iranian languages who worked with the Council of Celebrations, came up with the officially designated name of the structure, Šahyād Āryāmehr. Built in 1971 in commemoration of the 2,500th year of the foundation of the Persian Empire, this "gateway into Tehran" was named the Šahyād ("Shah's Memorial") in honor of the Shah (Mohammad Reza Pahlavi), but was later renamed Āzādi ("Freedom") following the 1979 revolution.

=== Construction ===
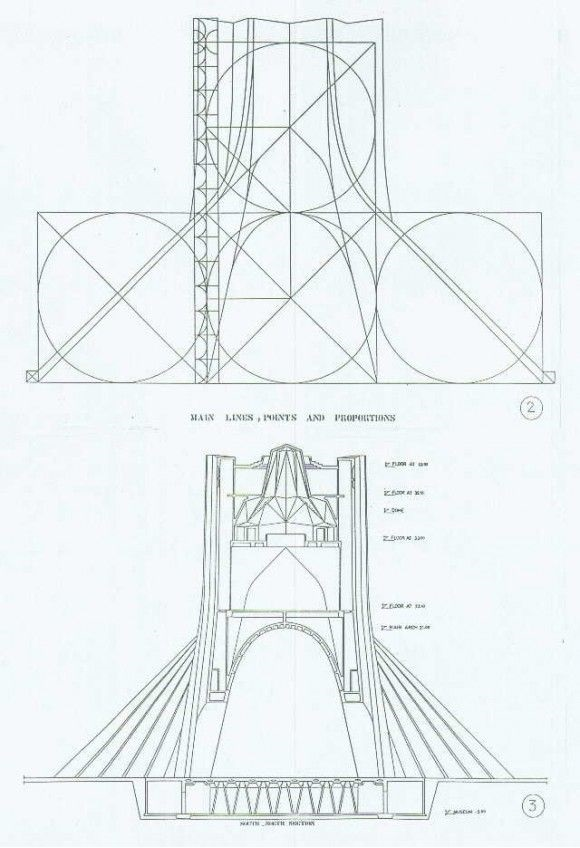
Plans of the Shahyad Tower.

During the 1960s, Iran became a major oil-exporting country, and using the newly-found wealth, the Shah launched programs to modernize and industrialize the country. This followed a cultural growth that architect Hossein Amanat describes as "a mini renaissance". In 1966, Amanat won a competition to design the building.

Due to governmental concerns, Amanat was required to sign underneath contracts "on condition of the approval of the Council of Celebrations", which would serve as the client. Amanat planned to contract the British company of Arup to assist in the structural design of the tower, as he was impressed by their contributions towards the design and construction of the Sydney Opera House. He initially faced opposition from the head of the council, as well as several conservative and nationalistic Iranian engineers, as he was turning to a foreign engineer for assistance. Despite that, the Shah supported Amanat, sending a letter to the council which would leave the decision to the architect. Shahbanu Farah Pahlavi was also supportive of Amanat's decisions.

Amanat told the BBC World News in an interview that "overall, the building starts from the base and moves up towards the sky." He states that he was inspired to design the tower in this way because he felt that Iran "should be moving towards a higher level." According to him, the main vault is a Sasanian arch representing the classical era, while the broken arch above it is a popular medieval form of arch representing the post-classical era. The "network of ribs", which connects the arches together, would represent the connection between classical and post-classical Iran.

Built with white marble from Isfahan province, the monument includes 8,000 blocks of stone. The stones were all located and supplied by Ghanbar Rahimi, who was well known for his extensive knowledge of quarries, often known as the Soltān-e Sang-e Irān ("Iran's Sultan of Stone"). Computers were used to "define its complex woven surfaces," which, at the time, was a new technological technique. The main contractor for the construction of the tower was the MAP Company, supervised by Ghaffar Davarpanah Varnosfaderani, a renowned Iranian stonemason. The project was mainly funded by a group of five hundred Iranian industrialists. According to a report by MEED, the construction cost about six million dollars.

On 16 October 1971, the inauguration of the tower took place. However, it was not until 14 January 1972, that the tower was open to the public.

== Azadi Tower Museum ==
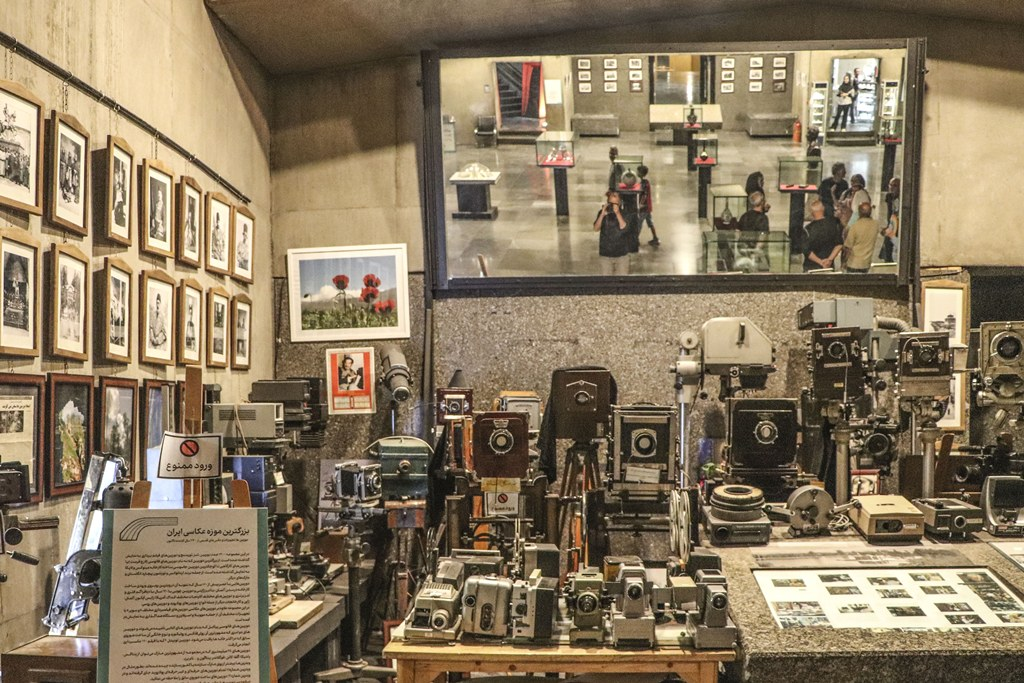
Collection of old cameras and equipment

The Azadi Museum is located at the basement level. Among the earliest items on display are square flagstones, gold sheeting, and terracotta tablets from Susa covered with cuneiform characters. The museum also features a section of old cameras and equipment dedicated to the history of photography in Iran.

Before the 1979 Revolution, the main display was occupied by a copy of the Cyrus Cylinder, the original being kept at the British Museum. Next to the Cyrus Cylinder was a gold plaque commemorating the original presentation of the museum to Mohammad Reza Pahlavi by the Mayor of Tehran. Pottery, ceramics, varnished porcelain (such as a seventh-century blue and gold dish from Gorgan), an illuminated Quran, and miniatures highlighted milestones in the country's history up to the 19th century, which were represented by two painted panels from Empress and the structure was to represent Farah Pahlavi as in is stated in some ancient texts.

The building now hosts a Cinematheque and was described in the Tehran Times as follows: "It is one of the landmarks of Tehran, marking the west entrance to the city, and is part of the Azadi Cultural and Artistic Complex, which also includes an underground museum."

== Events ==
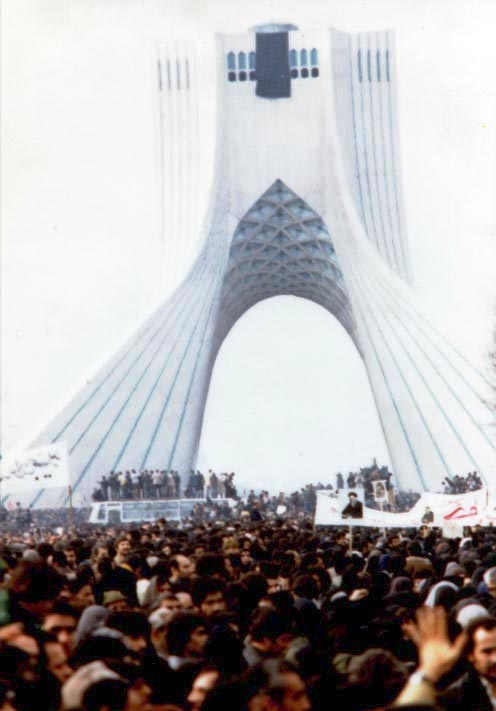
Azadi Tower during the 1979 Iranian revolution

=== Audiovisual theatre (1971) ===
The original show, devised in 1971, was replaced in 1975 by a new one which invited visitors to discover Iran's geographic and natural diversity along with its fundamental historical elements. It exhibited a number of national achievements, technical undertakings, calligraphed poems, and miniature paintings. The project, devised by a Czechoslovak company, required 12,000 metres of film, 20,000 color slides, 20 movie projectors, and 120 slide projectors. The audiovisual programmes were directed by professor Jaroslav Frič (1928–2000). Five computers operated the entire system.

=== Gate of Words light show (2015) ===
German artist Philipp Geist organized a projection mapping installation named Gate of Words at the Azadi Tower, on the occasion of the German Unity Day. The show was held from October 3 to 5, 2015.

In this project, the artist visualized the topics of freedom, peace, space and time in a poetical manner. Geist developed a light installation made of colored words and concepts in different languages, and abstract painterly compositions of images. The glowing words were in English, German and Persian, moving in synchronization with live music on the walls of the tower.

== Gallery ==
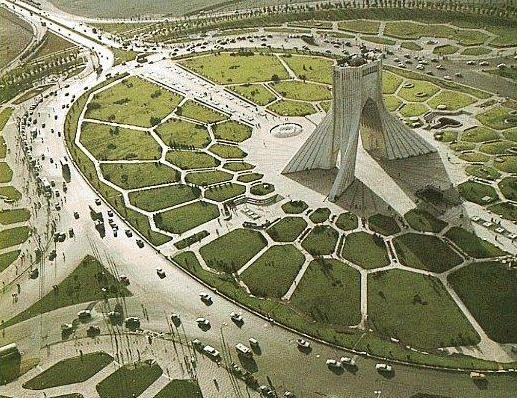
Shahyad Square in 1971

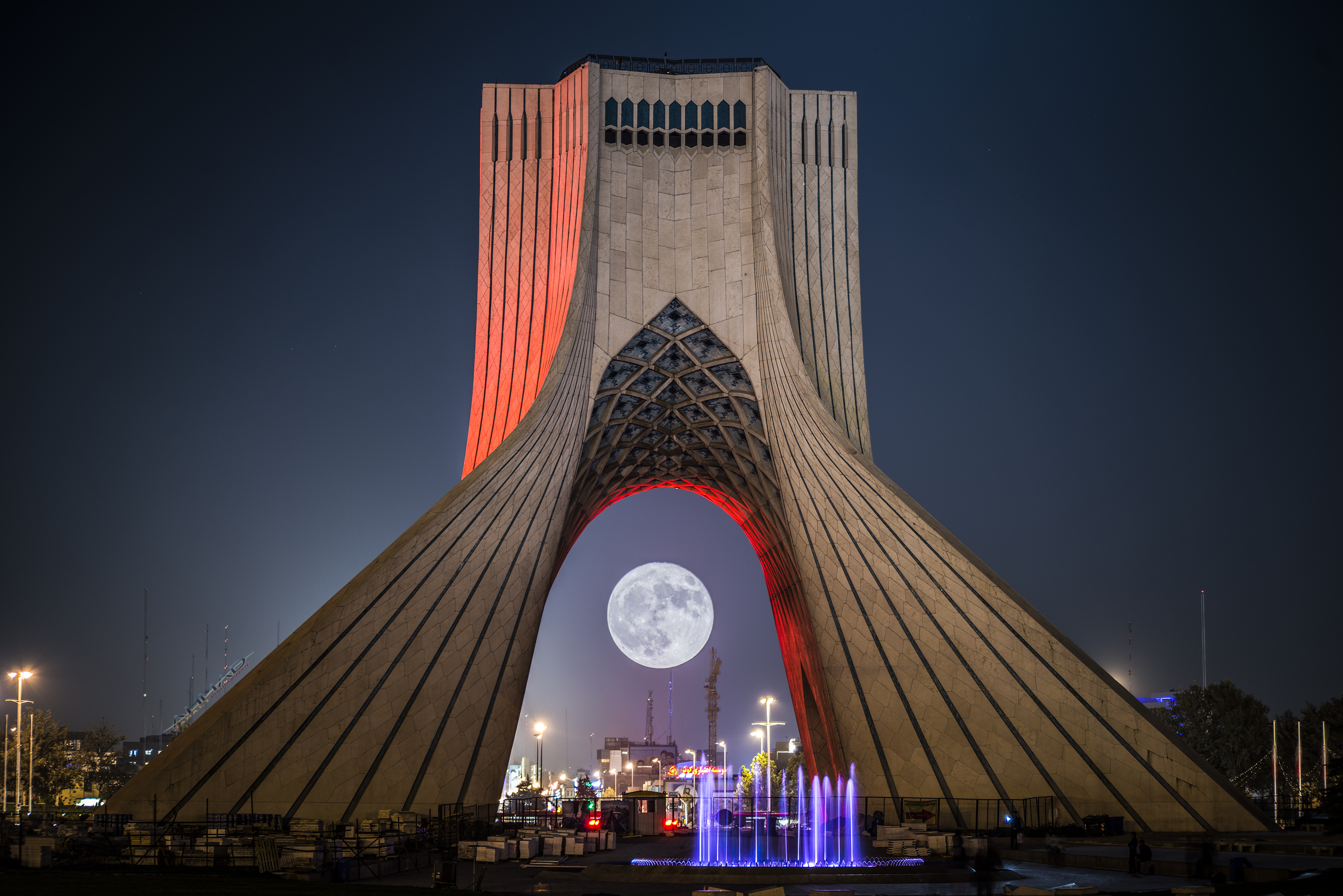
Azadi Tower during a full moon

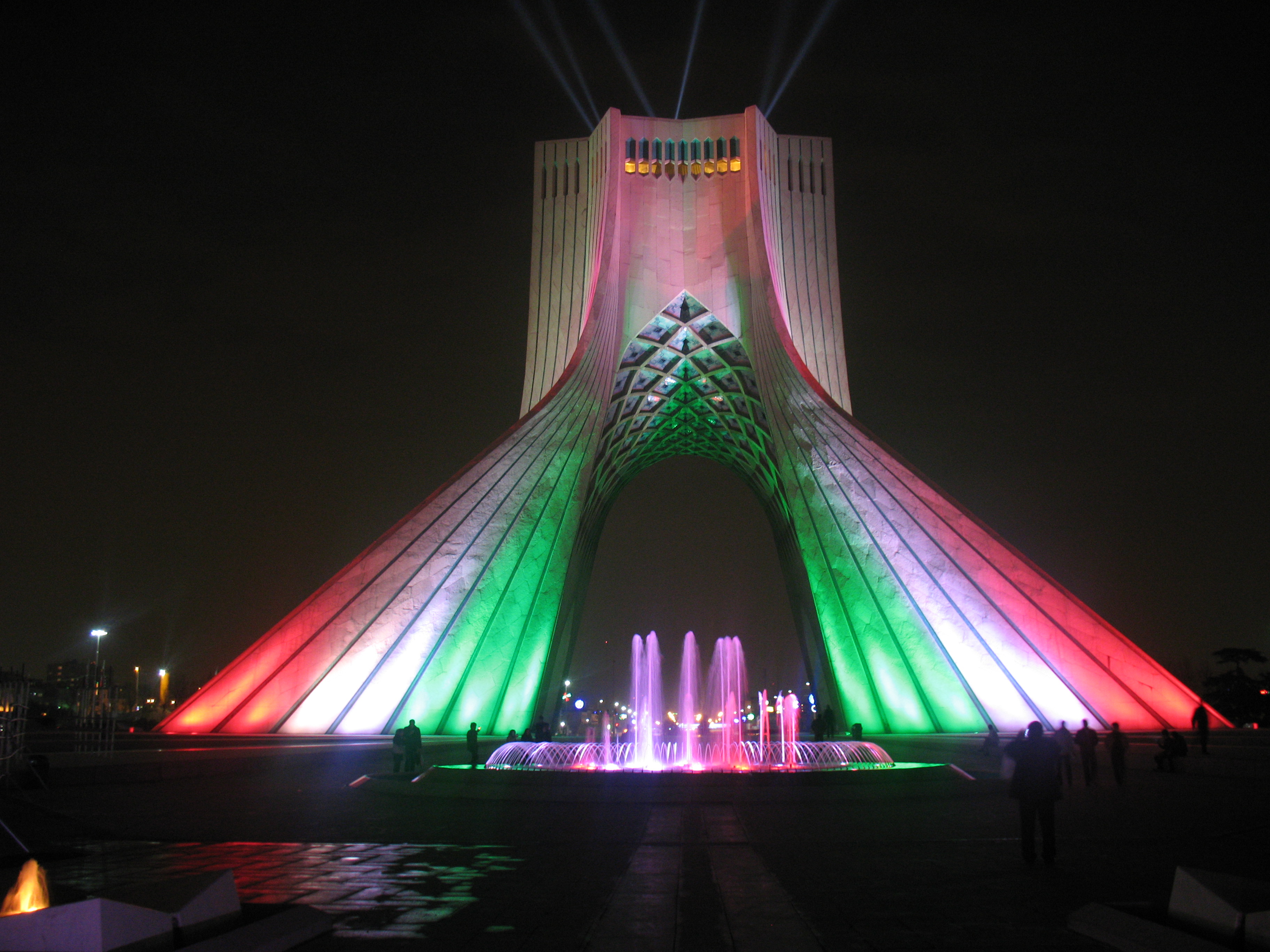
The tower in colors of the Iranian flag

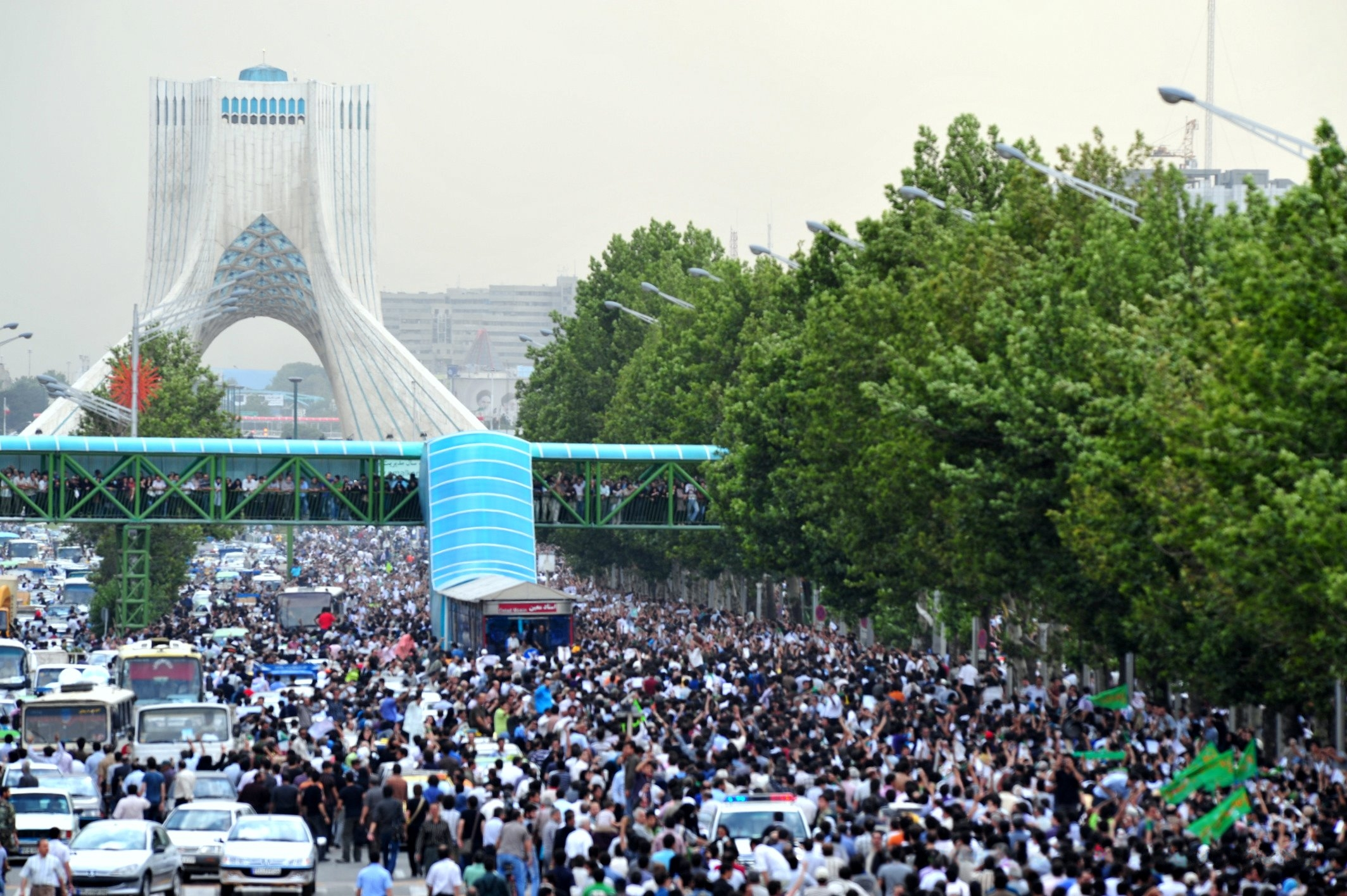
The tower during the 2009 presidential election protests

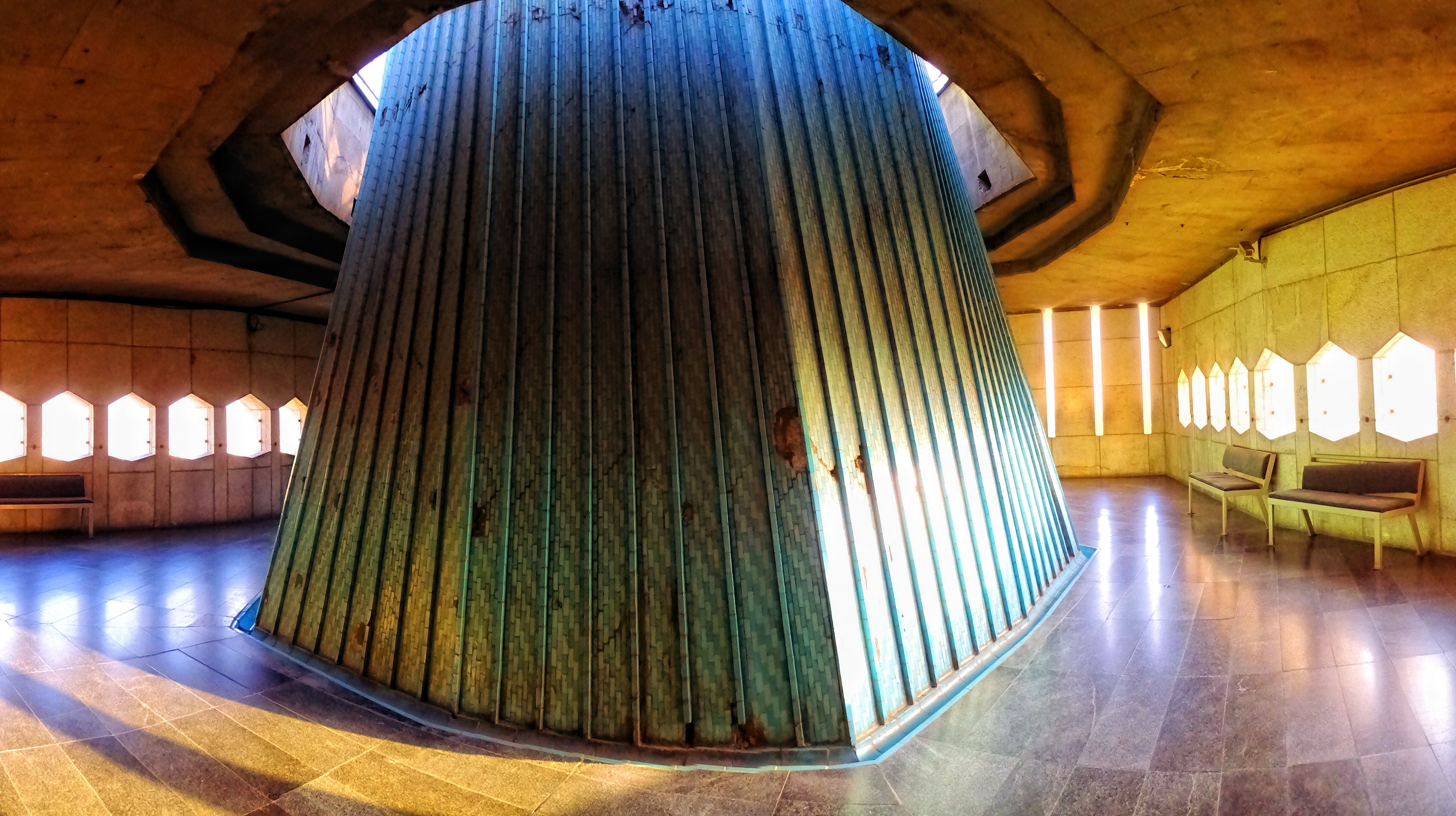
The Azadi Tower observation deck

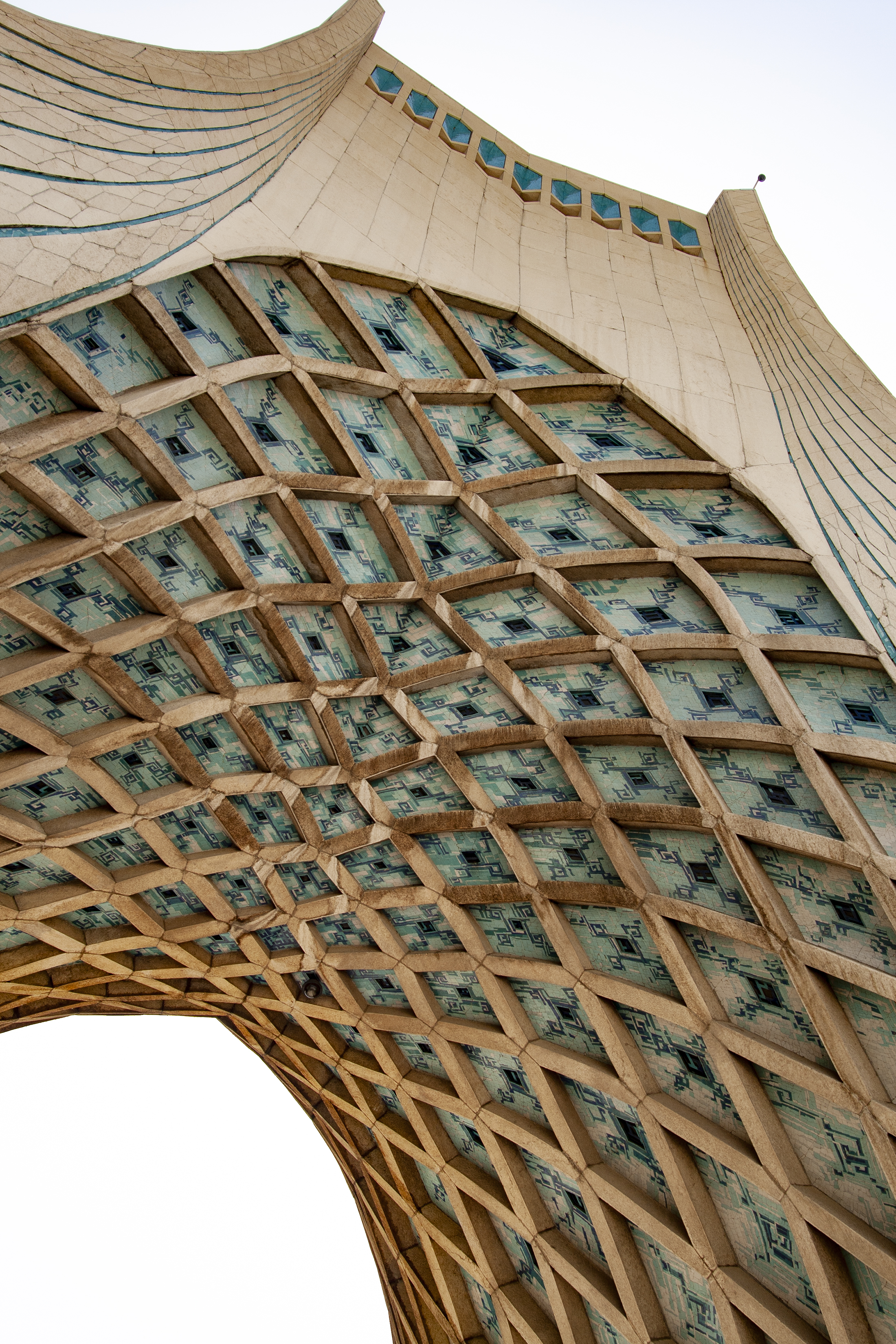
A low-angle view of the tower

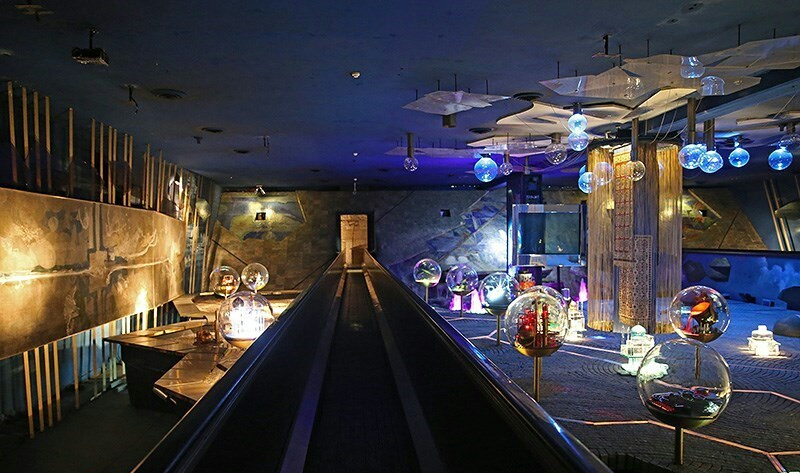
Inside the Azadi museum

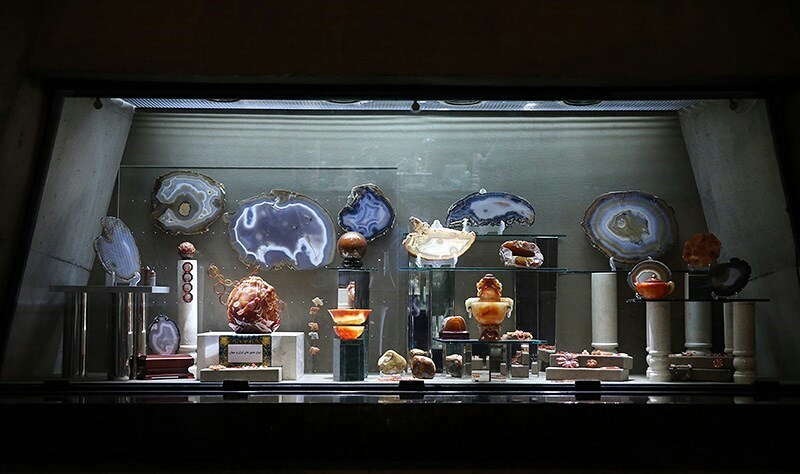
Inside the Azadi museum

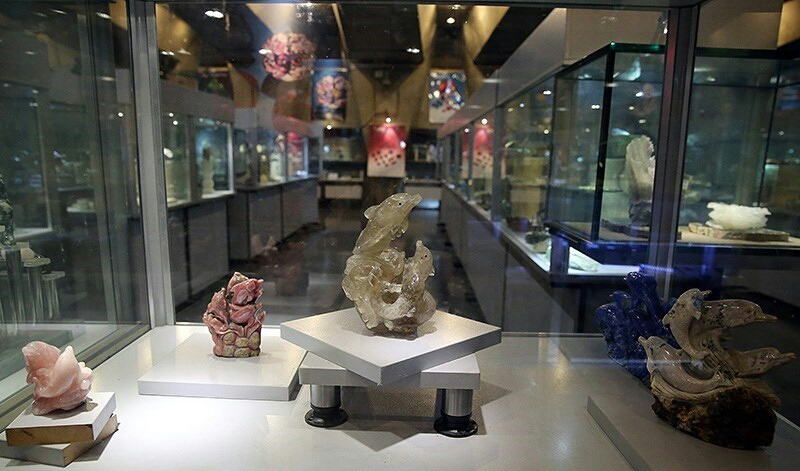
Inside the Azadi museum

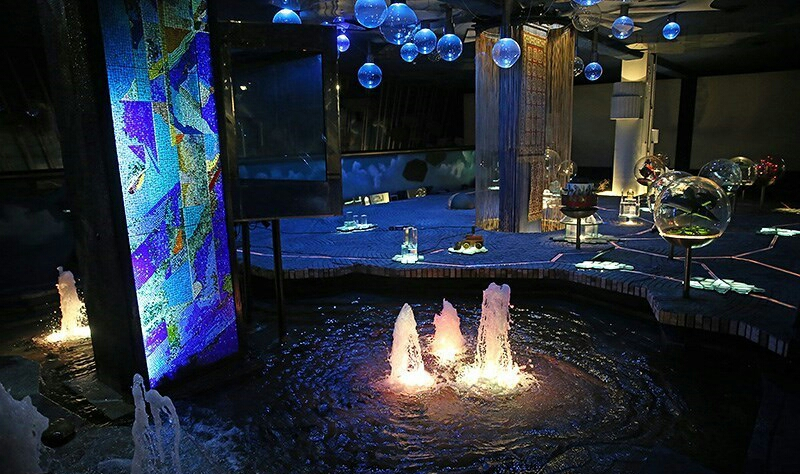
Inside the Azadi museum

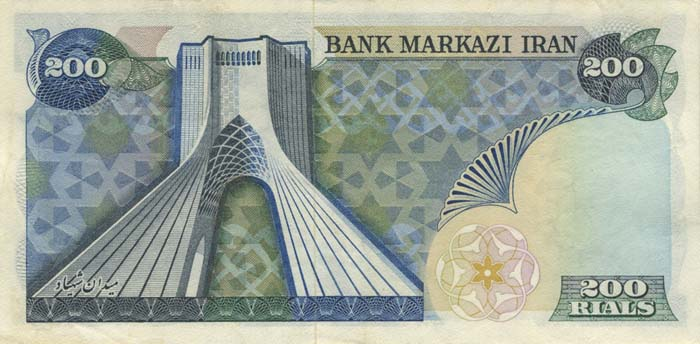
Azadi Tower on the reverse of a 1974 200-Iranian rial banknote

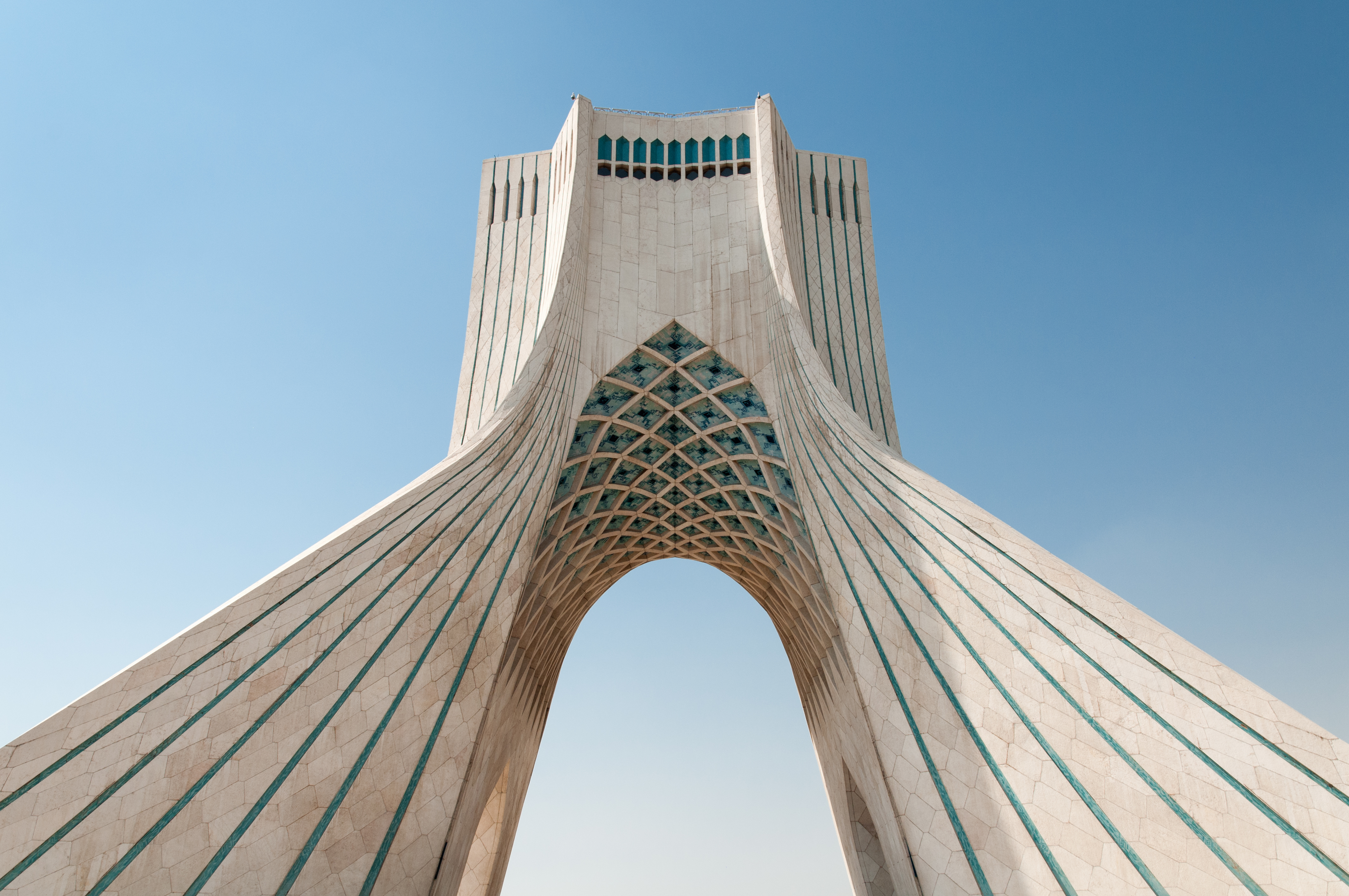
View of the tower

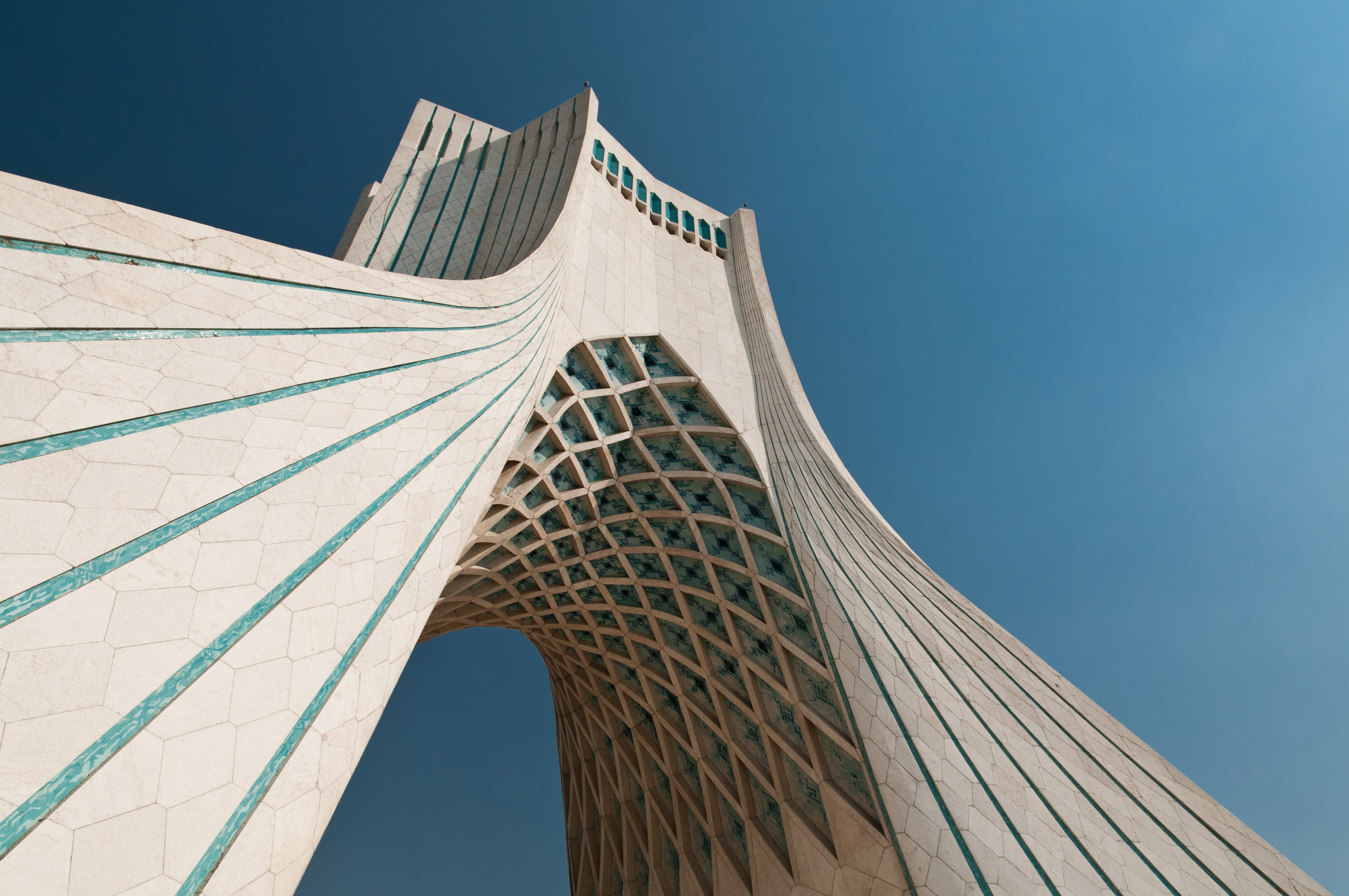
View of the tower

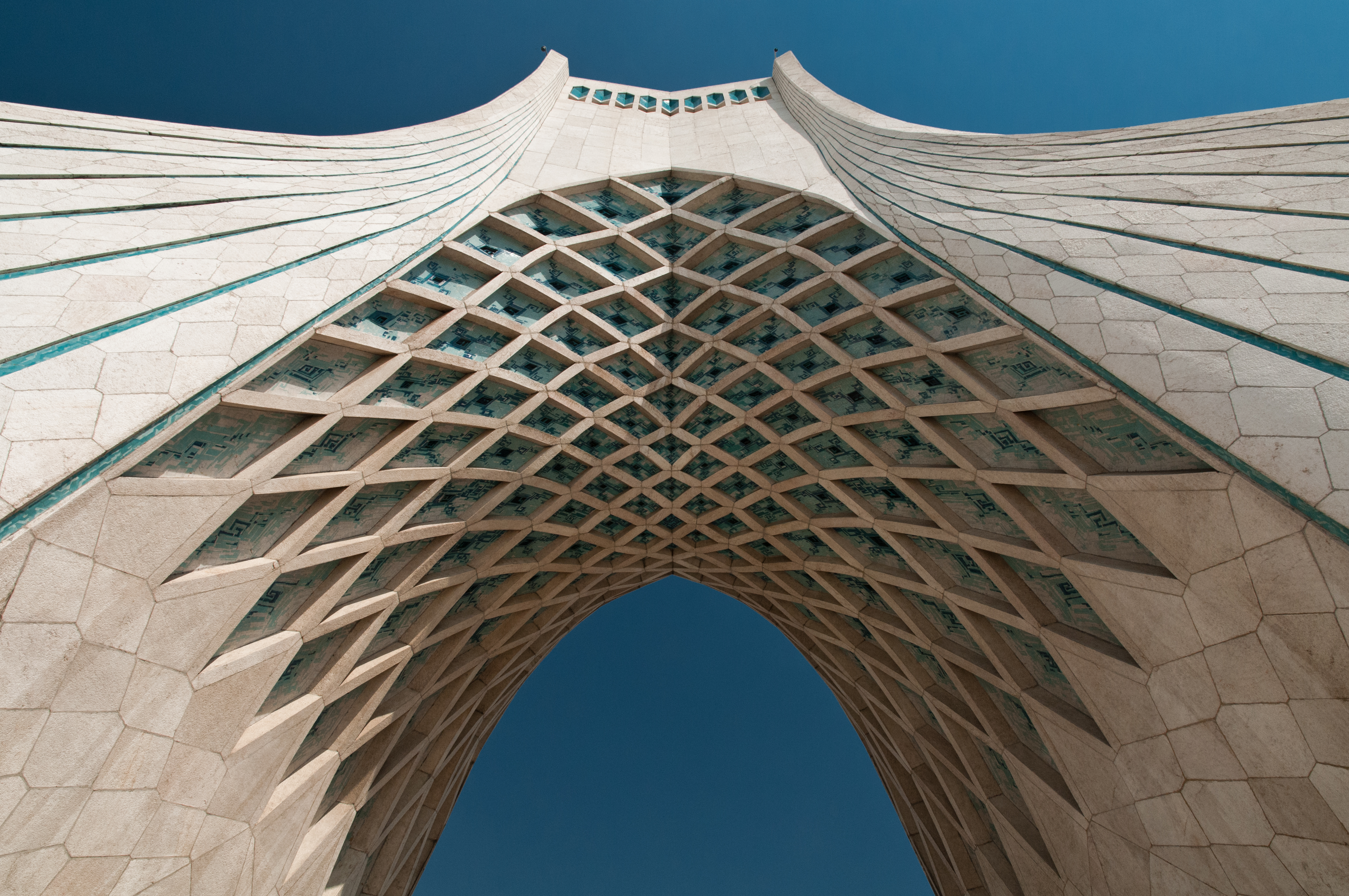
View of the tower

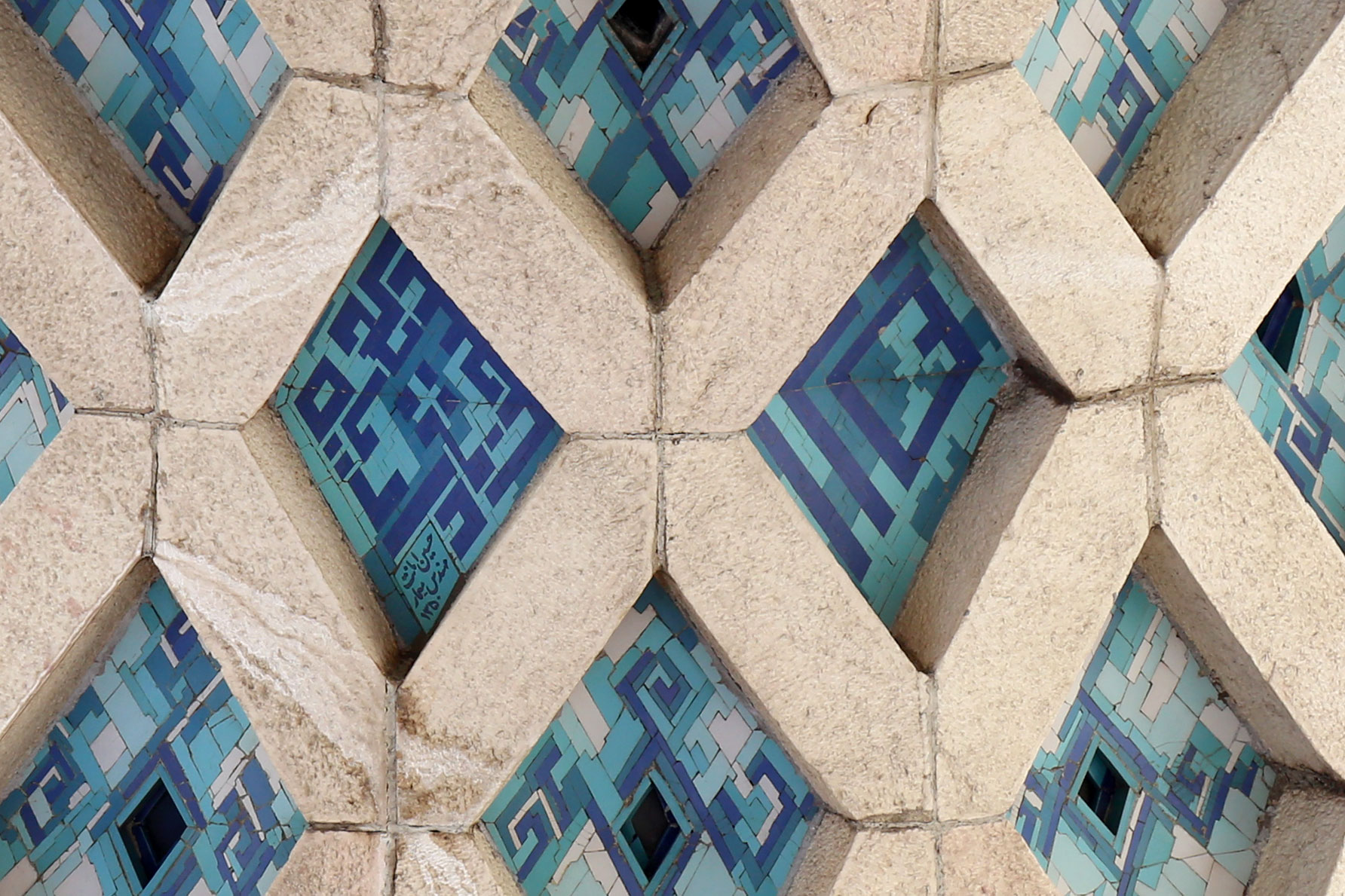
Detail of the tile work underneath the arch with texts including the name of architect and the construction date

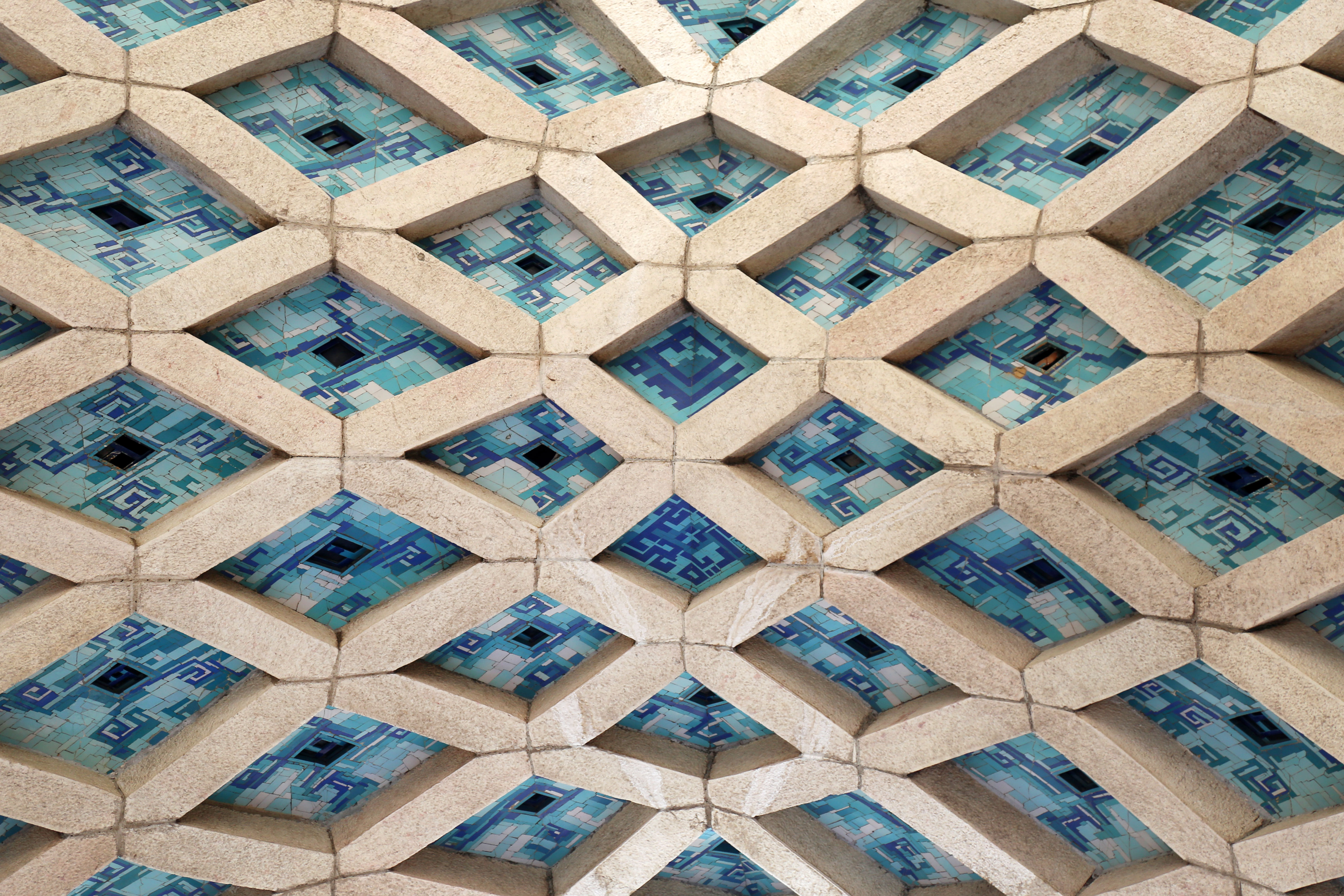
Azadi Tower, Tehran, Iran

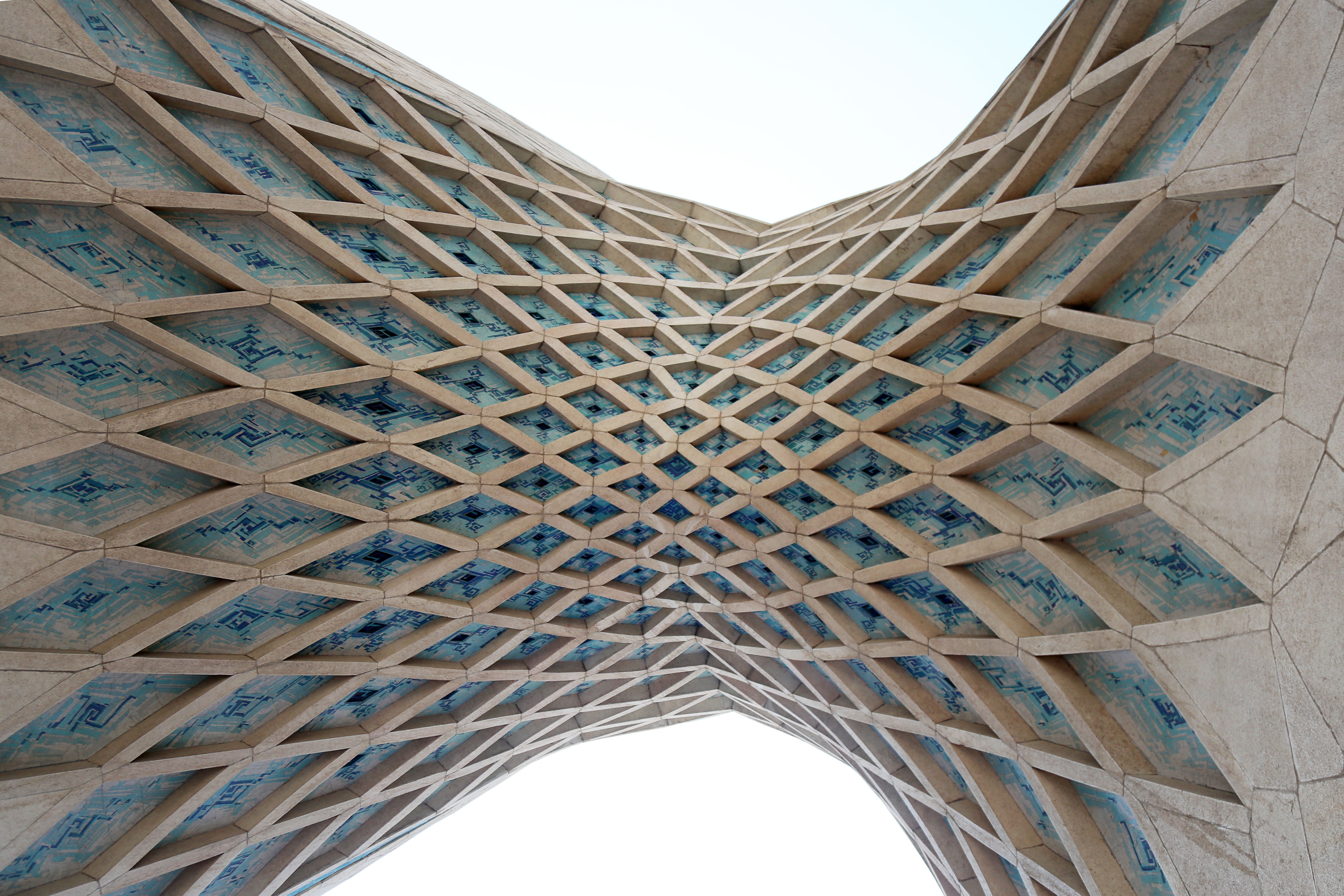
Azadi Tower, Tehran, Iran

== Junctions ==
- Saidi Expressway
- Karaj Special Road
- Mohammad Ali Jenah Expressway
- Azadi Street

== See also ==
- Milad Tower
- Iranian architecture
- Martyrs' Memorial, Algiers
