= Sarani =

Sarani may refer to:

- Sarani, Iran, a village
- Sarani, Dust Mohammad, Sistan and Baluchestan Province, Iran, a village
- Sarani, Margan, Sistan and Baluchestan Province, Iran, a village
- Mother Teresa Sarani or Park Street, a major thoroughfare in Kolkata, India

== See also ==
- Sarani-ye Bala, Kerman Province, Iran
- Sarani-ye Pain, Kerman Province, Iran
- Šarani (disambiguation)
- Serani (disambiguation)
- Lucio Serrani (born 1961), Italian retired hammer thrower
- Serrani, members of the Serranus family in the ancient Roman Atilia gens
- Šurany, Slovakia, a town
  - ŠK Šurany, a football club based in the town
