= Ali Khan, Iran =

Ali Khan (Persian: عليخان) in Iran may refer to:

- Ali Khan, Sistan and Baluchestan
- Ali Khan-e Kachkul, Sistan and Baluchestan Province
- Ali Khan-e Zaman, Sistan and Baluchestan Province
- Ali Khan, alternate name of Deh Now-e Ali Khan, Sistan and Baluchestan Province
