= Molla Dust Mohammad =

Molla Dust Mohammad ملادوست محمد
- Village
- Country: Iran
- Province: Sistan and Baluchestan
- County: Hirmand
- Bakhsh: Central
- Rural District: Dust Mohammad

Population (2006)
  - Total: 133
- Time zone: UTC+3:30 (IRST)
  - Summer (DST): UTC+4:30 (IRDT)

Molla Dust Mohammad (Persian: ملادوست محمد, also Romanized as Mollā Dūst Moḩammad) is a village in Dust Mohammad Rural District, in the Central District of Hirmand County, Sistan and Baluchestan Province, Iran. At the 2006 census, its population was 133, in 35 families.
