= Karim Koshteh =

Karim Koshteh كريم كشته
- Village
- Location within Iran
- Coordinates: 31°09′59″N 61°44′42″E
- Country: Iran
- Province: Sistan and Baluchestan
- County: Hirmand
- Bakhsh: Central
- Rural District: Dust Mohammad

Population (2006)
  - Total: 650
- Time zone: UTC+3:30 (IRST)
  - Summer (DST): UTC+4:30 (IRDT)

Karim Koshteh (Persian: كريم كشته, also Romanized as Karīm Koshteh) is a village in Dust Mohammad Rural District, in the Central District of Hirmand County, Sistan and Baluchestan Province, Iran. At the 2006 census, its population was 650, in 146 families.
