= Dow Kalleh =

Dow Kalleh دوكله
- Village
- Location within Iran
- Coordinates: 31°00′04″N 61°46′50″E
- Country: Iran
- Province: Sistan and Baluchestan
- County: Hirmand
- Bakhsh: Central
- Rural District: Jahanabad

Population (2006)
  - Total: 214
- Time zone: UTC+3:30 (IRST)
  - Summer (DST): UTC+4:30 (IRDT)

Dow Kalleh (Persian: دوكله; also known as Ḩājjī Do Kalleh) is a village in Jahanabad Rural District, in the Central District of Hirmand County, Sistan and Baluchestan Province, Iran. At the 2006 census, its population was 214, in 43 families.
