= Qus ol Din Bamadi =

Qus ol Din Bamadi قوس الدين بامدي
- Village
- Country: Iran
- Province: Sistan and Baluchestan
- County: Hirmand
- Bakhsh: Central
- Rural District: Dust Mohammad

Population (2006)
  - Total: 115
- Time zone: UTC+3:30 (IRST)
  - Summer (DST): UTC+4:30 (IRDT)

Qus ol Din Bamadi (Persian: قوس الدين بامدي, also Romanized as Qūs ol Dīn Bāmadī) is a village in Dust Mohammad Rural District, in the Central District of Hirmand County, Sistan and Baluchestan Province, Iran. At the 2006 census, its population was 115, in 20 families.
