= Pakak Hajji Heydar =

Pakak Hajji Heydar پكك حاجي حيدر
- Village
- Country: Iran
- Province: Sistan and Baluchestan
- County: Hirmand
- Bakhsh: Central
- Rural District: Jahanabad

Population (2006)
  - Total: 495
- Time zone: UTC+3:30 (IRST)
  - Summer (DST): UTC+4:30 (IRDT)

Pakak Hajji Heydar (Persian: پكك حاجي حيدر, also romanized as Pakak Ḩājjī Ḩeydar) is a village in Jahanabad Rural District, in the Central District of Hirmand County, Sistan and Baluchestan Province, Iran. At the 2006 census, its population was 495, in 99 families.
