= Molla Karim-e Bar Ahui =

Molla Karim-e Bar Ahui ملا کریم براهویی
- Village
- Location within Iran
- Coordinates: 31°08′31″N 61°42′58″E
- Country: Iran
- Province: Sistan and Baluchestan
- County: Hirmand
- Bakhsh: Central
- Rural District: Margan

Population (2006)
  - Total: 31
- Time zone: UTC+3:30 (IRST)
  - Summer (DST): UTC+4:30 (IRDT)

Molla Karim-e Bar Ahui (Persian: ملا کریم براهویی, also Romanized as Mollā Karīm-e Bar Āhū’ī) is a village in Margan Rural District, in the Central District of Hirmand County, Sistan and Baluchestan Province, Iran. At the 2006 census, its population was 31, in 7 families.
