= Deh-e Samad =

Deh-e Samad ده صمد
- Village
- Location within Iran
- Coordinates: 31°04′02″N 61°40′13″E
- Country: Iran
- Province: Sistan and Baluchestan
- County: Hirmand
- Bakhsh: Central
- Rural District: Jahanabad

Population (2006)
  - Total: 107
- Time zone: UTC+3:30 (IRST)
  - Summer (DST): UTC+4:30 (IRDT)

Deh-e Samad (Persian: ده صمد, also Romanized as Deh-e Şamad) is a village in Jahanabad Rural District, in the Central District of Hirmand County, Sistan and Baluchestan Province, Iran. At the 2006 census, its population was 107, in 17 families.
