= Mandilan-e Bala =

Mandilan-e Bala منديلان بالا
- Village
- Location within Iran
- Coordinates: 31°02′16″N 61°44′55″E
- Country: Iran
- Province: Sistan and Baluchestan
- County: Hirmand
- Bakhsh: Central
- Rural District: Jahanabad

Population (2006)
  - Total: 64
- Time zone: UTC+3:30 (IRST)
  - Summer (DST): UTC+4:30 (IRDT)

Mandilan-e Bala (Persian: منديلان بالا, also Romanized as Mandīlān-e Bālā; also known as Mandīlān) is a village in Jahanabad Rural District, in the Central District of Hirmand County, Sistan and Baluchestan Province, Iran. At the 2006 census, its population was 64, in 15 families.
