= Deh-e Nur Mohammad Safarzayi =

Deh-e Nur Mohammad Safarzayi ده نورمحمدصفرزايي
- Village
- Country: Iran
- Province: Sistan and Baluchestan
- County: Hirmand
- Bakhsh: Central
- Rural District: Dust Mohammad

Population (2006)
  - Total: 352
- Time zone: UTC+3:30 (IRST)
  - Summer (DST): UTC+4:30 (IRDT)

Deh-e Nur Mohammad Safarzayi (Persian: ده نورمحمدصفرزايي, also Romanized as Deh-e Nūr Moḩammad Şafarzāyī) is a village in Dust Mohammad Rural District, in the Central District of Hirmand County, Sistan and Baluchestan Province, Iran. At the 2006 census, its population was 352, in 64 families.
