= Dadkhoda-ye Sasuli =

Dadkhoda-ye Sasuli داد خدا سا سولي
- Village
- Location within Iran
- Coordinates: 30°57′05″N 61°41′30″E
- Country: Iran
- Province: Sistan and Baluchestan
- County: Hirmand
- Bakhsh: Central
- Rural District: Dust Mohammad

Population (2006)
  - Total: 430
- Time zone: UTC+3:30 (IRST)
  - Summer (DST): UTC+4:30 (IRDT)

Dadkhoda-ye Sasuli (Persian: داد خدا سا سولي, also Romanized as Dādkhodā-ye Sāsūlī; also known as Dādkhodā-ye Golmīr) is a village in Dust Mohammad Rural District, in the Central District of Hirmand County, Sistan and Baluchestan Province, Iran. At the 2006 census, its population was 430, in 84 families.
