= Kartakeh =

Kartakeh كرتكه
- Village
- Location within Iran
- Coordinates: 30°54′37″N 61°33′25″E
- Country: Iran
- Province: Sistan and Baluchestan
- County: Hirmand
- Bakhsh: Central
- Rural District: Dust Mohammad

Population (2006)
  - Total: 66
- Time zone: UTC+3:30 (IRST)
  - Summer (DST): UTC+4:30 (IRDT)

Kartakeh (Persian: كرتكه; also known as Kondorak) is a village in Dust Mohammad Rural District, in the Central District of Hirmand County, Sistan and Baluchestan Province, Iran. At the 2006 census, its population was 66, in 13 families.
