= Deh-e Sargazi =

Deh-e Sargazi ده سرگزي
- Village
- Country: Iran
- Province: Sistan and Baluchestan
- County: Hirmand
- Bakhsh: Central
- Rural District: Margan

Population (2006)
  - Total: 383
- Time zone: UTC+3:30 (IRST)
  - Summer (DST): UTC+4:30 (IRDT)

Deh-e Sargazi (Persian: ده سرگزي, also Romanized as Deh-e Sargazī) is a village in Margan Rural District, in the Central District of Hirmand County, Sistan and Baluchestan Province, Iran. At the 2006 census, its population was 383, in 74 families.
