= Molla Dadkhoda Isa Zehi =

Molla Dadkhoda Isa Zehi ملا دادخدا عيسي زهي
- Village
- Country: Iran
- Province: Sistan and Baluchestan
- County: Hirmand
- Bakhsh: Central
- Rural District: Jahanabad

Population (2006)
  - Total: 59
- Time zone: UTC+3:30 (IRST)
  - Summer (DST): UTC+4:30 (IRDT)

Molla Dadkhoda Isa Zehi (Persian: ملا دادخدا عيسي زهي, also Romanized as Mollā Dādkhodā ʿĪsá Zehī) is a village in Jahanabad Rural District, in the Central District of Hirmand County, Sistan and Baluchestan Province, Iran. At the 2006 census, its population was 59, in 14 families.
