= Khan Mohammad, Iran =

Khan Mohammad خان محمد
- Village
- Location within Iran
- Coordinates: 31°08′37″N 61°44′49″E
- Country: Iran
- Province: Sistan and Baluchestan
- County: Hirmand
- Bakhsh: Central
- Rural District: Dust Mohammad

Population (2006)
  - Total: 175
- Time zone: UTC+3:30 (IRST)
  - Summer (DST): UTC+4:30 (IRDT)

Khan Mohammad (Persian: خان محمد, also Romanized as Khān Moḩammad) is a village in Dust Mohammad Rural District, in the Central District of Hirmand County, Sistan and Baluchestan Province, Iran. At the 2006 census, its population was 175, in 41 families.
