= Deh-e Nazar Isa Zahi =

Deh-e Nazar Isa Zahi ده نظر عيسي زهي
- Village
- Location within Iran
- Coordinates: 31°07′15″N 61°42′11″E
- Country: Iran
- Province: Sistan and Baluchestan
- County: Hirmand
- Bakhsh: Central
- Rural District: Margan

Population (2006)
  - Total: 104
- Time zone: UTC+3:30 (IRST)
  - Summer (DST): UTC+4:30 (IRDT)

Deh-e Nazar Isa Zahi (Persian: ده نظر عيسي زهي, also Romanized as Deh-e Naz̧ar ‘Īsā Zahī; also known as Naz̧ar Sharīf) is a village in Margan Rural District, in the Central District of Hirmand County, Sistan and Baluchestan Province, Iran. At the 2006 census, its population was 104, with 20 families.
