= Musa Kuhkan =

Musa Kuhkan موسي كوهكن
- Village
- Location within Iran
- Coordinates: 31°07′27″N 61°44′15″E
- Country: Iran
- Province: Sistan and Baluchestan
- County: Hirmand
- Bakhsh: Central
- Rural District: Margan

Population (2006)
  - Total: 163
- Time zone: UTC+3:30 (IRST)
  - Summer (DST): UTC+4:30 (IRDT)

Musa Kuhkan (Persian: موسي كوهكن, also Romanized as Mūsá Kūhkan; also known as Deh-e Mūsá Kūkān) is a village in Margan Rural District, in the Central District of Hirmand County, Sistan and Baluchestan Province, Iran. At the 2006 census, its population was 163, in 36 families.
