= Zeh-e Ruzehi =

Zeh-e Ruzehi زهروزهي
- Village
- Location within Iran
- Coordinates: 31°10′50″N 61°37′22″E
- Country: Iran
- Province: Sistan and Baluchestan
- County: Hirmand
- Bakhsh: Central
- Rural District: Margan

Population (2006)
  - Total: 472
- Time zone: UTC+3:30 (IRST)
  - Summer (DST): UTC+4:30 (IRDT)

Zeh-e Ruzehi (Persian: زهروزهي, also Romanized as Zeh-e Rūzeh’ī and Zehrūzehī) is a village in Margan Rural District, in the Central District of Hirmand County, Sistan and Baluchestan Province, Iran. At the 2006 census, its population was 472, in 86 families.
