= Majid Isa Zahi =

Majid Isa Zahi مجيد عيسي زهي
- Village
- Country: Iran
- Province: Sistan and Baluchestan
- County: Hirmand
- Bakhsh: Central
- Rural District: Margan

Population (2006)
  - Total: 43
- Time zone: UTC+3:30 (IRST)
  - Summer (DST): UTC+4:30 (IRDT)

Majid Isa Zahi (Persian: مجيد عيسي زهي, also Romanized as Majīd ʿĪsá Zahī) is a village in Margan Rural District, in the Central District of Hirmand County, Sistan and Baluchestan Province, Iran. At the time of the 2006 census, its population was 43 from 10 different families.
