= Hoseyn Safdar =

Hoseyn Safdar حسين صفدر
- Village
- Country: Iran
- Province: Sistan and Baluchestan
- County: Hirmand
- Bakhsh: Central
- Rural District: Margan

Population (2006)
  - Total: 269
- Time zone: UTC+3:30 (IRST)
  - Summer (DST): UTC+4:30 (IRDT)

Hoseyn Safdar (Persian: حسين صفدر, also Romanized as Ḩoseyn Şafdar) is a village in Margan Rural District, in the Central District of Hirmand County, Sistan and Baluchestan Province, Iran. At the 2006 census, its population was 269, in 53 families.
