= Deh-e Mirza Ali =

Deh-e Mirza Ali ده ميرزا علي
- Village
- Location within Iran
- Coordinates: 31°03′30″N 61°47′39″E
- Country: Iran
- Province: Sistan and Baluchestan
- County: Hirmand
- Bakhsh: Central
- Rural District: Dust Mohammad

Population (2006)
  - Total: 104
- Time zone: UTC+3:30 (IRST)
  - Summer (DST): UTC+4:30 (IRDT)

Deh-e Mirza Ali (Persian: ده ميرزا علي, also Romanized as Deh-e Mīrzā ‘Alī; also known as Mīrzā ‘Alī) is a village in Dust Mohammad Rural District, in the Central District of Hirmand County, Sistan and Baluchestan Province, Iran. At the 2006 census, its population was 104, in 26 families.
