= Deh-e Bar Ahuyi =

Deh-e Bar Ahuyi ده براهویی
- Village
- Country: Iran
- Province: Sistan and Baluchestan
- County: Hirmand
- Bakhsh: Central
- Rural District: Jahanabad

Population (2006)
  - Total: 147
- Time zone: UTC+3:30 (IRST)
  - Summer (DST): UTC+4:30 (IRDT)

Deh-e Bar Ahuyi (Persian: ده براهویی, also Romanized as Deh-e Bar Āhūyī) is a village in Jahanabad Rural District, in the Central District of Hirmand County, Sistan and Baluchestan Province, Iran. At the 2006 census, its population was 147, in 25 families.
