= Abdol Rahman Sarani =

Abdol Rahman Sarani عبدالرحمن ساراني
- Village
- Country: Iran
- Province: Sistan and Baluchestan
- County: Hirmand
- Bakhsh: Central
- Rural District: Margan

Population (2006)
  - Total: 73
- Time zone: UTC+3:30 (IRST)
  - Summer (DST): UTC+4:30 (IRDT)

Abdol Rahman Sarani (Persian: عبدالرحمن ساراني, also Romanized as ʿAbdol Raḩman Sārānī) is a village in Margan Rural District, in the Central District of Hirmand County, Sistan and Baluchestan Province, Iran. At the 2006 census, its population was 73, in 15 families.
