= Arag Khan Malek =

Arag Khan Malek ارگ خان ملك
- Village
- Country: Iran
- Province: Sistan and Baluchestan
- County: Hirmand
- Bakhsh: Central
- Rural District: Margan

Population (2006)
  - Total: 28
- Time zone: UTC+3:30 (IRST)
  - Summer (DST): UTC+4:30 (IRDT)

Arag Khan Malek (Persian: ارگ خان ملك, also Romanized as Ārag Khān Malek) is a village in Margan Rural District, in the Central District of Hirmand County, Sistan and Baluchestan Province, Iran. At the 2006 census, its population was 28, in 5 families.
