= Deh-e Hajji Abdol Rahim Rakhshani =

Deh-e Hajji Abdol Rahim Rakhshani ده حاجي عبدالرحيم رخشاني
- Village
- Country: Iran
- Province: Sistan and Baluchestan
- County: Hirmand
- Bakhsh: Central
- Rural District: Dust Mohammad

Population (2006)
  - Total: 128
- Time zone: UTC+3:30 (IRST)
  - Summer (DST): UTC+4:30 (IRDT)

Deh-e Hajji Abdol Rahim Rakhshani (Persian: ده حاجي عبدالرحيم رخشاني, also Romanized as Deh-e Ḩājjī ʿAbdol Raḩīm Rakhshānī) is a village in Dust Mohammad Rural District, in the Central District of Hirmand County, Sistan and Baluchestan Province, Iran. In the 2006 Iranian census the village was home to 26 families, totaling 128 people.
