= Deh-e Mardeh =

Deh-e Mardeh (Persian: دهمرده) may refer to:

- Deh-e Mardeh, Jahanabad
- Deh-e Mardeh, Margan
- Deh-e Mardeh, Qorqori
