= Mirza Nabi =

Mirza Nabi ميرزانبي
- Village
- Location within Iran
- Coordinates: 31°05′12″N 61°44′03″E
- Country: Iran
- Province: Sistan and Baluchestan
- County: Hirmand
- Bakhsh: Central
- Rural District: Margan

Population (2006)
  - Total: 141
- Time zone: UTC+3:30 (IRST)
  - Summer (DST): UTC+4:30 (IRDT)

Mirza Nabi (Persian: ميرزانبي, also Romanized as Mīrzā Nabī; also known as Deh-e Mīrzā Nabī) is a village in Margan Rural District, in the Central District of Hirmand County, Sistan and Baluchestan Province, Iran. At the 2006 census, its population was 141, in 34 families.
