= Kang-e Emam Dad =

Kang-e Emam Dad كنگ امام داد
- Village
- Location within Iran
- Coordinates: 31°11′51″N 61°39′54″E
- Country: Iran
- Province: Sistan and Baluchestan
- County: Hirmand
- Bakhsh: Central
- Rural District: Margan

Population (2006)
  - Total: 221
- Time zone: UTC+3:30 (IRST)
  - Summer (DST): UTC+4:30 (IRDT)

Kang-e Emam Dad (Persian: كنگ امام داد, also Romanized as Kang-e Emām Dād) is a village in Margan Rural District, in the Central District of Hirmand County, Sistan and Baluchestan Province, Iran. At the 2006 census, its population was 221, in 42 families.
