= Hajji Baluch Khan =

Hajji Baluch Khan حاجي بلوچ خان
- Village
- Location within Iran
- Coordinates: 31°02′27″N 61°48′14″E
- Country: Iran
- Province: Sistan and Baluchestan
- County: Hirmand
- Bakhsh: Central
- Rural District: Jahanabad

Population (2006)
  - Total: 82
- Time zone: UTC+3:30 (IRST)
  - Summer (DST): UTC+4:30 (IRDT)

Hajji Baluch Khan (Persian: حاجي بلوچ خان, also Romanized as Ḩājjī Balūch Khān; also known as Deh-e Ḩājj Balūch Khān and Ḩājj Balūch Khān) is a village in Jahanabad Rural District, in the Central District of Hirmand County, Sistan and Baluchestan Province, Iran. At the 2006 census, its population was 82, in 17 families.
