= Deh-e Kadkhoda Ali-ye Namruri =

Deh-e Kadkhoda Ali-ye Namruri ده كدخداعلي نمروري
- Village
- Location within Iran
- Coordinates: 31°06′44″N 61°38′28″E
- Country: Iran
- Province: Sistan and Baluchestan
- County: Hirmand
- Bakhsh: Central
- Rural District: Margan

Population (2006)
  - Total: 327
- Time zone: UTC+3:30 (IRST)
  - Summer (DST): UTC+4:30 (IRDT)

Deh-e Kadkhoda Ali-ye Namruri (Persian: ده كدخداعلي نمروري, also Romanized as Deh-e Kadkhodā ‘Alī-ye Namrūrī; also known as Deh-e Kadkhodā ‘Alī-ye Namrūdī) is a village in Margan Rural District, in the Central District of Hirmand County, Sistan and Baluchestan Province, Iran. At the 2006 census, its population was 327, in 75 families.
