= Eydu Sohrab =

Eydu Sohrab عيدوسهراب
- Village
- Location within Iran
- Coordinates: 31°07′44″N 61°45′47″E
- Country: Iran
- Province: Sistan and Baluchestan
- County: Hirmand
- Bakhsh: Central
- Rural District: Dust Mohammad

Population (2006)
  - Total: 251
- Time zone: UTC+3:30 (IRST)
  - Summer (DST): UTC+4:30 (IRDT)

Eydu Sohrab (Persian: عيدوسهراب, also Romanized as ‘Eydū Sohrāb; also known as Deh-e Sohrāb) is a village in Dust Mohammad Rural District, in the Central District of Hirmand County, Sistan and Baluchestan Province, Iran. At the 2006 census, its population was 251, in 53 families.
