= Hajji Nabi =

Hajji Nabi حاجي نبي
- Village
- Location within Iran
- Coordinates: 30°48′54″N 61°46′17″E
- Country: Iran
- Province: Sistan and Baluchestan
- County: Hirmand
- Bakhsh: Central
- Rural District: Jahanabad

Population (2006)
  - Total: 22
- Time zone: UTC+3:30 (IRST)
  - Summer (DST): UTC+4:30 (IRDT)

Hajji Nabi (Persian: حاجي نبي, also Romanized as Ḩājjī Nabī; also known as Deh-e Ḩājjī Nabī) is a village in Jahanabad Rural District, in the Central District of Hirmand County, Sistan and Baluchestan Province, Iran. At the 2006 census, its population was 22, in 7 families.
