= Sanjarani =

Village in Sistan and Baluchestan province, Iran

Sanjarani Persian: سنجراني
- Village
- Location within Iran
- Coordinates: 30°59′08″N 61°48′58″E
- Country: Iran
- Province: Sistan and Baluchestan
- County: Hirmand
- District: Central
- Rural District: Jahanabad

Population (2016)
  - Total: 1,914
- Time zone: UTC+3:30 (IRST)

Sanjarani (Persian: سنجراني) (Note: Also romanized as Sanjarānī) is a village in Jahanabad Rural District of the Central District of Hirmand County, (Note: Formerly Miyankongi County) Sistan and Baluchestan province, Iran.

== Demographics ==
=== Population ===
At the time of the 2006 National Census, the village's population was 2,190 in 394 households, when it was in the former Miyankongi District of Zabol County. The following census in 2011 counted 2,071 people in 446 households, by which time the district had been separated from the county in the establishment of Miyankongi County. (Note: Renamed Hirmand County) The rural district was transferred to the new Central District. The 2016 census measured the population of the village as 1,914 people in 459 households. It was the most populous village in its rural district.
