= Hajj Mohammad Alishah =

Hajj Mohammad Alishah حاج محمد عليشاه
- Village
- Location within Iran
- Coordinates: 31°02′29″N 61°48′32″E
- Country: Iran
- Province: Sistan and Baluchestan
- County: Hirmand
- Bakhsh: Central
- Rural District: Jahanabad

Population (2006)
  - Total: 48
- Time zone: UTC+3:30 (IRST)
  - Summer (DST): UTC+4:30 (IRDT)

Hajj Mohammad Alishah (Persian: حاج محمد عليشاه, also Romanized as Ḩājj Moḩammad ‘Alīshāh) is a village in Jahanabad Rural District, in the Central District of Hirmand County, Sistan and Baluchestan Province, Iran. At the 2006 census, its population was 48, in 11 families.
