= Kang-e Shir Ali Khan =

Kang-e Shir Ali Khan كنگ شيرعلي خان
- Village
- Location within Iran
- Coordinates: 31°00′48″N 61°45′32″E
- Country: Iran
- Province: Sistan and Baluchestan
- County: Hirmand
- Bakhsh: Central
- Rural District: Jahanabad

Population (2006)
  - Total: 263
- Time zone: UTC+3:30 (IRST)
  - Summer (DST): UTC+4:30 (IRDT)

Kang-e Shir Ali Khan (Persian: كنگ شيرعلي خان, also Romanized as Kang-e Shīr ‘Alī Khān; also known as Kang-e Shīr ‘Alī) is a village in Jahanabad Rural District, in the Central District of Hirmand County, Sistan and Baluchestan Province, Iran. At the 2006 census, its population was 263, in 53 families.
