= Jangikhu =

Jangikhu جنگيخو
- Village
- Location within Iran
- Coordinates: 30°59′29″N 61°38′11″E
- Country: Iran
- Province: Sistan and Baluchestan
- County: Hirmand
- Bakhsh: Central
- Rural District: Dust Mohammad

Population (2006)
  - Total: 129
- Time zone: UTC+3:30 (IRST)
  - Summer (DST): UTC+4:30 (IRDT)

Jangikhu (Persian: جنگيخو, also Romanized as Jangīkhū; also known as Jangī Khūn and Jangīkhūn) is a village in Dust Mohammad Rural District, in the Central District of Hirmand County, Sistan and Baluchestan Province, Iran. At the 2006 census, its population was 129, in 28 families.
