= Khani Gol Mohammad Rakhshani =

Khani Gol Mohammad Rakhshani خاني گل محمدرخشاني
- Village
- Country: Iran
- Province: Sistan and Baluchestan
- County: Hirmand
- Bakhsh: Central
- Rural District: Dust Mohammad

Population (2006)
  - Total: 121
- Time zone: UTC+3:30 (IRST)
  - Summer (DST): UTC+4:30 (IRDT)

Khani Gol Mohammad Rakhshani (Persian: خاني گل محمدرخشاني, also Romanized as Khānī Gol Moḩammad Rakhshānī) is a village in Dust Mohammad Rural District, in the Central District of Hirmand County, Sistan and Baluchestan Province, Iran. At the 2006 census, its population was 121, in 30 families.
