= Deh-e Ali Akbar =

Deh-e Ali Akbar ده علي اکبر
- Village
- Location within Iran
- Coordinates: 31°00′53″N 61°44′29″E
- Country: Iran
- Province: Sistan and Baluchestan
- County: Hirmand
- Bakhsh: Central
- Rural District: Jahanabad

Population (2006)
  - Total: 44
- Time zone: UTC+3:30 (IRST)
  - Summer (DST): UTC+4:30 (IRDT)

Deh-e Ali Akbar (Persian: ده علي اکبر, also Romanized as Deh-e ‘Alī Akbar) is a village in Jahanabad Rural District, in the Central District of Hirmand County, Sistan and Baluchestan Province, Iran. At the 2006 census, its population was 44, in 8 families.
