= Hajji Hoseyn Shirzehi =

Hajji Hoseyn Shirzehi حاجي حسين شيرزهي
- Village
- Country: Iran
- Province: Sistan and Baluchestan
- County: Hirmand
- Bakhsh: Central
- Rural District: Margan

Population (2006)
  - Total: 35
- Time zone: UTC+3:30 (IRST)
  - Summer (DST): UTC+4:30 (IRDT)

Hajji Hoseyn Shirzehi (Persian: حاجي حسين شيرزهي, also Romanized as Ḩājjī Ḩoseyn Shīrzehī) is a village in Margan Rural District, in the Central District of Hirmand County, Sistan and Baluchestan Province, Iran. At the 2006 census, its population was 35, in 7 families.
