= Deh Hasan =

Deh Hasan or Deh-e Hasan or Dehhasan (Persian: ده حسن) may refer to:

- Deh-e Hasan, Markazi
- Deh-e Hasan, Dust Mohammad, Sistan and Baluchestan Province
- Deh-e Hasan, Jahanabad, Sistan and Baluchestan Province
- Deh Hasan, Tehran
