= Deh-e Molla Abdollah =

Deh-e Molla Abdollah ده ملا عبدالله
- Village
- Location within Iran
- Coordinates: 31°11′24″N 61°44′28″E
- Country: Iran
- Province: Sistan and Baluchestan
- County: Hirmand
- Bakhsh: Central
- Rural District: Dust Mohammad

Population (2006)
  - Total: 40
- Time zone: UTC+3:30 (IRST)
  - Summer (DST): UTC+4:30 (IRDT)

Deh-e Molla Abdollah (Persian: ده ملا عبدالله, also Romanized as Deh-e Mollā ‘Abdollāh; also known as Mollā ‘Abdollāh) is a village in Dust Mohammad Rural District, in the Central District of Hirmand County, Sistan and Baluchestan Province, Iran. At the 2006 census, its population was 40, in 8 families.
