= Deh-e Pahlavan =

Deh-e Pahlavan ده پهلوان
- Village
- Location within Iran
- Coordinates: 31°00′09″N 61°48′38″E
- Country: Iran
- Province: Sistan and Baluchestan
- County: Hirmand
- Bakhsh: Central
- Rural District: Jahanabad

Population (2006)
  - Total: 374
- Time zone: UTC+3:30 (IRST)
  - Summer (DST): UTC+4:30 (IRDT)

Deh-e Pahlavan (Persian: ده پهلوان, also Romanized as Deh-e Pahlavān; also known as Pahlavān) is a village in Jahanabad Rural District, in the Central District of Hirmand County, Sistan and Baluchestan Province, Iran. At the 2006 census, its population was 374 in 79 families.
