= Molla Gol Jan =

Molla Gol Jan ملا گل جان
- Village
- Location within Iran
- Coordinates: 31°10′07″N 61°42′14″E
- Country: Iran
- Province: Sistan and Baluchestan
- County: Hirmand
- Bakhsh: Central
- Rural District: Margan

Population (2006)
  - Total: 198
- Time zone: UTC+3:30 (IRST)
  - Summer (DST): UTC+4:30 (IRDT)

Molla Gol Jan (Persian: ملا گل جان, also Romanized as Mollā Gol Jān and Mollā Goljān; also known as Deh-e Gol Jāl) is a village in Margan Rural District, in the Central District of Hirmand County, Sistan and Baluchestan Province, Iran. At the 2006 census, its population was 198, in 46 families.
