= Margan, Sistan and Baluchestan =

Village in Sistan and Baluchestan province, Iran

Margan Persian: مارگان
- Village
- Location within Iran
- Coordinates: 31°09′14″N 61°42′25″E
- Country: Iran
- Province: Sistan and Baluchestan
- County: Hirmand
- District: Central
- Rural District: Margan

Population (2016)
  - Total: 219
- Time zone: UTC+3:30 (IRST)

Margan (Persian: مارگان) (Note: Also romanized as Mārgān; also known as Marghān, Mārgūn, and Morghān) is a village in, and the capital of, Margan Rural District of the Central District of Hirmand County, (Note: Formerly Miyankongi County) Sistan and Baluchestan province, Iran.

== Demographics ==
=== Population ===
At the time of the 2006 National Census, the village's population was 207 in 45 households, when it was in the former Miyankongi District of Zabol County. The following census in 2011 counted 180 people in 52 households, by which time the district had been separated from the county in the establishment of Miyankongi County. (Note: Renamed Hirmand County) The rural district was transferred to the new Central District. The 2016 census measured the population of the village as 219 people in 72 households.
