= Kang-e Molla Abdollah =

Kang-e Molla Abdollah كنگ ملاعبداله
- Village
- Location within Iran
- Coordinates: 31°11′16″N 61°40′18″E
- Country: Iran
- Province: Sistan and Baluchestan
- County: Hirmand
- Bakhsh: Central
- Rural District: Margan

Population (2006)
  - Total: 177
- Time zone: UTC+3:30 (IRST)
  - Summer (DST): UTC+4:30 (IRDT)

Kang-e Molla Abdollah (Persian: كنگ ملاعبداله, also Romanized as Kang-e Mollā ‘Abdollāh) is a village in Margan Rural District, in the Central District of Hirmand County, Sistan and Baluchestan Province, Iran. At the 2006 census, its population was 177, in 31 families.
