= Jahanabad-e Sofla, Sistan and Baluchestan =

Village in Sistan and Baluchestan province, Iran

Jahanabad-e Sofla Persian: جهان اباد سفلي
- Village
- Location within Iran
- Coordinates: 31°01′56″N 61°46′24″E
- Country: Iran
- Province: Sistan and Baluchestan
- County: Hirmand
- District: Central
- Rural District: Jahanabad

Population (2016)
  - Total: 451
- Time zone: UTC+3:30 (IRST)

Jahanabad-e Sofla (Persian: جهان اباد سفلي) (Note: Also romanized as Jahānābād-e Soflá; also known as Jahānābād-e Pā’īn) is a village in, and the capital of, Jahanabad Rural District of the Central District of Hirmand County, (Note: Formerly Miyankongi County) Sistan and Baluchestan province, Iran.

== Demographics ==
=== Population ===
At the time of the 2006 National Census, the village's population was 362 in 81 households, when it was in the former Miyankongi District of Zabol County. The following census in 2011 counted 511 people in 136 households, by which time the district had been separated from the county in the establishment of Miyankongi County. (Note: Renamed Hirmand County) The rural district was transferred to the new Central District. The 2016 census measured the population of the village as 451 people in 136 households.
