= Dad Shah Mohammad Pahlavan =

Dad Shah Mohammad Pahlavan دادشاه محمد پهلوان
- Village
- Location within Iran
- Coordinates: 31°11′06″N 61°44′48″E
- Country: Iran
- Province: Sistan and Baluchestan
- County: Hirmand
- Bakhsh: Central
- Rural District: Margan

Population (2006)
  - Total: 110
- Time zone: UTC+3:30 (IRST)
  - Summer (DST): UTC+4:30 (IRDT)

Dad Shah Mohammad Pahlavan (Persian: دادشاه محمد پهلوان, also Romanized as Dād Shāh Moḩammad Pahlavān; also known as Dād Shāh and Dādsheh) is a village in Margan Rural District, in the Central District of Hirmand County, Sistan and Baluchestan Province, Iran. At the 2006 census, its population was 110, in 26 families.
