= Tavus =

Tavus طاووس
- Village
- Location within Iran
- Coordinates: 31°04′56″N 61°48′55″E
- Country: Iran
- Province: Sistan and Baluchestan
- County: Hirmand
- Bakhsh: Central
- Rural District: Dust Mohammad

Population (2006)
  - Total: 185
- Time zone: UTC+3:30 (IRST)
  - Summer (DST): UTC+4:30 (IRDT)

Tavus (Persian: طاووس, also Romanized as Ţāvūs; also known as Ţāvūs-e Bāmadī) is a village in Dust Mohammad Rural District, in the Central District of Hirmand County, Sistan and Baluchestan Province, Iran. At the 2006 census, its population was 185, in 34 families.
