= Shahrak-e Gol Beyk =

Shahrak-e Gol Beyk شهرک گل بيک
- Village
- Location within Iran
- Coordinates: 31°05′32″N 61°46′58″E
- Country: Iran
- Province: Sistan and Baluchestan
- County: Hirmand
- Bakhsh: Central
- Rural District: Dust Mohammad

Population (2006)
  - Total: 521
- Time zone: UTC+3:30 (IRST)
  - Summer (DST): UTC+4:30 (IRDT)

Shahrak-e Gol Beyk (Persian: شهرک گل بيک; also known as Shahrak-e Gol Beyg) is a village in Dust Mohammad Rural District, in the Central District of Hirmand County, Sistan and Baluchestan Province, Iran. At the 2006 census, its population was 521, in 106 families.
