= Abil Pol Randeh =

Abil Pol Randeh ابيل پل رنده
- Village
- Country: Iran
- Province: Sistan and Baluchestan
- County: Hirmand
- Bakhsh: Central
- Rural District: Margan

Population (2006)
  - Total: 277
- Time zone: UTC+3:30 (IRST)
  - Summer (DST): UTC+4:30 (IRDT)

Abil Pol Randeh (Persian: ابيل پل رنده, also Romanized as Ābīl Pol Randeh) is a village in Margan Rural District, in the Central District of Hirmand County, Sistan and Baluchestan Province, Iran. At the 2006 census, its population was 277, in 50 families.
