= Lajehi =

Lajehi لجه‌ای
- Village
- Location within Iran
- Coordinates: 30°53′59″N 61°45′49″E
- Country: Iran
- Province: Sistan and Baluchestan
- County: Hirmand
- Bakhsh: Central
- Rural District: Jahanabad

Population (2006)
  - Total: 42
- Time zone: UTC+3:30 (IRST)
  - Summer (DST): UTC+4:30 (IRDT)

Lajehi (Persian: لجه‌ای, also Romanized as Lajeh’ī; also known as Deh-e Lajī and Deh-e Qezelbāsh) is a village in Jahanabad Rural District, in the Central District of Hirmand County, Sistan and Baluchestan Province, Iran. At the 2006 census, its population was 42, in 9 families.
