= Dust Mohammad-e Lashkaran =

Dust Mohammad-e Lashkaran دوست محمدلشكران
- Village
- Location within Iran
- Coordinates: 31°08′36″N 61°44′34″E
- Country: Iran
- Province: Sistan and Baluchestan
- County: Hirmand
- Bakhsh: Central
- Rural District: Dust Mohammad

Population (2006)
  - Total: 262
- Time zone: UTC+3:30 (IRST)
  - Summer (DST): UTC+4:30 (IRDT)

Dust Mohammad-e Lashkaran (Persian: دوست محمدلشكران, also Romanized as Dūst Moḩammad-e Lashkarān; also known as Dūst Moḩammad-e Lashgarān) is a village in Dust Mohammad Rural District, in the Central District of Hirmand County, Sistan and Baluchestan Province, Iran. At the 2006 census, its population was 262, in 53 families.
