= Hajji Malang Kharut =

Hajji Malang Kharut حاجي ملنگ خروط
- Village
- Country: Iran
- Province: Sistan and Baluchestan
- County: Hirmand
- Bakhsh: Central
- Rural District: Jahanabad

Population (2006)
  - Total: 535
- Time zone: UTC+3:30 (IRST)
  - Summer (DST): UTC+4:30 (IRDT)

Hajji Malang Kharut (Persian: حاجي ملنگ خروط, also Romanized as Ḩājjī Malang Kharūţ) is a village in Jahanabad Rural District, in the Central District of Hirmand County, Sistan and Baluchestan Province, Iran. At the 2006 census, its population was 535, in 103 families.
