= Deh-e Afghan-e Bar Ahuyi =

Deh-e Afghan-e Bar Ahuyi ده افغان براهویی
- Village
- Location within Iran
- Coordinates: 31°05′24″N 61°39′26″E
- Country: Iran
- Province: Sistan and Baluchestan
- County: Hirmand
- Bakhsh: Central
- Rural District: Margan

Population (2006)
  - Total: 161
- Time zone: UTC+3:30 (IRST)
  - Summer (DST): UTC+4:30 (IRDT)

Deh-e Afghan-e Bar Ahuyi (Persian: ده افغان براهویی, also Romanized as Deh-e Afghan-e Bar Āhūyī; also known as Deh-e Afghān-e Barāvī) is a village in Margan Rural District, in the Central District of Hirmand County, Sistan and Baluchestan Province, Iran. At the 2006 census, its population was 161 people with 35 families.
