= Deh-e Rasul Khan Mohammad =

Deh-e Rasul Khan Mohammad ده رسول خان محمد
- Village
- Location within Iran
- Coordinates: 31°08′41″N 61°46′43″E
- Country: Iran
- Province: Sistan and Baluchestan
- County: Hirmand
- Bakhsh: Central
- Rural District: Dust Mohammad

Population (2006)
  - Total: 75
- Time zone: UTC+3:30 (IRST)
  - Summer (DST): UTC+4:30 (IRDT)

Deh-e Rasul Khan Mohammad (Persian: ده رسول خان محمد, also Romanized as Deh-e Rasūl Khān Moḩammad) is a village in Dust Mohammad Rural District, in the Central District of Hirmand County, Sistan and Baluchestan Province, Iran. At the 2006 census, its population was 75, in 14 families.
