= Deh-e Salim =

Deh-e Salim ده سليم
- Village
- Location within Iran
- Coordinates: 31°07′31″N 61°32′12″E
- Country: Iran
- Province: Sistan and Baluchestan
- County: Hirmand
- Bakhsh: Central
- Rural District: Dust Mohammad

Population (2006)
  - Total: 198
- Time zone: UTC+3:30 (IRST)
  - Summer (DST): UTC+4:30 (IRDT)

Deh-e Salim (Persian: ده سليم, also Romanized as Deh-e Salīm) is a village in Dust Mohammad Rural District, in the Central District of Hirmand County, Sistan and Baluchestan Province, Iran. At the 2006 census, its population was 198, in 30 families.
