= Golshah =

Golshah گلشاه
- Village
- Location within Iran
- Coordinates: 31°11′23″N 61°47′16″E
- Country: Iran
- Province: Sistan and Baluchestan
- County: Hirmand
- Bakhsh: Central
- Rural District: Dust Mohammad

Population (2006)
  - Total: 109
- Time zone: UTC+3:30 (IRST)
  - Summer (DST): UTC+4:30 (IRDT)

Golshah (Persian: گلشاه, also Romanized as Golshāh) is a village in Dust Mohammad Rural District, in the Central District of Hirmand County, Sistan and Baluchestan Province, Iran. At the 2006 census, its population was 109, in 26 families.
