= Aziz-e Bamadi =

Aziz-e Bamadi عزيزبامدي
- Village
- Location within Iran
- Coordinates: 31°03′07″N 61°45′41″E
- Country: Iran
- Province: Sistan and Baluchestan
- County: Hirmand
- Bakhsh: Central
- Rural District: Jahanabad

Population (2006)
  - Total: 250
- Time zone: UTC+3:30 (IRST)
  - Summer (DST): UTC+4:30 (IRDT)

Aziz-e Bamadi (Persian: عزيزبامدي, also Romanized as ‘Azīz-e Bāmadī; also known as Shahrak-e ‘Azīz-e Bāmadī) is a village in Jahanabad Rural District, in the Central District of Hirmand County, Sistan and Baluchestan Province, Iran. At the 2006 census, its population was 250, in 52 families.
