= Abbas Shah Gol =

Abbas Shah Gol عباس شاهگل
- Village
- Location within Iran
- Coordinates: 31°11′50″N 61°32′00″E
- Country: Iran
- Province: Sistan and Baluchestan
- County: Hirmand
- Bakhsh: Central
- Rural District: Dust Mohammad

Population (2006)
  - Total: 39
- Time zone: UTC+3:30 (IRST)
  - Summer (DST): UTC+4:30 (IRDT)

Abbas Shah Gol (Persian: عباس شاهگل, also Romanized as ʿAbbās Shāh Gol) is a village in Dust Mohammad Rural District, in the Central District of Hirmand County, Sistan and Baluchestan Province, Iran. At the 2006 census, its population was 39, in 7 families.
