= Gholam Mohammad Sarani =

Gholam Mohammad Sarani غلام محمد ساراني
- Village
- Country: Iran
- Province: Sistan and Baluchestan
- County: Hirmand
- Bakhsh: Central
- Rural District: Dust Mohammad

Population (2006)
  - Total: 116
- Time zone: UTC+3:30 (IRST)
  - Summer (DST): UTC+4:30 (IRDT)

Gholam Mohammad Sarani (Persian: غلام محمد ساراني, also Romanized as Gholām Moḩammad Sārānī) is a village in Dust Mohammad Rural District, in the Central District of Hirmand County, Sistan and Baluchestan Province, Iran. At the 2006 census, its population was 116, in 24 families.
