= Yar Mohammad-e Alam =

Yar Mohammad-e Alam يارمحمدعلم
- Village
- Location within Iran
- Coordinates: 31°04′20″N 61°46′43″E
- Country: Iran
- Province: Sistan and Baluchestan
- County: Hirmand
- Bakhsh: Central
- Rural District: Dust Mohammad

Population (2006)
  - Total: 463
- Time zone: UTC+3:30 (IRST)
  - Summer (DST): UTC+4:30 (IRDT)

Yar Mohammad-e Alam (Persian: يارمحمدعلم, also Romanized as Yār Moḩammad-e ‘Alam; also known as Yār Moḩammad) is a village in Dust Mohammad Rural District, in the Central District of Hirmand County, Sistan and Baluchestan Province, Iran. At the 2006 census, its population was 463, in 109 families.
