= Deh-e Rakhshani =

Deh-e Rakhshani ده رخشاني
- Village
- Location within Iran
- Coordinates: 31°04′03″N 61°44′04″E
- Country: Iran
- Province: Sistan and Baluchestan
- County: Hirmand
- Bakhsh: Central
- Rural District: Dust Mohammad

Population (2006)
  - Total: 122
- Time zone: UTC+3:30 (IRST)
  - Summer (DST): UTC+4:30 (IRDT)

Deh-e Rakhshani (Persian: ده رخشاني, also Romanized as Deh-e Rakhshānī; also known as Deh-e Rakhshā’ī) is a village in Dust Mohammad Rural District, in the Central District of Hirmand County, Sistan and Baluchestan Province, Iran. At the 2006 census, its population was 122, in 21 families.
