= Gholam Mohammad, Iran =

Gholam Mohammad غلام محمد
- Village
- Location within Iran
- Coordinates: 31°06′33″N 61°47′38″E
- Country: Iran
- Province: Sistan and Baluchestan
- County: Hirmand
- Bakhsh: Central
- Rural District: Dust Mohammad

Population (2006)
  - Total: 64
- Time zone: UTC+3:30 (IRST)
  - Summer (DST): UTC+4:30 (IRDT)

Gholam Mohammad (Persian: غلام محمد, also Romanized as Gholām Moḩammad; also known as Gholam Mohammad Pūdīneh and Khāneh-ye Gholām Moḩammad) is a village in Dust Mohammad Rural District, in the Central District of Hirmand County, Sistan and Baluchestan Province, Iran. At the 2006 census, its population was 64, in 17 families.
