= Qajar Mohammad Hasan =

Qajar Mohammad Hasan قجر محمد حسن
- Village
- Country: Iran
- Province: Sistan and Baluchestan
- County: Hirmand
- Bakhsh: Central
- Rural District: Dust Mohammad

Population (2006)
  - Total: 428
- Time zone: UTC+3:30 (IRST)
  - Summer (DST): UTC+4:30 (IRDT)

Qajar Mohammad Hasan (Persian: قجر محمد حسن, also Romanized as Qajar Moḩammad Ḩasan) is a village in Dust Mohammad Rural District, in the Central District of Hirmand County, Sistan and Baluchestan Province, Iran. At the 2006 census, its population was 428, in 84 families.
