= Deh-e Amir =

Deh-e Amir ده امير
- Village
- Location within Iran
- Coordinates: 31°10′54″N 61°46′42″E
- Country: Iran
- Province: Sistan and Baluchestan
- County: Hirmand
- Bakhsh: Central
- Rural District: Dust Mohammad

Population (2006)
  - Total: 50
- Time zone: UTC+3:30 (IRST)
  - Summer (DST): UTC+4:30 (IRDT)

Deh-e Amir (Persian: ده امير, also Romanized as Deh-e Amīr; also known as Deh-e Amīr Khān) is a village in Dust Mohammad Rural District, in the Central District of Hirmand County, Sistan and Baluchestan Province, Iran. At the 2006 census, its population was 50, in 9 families.
