= Kadkhoda Hoseyn =

Kadkhoda Hoseyn كدخداحسين
- Village
- Country: Iran
- Province: Sistan and Baluchestan
- County: Hirmand
- Bakhsh: Central
- Rural District: Jahanabad

Population (2006)
  - Total: 63
- Time zone: UTC+3:30 (IRST)
  - Summer (DST): UTC+4:30 (IRDT)

Kadkhoda Hoseyn (Persian: كدخداحسين, also Romanized as Kadkhodā Ḩoseyn) is a village in Jahanabad Rural District, in the Central District of Hirmand County, Sistan and Baluchestan Province, Iran. At the 2006 census, its population was 63, in 15 families.
