= Balal, Iran =

Balal بلال
- Village
- Location within Iran
- Coordinates: 31°00′13″N 61°47′13″E
- Country: Iran
- Province: Sistan and Baluchestan
- County: Hirmand
- Bakhsh: Central
- Rural District: Jahanabad

Population (2006)
  - Total: 50
- Time zone: UTC+3:30 (IRST)
  - Summer (DST): UTC+4:30 (IRDT)

Balal (Persian: بلال, also Romanized as Balāl; also known as Deh-e Balāl) is a village in Jahanabad Rural District, in the Central District of Hirmand County, Sistan and Baluchestan Province, Iran. At the 2006 census, its population was 50, in 11 families.
