= Hajji Malek Shirzayi =

Hajji Malek Shirzayi حاجي ملك شيرزايي
- Village
- Country: Iran
- Province: Sistan and Baluchestan
- County: Hirmand
- Bakhsh: Central
- Rural District: Margan

Population (2006)
  - Total: 95
- Time zone: UTC+3:30 (IRST)
  - Summer (DST): UTC+4:30 (IRDT)

Hajji Malek Shirzayi (Persian: حاجي ملك شيرزايي, also Romanized as Ḩājjī Malek Shīrzāyī) is a village in Margan Rural District, in the Central District of Hirmand County, Sistan and Baluchestan Province, Iran. At the 2006 census, its population was 95, in 17 families.
