= Shir Mohammad Gargij =

Shir Mohammad Gargij شيرمحمدگرگيج
- Village
- Country: Iran
- Province: Sistan and Baluchestan
- County: Hirmand
- Bakhsh: Central
- Rural District: Jahanabad

Population (2006)
  - Total: 45
- Time zone: UTC+3:30 (IRST)
  - Summer (DST): UTC+4:30 (IRDT)

Shir Mohammad Gargij (Persian: شيرمحمدگرگيج, also Romanized as Shīr Moḩammad Gargīj) is a village in Jahanabad Rural District, in the Central District of Hirmand County, Sistan and Baluchestan Province, Iran. At the 2006 census, its population was 45, in 8 families.
