= Yar Mohammad-e Kharut =

Yar Mohammad-e Kharut يارمحمدخروط
- Village
- Location within Iran
- Coordinates: 31°11′54″N 61°45′35″E
- Country: Iran
- Province: Sistan and Baluchestan
- County: Hirmand
- Bakhsh: Central
- Rural District: Dust Mohammad

Population (2006)
  - Total: 91
- Time zone: UTC+3:30 (IRST)
  - Summer (DST): UTC+4:30 (IRDT)

Yar Mohammad-e Kharut (Persian: يارمحمدخروط, also Romanized as Yār Moḩammad-e Kharūţ; also known as Yār Moḩammad-e Kūhī) is a village in Dust Mohammad Rural District, in the Central District of Hirmand County, Sistan and Baluchestan Province, Iran. At the 2006 census, its population was 91, in 19 families.
