= Deh-e Nazar Gargich =

Deh-e Nazar Gargich ده نظر گرگيچ
- Village
- Location within Iran
- Coordinates: 31°04′36″N 61°39′51″E
- Country: Iran
- Province: Sistan and Baluchestan
- County: Hirmand
- Bakhsh: Central
- Rural District: Jahanabad

Population (2006)
  - Total: 284
- Time zone: UTC+3:30 (IRST)
  - Summer (DST): UTC+4:30 (IRDT)

Deh-e Nazar Gargich (Persian: ده نظر گرگيچ, also Romanized as Deh-e Naz̧ar Gargīch; also known as Deh-e Naz̧ar Gargīj and Naz̧ar Gargīch) is a village in Jahanabad Rural District, in the Central District of Hirmand County, Sistan and Baluchestan Province, Iran. At the 2006 census, its population was 284, in 52 families.
