= Deh-e Said =

Deh-e Said ده سعيد
- Village
- Location within Iran
- Coordinates: 31°08′56″N 61°38′16″E
- Country: Iran
- Province: Sistan and Baluchestan
- County: Hirmand
- Bakhsh: Central
- Rural District: Margan

Population (2006)
  - Total: 225
- Time zone: UTC+3:30 (IRST)
  - Summer (DST): UTC+4:30 (IRDT)

Deh-e Said (Persian: ده سعيد, also Romanized as Deh-e Sa‘īd) is a village in Margan Rural District, in the Central District of Hirmand County, Sistan and Baluchestan Province, Iran. At the 2006 census, its population was 225, in 50 families.
