= Deh-e Hoseyn Ali Khan =

Deh-e Hoseyn Ali Khan ده حسين علي خان
- Village
- Location within Iran
- Coordinates: 31°06′07″N 61°44′53″E
- Country: Iran
- Province: Sistan and Baluchestan
- County: Hirmand
- Bakhsh: Central
- Rural District: Dust Mohammad

Population (2006)
  - Total: 453
- Time zone: UTC+3:30 (IRST)
  - Summer (DST): UTC+4:30 (IRDT)

Deh-e Hoseyn Ali Khan (Persian: ده حسين علي خان, also Romanized as Deh-e Ḩoseyn ʿAlī Khān and Deh-e Ḩoseyn‘alī Khān; also known as Ḩoseyn-e ‘Alī Khān) is a village in Dust Mohammad Rural District, in the Central District of Hirmand County, Sistan and Baluchestan Province, Iran. At the 2006 census, its population was 453, in 89 families.
