= Qaljehi =

Qaljehi قلجه اي
- Village
- Location within Iran
- Coordinates: 31°08′42″N 61°40′19″E
- Country: Iran
- Province: Sistan and Baluchestan
- County: Hirmand
- Bakhsh: Central
- Rural District: Margan

Population (2006)
  - Total: 95
- Time zone: UTC+3:30 (IRST)
  - Summer (DST): UTC+4:30 (IRDT)

Qaljehi (Persian: قلجه اي, also Romanized as Qaljeh’ī) is a village in Margan Rural District, in the Central District of Hirmand County, Sistan and Baluchestan Province, Iran. At the 2006 census, its population was 95, in 22 families.
