= Jahan Tigh, Hirmand =

Village in Sistan and Baluchestan province, Iran

Jahan Tigh Persian: جهانتيغ
- Village
- Location within Iran
- Coordinates: 31°04′58″N 61°40′36″E
- Country: Iran
- Province: Sistan and Baluchestan
- County: Hirmand
- District: Central
- Rural District: Margan

Population (2016)
  - Total: 798
- Time zone: UTC+3:30 (IRST)

Jahan Tigh (Persian: جهانتيغ) (Note: Also romanized as Jahān Tīgh and Jahāntīgh) is a village in Margan Rural District of the Central District of Hirmand County, (Note: Formerly Miyankongi County) Sistan and Baluchestan province, Iran.

== Demographics ==
=== Population ===
At the time of the 2006 National Census, the village's population was 826 in 172 households, when it was in the former Miyankongi District of Zabol County. The following census in 2011 counted 634 people in 144 households, by which time the district had been separated from the county in the establishment of Miyankongi County. (Note: Renamed Hirmand County) The rural district was transferred to the new Central District. The 2016 census measured the population of the village as 798 people in 175 households. It was the most populous village in its rural district.
