= Deh-e Mirza Khan-e Bar Ahuyi =

Deh-e Mirza Khan-e Bar Ahuyi ده میرزاخان براهویی
- Village
- Location within Iran
- Coordinates: 31°04′58″N 61°39′42″E
- Country: Iran
- Province: Sistan and Baluchestan
- County: Hirmand
- Bakhsh: Central
- Rural District: Margan

Population (2006)
  - Total: 109
- Time zone: UTC+3:30 (IRST)
  - Summer (DST): UTC+4:30 (IRDT)

Deh-e Mirza Khan-e Bar Ahuyi (Persian: ده میرزاخان براهویی, also Romanized as Deh-e Mīrzā Khān-e Bar Āhūyī; also known as Deh-e Mīrzā Khān-e Barāvī) is a village in Margan Rural District, in the Central District of Hirmand County, Sistan and Baluchestan Province, Iran. At the 2006 census, its population was 109, in 22 families.
