= Hajji Malek, Sistan and Baluchestan =

Hajji Malek حاجي ملک
- Village
- Location within Iran
- Coordinates: 31°01′22″N 61°46′52″E
- Country: Iran
- Province: Sistan and Baluchestan
- County: Hirmand
- Bakhsh: Central
- Rural District: Jahanabad

Population (2006)
  - Total: 294
- Time zone: UTC+3:30 (IRST)
  - Summer (DST): UTC+4:30 (IRDT)

Hajji Malek (Persian: حاجي ملک, also Romanized as Ḩājjī Malek; also known as Malek Moḩammad) is a village in Jahanabad Rural District, in the Central District of Hirmand County, Sistan and Baluchestan Province, Iran. At the 2006 census, its population was 294, in 56 families.
