= Deh-e Gholam Mohammad Sarani =

Deh-e Gholam Mohammad Sarani ده غلام محمد ساراني
- Village
- Country: Iran
- Province: Sistan and Baluchestan
- County: Hirmand
- Bakhsh: Central
- Rural District: Dust Mohammad

Population (2006)
  - Total: 36
- Time zone: UTC+3:30 (IRST)
  - Summer (DST): UTC+4:30 (IRDT)

Deh-e Gholam Mohammad Sarani (Persian: ده غلام محمد ساراني, also Romanized as Deh-e Gholām Moḩammad Sārānī) is a village in Dust Mohammad Rural District, in the Central District of Hirmand County, Sistan and Baluchestan Province, Iran. At the 2006 census, its population was 36, in 6 families.
