= Dad Zari =

Dad Zari دادزري
- Village
- Location within Iran
- Coordinates: 31°05′05″N 61°47′56″E
- Country: Iran
- Province: Sistan and Baluchestan
- County: Hirmand
- Bakhsh: Central
- Rural District: Dust Mohammad

Population (2006)
  - Total: 122
- Time zone: UTC+3:30 (IRST)
  - Summer (DST): UTC+4:30 (IRDT)

Dad Zari (Persian: دادزري, also Romanized as Dād Zarī; also known as Dāz Darī) is a village in Dust Mohammad Rural District, in the Central District of Hirmand County, Sistan and Baluchestan Province, Iran. At the 2006 census, its population was 122, in 20 families.
