= Deh-e Hajji Hoseyn, Hirmand =

Deh-e Hajji Hoseyn ده حاجي حسين
- Village
- Location within Iran
- Coordinates: 30°59′28″N 61°47′12″E
- Country: Iran
- Province: Sistan and Baluchestan
- County: Hirmand
- Bakhsh: Central
- Rural District: Jahanabad

Population (2006)
  - Total: 90
- Time zone: UTC+3:30 (IRST)
  - Summer (DST): UTC+4:30 (IRDT)

Deh-e Hajji Hoseyn (Persian: ده حاجي حسين, also Romanized as Deh-e Ḩājjī Ḩoseyn) is a village in Jahanabad Rural District, in the Central District of Hirmand County, Sistan and Baluchestan Province, Iran. At the 2006 census, its population was 90, in 22 families.
