= Pudineh =

Pudineh پودينه
- Village
- Location within Iran
- Coordinates: 31°07′50″N 61°46′15″E
- Country: Iran
- Province: Sistan and Baluchestan
- County: Hirmand
- Bakhsh: Central
- Rural District: Dust Mohammad

Population (2006)
  - Total: 415
- Time zone: UTC+3:30 (IRST)
  - Summer (DST): UTC+4:30 (IRDT)

Pudineh (Persian: پودينه, also Romanized as Pūdīneh) is a village in Dust Mohammad Rural District, in the Central District of Hirmand County, Sistan and Baluchestan Province, Iran. At the 2006 census, its population was 415, in 85 families.
