= Qajar Barani =

Qajar Barani قجرباراني
- Village
- Location within Iran
- Coordinates: 31°01′04″N 61°46′30″E
- Country: Iran
- Province: Sistan and Baluchestan
- County: Hirmand
- Bakhsh: Central
- Rural District: Jahanabad

Population (2006)
  - Total: 82
- Time zone: UTC+3:30 (IRST)
  - Summer (DST): UTC+4:30 (IRDT)

Qajar Barani (Persian: قجرباراني, also Romanized as Qajar Bārānī; also known as Gholāmḩoseyn-e Bārānī) is a village in Jahanabad Rural District, in the Central District of Hirmand County, Sistan and Baluchestan Province, Iran. At the 2006 census, its population was 82, in 22 families.
