= Esmail Ali =

Esmail Ali اسماعيل علی
- Village
- Country: Iran
- Province: Sistan and Baluchestan
- County: Hirmand
- Bakhsh: Central
- Rural District: Margan

Population (2006)
  - Total: 142
- Time zone: UTC+3:30 (IRST)
  - Summer (DST): UTC+4:30 (IRDT)

Esmail Ali (Persian: اسماعيل علی, also Romanized as Esmāʿīl ʿAlī) is a village in Margan Rural District, in the Central District of Hirmand County, Sistan and Baluchestan Province, Iran. At the 2006 census, its population was 142, in 29 families.
