= Deh-e Karam =

Deh-e Karam or Dehkaram (Persian: ده كرم) may refer to:

- Dehkaram, Isfahan
- Deh-e Karam, Sistan and Baluchestan
- Deh-e Karam Mazraeh, Sistan and Baluchestan Province
