= Yusef-e Eslam =

Yusef-e Eslam يوسف اسلام
- Village
- Location within Iran
- Coordinates: 31°08′55″N 61°44′55″E
- Country: Iran
- Province: Sistan and Baluchestan
- County: Hirmand
- Bakhsh: Central
- Rural District: Dust Mohammad

Population (2006)
  - Total: 115
- Time zone: UTC+3:30 (IRST)
  - Summer (DST): UTC+4:30 (IRDT)

Yusef-e Eslam (Persian: يوسف اسلام, also Romanized as Yūsef-e Eslām; also known as Yūsef Salām and Yūsof Salām) is a village in Dust Mohammad Rural District, in the Central District of Hirmand County, Sistan and Baluchestan Province, Iran. At the 2006 census, its population was 115, in 25 families.
