= Hoseyn Arbabi =

Hoseyn Arbabi حسين اربابي
- Village
- Location within Iran
- Coordinates: 31°02′10″N 61°49′06″E
- Country: Iran
- Province: Sistan and Baluchestan
- County: Hirmand
- Bakhsh: Central
- Rural District: Jahanabad

Population (2006)
  - Total: 125
- Time zone: UTC+3:30 (IRST)
  - Summer (DST): UTC+4:30 (IRDT)

Hoseyn Arbabi (Persian: حسين اربابي, also romanized as Ḩoseyn Arbābī; also known as Deh-e Ḩoseyn Arbābī) is a village in Jahanabad Rural District, in the Central District of Hirmand County, Sistan and Baluchestan Province, Iran. At the 2006 census, its population was 125, in 28 families.
