= Pakir Shahsavar =

Pakir Shahsavar پكيرشهسوار
- Village
- Location within Iran
- Coordinates: 31°09′12″N 61°46′21″E
- Country: Iran
- Province: Sistan and Baluchestan
- County: Hirmand
- Bakhsh: Central
- Rural District: Dust Mohammad

Population (2006)
  - Total: 262
- Time zone: UTC+3:30 (IRST)
  - Summer (DST): UTC+4:30 (IRDT)

Pakir Shahsavar (Persian: پكيرشهسوار, also Romanized as Pakīr Shahsavār; also known as Peykeh-ye Shahsavār) is a village in Dust Mohammad Rural District, in the Central District of Hirmand County, Sistan and Baluchestan Province, Iran. At the 2006 census, its population was 262, in 45 families.
