= Deh-e Nik Mohammad =

Deh-e Nik Mohammad ده نيک محمد
- Village
- Location within Iran
- Coordinates: 31°04′31″N 61°47′24″E
- Country: Iran
- Province: Sistan and Baluchestan
- County: Hirmand
- Bakhsh: Central
- Rural District: Dust Mohammad

Population (2006)
  - Total: 162
- Time zone: UTC+3:30 (IRST)
  - Summer (DST): UTC+4:30 (IRDT)

Deh-e Nik Mohammad (Persian: ده نيک محمد, also Romanized as Deh-e Nīk Moḩammad; also known as Nīk Moḩammad) is a village in Dust Mohammad Rural District, in the Central District of Hirmand County, Sistan and Baluchestan Province, Iran. At the 2006 census, its population was 162, in 30 families.
