= Rustai-ye Isa Zehi =

Rustai-ye Isa Zehi روستاي عيسي زهي
- Village
- Location within Iran
- Coordinates: 31°06′03″N 61°46′10″E
- Country: Iran
- Province: Sistan and Baluchestan
- County: Hirmand
- Bakhsh: Central
- Rural District: Margan

Population (2006)
  - Total: 219
- Time zone: UTC+3:30 (IRST)
  - Summer (DST): UTC+4:30 (IRDT)

Rustai-ye Isa Zehi (Persian: روستاي عيسي زهي, also Romanized as Rūstāī-ye ‘Īsá Zehī; also known as ‘Īsá Zahī) is a village in Margan Rural District, in the Central District of Hirmand County, Sistan and Baluchestan Province, Iran. At the 2006 census, its population was 219, in 42 families.
