= Deh-e Hajji Abbas Khan =

Deh-e Hajji Abbas Khan ده حاجي عباس خان
- Village
- Location within Iran
- Coordinates: 31°04′08″N 61°46′04″E
- Country: Iran
- Province: Sistan and Baluchestan
- County: Hirmand
- Bakhsh: Central
- Rural District: Dust Mohammad

Population (2006)
  - Total: 439
- Time zone: UTC+3:30 (IRST)
  - Summer (DST): UTC+4:30 (IRDT)

Deh-e Hajji Abbas Khan (Persian: ده حاجي عباس خان, also Romanized as Deh-e Ḩājjī ‘Abbās Khān; also known as Deh-e Ḩājj ‘Abbās Khān) is a village in Dust Mohammad Rural District, in the Central District of Hirmand County, Sistan and Baluchestan Province, Iran. At the 2006 census, its population was 439, in 85 families.
