= Golshah Naruyi =

Golshah Naruyi گلشاه نارويي
- Village
- Country: Iran
- Province: Sistan and Baluchestan
- County: Hirmand
- Bakhsh: Central
- Rural District: Dust Mohammad

Population (2006)
  - Total: 61
- Time zone: UTC+3:30 (IRST)
  - Summer (DST): UTC+4:30 (IRDT)

Golshah Naruyi (Persian: گلشاه نارويي, also Romanized as Golshāh Nārūyī; also known as Karīm Nārūyī) is a village in Dust Mohammad Rural District, in the Central District of Hirmand County, Sistan and Baluchestan Province, Iran. At the 2006 census, its population was 61, in 9 families.
