= Deh-e Mohammad Shahraki =

Deh-e Mohammad Shahraki ده محمد شهرکي
- Village
- Location within Iran
- Coordinates: 31°01′39″N 61°48′01″E
- Country: Iran
- Province: Sistan and Baluchestan
- County: Hirmand
- Bakhsh: Central
- Rural District: Jahanabad

Population (2006)
  - Total: 202
- Time zone: UTC+3:30 (IRST)
  - Summer (DST): UTC+4:30 (IRDT)

Deh-e Mohammad Shahraki (Persian: ده محمد شهرکي, also romanized as Deh-e Moḩammad Shahrakī; also known as Moḩammad Shahrakī) is a village in Jahanabad Rural District, in the Central District of Hirmand County, Sistan and Baluchestan Province, Iran. According to the 2006 census, its population was 202, in 46 families.
