= Deh-e Khoda Rahm =

Deh-e Khoda Rahm ده خدارحم
- Village
- Location within Iran
- Coordinates: 31°04′47″N 61°42′11″E
- Country: Iran
- Province: Sistan and Baluchestan
- County: Hirmand
- Bakhsh: Central
- Rural District: Margan

Population (2006)
  - Total: 26
- Time zone: UTC+3:30 (IRST)
  - Summer (DST): UTC+4:30 (IRDT)

Deh-e Khoda Rahm (Persian: ده خدارحم, also Romanized as Deh-e Khodā Raḩm; also known as Deh-e Khodā Raḩīm) is a village in Margan Rural District, in the Central District of Hirmand County, Sistan and Baluchestan Province, Iran. At the 2006 census, its population was 26, in 5 families.
