= Randeh Shahraki =

Randeh Shahraki رنده شهركي
- Village
- Location within Iran
- Coordinates: 31°08′19″N 61°37′43″E
- Country: Iran
- Province: Sistan and Baluchestan
- County: Hirmand
- Bakhsh: Central
- Rural District: Margan

Population (2006)
  - Total: 478
- Time zone: UTC+3:30 (IRST)
  - Summer (DST): UTC+4:30 (IRDT)

Randeh Shahraki (Persian: رنده شهركي, also Romanized as Randeh Shahrakī; also known as Randeh and Randeh-ye Soflá) is a village in Margan Rural District, in the Central District of Hirmand County, Sistan and Baluchestan Province, Iran. At the 2006 census, its population was 478, in 93 families.
