= Deh-e Khamr =

Village in Sistan and Baluchestan province, Iran

Deh-e Khamr Persian: ده خمر
- Village
- Location within Iran
- Coordinates: 31°10′28″N 61°46′19″E
- Country: Iran
- Province: Sistan and Baluchestan
- County: Hirmand
- District: Central
- Rural District: Dust Mohammad

Population (2016)
  - Total: 1,119
- Time zone: UTC+3:30 (IRST)

Deh-e Khamr (Persian: ده خمر) (Note: Also romanized as Deh Khamr; also known as Khammar and Khamr) is a village in Dust Mohammad Rural District of the Central District of Hirmand County, (Note: Formerly Miyankongi County) Sistan and Baluchestan province, Iran.

== Demographics ==
=== Population ===
At the time of the 2006 National Census, the village's population was 1,030 in 207 households, when it was in the former Miyankongi District of Zabol County. The following census in 2011 counted 1,261 people in 275 households, by which time the district had been separated from the county in the establishment of Miyankongi County. (Note: Renamed Hirmand County) The rural district was transferred to the new Central District. The 2016 census measured the population of the village as 1,119 people in 260 households. It was the most populous village in its rural district.
