= Deh-e Hasan, Jahanabad =

Deh-e Hasan ده حسن
- Village
- Location within Iran
- Coordinates: 31°06′11″N 61°46′07″E
- Country: Iran
- Province: Sistan and Baluchestan
- County: Hirmand
- Bakhsh: Central
- Rural District: Jahanabad

Population (2006)
  - Total: 36
- Time zone: UTC+3:30 (IRST)
  - Summer (DST): UTC+4:30 (IRDT)

Deh-e Hasan (Persian: ده حسن, also Romanized as Deh-e Ḩasan; also known as Ḩasanābād) is a village in Jahanabad Rural District, in the Central District of Hirmand County, Sistan and Baluchestan Province, Iran. At the 2006 census, its population was 36, in 11 families.
