= Deh Now-e Ali Khan =

Deh Now-e Ali Khan دهنوعلي خان
- Village
- Location within Iran
- Coordinates: 30°59′13″N 61°47′29″E
- Country: Iran
- Province: Sistan and Baluchestan
- County: Hirmand
- Bakhsh: Central
- Rural District: Jahanabad

Population (2006)
  - Total: 940
- Time zone: UTC+3:30 (IRST)
  - Summer (DST): UTC+4:30 (IRDT)

Deh Now-e Ali Khan (Persian: دهنوعلي خان, also Romanized as Deh Now-e ‘Alī Khān and Dehnow ‘Ali Khan; also known as Ali Khan and Deh Now-e Malek) is a village in Jahanabad Rural District, in the Central District of Hirmand County, Sistan and Baluchestan Province, Iran. At the 2006 census, its population was 940, in 179 families.
