= Siadak =

Siadak or Siyadak (Persian: سيادك) may refer to:

- Siadak, Hirmand
- Siadak Deh Mardeh, Hirmand County
- Siadak, Sib and Suran
