= Deh-e Mardeh, Jahanabad =

Deh-e Mardeh دهمرده
- Village
- Location within Iran
- Coordinates: 31°03′18″N 61°44′39″E
- Country: Iran
- Province: Sistan and Baluchestan
- County: Hirmand
- Bakhsh: Central
- Rural District: Jahanabad

Population (2006)
  - Total: 74
- Time zone: UTC+3:30 (IRST)
  - Summer (DST): UTC+4:30 (IRDT)

Deh-e Mardeh (Persian: دهمرده) is a village in Jahanabad Rural District, in the Central District of Hirmand County, Sistan and Baluchestan Province, Iran. At the 2006 census, its population was 74, in 12 families.
