= Ali Khan-e Kachkul =

Ali Khan-e Kachkul عليخان کچکول
- Village
- Location within Iran
- Coordinates: 31°08′59″N 61°45′22″E
- Country: Iran
- Province: Sistan and Baluchestan
- County: Hirmand
- Bakhsh: Central
- Rural District: Dust Mohammad

Population (2006)
  - Total: 233
- Time zone: UTC+3:30 (IRST)
  - Summer (DST): UTC+4:30 (IRDT)

Ali Khan-e Kachkul (Persian: عليخان کچکول, also Romanized as ʿAlī Khān-e Kachkūl; also known as ‘Alī Khān-e Kachūl) is a village in Dust Mohammad Rural District, in the Central District of Hirmand County, Sistan and Baluchestan Province, Iran. At the 2006 census, its population was 233, in 53 families.
