= Deh-e Mardeh, Margan =

Deh-e Mardeh دهمرده
- Village
- Location within Iran
- Coordinates: 31°03′33″N 61°36′45″E
- Country: Iran
- Province: Sistan and Baluchestan
- County: Hirmand
- Bakhsh: Central
- Rural District: Margan

Population (2006)
  - Total: 147
- Time zone: UTC+3:30 (IRST)
  - Summer (DST): UTC+4:30 (IRDT)

Deh-e Mardeh (Persian: دهمرده) is a village in Margan Rural District, in the Central District of Hirmand County, Sistan and Baluchestan Province, Iran. At the 2006 census, its population was 147, in 30 families.
