= Deh-e Fakhireh-ye Sofla =

Deh-e Fakhireh-ye Sofla ده فخيره سفلي
- Village
- Location within Iran
- Coordinates: 31°05′56″N 61°43′52″E
- Country: Iran
- Province: Sistan and Baluchestan
- County: Hirmand
- Bakhsh: Central
- Rural District: Margan

Population (2006)
  - Total: 108
- Time zone: UTC+3:30 (IRST)
  - Summer (DST): UTC+4:30 (IRDT)

Deh-e Fakhireh-ye Sofla (Persian: ده فخيره سفلي, also Romanized as Deh-e Fakhīreh-ye Soflá; also known as Deh-e Fakhīreh, Fakhīreh-ye Pā’īn, and Fakhīreh-ye Soflá) is a village in Margan Rural District, in the Central District of Hirmand County, Sistan and Baluchestan Province, Iran. At the 2006 census, its population was 108, in 26 families.
