= Rasul, Iran =

Rasul (Persian: رسول) in Iran may refer to:

- Rasul-e Afghan
- Rasul-e Sarani
