= Khak-e Sefid =

Khak-e Sefid (Persian: خاك سفيد) may refer to:

- Khak-e Sefid, Kerman
- Khak-e Sefid, Sistan and Baluchestan
