= Yusof Zehi =

Yusof Zehi or Yusef Zehi (Persian: يوسف زهي) may refer to:

- Yusof Zehi, Chabahar
- Yusef Zehi, Hirmand
