= Fakhireh =

Fakhireh (Persian: فخيره) may refer to:

- Fakhireh-ye Olya
- Fakhireh-ye Sofla
