= Deh-e Ali Khan =

Deh-e Ali Khan (Persian: ده عليخان) may refer to:

- Deh-e Ali Khan, Markazi
- Deh-e Ali Khan, Sistan and Baluchestan
- Deh-e Ali Khan, alternate name of Ali Khan, Sistan and Baluchestan
