= Deh-e Fakhireh =

Deh-e Fakhireh ده فخيره
- Village
- Location within Iran
- Coordinates: 31°09′59″N 61°43′13″E
- Country: Iran
- Province: Sistan and Baluchestan
- County: Hirmand
- Bakhsh: Central
- Rural District: Margan

Population (2006)
  - Total: 112
- Time zone: UTC+3:30 (IRST)
  - Summer (DST): UTC+4:30 (IRDT)

Deh-e Fakhireh (Persian: ده فخيره, also Romanized as Deh-e Fakhīreh; also known as Fakhīreh-ye Bālā and Fakhīreh-ye ‘Olyā) is a village in Margan Rural District, in the Central District of Hirmand County, Sistan and Baluchestan Province, Iran. At the 2006 census, its population was 112, in 24 families.
