= Seyyed Khan =

Seyyed Khan (Persian: سيدخان) may refer to either of two villages in Hirmand County, Sistan and Baluchestan Province, Iran:

- Seyyed Khan, Jahanabad
- Seyyed Khan, Qorqori
