= Deh-e Karam, Sistan and Baluchestan =

Deh-e Karam ده کرم
- Village
- Location within Iran
- Coordinates: 31°06′59″N 61°48′00″E
- Country: Iran
- Province: Sistan and Baluchestan
- County: Hirmand
- Bakhsh: Central
- Rural District: Dust Mohammad

Population (2006)
  - Total: 159
- Time zone: UTC+3:30 (IRST)
  - Summer (DST): UTC+4:30 (IRDT)

Deh-e Karam (Persian: ده کرم, also Romanized as Deh-e Karam; also known as Deh-e Karīm and Deh Garm) is a village in Dust Mohammad Rural District, in the Central District of Hirmand County, Sistan and Baluchestan Province, Iran. At the 2006 census, its population was 159, in 38 families.
