= Nayib-e Lajehi =

Nayib-e Lajehi نايب لجه اي
- Village
- Country: Iran
- Province: Sistan and Baluchestan
- County: Hirmand
- Bakhsh: Central
- Rural District: Jahanabad

Population (2006)
  - Total: 184
- Time zone: UTC+3:30 (IRST)
  - Summer (DST): UTC+4:30 (IRDT)

Nayib-e Lajehi (Persian: نايب لجه اي, also Romanized as Nāyīb-e Lajeh’ī) is a village in Jahanabad Rural District, in the Central District of Hirmand County, Sistan and Baluchestan Province, Iran. At the 2006 census, its population was 184, in 33 families.
