= Siadak, Hirmand =

Siadak سيادك
- Village
- Location within Iran
- Coordinates: 31°06′54″N 61°44′42″E
- Country: Iran
- Province: Sistan and Baluchestan
- County: Hirmand
- Bakhsh: Central
- Rural District: Margan

Population (2006)
  - Total: 115
- Time zone: UTC+3:30 (IRST)
  - Summer (DST): UTC+4:30 (IRDT)

Siadak (Persian: سيادك, also Romanized as Sīādak and Sīyādak; also known as Seyāhdak, Sīāhdag, and Sīāhdak) is a village in Margan Rural District, in the Central District of Hirmand County, Sistan and Baluchestan Province, Iran. At the 2006 census, its population was 115, in 31 families.
