= Deh-e Hasan, Dust Mohammad =

Deh-e Hasan ده حسن
- Village
- Location within Iran
- Coordinates: 31°02′12″N 61°46′29″E
- Country: Iran
- Province: Sistan and Baluchestan
- County: Hirmand
- Bakhsh: Central
- Rural District: Dust Mohammad

Population (2006)
  - Total: 42
- Time zone: UTC+3:30 (IRST)
  - Summer (DST): UTC+4:30 (IRDT)

Deh-e Hasan (Persian: ده حسن, also Romanized as Deh-e Ḩasan) is a village in Dust Mohammad Rural District, in the Central District of Hirmand County, Sistan and Baluchestan Province, Iran. At the 2006 census, its population was 42, in 9 families.
