= Şahkərəm =

Şahkərəm or Shahkaram or Shahkerem may refer to:

- Şahkərəm, Dashkasan, a village in the Dashkasan District of Azerbaijan
- Şahkərəm, Kalbajar, a village in the Kalbajar District of Azerbaijan
- Shahkaram, Isfahan, Iran
