= Rasul-e Afghan =

Rasul-e Afghan رسول افغان
- Village
- Location within Iran
- Coordinates: 31°10′02″N 61°40′20″E
- Country: Iran
- Province: Sistan and Baluchestan
- County: Hirmand
- Bakhsh: Central
- Rural District: Margan

Population (2006)
  - Total: 115
- Time zone: UTC+3:30 (IRST)
  - Summer (DST): UTC+4:30 (IRDT)

Rasul-e Afghan (Persian: رسول افغان, also Romanized as Rasūl-e Afghān) is a village in Margan Rural District, in the Central District of Hirmand County, Sistan and Baluchestan Province, Iran. At the 2006 census, its population was 115, in 25 families.
