= Saruni =

Saruni (Persian: سروني) may refer to:

- Saruni-ye Olya
- Saruni-ye Sofla
