= Deh-e Karam Mazraeh =

Deh-e Karam Mazraeh ده کرم مزرعه
- Village
- Location within Iran
- Coordinates: 31°10′57″N 61°43′52″E
- Country: Iran
- Province: Sistan and Baluchestan
- County: Hirmand
- Bakhsh: Central
- Rural District: Dust Mohammad

Population (2006)
  - Total: 157
- Time zone: UTC+3:30 (IRST)
  - Summer (DST): UTC+4:30 (IRDT)

Deh-e Karam Mazraeh (Persian: ده کرم مزرعه, also Romanized as Deh-e Karam Mazra‘eh; also known as Deh-e Karam and Karam) is a village in Dust Mohammad Rural District, in the Central District of Hirmand County, Sistan and Baluchestan Province, Iran. At the 2006 census, its population was 157, in 33 families.
