= Siadak Deh Mardeh =

Siadak Deh Mardeh سيا دک دهمرده
- Village
- Country: Iran
- Province: Sistan and Baluchestan
- County: Hirmand
- Bakhsh: Central
- Rural District: Margan

Population (2006)
  - Total: 167
- Time zone: UTC+3:30 (IRST)
  - Summer (DST): UTC+4:30 (IRDT)

Siadak Deh Mardeh (Persian: سيا دک دهمرده, also Romanized as Sīādak Deh Mardeh) is a village in Margan Rural District, in the Central District of Hirmand County, Sistan and Baluchestan Province, Iran. At the 2006 census, its population was 167, in 38 families.
