= Akbarabad, Hirmand =

Village in Sistan and Baluchestan province, Iran

Akbarabad Persian: اكبراباد
- Village
- Location within Iran
- Coordinates: 31°12′58″N 61°37′33″E
- Country: Iran
- Province: Sistan and Baluchestan
- County: Hirmand
- District: Qorqori
- Rural District: Akbarabad

Population (2016)
  - Total: 153
- Time zone: UTC+3:30 (IRST)

Akbarabad (Persian: اكبراباد) (Note: Also romanized as Akbarābād) is a village in, and the capital of, Akbarabad Rural District of Qorqori District, Hirmand County, (Note: Formerly Miyankongi County) Sistan and Baluchestan province, Iran.

== Demographics ==
=== Population ===
At the time of the 2006 National Census, the village's population was 148 in 31 households, when it was in Qorqori Rural District of the former Miyankongi District of Zabol County. The following census in 2011 counted 148 people in 37 households, by which time the district had been separated from the county in the establishment of Miyankongi County. (Note: Renamed Hirmand County) The rural district was transferred to the new Qorqori District, and Akbarabad was transferred to Akbarabad Rural District created in the district. The 2016 census measured the population of the village as 153 people in 41 households.
