= Khamr (disambiguation) =

Khamr generally refers to wine of fermented grapes or dates.

It may also refer to:

- Khamr, Iran, also known as Deh-e Khamr – a village in Sistan and Baluchestan Province, Iran
- Khamr, Iran, also known as Khamar-e Qalandaran – a village in Hormozgan Province, Iran
- Khamr, Yemen – a village in central west Yemen
