= Deh-e ʿAlī Khān, Sistan and Baluchestan =

Ali Khan عليخان
- Village
- Location within Iran
- Coordinates: 31°09′45″N 61°45′07″E
- Country: Iran
- Province: Sistan and Baluchestan
- County: Hirmand
- Bakhsh: Central
- Rural District: Margan

Population (2006)
  - Total: 66
- Time zone: UTC+3:30 (IRST)
  - Summer (DST): UTC+4:30 (IRDT)

Ali Khan (Persian: عليخان, also Romanized as ʿAlī Khān; also known as Deh-e ‘Alī Khān) is a village in Margan Rural District, in the Central District of Hirmand County, Sistan and Baluchestan Province, Iran. At the 2006 census, its population was 66, with 14 families.
