= Serani (disambiguation) =

Serani is the stage name of Jamaican singer Craig Serani Marsh.

Serani may also refer to:

- Alejandro Serani (1901–1982), Chilean lawyer and politician
- Deborah Serani (born 1961), American psychologist and author
- Serani or Kristang people, a creole ethnic group originating in the Malay Peninsula
- Șerani, a village in Romania
- Șerani River, Romania

== See also ==
- Lucio Serrani (born 1961), Italian retired hammer thrower
- Serrani, members of the Serranus family in the ancient Roman Atilia gens
- Sarani (disambiguation)
- Šarani (disambiguation)
- Šurany, Slovakia, a town
  - ŠK Šurany, a football club based in the town
