= Khak-e Sefidi =

Village in Sistan and Baluchestan province, Iran

Khak-e Sefidi Persian: خاك سفيدي
- Village
- Location within Iran
- Coordinates: 31°14′43″N 61°34′32″E
- Country: Iran
- Province: Sistan and Baluchestan
- County: Hirmand
- District: Qorqori
- Rural District: Akbarabad

Population (2016)
  - Total: 1,094
- Time zone: UTC+3:30 (IRST)

Khak-e Sefidi (Persian: خاك سفيدي) (Note: Also romanized as Khāk-e Sefīdī; also known as Khāk-e Sefīd) is a village in Akbarabad Rural District of Qorqori District, Hirmand County, (Note: Formerly Miyankongi County) Sistan and Baluchestan province, Iran.

== Demographics ==
=== Population ===
At the time of the 2006 National Census, the village's population was 982 in 191 households, when it was in Qorqori Rural District of the former Miyankongi District of Zabol County. The following census in 2011 counted 1,096 people in 239 households, by which time the district had been separated from the county in the establishment of Miyankongi County. (Note: Renamed Hirmand County) The rural district was transferred to the new Qorqori District, and Khak-e Sefidi was transferred to Akbarabad Rural District created in the district. The 2016 census measured the population of the village as 1,094 people in 224 households. It was the most populous village in its rural district.
