= Akbarabad Rural District =

Rural district in Sistan and Baluchestan province, Iran

Akbarabad Rural District Persian: دهستان اکبرآباد
- Rural District
- Location within Iran
- Coordinates: 31°17′35″N 61°33′55″E
- Country: Iran
- Province: Sistan and Baluchestan
- County: Hirmand
- District: Qorqori
- Capital: Akbarabad

Population (2016)
  - Total: 4,396
- Time zone: UTC+3:30 (IRST)

Akbarabad Rural District (Persian: دهستان اکبرآباد) is in Qorqori District of Hirmand County, (Note: Formerly Miyankongi County) Sistan and Baluchestan province, Iran. Its capital is the village of Akbarabad.

== History ==
After the 2006 National Census, Miyankongi District was separated from Zabol County in the establishment of Miyankongi County, (Note: Renamed Hirmand County) and Akbarabad Rural District was created in the new Qorqori District.

== Demographics ==
=== Population ===
At the time of the 2011 census, the rural district's population was 4,110 inhabitants in 942 households. The 2016 census measured the population of the rural district as 4,396 in 1,031 households. The most populous of its 40 villages was Khak-e Sefidi, with 1,094 people.
