= Nayib =

Nayib is a masculine given name, likely of Arabic origin. Notable people with the given name include:

- Nayib Bukele (born 1981), Salvadoran politician and businessman, 81st president of El Salvador
- Nayib Lagouireh (born 1991), Belgian footballer

== See also ==
- Nayib-e Lajehi, a village in Sistan and Baluchestan Province, Iran
