= Saleh Khan =

Saleh Khan (Persian: صالح خان) may refer to:

- Saleh Khan, Hirmand, a village in Iran
- Saleh Muhammad Khan, Pakistani politician
