= Seyyed Khan, Qorqori =

Seyyed Khan سيدخان
- Village
- Location within Iran
- Coordinates: 31°05′33″N 61°48′05″E
- Country: Iran
- Province: Sistan and Baluchestan
- County: Hirmand
- Bakhsh: Qorqori
- Rural District: Qorqori

Population (2006)
  - Total: 33
- Time zone: UTC+3:30 (IRST)
  - Summer (DST): UTC+4:30 (IRDT)

Seyyed Khan (Persian: سيدخان, also Romanized as Seyyed Khān; also known as Seyyed Khān Bar Āhū’ī) is a village in Qorqori Rural District, Qorqori District, Hirmand County, Sistan and Baluchestan Province, Iran. At the 2006 census, its population was 33, in 4 families.
