= Deh-e Mardeh, Qorqori =

Deh-e Mardeh دهمرده
- Village
- Location within Iran
- Coordinates: 31°10′11″N 61°36′59″E
- Country: Iran
- Province: Sistan and Baluchestan
- County: Hirmand
- Bakhsh: Qorqori
- Rural District: Qorqori

Population (2006)
  - Total: 333
- Time zone: UTC+3:30 (IRST)
  - Summer (DST): UTC+4:30 (IRDT)

Deh-e Mardeh (Persian: دهمرده) is a village in Qorqori Rural District, Qorqori District, Hirmand County, Sistan and Baluchestan Province, Iran. At the 2006 census, its population was 333, in 66 families.
