= Ali Khan-e Zaman =

Ali Khan-e Zaman عليخان زمان
- Village
- Location within Iran
- Coordinates: 31°12′44″N 61°43′19″E
- Country: Iran
- Province: Sistan and Baluchestan
- County: Hirmand
- Bakhsh: Qorqori
- Rural District: Qorqori

Population (2006)
  - Total: 222
- Time zone: UTC+3:30 (IRST)
  - Summer (DST): UTC+4:30 (IRDT)

Ali Khan-e Zaman (Persian: عليخان زمان, also Romanized as ʿAlī Khān-e Zamān; also known as ‘Alīkhān-e Zamān and Deh-e ‘Alīkhān-e Zamān) is a village in Qorqori Rural District, Qorqori District, Hirmand County, Sistan and Baluchestan Province, Iran. At the 2006 census, its population was 222, in 50 families.
