= Qaratağlar =

- Location within Azerbaijan
- Coordinates: 40°25′N 46°06′E
- Country: Azerbaijan
- Rayon: Dashkasan
- Municipality: Qaraqullar
- Time zone: UTC+4 (AZT)
  - Summer (DST): UTC+5 (AZT)

Qaratağlar (also, Karataglar) is a village in the Dashkasan Rayon of Azerbaijan. The village forms part of the municipality of Qaraqullar.
