= Dust Mohammad =

City in Sistan and Baluchestan province, Iran

Dust Mohammad Persian: دوست محمد
- City
- Location within Iran
- Coordinates: 31°08′43″N 61°47′30″E
- Country: Iran
- Province: Sistan and Baluchestan
- County: Hirmand
- District: Central

Population (2016)
  - Total: 6,621
- Time zone: UTC+3:30 (IRST)

Dust Mohammad (Persian: دوست محمد) (Note: Also romanized as Dūst Moḩammad; also known as Dūst Moḩammad Khān) is a city in the Central District of Hirmand County, (Note: Formerly Miyankongi County) Sistan and Baluchestan province, Iran, serving as capital of both the county the district. It is also the administrative center for Dust Mohammad Rural District.

== Demographics ==
=== Population ===
At the time of the 2006 National Census, the city's population was 6,902 in 1,328 households, when it was capital of the former Miyankongi District of Zabol County. The following census in 2011 counted 6,774 people in 1,378 households, by which time the district had been separated from the county in the establishment of Miyankongi County. (Note: Renamed Hirmand County) The city and the rural district were transferred to the new Central District, with Dust Mohammad as the county's capital. The 2016 census measured the population of the city as 6,621 people in 1,412 households.
