= Deh-e Ali Khan, Markazi =

Deh-e Ali Khan ده عليخان
- Village
- Location within Iran
- Coordinates: 33°45′51″N 49°03′10″E
- Country: Iran
- Province: Markazi
- County: Shazand
- Bakhsh: Sarband
- Rural District: Malmir

Population (2006)
  - Total: 89
- Time zone: UTC+3:30 (IRST)
  - Summer (DST): UTC+4:30 (IRDT)

Deh-e Ali Khan (Persian: ده عليخان, also Romanized as Deh-e ‘Alī Khān and Deh ‘Alī Khān) is a village in Malmir Rural District, Sarband District, Shazand County, Markazi Province, Iran. At the 2006 census, its population was 89, in 27 families.
