= Şahkərəm, Dashkasan =

Şahkərəm
- Location within Azerbaijan
- Coordinates: 40°24′N 46°08′E
- Country: Azerbaijan
- Rayon: Dashkasan
- Municipality: Qaraqullar
- Time zone: UTC+4 (AZT)
  - Summer (DST): UTC+5 (AZT)

Şahkərəm (also, Shakhkerem) is a village in the Dashkasan Rayon of Azerbaijan. The village forms part of the municipality of Qaraqullar.
