= Šarani =

Šarani may refer to:

- Šarani (Gornji Milanovac), a village in the municipality of Gornji Milanovac, Serbia
- Šarani, Trebinje, a village in the municipality of Trebinje, Republika Srpska, Bosnia and Herzegovina

== See also ==
- Sarani (disambiguation)
