= Yusof Zehi, Chabahar =

Yusof Zehi يوسف زهي
- Village
- Location within Iran
- Coordinates: 25°35′44″N 61°10′53″E
- Country: Iran
- Province: Sistan and Baluchestan
- County: Chabahar
- Bakhsh: Polan
- Rural District: Polan

Population (2006)
  - Total: 158
- Time zone: UTC+3:30 (IRST)
  - Summer (DST): UTC+4:30 (IRDT)

Yusof Zehi (Persian: يوسف زهي, also Romanized as Yūsof Zehī; also known as Yūsof Bāzār) is a village in Polan Rural District, Polan District, Chabahar County, Sistan and Baluchestan Province, Iran. At the 2006 census, its population was 158, in 32 families.
