= Khak-e Sefid-e Bala =

Khak-e Sefid-e Bala خاک‌سفید بالا
- Village
- Location within Iran
- Coordinates: 29°16′03″N 57°14′49″E
- Country: Iran
- Province: Kerman
- County: Jiroft
- Bakhsh: Sarduiyeh
- Rural District: Sarduiyeh

Population (2006)
  - Total: 192
- Time zone: UTC+3:30 (IRST)
  - Summer (DST): UTC+4:30 (IRDT)

Khak-e Sefid-e Bala (Persian: خاک‌سفید بالا, also Romanized as Khāk-e Sefīd-e Bālā; also known as Khāk-e Sefīd and Khāk Sefīd) is a village in Sarduiyeh Rural District, Sarduiyeh District, Jiroft County, Kerman Province, Iran. At the 2006 census, its population was 192, in 41 families.
