= Deh-e Hoseyn, Markazi =

Village in Markazi, Iran

Deh-e Hoseyn ده حسين
- Village
- Location within Iran
- Coordinates: 33°45′27″N 49°17′10″E
- Country: Iran
- Province: Markazi
- County: Shazand
- Bakhsh: Sarband
- Rural District: Hendudar

Population (2006)
  - Total: 70
- Time zone: UTC+3:30 (IRST)
  - Summer (DST): UTC+4:30 (IRDT)

Deh-e Hoseyn (Persian: ده حسين, also Romanized as Deh-e Ḩoseyn and Deh Ḩoseyn; also known as Deh-e Ḩasan and Deh Husain) is a village in Hendudar Rural District, Sarband District, Shazand County, Markazi Province, Iran. At the 2006 census, its population was 70, in 20 families.
