= Saruni-ye Olya =

Saruni-ye Olya سروني عليا
- Village
- Location within Iran
- Coordinates: 28°34′33″N 57°46′50″E
- Country: Iran
- Province: Kerman
- County: Jiroft
- Bakhsh: Central
- Rural District: Eslamabad

Population (2006)
  - Total: 201
- Time zone: UTC+3:30 (IRST)
  - Summer (DST): UTC+4:30 (IRDT)

Saruni-ye Olya (Persian: سروني عليا, also Romanized as Sarūnī-ye ‘Olyā; also known as Sarānī-ye Bālā) is a village in Eslamabad Rural District, in the Central District of Jiroft County, Kerman Province, Iran. At the 2006 census, its population was 201, in 45 families.
