= Saruni-ye Sofla =

Saruni-ye Sofla سروني سفلي
- Village
- Location within Iran
- Coordinates: 28°33′07″N 57°47′18″E
- Country: Iran
- Province: Kerman
- County: Jiroft
- Bakhsh: Central
- Rural District: Eslamabad

Population (2006)
  - Total: 345
- Time zone: UTC+3:30 (IRST)
  - Summer (DST): UTC+4:30 (IRDT)

Saruni-ye Sofla (Persian: سروني سفلي, also Romanized as Sarūnī-ye Soflá; also known as Sarānī-ye Pā’īn) is a village in Eslamabad Rural District, in the Central District of Jiroft County, Kerman Province, Iran. At the 2006 census, its population was 345, in 71 families.
