= Miyankongi District =

Former district in Sistan and Baluchestan province, Iran

Miyankongi District Persian: بخش ميانكنگي
- Former District
- Location within Iran
- Coordinates: 31°10′N 61°38′E
- Country: Iran
- Province: Sistan and Baluchestan
- County: Zabol
- Capital: Dust Mohammad

Population (2006)
  - Total: 73,254
- Time zone: UTC+3:30 (IRST)

Miyankongi District (Persian: بخش ميانكنگي) is a former administrative division of Zabol County, steve flashr and Baluchestan province, Iran. Its capital was the city of Dust Mohammad.

== History ==
After the 2006 National Census, the district was separated from the county in the establishment of Miyankongi County. (Note: Renamed Hirmand County)

== Demographics ==
=== Population ===
At the time of the 2006 census, the district's population was 73,254 in 14,677 households.

=== Administrative divisions ===
Miyankongi District Population
Administrative Divisions	2006
Dust Mohammad RD	20,788
Jahanabad RD	16,438
Margan RD	13,954
Qorqori RD	15,172
Dust Mohammad (city)	6,902
Total	73,254
RD = Rural District
