= Jahanabad Rural District =

Rural district in Sistan and Baluchestan province, Iran

Jahanabad Rural District Persian: دهستان جهان آباد
- Rural District
- Location within Iran
- Coordinates: 31°00′33″N 61°44′25″E
- Country: Iran
- Province: Sistan and Baluchestan
- County: Hirmand
- District: Central
- Capital: Jahanabad-e Sofla

Population (2016)
  - Total: 15,069
- Time zone: UTC+3:30 (IRST)

Jahanabad Rural District (Persian: دهستان جهان آباد) is in the Central District of Hirmand County, (Note: Formerly Miyankongi County) Sistan and Baluchestan province, Iran. Its capital is the village of Jahanabad-e Sofla.

== Demographics ==
=== Population ===
At the time of the 2006 National Census, the rural district's population (as a part of the former Miyankongi District of Zabol County) was 16,438 in 3,178 households. There were 15,062 inhabitants in 3,491 households at the following census of 2011, by which time the district had been separated from the county in the establishment of Miyankongi County. (Note: Renamed Hirmand County) The rural district was transferred to the new Central District. The 2016 census measured the population of the rural district as 15,069 in 3,879 households. The most populous of its 60 villages was Sanjarani, with 1,914 people.
