= Margan Rural District =

Rural district in Sistan and Baluchestan province, Iran

Margan Rural District Persian: دهستان مارگان
- Rural District
- Location within Iran
- Coordinates: 31°07′56″N 61°39′33″E
- Country: Iran
- Province: Sistan and Baluchestan
- County: Hirmand
- District: Central
- Capital: Margan

Population (2016)
  - Total: 12,355
- Time zone: UTC+3:30 (IRST)

Margan Rural District (Persian: دهستان مارگان) is in the Central District of Hirmand County, (Note: Formerly Miyankongi County) Sistan and Baluchestan province, Iran. Its capital is the village of Margan.

== Demographics ==
=== Population ===
At the time of the 2006 National Census, the rural district's population (as a part of the former Miyankongi District of Zabol County) was 13,954 in 2,833 households. There were 11,119 inhabitants in 2,573 households at the following census of 2011, by which time the district had been separated from the county in the establishment of Miyankongi County. (Note: Renamed Hirmand County) The rural district was transferred to the new Central District. The 2016 census measured the population of the rural district as 12,355 in 3,107 households. The most populous of its 103 villages was Jahan Tigh, with 798 people.
