= Dust Mohammad Rural District =

Rural district in Sistan and Baluchestan province, Iran

Dust Mohammad Rural District Persian: دهستان دوست محمد
- Rural District
- Location within Iran
- Coordinates: 31°06′48″N 61°45′28″E
- Country: Iran
- Province: Sistan and Baluchestan
- County: Hirmand
- District: Central
- Capital: Dust Mohammad

Population (2016)
  - Total: 16,742
- Time zone: UTC+3:30 (IRST)

Dust Mohammad Rural District (Persian: دهستان دوست محمد) is in the Central District of Hirmand County, (Note: Formerly Miyankongi County) Sistan and Baluchestan province, Iran. It is administered from the city of Dust Mohammad.

== Demographics ==
=== Population ===
At the time of the 2006 National Census, the rural district's population (as a part of the former Miyankongi District of Zabol County) was 20,788 in 4,264 households. There were 17,972 inhabitants in 4,173 households at the following census of 2011, by which time the district had been separated from the county in the establishment of Miyankongi County. (Note: Renamed Hirmand County). The rural district was transferred to the new Central District. The 2016 census measured the population of the rural district as 16,742 in 4,669 households. The most populous of its 103 villages was Deh-e Khamr, with 1,119 people.
