= Central District (Hirmand County) =

District in Sistan and Baluchestan province, Iran

Central District (Hirmand County) Persian: بخش مرکزی شهرستان هیرمند
- District
- Location within Iran
- Coordinates: 31°04′09″N 61°42′26″E
- Country: Iran
- Province: Sistan and Baluchestan
- County: Hirmand
- Capital: Dust Mohammad

Population (2016)
  - Total: 50,787
- Time zone: UTC+3:30 (IRST)

The Central District of Hirmand County (Persian: بخش مرکزی شهرستان هیرمند) (Note: Formerly Miyankongi County) is in Sistan and Baluchestan province, Iran. Its capital is the city of Dust Mohammad.

== History ==
After the 2006 National Census, Miyankongi District was separated from Zabol County in the establishment of Miyankongi County, (Note: Renamed Hirmand County) which was divided into two districts and five rural districts, with Dust Mohammad as its capital and only city at the time.

== Demographics ==
=== Population ===
At the time of the 2011 census, the district's population was 50,927 people in 11,615 households. The 2016 census measured the population of the district as 50,787 inhabitants in 13,067 households.

=== Administrative divisions ===
Central District (Hirmand County) Population
Administrative Divisions	2011	2016
Dust Mohammad RD	17,972	16,742
Jahanabad RD	15,062	15,069
Margan RD	11,119	12,355
Dust Mohammad (city)	6,774	6,621
Total	50,927	50,787
RD = Rural District
