= Hirmand County =

County in Sistan and Baluchestan province, Iran

Hirmand County Persian: شهرستان هیرمند
- County
- Location of Hirmand County in Sistan and Baluchestan province (top right, pink)

- Location of Sistan and Baluchestan province in Iran
- Coordinates: 31°10′N 61°38′E
- Country: Iran
- Province: Sistan and Baluchestan
- Capital: Dust Mohammad
- Districts: Central, Qorqori

Population (2016)
  - Total: 63,979
- Time zone: UTC+3:30 (IRST)

Hirmand County (Persian: شهرستان هیرمند) (Note: Formerly Miyankongi County (شهرستان ميانكنگي)) is in Sistan and Baluchestan province, Iran. Its capital is the city of Dust Mohammad.

== History ==
After the 2006 National Census, Miyankongi District was separated from Zabol County in the establishment of Miyankongi County, (Note: Renamed Hirmand County) which was divided into two districts and five rural districts, with Dust Mohammad as its capital and only city at the time. After the 2016 census, the village of Qorqori was elevated to the status of a city.

== Demographics ==
=== Population ===
At the time of the 2011 census, the county's population was 65,471 people in 14,835 households. The 2016 census measured the population of the county as 63,979 in 16,559 households.

=== Administrative divisions ===
Hirmand County's population history and administrative structure over two consecutive censuses are shown in the following table.

Hirmand County Population
Administrative Divisions	2011	2016
Central District	50,927	50,787
Dust Mohammad RD	17,972	16,742
Jahanabad RD	15,062	15,069
Margan RD	11,119	12,355
Dust Mohammad (city)	6,774	6,621
Qorqori District	14,544	13,192
Akbarabad RD	4,110	4,396
Qorqori RD	10,434	8,796
Qorqori (city) (Note: Became a city after the 2016 census)		
Total	65,471	63,979
RD = Rural District

== See also ==
Media related to Hirmand County at Wikimedia Commons
