= List of cities, towns and villages in Sistan and Baluchestan province =

The following is the List of cities, towns and villages in Sistan and Baluchestan Province in Iran.

== Alphabetically ==
Cities are in bold text; all others are villages.

=== A ===
Ab Anar | Ab Anbar | Ab Chekan | Ab Duzak-e Pain | Ab Gushtukan | Ab Namard | Ab Shirin | Abadan | Abadan | Abadi Kharut | Abady Emam Zeman | Abak Ziri Haj Shir Mohammad | Aband | Abayegan | Abbas Abdollah | Abbas Bazar | Abbas Rostam | Abbas Shah Gol | Abbasabad | Abbasabad | Abbasabad | Abbasabad | Abbasabad | Abbasabad-e Senjadi | Abbasabad-e Sheykh Visi | Abbasiyeh | Abchegi | Abd ol Aziz | Abd ol Azizabad | Abd ol Ghafur | Abdol Ghani Brick Works | Abdol Rahman Safarzayi | Abdol Rahman Sarani | Abdolabad | Abdollah Bazar | Abdollahabad | Abdollahabad | Abdu Zehi | Abeshki | Abgah | Abgurandan | Abil | Abil Pol Randeh | Abkas | Abrin | Abtar | Abzan | Achkidar | Achu Bazar | Adamabad-e Baluchi Now | Adelabad | Adernag | Adimi | Adireh | Afghan | Afsalabad | Afshan | Afzalabad | Afzalabad | Afzalabad | Afzalabad | Afzalabad | Afzalabad | Afzalabad | Afzalabad-e Pain | Agosk | Agrestan | Agrichan | Agund | Ahmadabad ol Masaki | Ahmadabad | Ahmadabad | Ahmadabad | Ahmadabad | Ahmadabad | Ahmadabad | Ahmadabad | Ahmadabad | Ahmadabad | Ahmadabad | Ahmadabad | Ahmadabad | Ahmadabad | Ahmadabad-e Bogan | Ahmadabad-e Durban | Ahmadabad-e Gurak | Ahmadabad-e Vashnam | Ahu Ab | Ahugan | Akbarabad | Akbarabad | Akbarabad | Akbarabad | Akbarabad | Akbarabad | Akbarabad | Akhundzadeh | Akramabad | Akshi | Al Gari | Al Gorg | Al Gorg | Alamabad | Alamabad | Alanjan-e Do | Alari | Ali Akbar Khamr | Ali Bakshabad | Ali Dar | Ali Hoseyna | Ali Jafar-e Sofla | Ali Khan | Ali Khan-e Kachkul | Ali Khan-e Zaman | Ali Modad | Ali Mohammad Bazar | Ali Mohammad-e Pir Morad | Ali Moradan | Ali Morady | Ali Piri | Ali Reza | Ali Tigh | Aliabad | Aliabad | Aliabad | Aliabad | Aliabad | Aliabad | Aliabad | Aliabad | Aliabad | Aliabad | Aliabad | Aliabad | Aliabad | Aliabad | Aliabad | Aliabad | Aliabad | Aliabad-e Bala | Aliabad-e Bogan | Aliabad-e Chagardak | Aliabad-e Chah Chamran | Aliabad-e Chah Zar | Aliabad-e Garnechin | Aliabad-e Goldasht | Aliabad-e Kargah | Aliabad-e Ladi | Aliabad-e Pain | Aliabad-e Pudchah | Alijan-e Darvish | Ali-ye Sufi | Aliyeh Dorudy | Allah Dad | Allah Dad-e Zehi | Allah Dow | Allah Now Bazar | Allahabad | Allahabad | Allahabad | Allahabad | Allahabad | Allahabad | Allahabad | Allahabad | Allahabad | Allahabad | Allahabad | Allahabad | Allahabad | Allahabad | Allahabad-e Baku | Allahabad-e Bala | Allahabad-e Dumak | Allahabad-e Luchu | Allahabad-e Minuyi | Allahabad-e Rowghani | Allahabad-e Sulkuk | Allahadadabad | Allahi | Allahiabad | Amanabad | Amidiyeh-ye Chah Zar | Aminabad | Amir Nezam | Amir | Amirabad | Amirabad | Amirabad | Amirabad | Amirabad | Amrabad | Amrudi | Anar Shahi | Anaran | Anaran | Anaran | Anari Dap | Anari | Anari | Anarmantak | Anaruk | Andeh | Angiar | Angurabad | Anguri | Angury | Anjerah | Anjerak-e Pain | Anjir Mehi | Anjirak | Anjirak | Anjirak | Anjirak | Anjirak-e Bala | Anjirak-e Pain | Anjirak-e Shahrak Shurchah | Anjiraki | Anjiruk | Anushirvan | Anvarabad | Anza | Apak Chushan | Apareng | Apatan | Apatan | Apudam | Arab Zehi | Arag Khan Malek | Aram Gan | Arbabi | Arbabi | Archini | Arefabad | Arefabad | Army Garrison | Aru Sajahi | Arzantak | Arzaq | Arzuni | As Hajji | Asak | Asak | Asan Kuh | Asanu | Asda | As-e Qazi | Asghar Jama | Ashar | Asheqan | Askan | Askuh | Aspi Tir | Aspich | Ata Mohammad | Avaran | Ay Beyk | Aydow Bazar | Azad Gaz | Azad | Azadabad | Azadi | Azadi-ye Olya | Azadi-ye Vosta | Azadkur | Azarabad | Azati-ye Sofla | Azgandi | Azimabad | Azimabad | Azizabad | Azizabad | Azizabad | Azizabad | Azizabad | Azizabad | Azizabad | Azizabad | Azizabad | Azizabad | Azizabad-e Golestan | Aziz-e Bamadi | Azmanabad

=== B ===
Ba Seyyedi | Babaskan | Babdui | Bachiri-ye Pir | Bad Bozorg | Bad Kuchek | Bafatan | Bag | Bag | Bagak | Bagalu | Bagh | Baghak | Baghak | Baghdaniyeh | Bagh-e Ghadir | Bagh-e Nil | Bagi Hanz | Bagu | Baha ol Din | Bahadorabad | Bahlir Sirjah | Bahrabad | Bahramabad | Bahramabad | Bahramabad | Bahu Kalat | Bajar Bazar | Bajiri | Bajukan | Bak | Bakhtak-e Bala | Bakhti-ye Bala | Bakjud | Bakur | Bal | Bala Khaneh | Bala Qaleh | Bala Sheykh | Balad | Balak | Balal | Balalabad | Balalabad | Bal-e Bala | Bal-e Pain | Baleshti | Ball-e Dad Rahman | Baluch Ab | Baluch Abil | Baluch Naruyi | Baluch Recreational Complex | Baluchabad | Baluchabad-e Kahnaki | Baluchi | Baluchi-ye Bala | Baluchi-ye Pain | Baluchkan | Bam Dust | Bam Pishi | Bambasari | Bameri | Bameri-ye Jahan Tigh | Bampur | Banab | Banab | Banaru | Band Dar | Band Sar Chukat | Band Sar Molla Ahmad Bazar | Band Sar | Bandaman | Bandaman-e Pain | Bandan | Bandanbegi | Bandar Dap | Bandar-e Tang | Band-e Lal Mohammad | Band-e Osman Bazar | Bandehi | Banderan | Bandgahdan | Bandgah-e Pir Sohrab | Bandigan | Bandini Kursar | Bandsar | Bangelisur | Bangelui | Bangelzehi | Bani-ye Shib | Banrig | Bansont | Bapatan | Bapi | Baqerabad | Bar Abak | Bar Ahui | Barakeh | Barani | Barasan Riding Club | Barashk | Barataki | Bardarak | Bareh Puz Qaribabad-e Mowtowr-e Ebrahim | Barekatabad | Barg | Barg Dan | Bargin Zeh | Bariz | Barqi | Barzan Den | Barziar | Barzin Dan | Basiran | Basut-e Bala | Basut-e Hajji Hasan | Batagi Dan | Batak | Batli | Bavaridan | Bayan | Bayatabad | Baz Piran | Bazar Ahmad Sanjar | Bazar Madan Chah | Bazar Pir Mohammad | Bazarkabad | Bazgan | Bazi Shahraki | Bazigar | Bazm Balum | Bazm | Bazmahi | Bazman | Bechahanak | Bechu Bazar | Beheshtabad | Beheshtabad | Beheshtabad | Beheshtabad-e Sharif | Behesht-e Dar Kavir | Beheshtiabad | Behjatabad | Bel Pir | Belaftan | Belengi | Bennah | Bent | Bent | Benuk | Beris | Berisk | Berkat Tush | Beryani | Beshaneh | Bezanjekan | Bi Ban Zehi | Biahu Dushing-e Pain | Bibah | Bichand | Bid Bag | Bid Lang | Bid | Bida Setar | Bidak | Bidak-e Bala | Bidak-e Pain | Bidan | Bidan Sarzeh | Bidarabad | Bidi | Bidlad | Biduk-e Bala | Biduk-e Murtak | Biduk-e Pain | Bigdag | Bilari | Binag | Birdaf | Bir-e Bala | Bir-e Rasul Bakhsh | Bir-e Sofla | Birmin | Bistak | Bitab | Bitich | Bitijedap | Bogan | Boghdan | Bok | Bol | Bolandan | Bolbol | Bon Abashi | Bon Deh | Bon Gir | Bon Kel | Bon Rud Mohammad Heyyat | Bon Rud | Bon Rud | Bonab | Bondabi | Bongar | Bonguh | Bonjar | Bonseptk | Bonu | Borhanabad | Borj-e Afghan | Borj-e Mirgol | Bormok | Brahui | Brahuyi | Brick Factory | Buchchi | Bufkan | Bug Station | Bugakabad | Buk | Buk White Granite Quarry | Buk-e Hormak | Bulani | Bumask | Bundi | Bur Sar | Burak | Burdaran | Burgar | Burniduk | Bursar | Burta | Burui | Bustan | Buti-ye Bala | Buti-ye Pain

=== C ===
Camp Office | Chabahar | Chacheragh | Chad-e Bala | Chad-e Pain | Chaderak | Chagherbit-e Bala | Chagherbit-e Pain | Chagugdan | Chah | Chah Kash | Chah Lashkaran-e Bala | Chah Lashkaran-e Pain | Chah Maldari-ye Abdol Ghani | Chah Maldari-ye Abdollah | Chah Maldari-ye Allahdad | Chah Maldari-ye Esmail Hasan | Chah Maldari-ye Hajji Mohammad | Chah Maldary-e Ahmad Naruyi | Chah Maldary-e Anur Nuti Zehi | Chah Maldary-e Harun | Chah Maldary-e Morad Mir Baluch Zehi | Chah Maldary-e Nuti Zehi | Chah Maldary-e Pati Mohammad Tuta Zehi | Chah Maldary-e Talarak | Chah Mirak | Chah Mowtowr-e Teymury | Chah Nandeh | Chah Shomareh-ye 15 | Chah Shomareh-ye Chahar Mohammad | Chah Shomareh-ye Do Mir Hoseyni | Chah Shomareh-ye Haft Shaharki | Chah Shomareh-ye Panj Deh Mardeh | Chah Shomareh-ye Shesh Sarani | Chah Shomareh-ye Yek Akbarian | Chah Shur-e Seh | Chah Shur-e Shomareh-ye Do | Chah Shur-e Shomareh-ye Yek | Chah Zaman | Chah Zard | Chah Zilan | Chahak | Chahak | Chahak | Chahak | Chahan | Chahan | Chahan | Chahar Biti | Chahar Cheshm | Chahar Khami | Chahar Suleh Station | Chah-e Abdol Majid | Chah-e Abdol Teyf | Chah-e Abdollah | Chah-e Abdollah | Chah-e Abdollah | Chah-e Abdolrahman | Chah-e Ahmad | Chah-e Ahmad | Chah-e Alam Shah Bakhsh | Chah-e Ali Pangi | Chah-e Ali | Chah-e Ali | Chah-e Alikhan | Chah-e Allah Bakhsh | Chah-e Alu | Chah-e Alvand | Chah-e Amid | Chah-e Asiabi | Chah-e Azam | Chah-e Azim | Chah-e Aziz | Chah-e Baharshah | Chah-e Bahram Dust Mohammad | Chah-e Baluch Khan | Chah-e Baluch | Chah-e Bid | Chah-e Bist va Do-e Bahman | Chah-e Dad Rahim | Chah-e Dadkhoda | Chah-e Damban | Chah-e Damdari | Chah-e Damdary Bahader Khan | Chah-e Danak | Chah-e Dar Mohammad | Chah-e Dar Mohammad Makam | Chah-e Davud | Chah-e Dazu | Chah-e Dekal | Chah-e Deldar | Chah-e Din Mohammad Nabayikh | Chah-e Divan | Chah-e Ebrahim | Chah-e Eid Mohammad | Chah-e Eslam | Chah-e Esmail | Chah-e Faqir | Chah-e Feyz Mohammad | Chah-e Feyz Mohammad | Chah-e Gahi | Chah-e Gahi | Chah-e Ganj | Chah-e Gargin | Chah-e Garuk | Chah-e Ghani | Chah-e Ghani | Chah-e Gholam | Chah-e Gholam Shah | Chah-e Gol Mohammad | Chah-e Golshanabad | Chah-e Gomshad | Chah-e Gurik | Chah-e Hajj Mahmud | Chah-e Hajj Qader Bakhsh | Chah-e Hajji Abbas | Chah-e Hajji Ahmad | Chah-e Hajji Baha ol Din | Chah-e Hajji Dadallah | Chah-e Hajji Del Morad | Chah-e Hajji Gholam Nabi | Chah-e Hajji Isa | Chah-e Hajji Jelal | Chah-e Hajji Karim | Chah-e Hajji Kichi Mianru | Chah-e Hajji Shah Mohammad | Chah-e Hajji Siah Khan | Chah-e Hamal | Chah-e Hamel Sheh Bakhsh | Chah-e Hasan | Chah-e Hasan | Chah-e Hasan | Chah-e Hashem | Chah-e Heydar | Chah-e Hoseyn | Chah-e Hoseyn | Chah-e Hoseyni | Chah-e Hut Abdol Aziz | Chah-e Isa Sheh Bakhsh | Chah-e Isa | Chah-e Isa | Chah-e Jahangir | Chah-e Jalal | Chah-e Jalal | Chah-e Jalal | Chah-e Jamal | Chah-e Jamshid | Chah-e Jelai | Chah-e Jomeh Khan | Chah-e Jomeh Khan | Chah-e Kalir | Chah-e Kalir | Chah-e Kamal Nurollah | Chah-e Kamal Siah Jinad | Chah-e Kamal | Chah-e Kamal | Chah-e Kan | Chah-e Karim | Chah-e Karim Bakhsh | Chah-e Karimabad | Chah-e Karshanian | Chah-e Khan Mohammad | Chah-e Khoda Bakhsh Allahdad | Chah-e Khoda Bakhsh | Chah-e Khoda Bakhsh | Chah-e Khodadad | Chah-e Kichi | Chah-e Kureh | Chah-e Mahmud Kalataki | Chah-e Mahmud | Chah-e Mahmud | Chah-e Majid Sheh Bakhsh | Chah-e Maldari Badi | Chah-e Malek | Chah-e Malek Sheh Bakhsh | Chah-e Marim | Chah-e Mehrab-e Chah-e Vali Mohammad | Chah-e Mir Jan | Chah-e Mir | Chah-e Mirhan | Chah-e Mirza | Chah-e Mirza | Chah-e Mohammad Bakhsh | Chah-e Mohammad Hoseyn | Chah-e Mohammad Omar Dasht Robat | Chah-e Mohammad Rahim | Chah-e Mohammad Selim | Chah-e Mohammad | Chah-e Mohammad | Chah-e Mohammad | Chah-e Mohammad | Chah-e Mohammadi | Chah-e Molla Fakhr ol Din | Chah-e Molla Isa | Chah-e Molla Musa | Chah-e Morad | Chah-e Mostafa Abbas Zehi | Chah-e Mulla Mohammad | Chah-e Musa | Chah-e Nabi Bakhsh | Chah-e Nabiabad | Chah-e Nali | Chah-e Navvab | Chah-e Nawab | Chah-e Nawabzadeh | Chah-e Nazer | Chah-e Nik Mohammad Gamshad Zehi | Chah-e Nikabakht | Chah-e Nimeh | Chah-e Nokhud | Chah-e Nuk Bandak | Chah-e Nur Mohammad | Chah-e Osman | Chah-e Palli | Chah-e Pulad | Chah-e Qajar | Chah-e Qanbar | Chah-e Qanbarak | Chah-e Qezelbash | Chah-e Qorban | Chah-e Rahim | Chah-e Rahim | Chah-e Rahman | Chah-e Rahmat Allah | Chah-e Rahmat | Chah-e Rahmat | Chah-e Rasul | Chah-e Rasulbakhsh | Chah-e Rowghani | Chah-e Saadat | Chah-e Salar | Chah-e Sam | Chah-e Sangak | Chah-e Seyyed Mohammad | Chah-e Shabarvar | Chah-e Shahdad | Chah-e Shahi | Chah-e Shahi | Chah-e Shakar | Chah-e Sharif | Chah-e Sheh Dust | Chah-e Sheh Dust | Chah-e Sheykh Hasan | Chah-e Shir Khan | Chah-e Shir Mohammad Gorgich | Chah-e Shirvan | Chah-e Shur | Chah-e Shurak-e Do | Chah-e Shurak-e Yek | Chah-e Soltan Mohammad | Chah-e Soltan | Chah-e Taj Mohammad | Chah-e Taqi | Chah-e Torsh | Chah-e Vali Khan | Chah-e Vali Mohammad | Chah-e Vali Mohammad | Chah-e Yar Mohammad | Chah-e Yar Mohammad | Chah-e Yar Mohammad | Chah-e Yar Mohammad | Chah-e Yar Mohammad | Chahok | Chahr Khari | Chahtuk | Chahuk | Chahuk | Chahuk | Chahuk-e Mehrab | Chahuki | Chakal | Chaker Bazar | Chaker Zehi | Chakeri Koch | Chakkol | Chakol | Chakorabad | Chaluki | Chandukan | Chanf | Chang Anari | Charak | Charpadan | Charpanogan | Charti | Chat Kut Ansan | Chatandar | Chati-ye Pain | Chatuk | Chavar | Cheb | Chegerd | Chegerd | Chegerd | Chegerdak | Chegerdanlash | Cheh-e Zar | Chehel Kharvari | Chehel Mani | Chehmeh-ye Sorkh Mowtowr-e Hoseyni | Cheleng | Chelsat Ali | Chengiz Shir Zehi | Cheraghabad | Cheraghabad | Cheraghabad | Cheraghan | Cheshak | Cheshmak | Cheshmeh Bid | Cheshmeh Boland | Cheshmeh Maleki | Cheshmeh-ye Abek | Cheshmeh-ye Amir Amr | Cheshmeh-ye Juri | Cheshmeh-ye Khan Mohammad | Cheshmeh-ye Kondur | Cheshmeh-ye Salim | Chetander | Chideki | Chihaki | Chil Konar | Chil Sar | Chil Sar | Chil | Chiliban | Chorpan Shib | Chorrak | Chukaleki-ye Bala | Chukaleki-ye Pain | Chukat-e Abdol Karim Bazar | Chukat-e Bala | Chukat-e Pain | Chukat-e Vasat | Chury | Chutabad | Chutani

=== D ===
Dabbar | Dabshan | Dad Mohammad Abih | Dad Shah Mohammad Pahlavan | Dad Zari | Dadahi | Dadallah-e Bazar | Dadi | Dadkan | Dadkhodaabad | Dadkhoda-ye Sasuli | Dadollah | Dadrahman Badfar | Dadrahman Bazar | Dadrahman Bazar | Daf Hava | Daftulak | Dahan Baghi | Dahaneh | Dahaneh-ye Baghi | Dahirak | Dajdad-e Khoda | Dajdagaru | Dajdarig | Dajdelmorad | Dak Deh-e Mardeh | Dak Jamal | Dak | Dakab-e Rughan | Dakk-e Bahu | Dalushabad | Dambdaf | Dambdaf-e Miran | Dambdaf-e Moradi | Dambdaf-e Osman | Damen | Damikan | Damituk | Damitun-e Bala | Damitun-e Pain | Damui | Dan Dastkord | Dan Gisharatan | Dan Sar | Danb-e Sar | Dandarak | Daniar Kalak | Dansar Kaldan | Dansar | Danukan | Dap Gazan | Dap Kur | Dap Kur | Dapkur | Dar Ab | Dar Dazdan | Dar Giaban | Dar Giaban | Dar Nadan | Dar Narikan | Dar Ziraki | Darabul | Daragvar | Darahu | Darajendan | Darajindan | Darak | Darak | Darang Posht | Darang-e Eshaq | Darband | Darbandkan | Darbast | Darbon | Darchahi | Darduk | Darenan | Dargaz | Darhava | Daridar | Darin | Dark Karimabad | Darkan | Darkas | Dark-e Chandi | Darkeshan | Darkian | Darpan | Darreh Garm | Darreh Kashkin | Darreh-ye Palfateh Kharestan | Darreh-ye Seyeh Tapi | Darreh-ye Shargan | Darreh-ye Talayi | Darsan | Darsavaran | Dartaluk | Dartang | Darukan | Darvasak | Darvazuk Seyah Takan | Darvish | Dashak | Dasht Kuh-e Anjirak | Dasht Mal Hesaruiyeh Mowtowr-e Ali Zaboli | Dasht Mal Mahmud Naruyi | Dasht Mal Mowtowr-e Ahmad Naruyi | Dasht Mal Mowtowr-e Eydu Naruyi Pirdad | Dasht | Dashtak | Dashtak | Dashtak-e Mil-e Nader | Dashtandar | Dasht-e Emam | Dasht-e Zar | Dashtu | Dashtuk | Dashtuk | Dast Langin | Dastgerd | Dastgerd | Dastgerd | Dastkartaki | Davazdah Sahmi | Daz Darak | Dazandar | Dazandar | Dazank | Dazin Shib | Dazuki | Dazvanik | Dazy Chah | Deh Ali Akhund | Deh Bazi-ye Olya | Deh Bazi-ye Sofla | Deh Hoseyna | Deh Mir | Deh Nadam | Deh Now | Deh Now-e Ali Khan | Deh Qaleh | Deh Qola | Deh Shahdust | Dehak | Dehak-e Abdollah | Dehak-e-Seyyedabad | Dehan | Dehan | Dehan | Dehdati | Deh-e Abbas Aqa Jan | Deh-e Abdollah | Deh-e Afghan-e Bar Ahuyi | Deh-e Afsari | Deh-e Ahmad Ali Khan | Deh-e Ahmad | Deh-e Akhvond Gholami | Deh-e Alari | Deh-e Ali Ahmad-e Lek Zahi | Deh-e Ali Ahmad-e Lek Zayi | Deh-e Ali Akbar | Deh-e Ali Akbar-e Bala | Deh-e Ali Jan | Deh-e Ali Khan | Deh-e Ali Morad | Deh-e Ali Reza | Deh-e Alim | Deh-e Alishah | Deh-e Amir | Deh-e Anushirvan | Deh-e Aqa Jan | Deh-e Aqai | Deh-e Arbab | Deh-e Arbab | Deh-e Arjuni | Deh-e As | Deh-e Asghar | Deh-e Avaz | Deh-e Azad | Deh-e Azad | Deh-e Badil | Deh-e Bala Siyah Rishan | Deh-e Bala | Deh-e Bala | Deh-e Baluchi | Deh-e Bameri | Deh-e Bar Ahuyi | Deh-e Bashi | Deh-e Bashi | Deh-e Boland | Deh-e Bozi | Deh-e Buleh | Deh-e Chahar Dari | Deh-e Dah Mardeh | Deh-e Dargi | Deh-e Darvish | Deh-e Darvish Ali | Deh-e Dasht | Deh-e Delarami | Deh-e Deraz | Deh-e Ebrahim | Deh-e Emami | Deh-e Eskel | Deh-e Esmail Qanbar | Deh-e Fakhireh | Deh-e Fakhireh-ye Sofla | Deh-e Faqir | Deh-e Fatami | Deh-e Fathollah | Deh-e Gami | Deh-e Gargich | Deh-e Gat | Deh-e Ghafur | Deh-e Gholam Ali | Deh-e Gholam Mohammad Sarani | Deh-e Gholam Naruyi | Deh-e Gholaman | Deh-e Gholam-e Sharifabad | Deh-e Gol Mir | Deh-e Gol Mohammad | Deh-e Golzar | Deh-e Gorg | Deh-e Gorg | Deh-e Gorg | Deh-e Habil | Deh-e Hajji Abbas | Deh-e Hajji Abbas Khan | Deh-e Hajji Abdol Rahim Rakhshani | Deh-e Hajji Abdollah | Deh-e Hajji Hoseyn | Deh-e Hajji Hoseyn | Deh-e Hajji Mirza Khan | Deh-e Hajji Shahbaz | Deh-e Hasan Karbalai | Deh-e Hasan | Deh-e Hasan | Deh-e Hatam | Deh-e Hoseyn Ali Khan | Deh-e Hoseyn Mashhadi | Deh-e Hoseyn Rahman | Deh-e Hoseyn | Deh-e Isa-ye Olya | Deh-e Isa-ye Sofla | Deh-e Jafary | Deh-e Jamal ol Din | Deh-e Jangi Khun | Deh-e Jehil | Deh-e Jomeh | Deh-e Kadeh Feyzabad | Deh-e Kadkhoda Ali-ye Namruri | Deh-e Kadkhoda Shah Jan Bamari | Deh-e Kamali | Deh-e Kandal | Deh-e Karam Mazraeh | Deh-e Karam | Deh-e Karami | Deh-e Karim-e Deh-e Mardeheh | Deh-e Khamr | Deh-e Khiari | Deh-e Khoda Rahm | Deh-e Khodabakhsh | Deh-e Kikha | Deh-e Kul | Deh-e Kul | Deh-e Kul-e Eslam Nazer | Deh-e Lotfollah | Deh-e Mahenda | Deh-e Malang | Deh-e Mansuri | Deh-e Mardeh | Deh-e Mardeh | Deh-e Mardeh Sohrab | Deh-e Mardeh | Deh-e Mardeh | Deh-e Mardeh | Deh-e Mastikhun | Deh-e Mir Abdollah | Deh-e Mir Baluch | Deh-e Mir Beyk | Deh-e Mir Jafar Khan | Deh-e Mir Khan | Deh-e Mir Shah | Deh-e Mir | Deh-e Mir | Deh-e Miran | Deh-e Mirza Ali | Deh-e Mirza Khan-e Bar Ahuyi | Deh-e Mirza Mohammad | Deh-e Mirzang | Deh-e Mohammad Ali | Deh-e Mohammad Ebrahim | Deh-e Mohammad Mirza | Deh-e Mohammad Shahraki | Deh-e Mohsen | Deh-e Mokhtar | Deh-e Molla Abdollah | Deh-e Molla Ali | Deh-e Molla Nazar | Deh-e Molla | Deh-e Morad Ali | Deh-e Musa Ka Makhan | Deh-e Musa Mohammad | Deh-e Musa | Deh-e Nader | Deh-e Najib Gorgich | Deh-e Nazar Gargich | Deh-e Nazar Isa Zahi | Deh-e Nik Mohammad | Deh-e Nohur | Deh-e Now Jahan Tigh | Deh-e Now Piran | Deh-e Now | Deh-e Now | Deh-e Now | Deh-e Nur Mohammad Hormozi | Deh-e Nur Mohammad Khan | Deh-e Nur Mohammad Safarzayi | Deh-e Nur Mohammad-e Dashti | Deh-e Pabid | Deh-e Pahlavan | Deh-e Parkak | Deh-e Parviz Sarani | Deh-e Piri | Deh-e Qader | Deh-e Qasem Qajr | Deh-e Rahman | Deh-e Rais | Deh-e Rakhshani | Deh-e Rashid | Deh-e Rashid | Deh-e Rasul Khan Mohammad | Deh-e Rejai | Deh-e Reza Ali | Deh-e Reza | Deh-e Reza | Deh-e Reza | Deh-e Reza | Deh-e Rezayi | Deh-e Rostam Mahmud | Deh-e Rostam | Deh-e Rowshan | Deh-e Sadat | Deh-e Sadeq | Deh-e Safdar Mir Beyk | Deh-e Said | Deh-e Salim | Deh-e Samad | Deh-e Sand-e Gol | Deh-e Sangu | Deh-e Sargazi | Deh-e Sarhadi | Deh-e Shadi Jamal Zehi | Deh-e Shadi | Deh-e Shah Nazer | Deh-e Shahbaz | Deh-e Sherkat | Deh-e Sheykha | Deh-e Shirdel | Deh-e Soltan | Deh-e Taqi | Deh-e Validad | Deh-e Yadegar | Deh-e Yusef | Deh-e Zaman Khan | Deh-e Zeynal | Deh-e Ziarat-e Jahan Tigh | Deh-e Zir | Dehgandar | Dehi | Dehnow Posht-e Adimi | Dehnow | Dehnow-e Seyyed Khan | Dehu | Dejang-e Bala | Dejang-e Pain | Deji | Dekan Haniyan | Del Kuk | Del Morad | Delaram | Delegan-e Madrasah | Delegan-e Molla Faqir | Delegan-e Sheykh Cheragh | Delmorad Bazar | Delush Bazar | Dempak Bazar | Dengari | Densar Mowladad | Dep | Department of Agriculture | Derangu | Derap | Deraz | Dermanak | Deruk | Deruneh | Desk | Detk | Dez | Dezbon | Dezzak | Digru | Dimrud | Dirman | Dival | Divaneh | Divari | Dizi | Dizuk | Do Dar | Do Dar | Do Rahi Sad | Do Rudi | Do Rudi Narun | Do Shang | Don Garap | Don Qolman | Dorrabad | Dorudi | Dow Kalleh | Dowlatabad | Dowlatabad | Dowlatabad | Dowlatabad | Dowlatabad | Dowmaki | Dowr | Doz Bagan | Dukan Kopt | Duki | Dulabkan | Dumak | Dur | Durban-e Hajji Faqir | Durtum | Dushinkuh | Dust Mohammad | Dust Mohammad Bazar | Dust Mohammad Shah Karam | Dust Mohammad-e Lashkaran | Dust Mohammad-e Shah Gol Pahlavan | Dust-e Mohammad Hajji

=== E ===
Ebrahim Hut Bazar | Ebrahim Malek Dad | Ebrahimabad | Ebrahimabad | Ebrahimabad | Ebrahimabad | Ebrahimabad | Edipan | Eftekharabad | Emamabad | Emamabad | Emamabad | Emamabad | Emamiyeh | Emamiyeh-ye Pain | Enayat | Esfand | Esfandak | Eshaq Bazar | Eshaqabad | Eshaqabad | Eshkastag | Eshkastegan | Eshtarak Hajji Nazer | Eskan Dasht | Eskelabad | Eslamabad | Eslamabad | Eslamabad | Eslamabad | Eslamabad | Eslamabad | Eslamabad | Eslamabad | Eslamabad | Eslamabad | Eslamabad | Eslamabad | Eslamabad | Eslamabad | Eslamabad | Eslamabad | Eslamabad | Eslamabad | Eslamabad | Eslamabad | Eslamabad | Eslamabad | Eslamabad | Eslamabad | Eslamabad-e Garnechin | Eslamabad-e Mowtowr-e Abdol Vahdasheh Bakhsh | Eslamabad-e Pain | Eslamabad-e Qanat Shahbaz | Esmail Ali | Esmail Bazar Mahrek Jamik | Esmail Chat | Esmailabad | Esmailabad | Esmailabad | Esmailabad | Esmailabad | Esmailabad | Esmailabad | Esmailabad | Esmailabad | Esmailabad | Espah | Espakeh | Espekar | Espetk-e Hajji Gholam | Espid Bon | Espidabad | Espidak | Estahli | Estakhr | Estakhrak | Estakhru | Eydabad | Eydu Sohrab | Eyduabad

=== F ===
Fahreh | Fansan | Fanuj | Faqir Bazar | Faqir Lashkari | Faqir Qasem | Faqir Zehi Khan Mohammad Bazar | Faqir Zehi Morad Bazar | Faqir Zehi Nur Mohammad | Faqirabad | Faqirabad | Faqirabad-e Qanat Ebrahim | Farahi | Farm Complex | Faruqabad | Fath Ali Kalat | Fathabad | Fatuchah | Fazel Allahi | Feyzabad | Feyzabad | Feyzabad-e Luchu | Firuzabad | Firuzabad | Firuzabad | Firuzabad | Firuzabad | Firuzehi | Fiselabad

=== G ===
Gabulan | Gabulani | Gachi | Gadamak | Gadi Dap | Gadukan | Galah Chah | Galak | Galak-e Bala | Galik | Galindar | Galleh Bacheh | Galmurti | Galu Gah | Gamarduj-e Pain | Gamshad | Gamshadabad | Ganban | Gangozarabad | Ganjabad | Ganjabad | Ganjak | Ganush | Ganzi | Ganzuk | Gar Abdy | Gar Faqir | Gar Kandi Rasul Bakhsh Bazar | Gar Kandi | Gar Paskuh | Garab | Garagan | Garag-e Heydarabad | Garagheh-ye Pain | Garan | Garandarak | Garanshand | Garapan | Garbon | Gardak | Gardak | Gardak | Gargandar | Gargush | Gari Dasht Kuh | Garich | Garik | Garikan | Garikan | Garin Parag | Garisheh | Garjumak | Garm Bit-e Bala | Garm Bit-e Pain | Garmir-e Khadem | Garnak Darvazeh | Garowk | Garragi | Garsaman-e-Bala | Garshib | Gartupan | Gartut | Garudal-e Bala | Garuk Dap | Garuk Dap | Garuk | Garuk | Garukan | Garuki | Garuki | Gary | Gashan | Gat | Gat Rais Golestan | Gatan | Gatan | Gatan | Gati Ap | Gati Gur | Gati Task | Gati | Gati | Gativan | Gatti | Gavajag | Gavanak | Gavandalik Dap | Gavatamak | Gavatamak | Gavatamak | Gavataman | Gavatami | Gavatamin | Gavdal | Gavdari-ye Amiri | Gavdari-ye Sagari | Gavdary-ye Khan Mohammad Kabdani | Gavi | Gaz Anguri | Gaz Gar | Gaz Getan | Gaz Shahan | Gazab | Gazaki | Gazan Ashehi | Gazan Bazin | Gazan Tupan | Gazan | Gazan | Gazan | Gazan | Gazandan | Gazan-e Bala | Gazani-ye Pain | Gazani-ye Taj Mohammad | Gazar | Gazasiahu | Gazauz | Gazbastan | Gazchat | Gazdan | Gazdanak | Gazdanan | Gazdivan | Gazeh Shahnavazi | Gazeh-ye Gamshad Zehi | Gazger | Gazgun | Gazhak | Gazi Zehi | Gazidar | Gazikeh | Gazin Guhach | Gazin | Gazmanzel | Gazmeh | Gazmeh-ye Marishan | Gazmir | Gazmum | Gazok | Gazond | Gazrineg | Gazu | Gazuabad | Gazur | Geh Kuh | Geha | Gehjan | Gel Kan | Gelder | Geli | Genz | Genzerig | Geran | Geransekar | Geravani-ye Bala | Gerd Jangal | Gerd Jangal-e Qanat Dad Mohammad | Gerdahan | Gerdilash | Gerdovak | Gerdu Nan | Geri | Gesk-e Aliabad | Gesk-e Mohammadabad | Gesk-e Sarehabad | Gesk-e Shahiabad | Gespardin | Getanok | Getin Nukin | Ghafurabad | Gharib | Gharibabad | Gharibabad | Gharibabad | Gharibabad | Gharibabad | Gharibabad | Gharibabad | Gharibabad | Gharibabad | Gharibabad | Gharibabad | Gharibabad | Gharibabad | Gharibabad | Gharibabad | Gharibabad | Gharibabad | Gharibabad-e Allah Dad | Gharibabad-e Bala | Gharibabad-e Hajji Rahmat | Gharibabad-e Minuyi | Gharibabad-e Nark | Gharibabad-e Pain | Gharibabad-e Raduchahi | Gholam Ali Jafar | Gholam Ali Sargazi | Gholam Ali | Gholam Golzar | Gholam Mohammad Bazar | Gholam Mohammad Sarani | Gholam Mohammad | Gholam Nabi | Gholam Reza Nury | Gholam Rostam | Gholamak | Gholammohammad Bazar | Gholamuzamin | Gidbast | Gidbast | Gigan | Gimak | Giman | Giman | Giran | Gishan | Gishtan | Gishtary Dap | Gishterian | Gitan | Gitan | Gitani | Gitig | Gituk | Gobadhamun | Godamdar | Godar Gol | Gohram Kalat | Gol Gaz | Gol Gazabad | Gol Kan | Gol Kush | Gol Mir | Gol Mir | Gol Mirak | Gol Mohammad Beyk | Gol Mohammad | Gol Mohammad | Gol Pichuk | Gol Shir | Gol Shudan | Golabad | Golabad | Golabad-e Avval | Golabad-e Dum | Golbir | Golchah | Goldasht | Golkan-e Shahid Medani | Golkhani | Golshah | Golshah Naruyi | Golshahr | Golzarabad | Golzar-e Piri | Golzar-e Yagan | Gomn | Gonak | Gonbad Shahi | Gonbad-e Alavi | Gondow Bazar | Gonji | Gorban | Gorg | Gorg | Gorgich | Gorgukan | Gorgunak | Gorudal | Goruh | Gorvan | Gorz | Gosht | Govadeh | Govader Sham | Govahr-e Mili | Govajg | Govarai | Govarnag | Govarnag | Govarnag | Govarnak | Govash | Gow | Gow | Gow | Gowdan | Gowhar Kuh Shahrak | Gowhar | Gowmazi Faqir | Gowmazi Jari | Gowmazi Kowsar | Gowmazi Osman | Gowmazi Saleh | Gowmazi Sanjar | Gu | Guhech | Gumay | Gumdar | Gun Zemin | Gunak | Gunak | Gunak | Gundan | Gunefshgan | Gunegan | Gunich | Gunizhdar | Gunkan | Gur Band | Gur Kain | Gur Khalaj | Gur Mazar | Gur Mordan Tigh Ab | Gurabak | Gurabak | Guran Alit | Gurandi | Gurankesh-e Abd ol Rahman | Gurankesh-e Jamaat | Gurankesh-e Molla Goharam | Guranzhan Gaz | Gurband-e Avval | Gurband-e Dum | Gurband-e Sum | Gurchan | Gurchari | Gurd | Gurdar | Gurdim | Gurehi | Gurgar-e Jelayi | Gurgar-e Zeman Khan | Gurgatan | Guri | Guri | Guring | Guriyat | Gurkavan | Gurmurik | Gurnagan | Gurnagan | Gurnak | Gurnak | Gurshun | Gusal | Gushan-e Bala | Guvak Dap | Guvanak | Guvas

=== H ===
Habibabad | Habibabad | Habibehi | Hadarat | Hafezabad | Hafezabad | Haft Ardar | Haftari | Hajj Adam Bazar | Hajj Mohammad Alishah | Hajji Abbas Shahraki | Hajji Abbas | Hajji Abbas | Hajji Abdollah Bazar | Hajji Ahmad Shahvazayi | Hajji Akbar | Hajji Babakhan | Hajji Baluch Khan | Hajji Baran | Hajji Bazar | Hajji Began | Hajji Gholam Ali | Hajji Hoseyn Shahraki | Hajji Hoseyn Shirzehi | Hajji Karamabad | Hajji Khalil Sheh Bakhsh | Hajji Khoda Raham Rigi | Hajji Malang Kharut | Hajji Malek Shirzayi | Hajji Malek | Hajji Nabi | Hajji Nur Mohammad Bazar | Hajji Qaderdad Bazar | Hajji Rasul | Hajji Sabzan | Hajji Safar | Hajji | Hajjiabad | Hajjiabad | Hajjiabad | Hajjiabad | Hajjiabad | Hajjiabad | Hajjiabad | Hajjiabad | Hajjiabad | Hajjiabad | Hajjiabad | Hajjiabad | Hajjiabad | Hajjiabad | Hajjiabad | Hajjiabad | Hajjiabad | Hajjiabad | Hajjiabad | Hajjiabad-e Avval | Hajjiabad-e Dum | Hajjiabad-e Esmailabad | Hajjiabad-e Fajr | Hajjiabad-e Khezneh Golchat | Hajjiabad-e Khvoshdad | Hajjiabad-e Minuyi | Hajjiabad-e Pudchah | Hajjiabad-e Vazhdad | Hajuk | Hakim Rigi | Hakimabad | Halgodari-ye Ashraf | Halgodari-ye Osman | Halim Alizehi | Halim Khan | Halow Bazar | Hamadabad | Hamal Koshteh | Hamantak | Hambunan | Hamid Naruyi Farzand Ekhtar Mohammad | Hamidabad | Hamidabad | Hamidgu | Hamiri | Hamun Research Station | Hamzeh Jahan | Hamzehabad | Han | Hang | Hangiri | Hanif | Haniyan | Hansan | Hanziruk | Hanzom | Haqabad | Haqami | Haqqabad | Haqqabad | Hari Chahi | Hari | Haridowk | Harun Bazar | Hasan Abdollah | Hasan Jafar Zehi | Hasan Sheykh | Hasanabad | Hasanabad | Hasanabad | Hasanabad | Hasanabad | Hasanabad | Hasanabad | Hasanabad | Hasanabad | Hasanabad | Hasanabad | Hasanabad | Hasanabad-e Dastgerd | Hasanabad-e Kurin | Hasanabad-e Lankeh | Hasanabad-e Shandak | Hasanak | Hasankhun | Hashemabad | Hashemabad | Hashemzahi | Havaran | Havaran | Hedkan | Hemmatabad | Hemmatabad | Hemmatabad-e Shurchah | Hempani | Hendovan | Hendunehi | Herati | Hesagi | Hesaruiyeh Mowtowr-e Nazer Naruyi Ahmad | Hesharkeh | Heshik | Heydar Band | Heydarabad | Heydarabad | Heydarabad | Heydarabad | Heydarabad | Heydarabad | Heydarabad-e Soleyman | Heydari | Heydari | Hezari | Hezari | Hian | Hichan | Hidan | Hiduch-e Pain | Hiduj | Hiduyich | Hikan | Hir | Hirgan | Hisek | Hit | Hit | Hitak | Hitak | Hitamak | Hitan | Hitan | Hitgar | Hitkan | Hizabad-e Bala | Hizabad-e Pain | Hodar | Hojjatabad | Holunchekan | Hormak | Hormiri | Hormozi | Hoseyn Ali Mastian | Hoseyn Arbabi | Hoseyn Baqer | Hoseyn Bazar | Hoseyn Bazar | Hoseyn Bazar | Hoseyn Masafer | Hoseyn Mir Ali | Hoseyn Mirdel | Hoseyn ol Tafali Safar | Hoseyn Safdar | Hoseyn Shahraki | Hoseyn Zehi | Hoseyn Zinal | Hoseyna | Hoseynabad | Hoseynabad | Hoseynabad | Hoseynabad | Hoseynabad | Hoseynabad | Hoseynabad Ladi | Hoseynabad | Hoseynabad | Hoseynabad | Hoseynabad | Hoseynabad | Hoseynabad | Hoseynabad | Hoseynabad | Hoseynabad | Hoseynabad | Hoseynabad | Hoseynabad | Hoseynabad | Hoseynabad-e Bagh-e Nil | Hoseynabad-e Bazy | Hoseynabad-e Chah Rahman | Hoseynabad-e Felfeli | Hoseynabad-e Gaz Shahan | Hoseynabad-e Jar | Hoseynabad-e Khvajeh | Hoseynabad-e Mir Shah | Hoseynabad-e Nilgun | Hoseynabad-e Pudchah | Hoseynabad-e Qanat | Hoseynabad-e Sofla | Hoseynabadi | Hoseyn-e Nur Mohammad | Hoshani | Hudian | Hulmadian-e Bala | Hulmadian-e Pain | Humadan | Hunak | Huraki | Hushab Aluk | Hushak | Hushapi | Hushom | Hut Gat Jahli | Hutabad | Hutabad | Hutabad | Hutak | Hut-e Amr

=== I ===
Iduabad | Industrial Estate | Industrial Estate | Industrial Estate | Irafshan | Iranran | Iranshahr | Iranshahr Industrial Complex | Isa Bazar | Isa Faqir | Isa Piri | Isaabad | Isaabad | Isaabad | Itk

=== J ===
Jabbar Kuteh | Jabbar | Jabrabad | Jadidabad-e Shandak | Jadu Zehi Buhir | Jadu Zehi Hajji Piri | Jagan | Jagur | Jah Morgh | Jahadabad | Jahan Girak | Jahan Tigh | Jahan Tigh | Jahanabad-e Olya | Jahanabad-e Sofla | Jahanbakhsh | Jahangir | Jahlin | Jahlishahr | Jahliyan | Jaht Kallag | Jaik | Jak Sukhteh | Jakan | Jakan | Jakan | Jakandar | Jakas | Jakbonan | Jakdan | Jaki | Jakigur | Jakigur Proving Grounds | Jalai Kalag | Jalalabad | Jalalabad | Jalalabad | Jalalabad | Jalalabad | Jalalabad | Jalalabad | Jalali | Jaleq | Jam Pali | Jama Azam | Jama Zehi | Jama Zehi Kuh Dim | Jama | Jamaabad | Jamaabad-e Hajji Nur Mohammad | Jamaat Zehi | Jamak Zehi | Jamakabad | Jamakan | Jamalabad | Jamam | Jamaski | Jamchin | Jamia Ni Bazar | Jamidar | Jamidar | Jamkan | Jamuk | Jan Ali | Jan Bibi | Jan Mohammad Chahi | Jan Mohammad | Jan Parur | Janabad | Janabad | Janabad | Janak Buk | Jandu | Jangal Baghi | Jangal | Jangal | Jangal | Jangal-e Mukan | Jangaluk | Jangaran | Jangarek-e Bala | Jangarek-e Pain | Jangikhu | Janguneh | Jani Golzar | Jani | Janmohammad Bazar | Januk | Jarikeh | Jaruk | Jaruk-e Pain | Jash | Jashtekan-e Bala | Jashtekan-e Pain | Javadabad | Javan Chah | Javan Danan | Javan Kan | Javanja | Javshir | Jazink | Jekuki | Jelalyi Lankeh | Jeyhunak-e Bala | Jeyhunak-e Pain | Ji Sorkh-e Olya | Jiguli | Jish Kabirabad | Jod | Jodegalabad | Jogan Patak | Joghranvaru | Johli Shahryanach | Johlu | Jolgeh Anjerak | Jomabazar | Jomabazar | Jomeyli | Jor | Jowgaz-e Bala | Jowgaz-e Pain | Jowkan | Jowz Dar | Jowzdar | Judin | Jugin | Juhani | Juhani | Juli-ye Bala-ye Kalateh-ye Hoseyn Khan | Junabad | Junazi | Juran Kuram | Jurani | Juri | Juydad Mohammad | Juyik

=== K ===
Kablan | Kach Kurin | Kach | Kachal | Kachdar | Kacheh Rud | Kachian | Kachki | Kachkul | Kachu | Kad | Kad Eshkaft | Kadarm | Kadkhoda Hoseyn | Kadkhoda Safar | Kadu Bazar | Kafeh Hajjiabad | Kafeh Jangian | Kafeh-ye Khalil | Kaftaregi | Kah Gishan | Kahanok | Kahanok | Kahir | Kahir Dari | Kahir-e Borz-e Bala | Kahir-e Borz-e Pain | Kahiri | Kahiri | Kahiri | Kahn Rahim | Kahn Sakan | Kahnab | Kahnak | Kahnak | Kahnak | Kahnak | Kahnak | Kahnak-e Mohammadi | Kahnan Kash-e Bala | Kahnani | Kahnanikash | Kahn-e Ali Mohammad | Kahn-e Bala | Kahn-e Emam Bibi Surap | Kahn-e Fahreh | Kahn-e Hoseyn-e Pain | Kahn-e Jan Mohammad | Kahn-e Kahur | Kahn-e Karam Shah | Kahn-e Karamshah | Kahn-e Karim | Kahn-e Karim Bakhsh | Kahn-e Kuchan | Kahn-e Magar | Kahn-e Malek | Kahn-e Mir Baluch | Kahn-e Molla | Kahn-e Molla | Kahn-e Nuk | Kahn-e Pain | Kahn-e Rasul Bakhsh | Kahn-e Rudir | Kahn-e Seyyed Mohammad Bakhti | Kahn-e Shah Morad | Kahn-e Shah Salim | Kahn-e Shanbeh | Kahnog | Kahnok Ladi | Kahnok | Kahnok-e Mirabad | Kahnok-e Shirabad | Kahnu | Kahnuk | Kahruk | Kahuk | Kahur Bolbol | Kahurak | Kahurak | Kahurakan | Kahuran Dap | Kahurani Gevash | Kaj Kush | Kaj | Kajui | Kakha | Kaki | Kaktel Daranj | Kakuj | Kal Chat | Kal Kang | Kal Kut | Kal Shab Ravan | Kal Titeran | Kalag | Kalak Dinar | Kalak Shiman | Kalak | Kalak-e Bala | Kalakontak | Kalan | Kalan Kurd | Kalan | Kalan | Kalani | Kalanzohur | Kalat | Kalatak | Kalatak | Kalat-e Bala | Kalat-e Hajji Nur Mohammad Brahuyi | Kalat-e Jahal | Kalat-e Sofla | Kalateh | Kalateh | Kalateh-ye Kambuzia | Kalateh-ye Omar | Kalateh-ye Razzaqzadeh | Kalateh-ye Sohrab | Kalatin Dap | Kalber | Kalchat | Kalchat | Kalchat | Kalchat | Kalchat-e Heydarabad | Kalchati | Kalchatuk | Kaldan | Kaldanak | Kali Allahabad | Kali Bak Konar | Kali Begar | Kali Tak | Kali | Kaliran | Kaliri | Kaliri | Kaljegan | Kalkali | Kalkali-ye Now | Kallag Gili | Kallag Jamal | Kallag Palang | Kallag Qalandar | Kallag | Kallah Gur | Kallah Mashkid | Kallah Sakan | Kallak Abdu | Kallak Hamud | Kallak Sabzali | Kallakqasem | Kallani | Kalleh Bali | Kalleh Char | Kalleh Chat | Kalleh Din | Kalleh Gan | Kalleh Garmak | Kalleh Giri | Kalleh Gish | Kalleh Guk | Kalleh Guk | Kalleh Huk | Kalleh Huk | Kalleh Jameh | Kalleh Kaz | Kalleh Korq | Kalleh Maran | Kalleh Pahlavan | Kalleh Sakan | Kalleh Sari | Kalleh Shahtut | Kalleh Shahu | Kalleh Sohran | Kalleh-ye Espid | Kalleh-ye Espid-e Eslamabad | Kalleh-ye Shurehi | Kallik | Kallinag-e Hasankhani | Kalmat | Kalpuregan | Kalubarap | Kalukan | Kalukhi | Kaluki | Kalutan | Kaluyi | Kam Kaseh | Kam Khan | Kam Shahr | Kam Zard | Kamalabad | Kamalabad | Kamalabad | Kamalabad | Kamani | Kamardan-e Pain | Kambar-e Baqer | Kambel Balad | Kambel Dal Morad | Kambel Karim Bakhsh | Kambel Mohammad Azim | Kambel-e Soleyman | Kambik Dap | Kambil | Kam-e Zard | Kaminak | Kamkhan | Kammak | Kamsegari | Kamshahr | Kamu Bazar | Kan | Kanal | Kandarak | Kandarban | Kand-e Gazi | Kand-e Zard | Kandez | Kandikeh | Kandu | Kandy | Kangari Chah Allahdad | Kang-e Emam Dad | Kang-e Molla Abdollah | Kang-e Piran | Kang-e Shir Ali Khan | Kanigan | Kankowr | Kant | Kantak Sari | Kantani | Kapak | Kaparan Dan | Kaputi | Kar Gin | Karagi | Karagi-ye Bala | Karagi-ye Pain | Karam Bal-e Bakhshi | Karam Bal-e Faqir | Karam Bal-e Khodadad | Karam Bal-e Ramazan | Karam Beyk-e Rowghani | Karamabad | Karan Kesh | Karani | Karaq-e Shah Jahan | Karash | Karbalai Abbas | Karbalai Ali | Karbalai Gholam | Karbalai Hasan | Karbalai Hasan | Karbalai Hoseyn | Karbalai Musa Khemri | Karbalai Qorban | Karbalai Shahbaz | Karbalayi Heydar | Karbasak | Karbasi | Karbasu | Karchan | Karchan | Karegi | Karguk | Karim | Karim Koshteh | Karim Naruyi Kingi | Karim Shah Nazer | Karimabad | Karimabad | Karimabad | Karimabad | Karimabad | Karimabad | Karimabad | Karimabad | Karimabad | Karimabad | Karimabad | Karimabad | Karimabad | Karimabad | Karimabad | Karimabad | Karimabad | Karimabad | Karimabad | Karimabad | Karimabad | Karimabad-e Deh Tajgi | Karimabad-e Dumak | Karimabad-e Hajji Karim | Karimabad-e Kheybar | Karimabad-e Minuyi | Karimabad-e Nukchah | Karimabad-e Seyyed Ali Khamenehi | Karimabad-e Zarchah | Karkuh | Karkum | Karpasi | Karpedin | Kartakan Shib | Kartakeh | Karuchan | Karuchi Dar | Karuchi | Karuchi | Karudan | Karuji | Karuki | Karuz Dap | Karuz Gilaki | Karuz | Karvandar | Karvandar | Kas Mazur | Kasab | Kasag | Kasami | Kasap Dasht Kuh | Kashak | Kashanuk | Kashen | Kashgai | Kashi | Kashik | Kashiki-ye Pain | Kashk | Kashkan | Kashtag-e Dastgerd | Kasiri Dap | Kasirtalag | Kaskin | Kasur-e Bala | Kasur-e Pain | Kasuri | Kasuri | Kasury | Katagar | Katamak | Katamak | Katbon | Katibi | Katichan | Katinkan-e Bala | Katukan | Katukan | Katukdan | Katuran-e Olya | Kavanz | Kavari | Kazvar Dap | Kek Nuk | Kekdan | Keki | Kelinkan | Kelinukan | Kelk | Kerahmat | Kerai Kur | Kermanchi | Kerstan | Kesh Kurdof | Keshari | Keshik | Keshikan | Keshmak | Keshok | Keshtegan | Keskan | Keydun | Keykha | Keykha Rasul | Khak-e Sefidi | Khalband | Khaleq Dad | Khalijabad | Khalilabad | Khalilabad | Khalilabad | Khalilabad | Khamak | Khamak | Khan Bibi | Khan Mohammad Chah | Khan Mohammad Salar Zehi | Khan Mohammad | Khanak | Khaneh Hay Ali Jafar-e Olya | Khaneh Hay Chahar Shanbeh | Khaneh Hay Hajji Dadollah | Khaneh Hay Hajji Khoda Bakhsh | Khaneh Hay Jan Mohammad | Khaneh Hay Khoda Bakhsh | Khaneh Hay Khodadad | Khaneh Hay Khodadad Atash Behar | Khaneh Hay Mehrollah | Khaneh Hay Mului | Khaneh Hay Nazer Saheb Khan | Khaneh Hay Rudbari | Khaneh Hay Saliman | Khaneh Hay Samad | Khaneh-ye Hay Khvasti | Khani Abbas | Khani Gol Mohammad Rakhshani | Kharabeh Shir Mohammad | Kharabeh | Kharaki | Kharbard | Kharestan-e Bala | Kharestan-e Pain | Khash Garrison | Khash | Khaz Pari | Khaz-e Bahari | Khazun | Khedri | Khedry | Kheyrabad | Kheyrabad | Kheyrabad | Kheyrabad | Kheyrabad | Kheyrabad | Kheyrabad | Kheyrabad | Kheyrabad | Kheyrabad | Kheyrabad | Kheyrabad | Kheyrabad | Kheyrabad | Kheyrabad-e Bala | Kheyrabad-e Barqi | Kheyrabad-e Maraku | Kheyrabad-e Padagi Mowtowr-e Sahebdad Nuti Zehi | Kheyrabad-e Pain | Kheyrabad-e Palagi | Kheyrokabad | Khoda Bakhsh Jadegal Tukani | Khoda Raham | Khoda Suli | Khodaabad | Khodaabad | Khodaabad | Khodaabad | Khodabakhsh Jadegal | Khorashadi | Khorashadi | Khoshki Dar | Khosrowabad | Khosrowabad | Khuki | Khushnag | Khvajeh Ahmad | Khvajeh Mahmudi | Khvajeh Mehrban | Khvajeh Mesk | Khvastiabad | Khvosh Ab | Khvoshab | Khvoshab | Khvoshab | Khvoshab-e Anjerak | Khvoshdad-e Jadid | Kiaabad-e Padagi | Kijgadar Dap | Kiki | Kiki | Kiksuch | Kishkallak | Kitanban | Kitegi | Koch | Koch | Koch | Koch-e Garg | Koch-e Yusof | Kodan | Kohak | Kohan Nuk | Kohnan Kurdan | Kohn-e Isa | Kojum | Kol Hamin | Kolangur | Kolarai | Koldan | Kolgi Kesh | Kollan | Kollanzeh | Kolli | Kolluk | Koluki | Komb-e Moradabad | Kombil | Konar | Konar Bast | Konar Komban | Konar Shib | Konarak Industrial Estate | Konarak | Konarak | Konaran | Konardan | Konardan | Konar-e Dar | Konari | Konari | Kondel | Kordeskiyan | Korki | Koruchi-ye Bala | Koruchi-ye Pain | Koshkuk | Koshohk | Kotij | Kozur | Kuanz | Kucheh | Kuchinak | Kuchu | Kudaki | Kud-e Now | Kug | Kuh Dim-e Bala | Kuh Dim-e Pain | Kuh Kanar | Kuh Khezr | Kuh Matig | Kuh Ruk | Kuhak | Kuhakam | Kuhan Sotat | Kuhbon | Kuh-e Nurk | Kuh-e Pasan | Kuh-e Piza | Kuh-e Sefid | Kuh-e Tanjilan | Kuhi Sar | Kuhiabad | Kuhigan-e Bala | Kuhigan-e Pain | Kuhkan | Kulak | Kulaku | Kulikan | Kulu | Kupak | Kupch | Kupehi | Kur Nahut | Kuran | Kuran-e Olya | Kuran-e Sofla | Kurang | Kur-e Kelkian | Kureh Ajar Fashari Sepah | Kureh Ajarpazi | Kureh Hay Shahid Beheshti | Kureh-ye Bi Barg Khan | Kureh-ye Chah Bakhsh Dar | Kureh-ye Chengiz | Kureh-ye Hajji Karim | Kureh-ye Hajji Mohammad | Kureh-ye Hajji Sahebdad | Kureh-ye Pir Mohammad Sheh Baksh | Kurgazi | Kuri | Kurkaj | Kursar | Kuruch | Kurziarat | Kush | Kushan-e Bala | Kushan-e Pain | Kushat-e Dum | Kushat-e Owl | Kushat-e Sum | Kusheh | Kusheh-ye Gardak | Kusheh-ye Olya | Kusheh-ye Pain | Kusheh-ye Qaleh Rashid Khan | Kushhok | Kushk | Kusichi | Kusichi-ye Bala | Kusiji | Kuteh | Kutiru | Kuy Patkuk Dasht Kuh | Kuyichu

=== L ===
Ladiz-e Olya | Ladiz-e Sofla | Ladkhukan | Laghar Zehi | Laghari Charpan | Lagharkuh | Lagurtal | Lahabad | Lahrab-e Alanjan | Lahrab-e Andeh | Lahremba | Lajehi | Laki | Lakki | Laku Kach | Lal Khan | Lalabad | Lalabad-e Huti | Lalu Bazar | Lalu Bazar | Lanbar | Langar Barani | Langar Konaran | Langaru | Laniyari | Lardi | Lar-e Bala | Lar-e Pain | Lash | Lashar Gahi | Lashkeran | Latfi | Lati Dan | Lavari Ab | Lechvi | Leji | Li Khaki | Lisabad | Loqman | Lulakdan | Lurgbagh | Luri Rud | Luri Shah | Luriyani | Lutak | Lutak-e Hajji Azim | Lutak-e Rahim Khan | Lutak-e Safar Shah | Lutak-e Shir Mohammad

=== M ===
Mach Kur | Mach Mitak | Machan | Machguash | Machik | Machu Qasem | Madan Chah | Madan Shen | Madanch | Madan-e Sang Chah Torsh | Madeh Kariz | Madhan | Madhan | Maduhak | Magdar | Magun | Mahand | Mahani | Mahban | Mahbetabad | Mahmudabad | Mahmudabad | Mahmudabad | Mahmudabad | Mahmudabad | Mahmudabad | Mahmudabad | Mahmudabad | Mahmudabad-e Garvas Bakam | Mahmudi-ye Bala | Majid Isa Zahi | Majid | Majidabad | Makaki | Makdan | Makhezan Ab | Maki | Maksan | Makul | Malang-e Jama | Malek Heydari | Malek Mohammadabad | Malekabad | Malekabad | Malekabad | Malekabad | Malekabad | Malekabad | Malekabad | Malekabad | Malekabad | Malekabad | Malekabad | Malekabad | Malekabad | Malekabad | Malekabad | Malekabad | Malekabad | Malekabad | Malekabad-e Minuyi | Malekabad-e Shandak | Maleki | Maluran | Mamakikomb | Mami | Manargan | Mand-e Bala | Mand-e Sofla | Mandilabad | Mandilan-e Bala | Mandirow | Mandiru | Mandustabad | Maneh-ye Pain | Manesh | Manikuk | Manjin | Mansurabad | Mansurabad | Mantan | Mantaqeh Azad Chabahar | Mantaqeh-ye Lad | Manzelab | Manzuri | Marabad | Marah Hoseynabad | Maraku | Marandegan | Mareghan Kand | Margan | Margi Dap | Marguk | Marishan | Markan | Marungaz | Masafar Kalati | Masafer | Mashay-e Dasht Kalla Chat | Masha-ye Mokran | Masha-ye Seyahabad | Masha-ye Seyyed Mohammad Rigi | Masha-ye Shahid Abbaspur | Mashhady Gholam Ali Qanbar Ali | Mashi | Mashin | Mashkutak | Mashnak | Masiti Masjedi | Masjed Abu ol Fazl | Maskang | Maskutan | Maskutan | Matkan | Matkan Dap | Maydar | Mazakan | Mazan Pad | Mazan Zamin | Mazeh Sar | Mazraeh-ye Abdol Vahad | Mazraeh-ye Amuzeshi Danshgah | Mazraeh-ye Anu Shirvan | Mazraeh-ye Baqerabad | Mazraeh-ye Barani | Mazraeh-ye Began | Mazraeh-ye Dashtuk | Mazraeh-ye Ebrahim | Mazraeh-ye Hishurki | Mazraeh-ye Jan Mohammad | Mazraeh-ye Jangal | Mazraeh-ye Khakaran | Mazraeh-ye Malkuri | Mazraeh-ye Mohammad Khoda Bakhsh | Mazraeh-ye Sarrud | Mazraeh-ye Sorkh Gazi | Meh Abdollah | Mehdiabad | Mehdiabad-e Gaz Mohrab Khan | Mehmehdabad-e Heymagi | Mehrab Bazar | Mehrababad | Mehrababad | Mehrabad | Mehrabad | Mehran | Menab Ab | Mendar | Meskin | Meteseng | Metri | Meydan | Meydan-e Sorkh | Meydanjah | Mian Chah | Mianbazar | Mianshahr | Mihan | Mijuni | Milak | Milman | Mim Khan | Min | Minab | Minan | Minan | Mir Dak | Mir Gol | Mir Gol-e Kalati | Mir Kuh-e Bala | Mir Kuh-e Pain | Mir Shekar | Mir Zamin | Mirabad | Mirabad | Mirabad | Mirabad | Mirabad | Mirabad | Mirabad | Mirabad | Mirabad | Mirabad | Mirabad | Mirch | Mirinabad | Mirjaveh | Mirkhan-e Shah Gol | Mirtalag | Mirza Chahi | Mirza Nabi | Mirzaabad | Mirzaabad | Mirzaabad | Mirzaabad | Mirzakhun | Mishud | Mishud | Miski | Mitagan | Mobaraki Agricultural Farm | Moddabad-e Lankeh | Mogh | Moghan Shabu | Mohammad Azam | Mohammad Baluchi | Mohammad Dadi | Mohammad Hasan | Mohammad Hoseyn Barani | Mohammad Jahangir | Mohammad Jan | Mohammad Khan | Mohammad Khvoshdad | Mohammad Qasem | Mohammad Rakhshani | Mohammad Safar | Mohammad Shah Karam Residential Complex | Mohammad Zehi | Mohammadabad | Mohammadabad | Mohammadabad | Mohammadabad | Mohammadabad | Mohammadabad | Mohammadabad | Mohammadabad | Mohammadabad | Mohammadabad | Mohammadabad | Mohammadabad | Mohammadabad | Mohammadabad | Mohammadabad | Mohammadabad | Mohammadabad | Mohammadabad | Mohammadabad | Mohammadabad | Mohammadabad | Mohammadabad | Mohammadabad | Mohammadabad | Mohammadabad | Mohammadabad | Mohammadabad | Mohammadabad | Mohammadabad-e Adimi | Mohammadabad-e Andeh | Mohammadabad-e Cheshmeh | Mohammadabad-e Janguneh | Mohammadabad-e Kurin | Mohammadabad-e Lankeh | Mohammadabad-e Lurgbagh | Mohammadabad-e Padgan | Mohammadabad-e Pain | Mohammadabad-e Pain Talarak | Mohammadabad-e Pudchah | Mohammadabad-e Pudchah | Mohammadabad-e Qanat Shah Mohammad | Mohammadabad-e Rowghani | Mohammadabad-e Shah Nur | Mohammadabad-e Suran | Mohammadabad-e Tasab | Mohammadi | Mohammadi | Moharbi | Mohimabad | Mohrab Bazar | Mohsenabad | Mohtaramabad | Mojtame-ye Mowtowr-e Hay Tigh Ab | Mok Sukhteh | Mokan Shahi | Mokht | Molla Ali | Molla Avaz | Molla Azim Rudini | Molla Dadi | Molla Dadkhoda Isa Zehi | Molla Dust Mohammad | Molla Ebrahim | Molla Ebrahim | Molla Gol Jan | Molla Karim-e Bar Ahui | Molla Mohammad | Molla Nur Mohammad | Molla Qasem | Molla Qus | Molla Reza | Molla Soltan | Mollaabad | Moluk Bazar | Morad Ali | Morad Ali | Morad Bazar | Morad Hibatan Bazar | Morad Mohammad Bazar | Morad Mohammad Bazar | Morad Qoli | Moradabad | Moradabad | Moradabad | Moradabad | Moradabad-e Gimi | Moradabad-e Juzh | Moradi Kashk | Mordan Heydari | Morid Bazar | Moridarow-e Bala | Moridarow-e Pain | Mortegan | Mosafer Zehi | Mosharqi Jamalabad | Moshkadim | Moshkunt | Mowd-e Geli | Mowla Bakhsh Bazar | Mowlaabad | Mowladad Zehi | Mowlowy-ye Dust Mohammad | Mowmenabad | Mowtowr Shomareh-ye 202 | Mowtowr Shomareh-ye 210 | Mowtowr Shomareh-ye 212 | Mowtowr Shomareh-ye 37 | Mowtowr Shomareh-ye 39 | Mowtowr Shomareh-ye 40 | Mowtowr Shomareh-ye 41 | Mowtowr Shomareh-ye 5 | Mowtowr Shomareh-ye Yek | Mowtowr-e 15 Khordad | Mowtowr-e 22 Bahman | Mowtowr-e 231 | Mowtowr-e 8 Shahrivar | Mowtowr-e 9 Morad Gam Dad Rigi | Mowtowr-e Ab Faqirdad Jadgal | Mowtowr-e Ab Miran Jadgal | Mowtowr-e Ab Rostam Abir | Mowtowr-e Ab Yaqub Amiry | Mowtowr-e Abbas | Mowtowr-e Abbas Qanbar Zehi | Mowtowr-e Abdal | Mowtowr-e Abdal Naruyi | Mowtowr-e Abdal Rahman Naruyi | Mowtowr-e Abdel | Mowtowr-e Abdol Aziz | Mowtowr-e Abdol Aziz | Mowtowr-e Abdol Ghafur | Mowtowr-e Abdol Ghafur Naruyi | Mowtowr-e Abdol Ghani Bahader | Mowtowr-e Abdol Hakim | Mowtowr-e Abdol Hamid | Mowtowr-e Abdol Haqq | Mowtowr-e Abdol Hasan | Mowtowr-e Abdol Karim | Mowtowr-e Abdol Karim | Mowtowr-e Abdol Karim | Mowtowr-e Abdol Karim | Mowtowr-e Abdol Khalil | Mowtowr-e Abdol Majid | Mowtowr-e Abdol Nabi | Mowtowr-e Abdol Nabi | Mowtowr-e Abdol Nabi | Mowtowr-e Abdol Naser Kelekeli | Mowtowr-e Abdol Qader | Mowtowr-e Abdol Qader | Mowtowr-e Abdol Qeyum | Mowtowr-e Abdol Qeyum Rigi | Mowtowr-e Abdol Rahim | Mowtowr-e Abdol Rahim | Mowtowr-e Abdol Rahman | Mowtowr-e Abdol Rahman | Mowtowr-e Abdol Rahman | Mowtowr-e Abdol Rahman | Mowtowr-e Abdol Rahman Darfasheh | Mowtowr-e Abdol Rahman Dasht Mal | Mowtowr-e Abdol Rahman Nuk Bandak | Mowtowr-e Abdol Rahman | Mowtowr-e Abdol Salam | Mowtowr-e Abdol Salam | Mowtowr-e Abdol Salam Feyz Mohammad | Mowtowr-e Abdol Salam Rudini | Mowtowr-e Abdol Vahad | Mowtowr-e Abdol Vahad | Mowtowr-e Abdol Vahad | Mowtowr-e Abdol Vahad Pak Tuta Zehi | Mowtowr-e Abdol Vahad | Mowtowr-e Abdol Vahad | Mowtowr-e Abdollah | Mowtowr-e Abdollah | Mowtowr-e Abdollah Naruyi | Mowtowr-e Abdollahi Rad | Mowtowr-e Ahmad Azizi | Mowtowr-e Ahmad Mazari | Mowtowr-e Ahmad Nayib | Mowtowr-e Ahmad Pirasteh | Mowtowr-e Ahmad | Mowtowr-e Ahmad | Mowtowr-e Akbar | Mowtowr-e Akbar | Mowtowr-e Akbar Vasheh Nazer | Mowtowr-e Akbar | Mowtowr-e Alam | Mowtowr-e Alam Beyk | Mowtowr-e Alam Khan Sheh Bakhsh | Mowtowr-e Ali Jan Baqeri | Mowtowr-e Ali Kord | Mowtowr-e Ali Qasem | Mowtowr-e Ali Rigi | Mowtowr-e Ali Shah | Mowtowr-e Ali Shir | Mowtowr-e Ali Zehi | Mowtowr-e Alim | Mowtowr-e Alizadeh | Mowtowr-e Allah Bakhsh Hatam | Mowtowr-e Allah Bakhsh Qanbar Zehi | Mowtowr-e Allah Bakhsh Sheh Bakhsh | Mowtowr-e Allah Bakhsh | Mowtowr-e Allah Bakhsh | Mowtowr-e Allah Nazer | Mowtowr-e Allah Nazer | Mowtowr-e Allah Resan | Mowtowr-e Allah Yar | Mowtowr-e Allah Yar | Mowtowr-e Allahabad | Mowtowr-e Ameneh | Mowtowr-e Amid | Mowtowr-e Amir | Mowtowr-e Amir Brahui | Mowtowr-e Amir Naruyi | Mowtowr-e Amirabad | Mowtowr-e Amr | Mowtowr-e Amr | Mowtowr-e Amr | Mowtowr-e Amr | Mowtowr-e Amr Shah | Mowtowr-e Anur | Mowtowr-e Anushirvan Guni | Mowtowr-e Arbabi | Mowtowr-e Asa | Mowtowr-e Asa | Mowtowr-e Asa | Mowtowr-e Asad | Mowtowr-e Ata Allah | Mowtowr-e Aysar | Mowtowr-e Ayyub Borhan Zehi | Mowtowr-e Azim Parest | Mowtowr-e Badi ol Zeman | Mowtowr-e Bagh-e Baghun | Mowtowr-e Bahader Qanbar Zehi | Mowtowr-e Bahader | Mowtowr-e Bahader | Mowtowr-e Bahader | Mowtowr-e Bahram Nuti Zehi | Mowtowr-e Bahrami | Mowtowr-e Bajar | Mowtowr-e Balach | Mowtowr-e Baluch | Mowtowr-e Baluch Khan | Mowtowr-e Baluch Khan | Mowtowr-e Baluch Khan | Mowtowr-e Baluch Khan | Mowtowr-e Baluch Mohammad Jadgal | Mowtowr-e Barnayan | Mowtowr-e Barqi | Mowtowr-e Bayigan | Mowtowr-e Baz Mohammad | Mowtowr-e Beha ol Din | Mowtowr-e Behay ol Din | Mowtowr-e Behruz | Mowtowr-e Bejar | Mowtowr-e Beyt ol Maqades | Mowtowr-e Bi Borg | Mowtowr-e Bi Borg | Mowtowr-e Bibi Meh Shahsevar | Mowtowr-e Bigam | Mowtowr-e Bijar | Mowtowr-e Bijar | Mowtowr-e Bijar | Mowtowr-e Bijar | Mowtowr-e Bonadi | Mowtowr-e Boniyad | Mowtowr-e Bulan Zehi Kach | Mowtowr-e Chaker | Mowtowr-e Chamal Naruyi | Mowtowr-e Chengiz | Mowtowr-e Chengiz | Mowtowr-e Chengiz Jangiyan | Mowtowr-e Chengiz | Mowtowr-e Chengiz | Mowtowr-e Cheragh | Mowtowr-e Cheragh | Mowtowr-e Cheragh Ali | Mowtowr-e Cheragh | Mowtowr-e Dad Karim | Mowtowr-e Dad Khoda | Mowtowr-e Dad Khoda Kamiab | Mowtowr-e Dad Mohammad Jadgal | Mowtowr-e Dad Mohammad Rahbar | Mowtowr-e Dadshah | Mowtowr-e Dar Khan | Mowtowr-e Dar Khatun | Mowtowr-e Dar Khatun | Mowtowr-e Dar Mohammad | Mowtowr-e Dar Mohammad | Mowtowr-e Dar Mohammad | Mowtowr-e Dar Mohammad | Mowtowr-e Dar Mohammad | Mowtowr-e Dar Mohammad Gamshad Zehi | Mowtowr-e Dar Mohammad Jamshid Zehi | Mowtowr-e Dar Mohammad Janab Dasht Mahal | Mowtowr-e Dar Mohammad | Mowtowr-e Davazdah Bahman | Mowtowr-e Davazdah Farurdin | Mowtowr-e Del Morad | Mowtowr-e Delmorad | Mowtowr-e Din Mohammad | Mowtowr-e Doktor Spahi | Mowtowr-e Dowlatabad | Mowtowr-e Dusahnbeh Dust Kam | Mowtowr-e Dushanbeh Rushni | Mowtowr-e Ebrahim | Mowtowr-e Ebrahim | Mowtowr-e Ebrahim | Mowtowr-e Ebrahim | Mowtowr-e Ebrahim | Mowtowr-e Ebrahim | Mowtowr-e Ebrahim Pikary | Mowtowr-e Ebrahim Sheh Bakhsh | Mowtowr-e Eid Mohammad | Mowtowr-e Eid Mohammad | Mowtowr-e Eid va Naruyi Hesaruiyeh | Mowtowr-e Emam Allah Qanbar Zehi | Mowtowr-e Emam Bakhsh | Mowtowr-e Emam Bakhsh Abdollahi | Mowtowr-e Emam Bakhsh | Mowtowr-e Emam Bakhsh | Mowtowr-e Emanollah | Mowtowr-e Emanollah | Mowtowr-e Emanollah | Mowtowr-e Eslam Bakhsh | Mowtowr-e Esmail | Mowtowr-e Esmail | Mowtowr-e Esmail | Mowtowr-e Ezzat Rigi | Mowtowr-e Fajr | Mowtowr-e Faqir Mohammad Jadgal | Mowtowr-e Fatameh Sheh Bakhsh | Mowtowr-e Feyz Mohammad | Mowtowr-e Feyzollah Qanbar Zehi | Mowtowr-e Firuz Rigi | Mowtowr-e Gami | Mowtowr-e Gami | Mowtowr-e Garsaz Hoseynabad | Mowtowr-e Geza Beyk | Mowtowr-e Gholam Ali | Mowtowr-e Gholam Hoseyn | Mowtowr-e Gholam Hoseyn Iran | Mowtowr-e Gholam Hoseyn Naruyi | Mowtowr-e Gholam Mohammad | Mowtowr-e Gholam Mohammad | Mowtowr-e Gholam Nabi | Mowtowr-e Gholam Qaderbadpa | Mowtowr-e Gholam Rasul | Mowtowr-e Gholam Sarur Nuti Zehi | Mowtowr-e Gholam Sheh Bakhsh | Mowtowr-e Gol Khatun | Mowtowr-e Gol Khatun | Mowtowr-e Gol Mohammad | Mowtowr-e Gol Mohammad | Mowtowr-e Gol Mohammad | Mowtowr-e Gol Mohammad | Mowtowr-e Gol Mohammad | Mowtowr-e Gol Mohammad | Mowtowr-e Gol Mohammad Palangi | Mowtowr-e Gol Mohammad Spahi | Mowtowr-e Gol Mohammad | Mowtowr-e Gol Mohammad | Mowtowr-e Gol Zaman | Mowtowr-e Golab | Mowtowr-e Golab Qanbar Zehi | Mowtowr-e Gorgi | Mowtowr-e Gorgij | Mowtowr-e Habib Baluch Khan | Mowtowr-e Habib Naruyi | Mowtowr-e Habibollah Sheh Bakhsh | Mowtowr-e Habibollah | Mowtowr-e Habibollah | Mowtowr-e Habibollah | Mowtowr-e Haji Rezayi | Mowtowr-e Hajj Abdollah Sheh Bakhsh | Mowtowr-e Hajj Ahmad | Mowtowr-e Hajj Ahmad Ali Moradi | Mowtowr-e Hajj Asa Qanbar Zehi | Mowtowr-e Hajj Azim Gangu Zehi | Mowtowr-e Hajj Bahader | Mowtowr-e Hajj Del Morad Nuti Zehi | Mowtowr-e Hajj Ebrahim | Mowtowr-e Hajj Gholam Qanbar Zehi | Mowtowr-e Hajj Mahmud | Mowtowr-e Hajj Masa Farqanbar Zehi | Mowtowr-e Hajj Mohammad | Mowtowr-e Hajj Mohammad | Mowtowr-e Hajj Naser Brahuyi | Mowtowr-e Hajj Nik Amol | Mowtowr-e Hajj Qader | Mowtowr-e Hajj Yaqub | Mowtowr-e Hajj Yusef Sheh Bakhsh | Mowtowr-e Hajji Abbas | Mowtowr-e Hajji Abdel | Mowtowr-e Hajji Abdel Qanbar Zehi | Mowtowr-e Hajji Abdol Rahim | Mowtowr-e Hajji Abdol | Mowtowr-e Hajji Abdol | Mowtowr-e Hajji Ahmad | Mowtowr-e Hajji Ahmad | Mowtowr-e Hajji Akbar | Mowtowr-e Hajji Alam | Mowtowr-e Hajji Ali | Mowtowr-e Hajji Allah Bakhsh Shah Nowazy | Mowtowr-e Hajji Aman Allah | Mowtowr-e Hajji Amid | Mowtowr-e Hajji Aqa Mohammad | Mowtowr-e Hajji Bandu | Mowtowr-e Hajji Bayan | Mowtowr-e Hajji Dadager | Mowtowr-e Hajji Dadkhoda | Mowtowr-e Hajji Del Morad | Mowtowr-e Hajji Din Mohammad | Mowtowr-e Hajji Ebrahim | Mowtowr-e Hajji Ebrahim | Mowtowr-e Hajji Ebrahim | Mowtowr-e Hajji Ebrahim Ta Gazi | Mowtowr-e Hajji Eydu | Mowtowr-e Hajji Faqir | Mowtowr-e Hajji Fulad | Mowtowr-e Hajji Gaza Beyk | Mowtowr-e Hajji Gehram | Mowtowr-e Hajji Ghafur | Mowtowr-e Hajji Ghani Sheh Bakhsh | Mowtowr-e Hajji Gholam | Mowtowr-e Hajji Gol Bibi | Mowtowr-e Hajji Gol Mohammad | Mowtowr-e Hajji Golzar | Mowtowr-e Hajji Hakim | Mowtowr-e Hajji Hakim | Mowtowr-e Hajji Hanif | Mowtowr-e Hajji Heydar | Mowtowr-e Hajji Heydar | Mowtowr-e Hajji Hoseyn | Mowtowr-e Hajji Hoseyn | Mowtowr-e Hajji Isa | Mowtowr-e Hajji Jama | Mowtowr-e Hajji Jan Mohammad | Mowtowr-e Hajji Jelal | Mowtowr-e Hajji Jelal | Mowtowr-e Hajji Jelayi | Mowtowr-e Hajji Karam | Mowtowr-e Hajji Karim | Mowtowr-e Hajji Lashkaran | Mowtowr-e Hajji Lashkaran | Mowtowr-e Hajji Majid | Mowtowr-e Hajji Majid | Mowtowr-e Hajji Malek Dad Rigi | Mowtowr-e Hajji Mehrab | Mowtowr-e Hajji Mehrab | Mowtowr-e Hajji Mezar | Mowtowr-e Hajji Mohammad | Mowtowr-e Hajji Mohammad | Mowtowr-e Hajji Mohammad Nur | Mowtowr-e Hajji Mohammad Nur | Mowtowr-e Hajji Mohammad Rigi | Mowtowr-e Hajji Mohammad Sharif | Mowtowr-e Hajji Mohammad Zard Kuhi | Mowtowr-e Hajji Mohammad | Mowtowr-e Hajji Morad | Mowtowr-e Hajji Morad Qanbar Zehi | Mowtowr-e Hajji Nabi | Mowtowr-e Hajji Naser | Mowtowr-e Hajji Nawab Ali Zehi | Mowtowr-e Hajji Nazer | Mowtowr-e Hajji Nazer | Mowtowr-e Hajji Nazer | Mowtowr-e Hajji Omid | Mowtowr-e Hajji Omid | Mowtowr-e Hajji Omid | Mowtowr-e Hajji Pakir | Mowtowr-e Hajji Pati | Mowtowr-e Hajji Pir Mohammad | Mowtowr-e Hajji Pirdad | Mowtowr-e Hajji Qader | Mowtowr-e Hajji Qader Bakhsh | Mowtowr-e Hajji Rasul | Mowtowr-e Hajji Rasul | Mowtowr-e Hajji Rostam | Mowtowr-e Hajji Sahbadad | Mowtowr-e Hajji Sahbadad | Mowtowr-e Hajji Shah Nazer | Mowtowr-e Hajji Shah Nowaz Rigi | Mowtowr-e Hajji Sharif | Mowtowr-e Hajji Sharif Qanbar Zehi | Mowtowr-e Hajji Shir Mohammad Janguneh | Mowtowr-e Hajji Sohrab | Mowtowr-e Hajji Taj Mohammad | Mowtowr-e Hajji Vali Mohammad Naruyi | Mowtowr-e Hajji Yar Mohammad | Mowtowr-e Hajji Yar Mohammad Shah Bakhsh | Mowtowr-e Hajji Zangi | Mowtowr-e Hakim | Mowtowr-e Halim | Mowtowr-e Halim Naruyi | Mowtowr-e Hamal | Mowtowr-e Hamid | Mowtowr-e Harun Amiri | Mowtowr-e Hasan Bamri | Mowtowr-e Hasan Jafarzehi | Mowtowr-e Hasan Kuseh | Mowtowr-e Hasan Matlaq | Mowtowr-e Hasan Sheh Bakhsh | Mowtowr-e Heydar | Mowtowr-e Heydar Hut | Mowtowr-e Heyyat | Mowtowr-e Holim Khan | Mowtowr-e Hoseyn | Mowtowr-e Hoseyn | Mowtowr-e Hoseyn | Mowtowr-e Hoseyn Khan | Mowtowr-e Hoseyn Naruyi Nosrati | Mowtowr-e Hoseyn | Mowtowr-e Idu | Mowtowr-e Idukuseh | Mowtowr-e Irani | Mowtowr-e Isa Zabardast | Mowtowr-e Isa | Mowtowr-e Jafar | Mowtowr-e Jafar Bamri | Mowtowr-e Jahangir | Mowtowr-e Jahangir | Mowtowr-e Jama | Mowtowr-e Jama | Mowtowr-e Jama Rahim Khan-e Dumak | Mowtowr-e Jamal | Mowtowr-e Jamal ol Din | Mowtowr-e Jameh Naderi | Mowtowr-e Jamhuri | Mowtowr-e Jamshid | Mowtowr-e Jehad | Mowtowr-e Jelal va Kimas | Mowtowr-e Jelal | Mowtowr-e Jelal | Mowtowr-e Jelayi | Mowtowr-e Jema | Mowtowr-e Jemaili-ye Dumak | Mowtowr-e Jihand | Mowtowr-e Jinehduk | Mowtowr-e Jomeh Qanbar Zehi | Mowtowr-e Kalsum Naruyi | Mowtowr-e Kamal ol Din Mohammadani | Mowtowr-e Kamran Gamshad Zehi | Mowtowr-e Kandal | Mowtowr-e Karam Beyk Naruyi | Mowtowr-e Karam Shah | Mowtowr-e Karim | Mowtowr-e Karim | Mowtowr-e Karim | Mowtowr-e Karim | Mowtowr-e Karim | Mowtowr-e Karim | Mowtowr-e Karim Bakhsh Gamshad Zehi | Mowtowr-e Karim Dad Horati | Mowtowr-e Karim Khan | Mowtowr-e Karim Kheyr Mohammad | Mowtowr-e Karim Nuti Zehi | Mowtowr-e Karim | Mowtowr-e Karim | Mowtowr-e Kemal | Mowtowr-e Kemal Khan | Mowtowr-e Khalil | Mowtowr-e Khan Bibi | Mowtowr-e Khan Mohammad | Mowtowr-e Khan Mohammad Kaseh | Mowtowr-e Khan Mohammad Naruyi | Mowtowr-e Khan Mohammad Naruyi-ye Dumak | Mowtowr-e Khan Mohammad | Mowtowr-e Khan Mohammad | Mowtowr-e Kheyr Mohammad | Mowtowr-e Kheyr Mohammad | Mowtowr-e Kheyr Mohammad Huti | Mowtowr-e Kheyr Mohammad | Mowtowr-e Khoda Bakhsh | Mowtowr-e Khoda Bakhsh | Mowtowr-e Khoda Bakhsh Janab Dasht Mahal | Mowtowr-e Khoda Bakhsh Rigi | Mowtowr-e Khoda Bakhsh | Mowtowr-e Khoda Nazer | Mowtowr-e Khoda Nazer | Mowtowr-e Khoda Rahm | Mowtowr-e Khoda Rahm | Mowtowr-e Khoda Rahm | Mowtowr-e Khodad Gamshad Zehi | Mowtowr-e Khodadad | Mowtowr-e Khodadad | Mowtowr-e Khodadad Baluch Zehi | Mowtowr-e Khodadad Sheh Bakhsh | Mowtowr-e Khodadad | Mowtowr-e Khodadad | Mowtowr-e Khodadad | Mowtowr-e Khosravi | Mowtowr-e Khurshid | Mowtowr-e Khvabiar | Mowtowr-e Khvasti Nuti Zehi | Mowtowr-e Kichi | Mowtowr-e Kuh Nuri | Mowtowr-e Lal Mohammad | Mowtowr-e Lal Mohammad | Mowtowr-e Lal Mohammad | Mowtowr-e Lashkaran | Mowtowr-e Lashkaran | Mowtowr-e Lashkaran | Mowtowr-e Lashkaran | Mowtowr-e Lashkaran | Mowtowr-e Latif Geragheh | Mowtowr-e Mabin | Mowtowr-e Mah Gol Qanbar Zehi | Mowtowr-e Mahdi | Mowtowr-e Mahdi Salari | Mowtowr-e Mahim Naruyi | Mowtowr-e Mahmud Shirani | Mowtowr-e Mahtaj Naruyi Nuraldini | Mowtowr-e Majid | Mowtowr-e Majid Nowti Zehi | Mowtowr-e Majid Tanideh | Mowtowr-e Malang | Mowtowr-e Malek Shah | Mowtowr-e Malek Shah Qanbar Zehi | Mowtowr-e Malek | Mowtowr-e Malek | Mowtowr-e Malekabad | Mowtowr-e Malekdad | Mowtowr-e Mansur | Mowtowr-e Masha Allah | Mowtowr-e Mazar | Mowtowr-e Mazar Karimi | Mowtowr-e Mehrab | Mowtowr-e Mehrab Mehrabad | Mowtowr-e Mehrab | Mowtowr-e Mehrab | Mowtowr-e Mir Beyk | Mowtowr-e Mir Beyk | Mowtowr-e Mir Huti Naruyi | Mowtowr-e Mirak | Mowtowr-e Mirza | Mowtowr-e Mirza Khan | Mowtowr-e Mirza Khan Bibi | Mowtowr-e Mirza | Mowtowr-e Mohammad | Mowtowr-e Mohammad | Mowtowr-e Mohammad | Mowtowr-e Mohammad Ali | Mowtowr-e Mohammad Ali Gorgich | Mowtowr-e Mohammad Ali Rigi | Mowtowr-e Mohammad Amin | Mowtowr-e Mohammad Amr | Mowtowr-e Mohammad Amr Tutazehi | Mowtowr-e Mohammad Andarvazh | Mowtowr-e Mohammad Arjemandi | Mowtowr-e Mohammad Dad Karimi | Mowtowr-e Mohammad Faqir | Mowtowr-e Mohammad Gol | Mowtowr-e Mohammad Hasan | Mowtowr-e Mohammad Hasan | Mowtowr-e Mohammad Hasan | Mowtowr-e Mohammad Hasan Naruyi | Mowtowr-e Mohammad Hasan | Mowtowr-e Mohammad Heyyat | Mowtowr-e Mohammad Hoseyn | Mowtowr-e Mohammad Hoseyn Nuti Zehi | Mowtowr-e Mohammad Hoseyn Shahli Bar | Mowtowr-e Mohammad Jafar Zehi | Mowtowr-e Mohammad Karim | Mowtowr-e Mohammad Khan | Mowtowr-e Mohammad Miran Qanbar Zehi | Mowtowr-e Mohammad Naruyi | Mowtowr-e Mohammad Naruyi Validad | Mowtowr-e Mohammad Nur | Mowtowr-e Mohammad Nursheh Bakhsh va Abdol Hamid | Mowtowr-e Mohammad Rahim | Mowtowr-e Mohammad Rasul Naruyi | Mowtowr-e Mohammad Reza | Mowtowr-e Mohammad Soltan | Mowtowr-e Mohammad Yusef Brahuyi | Mowtowr-e Mohammad Zaman | Mowtowr-e Mohammad Zeman | Mowtowr-e Mohammad | Mowtowr-e Mohim Naruyi | Mowtowr-e Mohim Yarak Zehi | Mowtowr-e Molla Aziz | Mowtowr-e Molla Bakhsh Kuseh | Mowtowr-e Molla Baluch | Mowtowr-e Molla Hasan | Mowtowr-e Molla Masariyan Gamshad Zehi | Mowtowr-e Molla Musa | Mowtowr-e Molla Qader | Mowtowr-e Molla Vahid Kelkeli | Mowtowr-e Morad Abdollahi | Mowtowr-e Morad Bakhsh Damani | Mowtowr-e Morad Naruyi | Mowtowr-e Morid | Mowtowr-e Mostafa Nuti Zehi | Mowtowr-e Mostafa Qanbar Zehi-ye Dumak | Mowtowr-e Mului Khoda Nazer | Mowtowr-e Mului Rahmat Allah | Mowtowr-e Muluy Abdollah | Mowtowr-e Muluy Jan Mohammad Naruyi | Mowtowr-e Muluy Mohammad Gol | Mowtowr-e Musa | Mowtowr-e Musa | Mowtowr-e Musa Bamri | Mowtowr-e Musa Faqir | Mowtowr-e Musa Naruyi Farzand Rahmat | Mowtowr-e Musa Nuti Zehi Padeshahi | Mowtowr-e Musa | Mowtowr-e Musa | Mowtowr-e Nabi | Mowtowr-e Nabi Bakhsh Baluch Zehi | Mowtowr-e nader | Mowtowr-e Nader | Mowtowr-e Naderabad | Mowtowr-e Najm ol Din | Mowtowr-e Narmashiry | Mowtowr-e Naser | Mowtowr-e Naser Gargij | Mowtowr-e Nasrollah | Mowtowr-e Navab Jadgal | Mowtowr-e Nawab Jeyhand | Mowtowr-e Nawab | Mowtowr-e Nawab | Mowtowr-e Nazer | Mowtowr-e Nazer | Mowtowr-e Nazer | Mowtowr-e Nazer | Mowtowr-e Nazer | Mowtowr-e Nazer Basham Naruyi Keh Hesaruiyeh | Mowtowr-e Nazer Qanbar Zehi | Mowtowr-e Nazer Qanbar Zehi | Mowtowr-e Nazer Sheh Bakhsh | Mowtowr-e Nazer Sheh Bakhsh | Mowtowr-e Nazer | Mowtowr-e Nazer | Mowtowr-e Nemat | Mowtowr-e Nemat Allah | Mowtowr-e Neyaz Naruyi | Mowtowr-e Niaz Moyammad | Mowtowr-e Nik Amal | Mowtowr-e Nik Mohammad | Mowtowr-e Nowruz | Mowtowr-e Nur Mohammad | Mowtowr-e Nur Mohammad | Mowtowr-e Nur Mohammad | Mowtowr-e Nur Mohammad Busheh | Mowtowr-e Nur Mohammad Darkhashandeh | Mowtowr-e Nur Mohammad Khanzehi | Mowtowr-e Nur Mohammad Lehdad | Mowtowr-e Nur Mohammad Seyyed Khan | Mowtowr-e Nur Mohammad Sheh Bakhsh | Mowtowr-e Nur Mohammad Sheh Bakhsh | Mowtowr-e Nur Mohammad Sheh Bakhsh | Mowtowr-e Nur Mohammad | Mowtowr-e Nur Mohammad | Mowtowr-e Nur Mohmmadabad | Mowtowr-e Nur ol Din | Mowtowr-e Omid | Mowtowr-e Osman | Mowtowr-e Owrang Huti | Mowtowr-e Pakir | Mowtowr-e Panzadeh Khordad | Mowtowr-e Panzdah Khordad | Mowtowr-e Par ol Din Jangian | Mowtowr-e Pariya | Mowtowr-e Parviz Sheh Bakhsh | Mowtowr-e Pasand | Mowtowr-e Pasand | Mowtowr-e Pasnad | Mowtowr-e Pasran Mahmud Isa Zehi | Mowtowr-e Pati Mohammad | Mowtowr-e Pati Mohammad | Mowtowr-e Pey Khvasteh | Mowtowr-e Pir Bakhsh | Mowtowr-e Pir Bakhsh Kamkar | Mowtowr-e Pir Mohammad | Mowtowr-e Pir Mohammad | Mowtowr-e Pir Mohammad Rigi | Mowtowr-e Pir Mohammad | Mowtowr-e Piri | Mowtowr-e Qader | Mowtowr-e Qader Bakhsh | Mowtowr-e Qader Bakhsh | Mowtowr-e Qader Bakhsh | Mowtowr-e Qalandar | Mowtowr-e Qanbar Zehi | Mowtowr-e Qasemabad | Mowtowr-e Qeysar Rigi | Mowtowr-e Qis | Mowtowr-e Rahim | Mowtowr-e Rahim | Mowtowr-e Rahim Bakhsh | Mowtowr-e Rahim | Mowtowr-e Rahimabad | Mowtowr-e Rahman | Mowtowr-e Rahman Gorgich | Mowtowr-e Rahmat | Mowtowr-e Rahmat Rahmatabad | Mowtowr-e Rashid | Mowtowr-e Rashid | Mowtowr-e Rashid | Mowtowr-e Rashid | Mowtowr-e Rasul | Mowtowr-e Rasul | Mowtowr-e Rasul Bakhsh Darkalleh | Mowtowr-e Rasul Bakhsh Fatiyeh Mohammad | Mowtowr-e Rasul Bakhsh Jadgal | Mowtowr-e Rasul | Mowtowr-e Rasul | Mowtowr-e Rasul | Mowtowr-e Reza Naruyi | Mowtowr-e Rezayi Badfar | Mowtowr-e Riazi | Mowtowr-e Rostam Baluch Zehi | Mowtowr-e Ruhollah Bamri | Mowtowr-e Rushan | Mowtowr-e Ruz ol Din | Mowtowr-e Safar | Mowtowr-e Safar | Mowtowr-e Safar | Mowtowr-e Saheb Khan | Mowtowr-e Sahebdad | Mowtowr-e Saleh Mohammad | Mowtowr-e Samandar | Mowtowr-e Saraj | Mowtowr-e Satar | Mowtowr-e Setar | Mowtowr-e Seyyd Mohammad | Mowtowr-e Seyyed Ahmad | Mowtowr-e Seyyed Khan | Mowtowr-e Seyyed Mohammad | Mowtowr-e Seyyed Mohammad | Mowtowr-e Seyyed Mohammad Baluch | Mowtowr-e Seyyed Mohammad Sheh Bakhsh | Mowtowr-e Seyyed Mohammad Siakhan | Mowtowr-e Seyyed Mohammad | Mowtowr-e Seyyed Mohammad | Mowtowr-e Seyyed Navaz Alishah | Mowtowr-e Seyyed Shahak Zehi | Mowtowr-e Shah Borat | Mowtowr-e Shah Karim Rigi | Mowtowr-e Shah Mohammad Ekhtar | Mowtowr-e Shah Nazer | Mowtowr-e Shah Pari Sheh Bakhsh | Mowtowr-e Shahbaz | Mowtowr-e Shahdad Qanbar Zehi | Mowtowr-e Shahdust Naruyi | Mowtowr-e Shahid Jameh | Mowtowr-e Shahid Malek Gamshazarhi | Mowtowr-e Shahid Zarak Gamshazarhi | Mowtowr-e Shakur | Mowtowr-e Shanbeh | Mowtowr-e Sharif | Mowtowr-e Sharif | Mowtowr-e Sharif | Mowtowr-e Sharif Khak Sefidi | Mowtowr-e Sheh Bakhsh | Mowtowr-e Sheh Dust | Mowtowr-e Sheykh Mohammad Mahmudi | Mowtowr-e Shir Mohammad | Mowtowr-e Shir Mohammad | Mowtowr-e Shir Mohammad | Mowtowr-e Shir Mohammad | Mowtowr-e Shiva | Mowtowr-e Siah Khan | Mowtowr-e Siah Khan | Mowtowr-e Sohrab | Mowtowr-e Sohrab | Mowtowr-e Sohrab | Mowtowr-e Soleyman | Mowtowr-e Soleyman Khatr | Mowtowr-e Soltan Mohammad | Mowtowr-e Soltan Mohammad | Mowtowr-e Taj Mohammad | Mowtowr-e Taj Mohammad | Mowtowr-e Taj Mohammad Hasan | Mowtowr-e Taj Mohammad Pahang | Mowtowr-e Taj Mohammad Raisi | Mowtowr-e Taji Mohammad Hut | Mowtowr-e Tavakkolabad | Mowtowr-e Tusi | Mowtowr-e Vali Mohammad | Mowtowr-e Vali Mohammad | Mowtowr-e Vali Mohammad | Mowtowr-e Yadollah | Mowtowr-e Yar Mohammad | Mowtowr-e Yar Mohammad Naruyi Mokhtar | Mowtowr-e Yusef | Mowtowr-e Yusef | Mowtowr-e Yusef | Mowtowr-e Yusef | Mowtowr-e Yusef | Mowtowr-e Yusef Rudini | Mowtowr-e Yusef | Mowtowr-e Zabudi | Mowtowr-e Zaman | Mowtowr-e Zarin | Mowtowr-e Zelikha | Mowtowr-e Zeman Khan | Mowtowr-e Zeman Khan Badi Dak | Mowtowr-e Zeman Khan Kachul | Mowtowr-e Zeman Khan | Mowtowr-e Zeman Khan | Mowtowr-e Zeman | Mujan | Muki | Muki-ye Bala | Muki-ye Pain | Multan | Muluyabad | Muman-e Bala | Muman-e Pain | Muman-e Vasat | Muraki | Murdan | Murin Pish | Murt Anjir | Murt | Murtak-e Pain | Murtan | Murtan | Murtankuh | Murti | Musa Chah | Musa Kuhkan | Musa Shahbaz | Musaabad | Muzaik Sazi | Muzan

=== N ===
Nabahri | Nabakhsh | Nabi Rud | Nabiabad | Nabiabad | Nabiabad | Nabiabad | Nabiabad-e Kudaki | Nabiabad-e Pudchah | Nadag Dan | Nadan | Nadariti | Nadekan-e Gurmi | Nadekan-e Jami | Nadekan-e Shafi Mohammad | Nadekan-e Shahdad | Naderabad | Naderabad | Naderabad | Nadriti | Nadriti | Nadudak | Nag Pahan | Nagan | Nagan | Nagan | Nagan | Nagan | Nagan | Nagatabad-e Din Mohammad | Nagatak | Nagpahn-e Bala | Nagudar | Naguk | Naguk | Nahangi Karim Sarani | Nahuk | Nahuki | Naik | Naimabad | Najafabad | Nakuch | Nalaki | Nali | Naluk | Naluki | Naluki | Nalvad | Nangaru | Naran | Naranu | Narap | Naraqi | Narazad | Nargan | Narmak | Narun | Narun | Naserabad | Naserabad | Naserabad | Naserabad | Naserabad | Naserabad | Naserabad | Naserabad | Naserabad | Naserabad | Naserabad-e Bala | Naserabad-e Olya | Naserabad-e Sofla | Naserabad-e Talarak | Naseri | Nasirabad | Nasirabad | Naskand | Nasrabad-e Rutak | Navaran | Navazan Khorram | Navkan | Navvababad | Nayib-e Lajehi | Nazag Kallak | Nazarabad | Nazarabad | Nazarabad | Nazarabad | Nazarabad | Nazarabad | Nazarabad | Nazer Sarani | Nazerabad | Nazil | Nedam-e Gharbi | Nedam-e Sharqi | Negar | Negur | Negur | Neli | Nematabad | Nematabad | Nematabad | Nenduabad | Nespuran | Ney Padan | Neygerd | Nezhuk | Niam Kand | Niambit | Niamgaran | Niazabad | Nik Mohammad | Nik Shahr | Nikabad | Niku Jahan | Nil | Nilak Bon | Nilak | Nilgan | Nilukan | Nimgan | Nirahi | Nirugah Gazi | Nokombokan | Nosratabad | Nosratabad Integrated Fams | Nosratabad | Nosratabad | Novalak | Now Kai Kol | Now Kandan | Now Kin Jahan | Now Shirvan-e Khaneh Hay Darvish | Nowband | Nowbandian-e Baluchi | Nowbandian-e Pain | Nowhani Bazar | Nowris | Nowziar | Nugar | Nuk Band | Nuk Bandak Brahuyi | Nuk Chah | Nuk Chah-e Sohrab | Nuk Ju | Nuk Kanak | Nukabad | Nukabad | Nukabad | Nukabad | Nukabad | Nukabad | Nukabad | Nukabad | Nukabad | Nukabad | Nukabad | Nukabad | Nukabad | Nukabad | Nukabad | Nukabad | Nukabad | Nukabad | Nukabad | Nukabad | Nukabad | Nukabad | Nukabad | Nukabad | Nukabad | Nukabad-e Gonbad | Nukabad-e Janglian | Nukabad-e Luchu | Nukabad-e Pain | Nukabad-e Sarhang | Nukabad-e Shahdad | Nukan | Nukdar | Nukidar | Nukin Deh | Nukjub | Nur Bakhsh Siahani | Nur Mohammad Bazar | Nur Mohammad Dartakideh | Nur Mohammad | Nur Mohammad | Nur Mohammad-e Jahan Tigh | Nur Mohammad-e Yusef Rudini | Nurabad | Nurabad | Nurabad | Nurabad | Nurabad | Nurabad | Nurabad | Nurabad | Nurabad | Nurabad | Nurabad | Nurabad-e Dasht Abkhvan | Nurabad-e Sar Talap | Nuri | Nury | Nushabad | Nut

=== O ===
Omarabad | Osman Bazar | Osmanabad | Osmanbazar | Owrai | Owraki Bozorg-e Olya | Owraki Malang Bazar | Owraki Molla Abdol Rahman | Owrang | Owriz

=== P ===
Padagi | Padagi Station | Padagi | Padagi-ye Pain | Padehi | Padeshahi-ye Bala Siah Lup | Padgan | Padgan-e Golzar | Padgi | Padguk | Padik | Padkub | Pag | Pag | Pahnam | Pakak Hajji Heydar | Pakir Mahmud | Pakir Shahsavar | Palang Sar | Palangiabad | Palangiabad | Palangi-ye Adernag | Palani | Paleh Sin | Palgi Bazi | Palgi | Palgi | Palgi-ye Khamar | Palgi-ye Pain Shahsavar | Palgi-ye Seyyed | Palizan | Palizy | Palizy-e Dar Giaban | Palkchar | Pam Pabanzin | Pamont | Pand | Pandak | Panik | Panjak | Panjshanbeh Bazar | Panjshanbeh Bazar | Pankur | Pansan | Pansareh | Papabi-ye Bala | Papabi-ye Pain | Parak-e Bashir | Parak-e Hutan | Parak-e Morad | Parak-e Sheykhan | Parchak | Parchan | Parchang | Pardelabad | Pardelabad-e Hesaruiyeh | Pardisabad | Pardizak | Parekan | Parisan | Pariz | Parkan | Parkan | Parkani Lup | Parkant | Parmaru | Partang | Parud | Parud | Parudin | Parumi Hajji Heydar | Parviz | Pas Kusheh | Pasa Bandar | Pasak | Pasand Khan | Pasar Mordan | Pasgah Gazbestan | Pasgah Hudian | Pasgah Zeh Molla Sharif | Pashamak | Paskuh | Pat | Patan, Iran | Patantak | Patar | Patgan | Patiki-ye Bala Javan Tall | Patiki-ye Pain | Patkak | Patkan | Patkan | Patkan-e Bala | Patkan-e Pain | Patkuhi | Patkuk | Patkuk | Patmati | Patti | Pattihan Bazar | Paval | Paygah-ye Rud Mahi | Pazard | Pedehi | Pensakan | Perdalabad | Perom | Persian Gulf Integrated Fisheries | Peshkabad | Pestak | Petti Mohammad Jadgal | Petti | Pey Tab-e Jam | Pich Gali | Pigol | Pil Gushkan | Ping | Pip | Pir Gazan | Pir Kashan | Pir Sir | Pir Sohrab | Pir Zarin | Pir | Pirabad | Pirabad | Pirahan Gavash | Pirai-ye Bala | Pirai-ye Pain | Piran Dakht | Piran | Piran | Piran | Piranch | Pirchah | Pirdan | Pireh Chah | Piri | Piri | Piridan | Pirkan | Pirmati Kallag | Pirmis | Pirsar | Pish Mant-e Owl | Pishin | Pishnek | Pist Mowtowr-e Savary | Pogumzyi | Pol Asbi | Polan | Polkan | Portabad | Porukestan | Poshot | Posht Gar | Posht Giaban | Posht Gorg | Posht Rud | Posht-e Dasht | Posht-e Zard | Poshteh-ye Kamal | Poshteh-ye Pirdad | Poshti | Poshtkuk | Poskuhi | Post and Customs | Potahk | Potak | Potan | Potan | Pozm-e Machchan | Pozm-e Tiab | Pud Chah-e Din Mohammad | Pudineh | Nagat | Pujarak | Pur Janki | Purchang Gesk | Purchangan | Purchanian Dap | Purjangi | Purjangi | Pusar | Putap | Puter

=== Q ===
Qaderabad | Qaderabad | Qaderabad | Qaderabad | Qaderabad | Qaderabad | Qaderabad | Qaderabad | Qaderabad | Qaderabad | Qaderabad-e Murtan | Qaemabad | Qajar Barani | Qajar Mohammad Hasan | Qajr Kasuri | Qaleh Bid | Qaleh Kohneh | Qaleh Now | Qaleh Rostam | Qaleh Rostam | Qaleh Sam | Qaleh-ye Del Asa | Qaleh-ye Hasan | Qaleh-ye Kang | Qaleh-ye Tarvan | Qaljehi | Qanat-e Abdol Ghani | Qanat-e Abdol Hakim | Qanat-e Allahabad | Qanat-e Del Morad-e Bala | Qanat-e Emam Qader | Qanat-e Feyz Mohammad | Qanat-e Golzar | Qanat-e Hajji Ebrahim | Qanat-e Hajji Feyz Mohammad | Qanat-e Hajji Gol Mohammad | Qanat-e Hajji Mastan | Qanat-e Hajji Mirza | Qanat-e Hajji Pirdad | Qanat-e Hajji Shir Mohammad | Qanat-e Maduhi | Qanat-e Mir Qalandar | Qanat-e Nur Mohammad | Qanat-e Palangiabad | Qanat-e Pirdad | Qanat-e Rowghani | Qanat-e Rudin | Qanat-e Seyyed Mohammad Padeshahi | Qanat-e Shah Mohammad Sheh Bakhsh | Qanat-e Taj Mohammad | Qanat-e Tajak Naruyi | Qanbar Zehi | Qand | Qandab | Qarah Yaghi | Qarqaruk | Qasem Bampury Jalilabad | Qasemabad | Qasemabad | Qasemabad | Qasemabad | Qasemabad | Qasemabad | Qasemabad | Qasemabad-e Gonbad | Qasr-e Qand | Qateri | Qazaq | Qaziabad | Qazizadeh | Qeblehi Kur | Qodratabad-e Pudchah | Qorqori | Qus ol Din Bamadi

=== R ===
Rabuzehi | Rachdar | Radio Broadcrasting Station | Radio Station | Raduabad | Radudaj | Radu-ye Pain | Radu-ye Polan | Ragdaf | Raginan | Ragiti | Ragsha | Rah Dergaz | Rahatuk | Rahdar | Rahim Khan Sarani | Rahimabad | Rahimabad | Rahimabad | Rahimabad | Rahimabad | Rahimabad | Rahimabad | Rahimabad-e Espitaki | Rahimiabad | Rahinag | Rahmanabad | Rahmanabad | Rahmanabad | Rahmanabad | Rahmanabad | Rahmatabad | Rahmatabad | Rahmatabad | Rahmatabad | Rahmatabad | Rahmatabad | Rahmatabad | Rahmatabad | Rahmatabad | Rahmatabad | Rahmatabad | Rahmatabad | Rahmatabad | Rahmatabad | Rahmatabad | Rahmatabad | Rahmatabad | Rahmatabad-e Gary | Rahmatabad-e Pain | Raisabad | Rakhshan | Rakhshani | Ramazan Kalag | Ramin | Ramk | Rampan | Ramsh | Ramtuk Dap | Randak | Randeh Shahraki | Rangazan | Rank | Rasak | Rashak | Rashkan | Rastehi | Rasul Gholam | Rasulabad | Rasulabad | Rasulabad | Rasulabad | Rasulabad | Rasul-e Afghan | Rasul-e Sarani | Ravak | Ravak | Ravan Dap | Ravang | Rayin Gitan | Razi | Rebabad | Rebabad | Regentog | Regeti | Reys | Rezi | Richkan | Rig Band Sar | Rig Safar | Rigabad | Rigabad | Rig-e Kaput | Rig-e Muri | Rigechi-ye Bala | Rigechi-ye Pain | Rigechi-ye Vasat | Rigedan | Rigukan | Rihani | Riku | Rikukash | Rimdan-e Bankul | Rimlan-e Kamal | Rimlan-e Pain | Rimlan-e Vosta | Ripak-e Abdok | Ripak-e Lal Mohammad | Ripak-e Pirandad | Ripak-e Saleh | Ripak-e Shiran | Rish Pish-e Bala | Rish Pish-e Pain | Rishpesh | Ritk | Robat | Roknabad | Rostam Bazar Nalant | Rostam Mahmud | Rostam | Rostamabad | Rostamabad | Rostamabad | Rowghani | Rowshanabad | Rubahak Radu Chahi | Rubahuk | Rud Balu | Rud Bon | Rud Mahi | Rud Saran | Rudan | Rudbar | Rud-e Gaz | Rud-e Gol Andam | Rud-e Sanib | Rudgar | Rudi | Rudik-e Karim Bakhsh | Rudik-e Mahmud-e Pain | Rudik-e Molladad | Rudik-e Sahebdad | Rudkan | Rudy | Rufnan | Rug | Ruhgam-e Bala | Ruhgam-e Pain | Ruku | Rupas-e Bala | Rupas-e Pain | Rupasi | Rushnabad | Rustai-ye Isa Zehi | Rustayi Muluy-e Khoda Rahm Rudini | Rustayi-ye Duran Khan | Rustayi-ye Hashemabad | Rustayi-ye Sam | Rustayi-ye Sefidak | Rustay-ye Mohammadabad Mohammad Rahman

=== S ===
Sabatan | Sabilan-e Gamshad | Sabilan-e Jafar | Sabrabad | Sabrabad | Sabz Gaz-e Olya | Sabz Gaz-e Sofla | Sabz Gaz-e Vosta | Sabz Pushan | Sabz | Sabzvar Keshmir | Sad Durban | Sad Fahreh | Sadaki | Sadeqabad | Sadif | Sadrabad | Safar Barfi | Safar Zai | Safar Zehi | Safarabad | Safarabad | Safarabad | Saftak | Sagar | Sagar Tall | Saghirabad | Sagis | Saheb Khan Barani | Sahman-e Hit | Sahran | Sahreh Bon | Sahrok | Saidabad | Saidabad | Saidabad | Saidabad | Saidabad | Saidabad | Saidabad | Saidabad | Saidabad | Saidabad | Saidabad | Saidabad-e Kudaki | Saidabad-e Shandak | Sakan | Sakhiabad | Sakhteman | Sakuk | Sakuran | Salar Barim | Saleh Khan | Saleh Khan | Saleh Mohammad Shahriyari | Salehabad | Salehabad | Samad | Samad-e Deh-e Mardeh | Samak | Sammach-e Korg | Sammach-e Mahmud | Sammach-e Miru | Samsurchah | Samsurdar | Samukan | Samukan Dap | Sanabad | Sanan | Sanat Sar | Sanchuli | Sandakzehi-ye Bala | Sandakzehi-ye Pain | Sand-e Bahram | Sand-e Hamzeh | Sand-e Mir Suiyan | Sand-e Nur Mohammad | Sandok | Sandsar | Sangan | Sangan | Sangan-e Kuknak | Sangan-e Sofla | Sangar Durak | Sangari-ye Hajji Jan Mohammad | Sangary | Sangary-ye Pain | Sangary-ye Qanat-e Gol Mohammad | Sang-e Lak | Sang-e Masjed | Sangi Chah | Sangun | Sanjar Bazar Taradan | Sanjarabad | Sanjarani | Sanjardeh Mardeh | Saptuk | Sar Ahangi | Sar Band | Sar Cheshmeh | Sar Daj Delmorad | Sar Dasht-e Sar Jangal | Sar Deh | Sar Gar | Sar Gazak | Sar Gol | Sar Jangan | Sar Kahnu | Sar Kahuran | Sar Kalandan | Sar Kam | Sar Kand | Sar Kang | Sar Keluki | Sar Rig | Sar Rud | Sar Sureh | Sar Tall | Sar Tall | Sar Tall | Sar Tap | Sar Tap | Sar Tapi | Sar Taruna | Sarab | Saran | Sarani | Sarani | Saravan | Saravani | Saraydan | Sarbak | Sarban-e Damuyi | Sarbaz | Sardab | Sardakan | Sardan | Sardar | Sardasht | Sardasht-e Nematabad | Sardegal Integrated Farming Industry | Sarferaz | Sargaruk | Sargdar Cheshmeh | Sargeh-ye Bala | Sargeh-ye Pain | Sargerani | Sargezi | Sari Gar | Sari Gat Hut Gat Bala | Sari Machan | Sariabad | Sarjub | Sarkajeh | Sarmaki | Sarmich | Sarnajdani | Sarsaru | Sartakhti-ye Shahabad | Sartala | Sartap | Saruk | Sarush | Sarvageh | Saryzeh | Sarzeh | Sarzeh | Sarzeh-ye Mirkhan | Sasuli | Sasuli | Satag | Sattani | Sayani | Sayegan | Sayyadan | Sazink-e Olya | Sediq Zehi | Sefid Naduk | Sefid Sang | Sefid Sang | Sefid Sang | Sefidabeh | Seh Boni | Seh Chahan | Seh Gun | Seh Machan | Seh Payeh-e Ziarat-e Gonbad | Seh Qaleh | Seh Qaleh | Seh Rud | Sekuheh | Send-e Morad | Senjedak | Sergan | Seribazar | Sey Salman | Sey Vik | Seyah Darreh | Seyah Takan | Seydaran | Seyfabad-e Javashiri | Seyfabad-e Naruyi | Seyyed Bar | Seyyed Khan | Seyyed Khan | Seyyed Khan | Seyyed Mohammad Bazar | Seyyed Mohammad Nur Qanbar Zehi Gorgij | Seyyedabad | Seyyedabad | Seyyedabad | Seyyedabad | Seyyedabad | Seyyedi Bazar | Shadi Gur | Shadi Kallak | Shadkam Dap | Shaghalak | Shah Beyk-e Molla Shahi | Shah Kafer | Shah Kahur | Shah Karam-e Pain | Shah Mir | Shah Mohammad Qasemi | Shah Nazerabad | Shahak Bazar | Shahbik Zehi | Shahdad Bazar | Shahdadabad | Shahdad-e Kahir | Shahi Chat | Shahid Beheshti Agro-Industrial Complex | Shahid Chamran | Shahid Deh Mardeh | Shahid Modarres | Shahid Qalanbar | Shahid Rejai | Shahid Shah Nazar | Shahidabad-e Saruk | Shahidan | Shahidayit-e Shandak | Shahmorad Deh | Shahr Bon | Shahr Dar-e Bala | Shahr Deraz | Shahrak Ashayiri-ye Khosrin | Shahrak Maskuni-ye Gavater | Shahrak | Shahrak | Shahrak | Shahrak | Shahrak-e Abu ol Fazl | Shahrak-e Ali Akbar | Shahrak-e Bozorg | Shahrak-e Chah-e Eshaq | Shahrak-e Eslamabad | Shahrak-e Gol Beyk | Shahrak-e Golkhani | Shahrak-e Gorg Heydarabad | Shahrak-e Hadabad | Shahrak-e Hasanabad | Shahrak-e Hoseynabad | Shahrak-e Kambuzia | Shahrak-e Keyanabad | Shahrak-e Kuchek | Shahrak-e Kuhak | Shahrak-e Musa Salari | Shahrak-e Piman | Shahrak-e Posht Giaban | Shahrak-e Qods | Shahrak-e Rig-e Malek | Shahrak-e Salari | Shahrak-e Sanchuli Residential Complex | Shahrak-e Sar Jangal | Shahrak-e Shahid Beheshti | Shahrak-e Shahid Beheshti | Shahrak-e Shahid Kallah Duz | Shahrak-e Shurchah | Shahrak-e Taqiabad | Shahraki | Shahrdan | Shahr-e Deraz | Shahr-e Deraz | Shahr-e Deraz | Shahr-e Deraz | Shahr-e Fulad | Shahr-e Gol Mohammad | Shahr-e Kamal | Shahriari | Shahriari | Shahruk | Shahryanch | Shahu Zahi | Shajahan | Shak Band | Shak Shichi | Shakband | Shakilabad | Shakshidar | Sham | Shamashk | Shameh Sar | Shameh Sar | Shamehsar | Shamel Bazar | Shamgat | Shamil | Shamsabad | Shamsabad | Shamsabad | Shan Shiri | Shanbeh Bar Gah | Shand | Shandak Qodratabad | Shandak Tavakkolabad | Shandan | Shandan | Shandel | Shandi | Shandukan | Shangary | Shankar | Sharaf ol Din | Sharag | Shardar | Sharekh | Sharif Qazaq | Sharifabad | Sharifabad | Sharifabad | Sharifabad | Sharifabad | Sharifabad | Sharifabad | Sharifabad | Sharifabad | Sharifabad-e Chah Kan | Shatar Mahmud | Shavatk | Shegim-e Bala | Shegim-e Pain | Shekar Jangal | Shekarabad | Sherkat Chah | Sherkat-e Tamp | Shesh Dangi-ye Golestan | Sheyban | Sheybani | Sheykh Alam | Sheykh Ebrahim Bazar Arab Zehi | Sheykh Kalag | Sheykh Langi | Sheykhan Karag | Shib Gureh | Shib Ju | Shib Torki | Shir Ali Khan | Shir Govaz | Shir Mohammad Bazar | Shir Mohammad Bazar | Shir Mohammad Gargij | Shir Mohammad-e Shir Zehi | Shirabad | Shirabad | Shirabad | Shirabad | Shirabad | Shirabad | Shirabad | Shirabad | Shirabad | Shirdel Sadak | Shiriki | Shirin Salar | Shirin Zad | Shirin | Shisheh Posht | Shitap | Shizin Patan | Shomahi | Shudik | Shukat Sarani | Shundeh | Shur Chah Khoda Bakhsh | Shur Matik | Shur | Shur | Shur | Shurab | Shurabad | Shurabad-e Fandaq | Shurak | Shurak | Shurak | Shuran | Shurchah Nagat | Shurcheh-ye Purgazy | Shureh Rud | Shurikan | Shuru | Shushgim | Shushment | Si Pach | Si Sarak Bon | Si Sarak Bon | Si Tall | Siadak Deh Mardeh | Siadak | Siadak | Siadan-e Sofla | Siah Bon | Siah Dak | Siah Ettefaq-e Pain | Siah Jak | Siah Jangal-e Bala | Siah Jangal-e Pain | Siah Kelak | Siah Khak | Siah Khan | Siah Khan | Siah Khan | Siah Kut | Siah Kut-e Anjireh | Siah Poshteh | Siah Sar | Siah Tavakk Jama Qanbar Zehi | Siah Tir-e Pain | Siah Tuk | Siah Yinkan | Siahangari | Siahin Pakanzan | Siahti Kalat | Sib | Sihaki | Sihaki Kuteh | Simli | Sin Kan | Sina Chu | Sir Gavanani | Sirag | Sirin Kur | Sirja | Sirkan | Sital | Sital | Sitar | Sitar-e Abdol Rahim | Sitar-e Ali | Sitar-e Mahmud | Siyahokan | Sizaki | Sizdehaban | Soheyl | Sohr Bon | Sohr Nilag | Sohrab Sheykhi | Sohrababad | Sohrab-e Gholami | Sohrin Duk | Sohrtak | Sohrtamp | Solur Bazar | Sonni Bazar | Sorkh Degar | Sorkh Gazi | Sorkh Gazi | Sorkh Gazi-ye Chah Gazi | Sorkh Kach | Sorkh Kalut | Sorkh Parak-e Bala | Sorkh Ruadan | Sorkhkan | Sorkhkan | Sufi Seyyedi | Suhran | Sukhteh Gaz | Sukhteh Mok | Sukhtehnag | Sul | Sul | Sulan | Suldan | Suldan | Suleki | Sulkuk | Sumar Zehi | Sumarbar | Sunat | Sur Ab | Sur Chagi | Sur Chahi | Surab Chakardak | Surab | Surak | Surakh Kuh | Suran | Surangetan | Surchah | Surgaf | Surgan | Surgu | Surkalud | Surkamp | Suru | Sutap

=== T ===
Tabaki Tal | Tabarjad | Taflak | Taghazi | Tah Rud | Tahati | Tahrak | Tahtan | Tajabad | Tajabad | Takash | Takhman Miri | Takht | Takht-e Malek | Takhteh Pol | Takhtun | Takur | Talang | Talarban | Talban | Taleqabad-e Palaki | Talkhab | Tall | Tall-e Mishan | Tamandan | Tambeka | Tamin | Tamiz | Tana | Tanak | Tanbalan | Tang Ab-e Kahukan | Tang-e Daf | Tang-e Hanzab | Tang-e Lakur | Tang-e Nadam | Tang-e Rahin | Tang-e Sar | Tang-e Sarhad | Tang-e Tanur | Tang-e Vajeg | Tangi | Tanhak | Tapagi Ap | Tappeh Daz | Tappeh Kaniz | Tappeh-ye Lal Mohammad | Taradak | Tarampuk | Taran | Tarati | Tareh-ye Darkhatkari Chesh | Tarin-e Berin | Tarquyi | Tarradeh | Tashkuk | Tasian | Tavakkol | Tavakkol | Tavakkolabad | Tavakkolabad | Tavakkolabad | Tavakkolabad | Tavakkolabad | Tavakkolabad-e Hurshi | Tavakkolabad-e Minuyi | Tavaran | Tavus | Tehrud | Tejkoft | Telaran | Telehdan-e Gamdad Bazar | Terati | Terati | Terati-ye Sang | Teymurabad | Teymurabad-e Sheykhi | Tiab | Tigh Ab | Tighab | Tighi | Tijnan-e Bala | Tijnan-e Pain | Tilag | Tilar | Tilvai | Ting | Tirabad | Tireh-ye Kheyrabad | Tis | Tiskupan | Tisorun-e Tisoruk | Titaran Dan | Tohman-e Ladi | Tom Tahlak | Tom Tilak | Tombi Dap | Tomp-e Rigan | Torkani | Torond | Torshab | Towd Lang | Towhidabad | Towhidabad | Towhidabad | Towlak Rud | Tud | Tudak-e Taqiabad | Tudan | Tudi | Tujak | Tujak-e Jadid | Tuji | Tujkan | Tuk | Tuk Dan | Tuk Mobarak | Tukali-ye Bala | Tukali-ye Pain | Tukar | Tukli Jangan | Tuli Ab | Tulkan | Turdan | Tutan | Tuti | Tutoran Dap | Tuzaki

=== U ===
Ugink | Ushab

=== V ===
Vaddu | Vadgar | Vafa | Vahadabad | Vahzary | Vakilabad | Vali Khormayi | Vali Mohammad Bazar | Vali Mohammad Kam Rah Sheh Bakhsh | Vali Mohammadabad | Valiabad | Valiabad | Valiabad | Valiabad | Vapag | Varedan | Varkat | Varmal | Vaselan | Vash Ab | Vash Ab Bidi | Vashapi | Vashdar | Vashin Chat | Vashkan Chan | Vashna | Vashnam-e Dari | Vashnam-e Dust Mohammad | Vashnam-e Eshaq | Vashnam-e Faqir Mohammad | Vashnam-e Hajji Ramazan | Vashnam-e Heydar Saleh Zahi | Vashnam-e Kheyr Mohammad | Vashnam-e Mirgol | Vashnam-e Morid | Vashnam-e Shahdad | Vasirin | Vatkuh | Vaveyla-ye Bala | Vellan

=== Y ===
Yadu Bazar | Yaqub Bazar | Yaqub Zehi | Yar Mohammad Bazar | Yar Mohammad-e Alam | Yar Mohammad-e Kharut | Yek Muki | Yunesabad | Yusef Hasan | Yusef Zehi | Yusefabad | Yusefabad | Yusefabad | Yusefabad | Yusefabad | Yusefabad | Yusefabad | Yusefabad-e Shuru | Yusefabad-e Tudak | Yusef-e Eslam | Yusof Zehi

=== Z ===
Zabol | Zabol Airport | Zaboli | Zafarabad | Zaghak | Zahedan | Zahedan Flour Mills Complex | Zahedan Kohneh | Zahedan Terminal | Zaherabad | Zahrab | Zahrabad | Zal Shahr | Zamin Band | Zamin Bandan | Zamin Gholam Ali | Zamin Sukadin | Zaminan | Zaminkan | Zangian | Zangik | Zarabad | Zarabad | Zaragi | Zaran Mandi | Zarbar | Zarchak | Zard | Zardabad | Zardan | Zardari | Zardban | Zardian | Zardin Gar | Zardin Gar | Zardin Kahir | Zarkhoshk | Zatan Vari | Zavar | Zayik | Zebri Bug | Zebring | Zehak | Zehak | Zeh-e Ruzehi | Zehlenfan | Zeraqap | Zeyi | Zeyi | Zeynalabad | Zhalehi | Ziai | Ziar | Ziarat Chah | Ziarat Jah | Ziarat Konar | Ziarat | Ziarat | Ziarat | Ziarat | Ziarat | Ziarat | Ziarat | Ziarat | Ziaratgah | Ziaratgah | Zibadak | Zimadan | Zindan | Zir Bandar | Zir Daj | Zirakabad | Zirdan | Zirdan | Zirkeyk | Zirogdan | Ziruki-ye Gowhar Kuh | Ziyan | Ziyarat-e Miromar | Zoberan Dan | Zohanru | Zohian | Zohrekan | Zonnar | Zorrati | Zu ol Faqari | Zurabad | Zurabad | Zurabad-e Salari
