= Shahid Qalanbar =

Shahid Qalanbar شهيدقلنبر
- Village
- Country: Iran
- Province: Sistan and Baluchestan
- County: Khash
- Bakhsh: Central
- Rural District: Poshtkuh

Population (2006)
  - Total: 451
- Time zone: UTC+3:30 (IRST)
  - Summer (DST): UTC+4:30 (IRDT)

Shahid Qalanbar (Persian: شهيدقلنبر, also Romanized as Shahīd Qalanbar) is a village in Poshtkuh Rural District, in the Central District of Khash County, Sistan and Baluchestan Province, Iran. At the 2006 census, its population was 451, in 81 families.
