= Bulani =

Bulani بولاني
- Village
- Location within Iran
- Coordinates: 28°32′00″N 61°24′00″E
- Country: Iran
- Province: Sistan and Baluchestan
- County: Khash
- Bakhsh: Central
- Rural District: Sangan

Population (2006)
  - Total: 105
- Time zone: UTC+3:30 (IRST)
  - Summer (DST): UTC+4:30 (IRDT)

Bulani (Persian: بولاني, also Romanized as Būlānī) is a village in Sangan Rural District, in the Central District of Khash County, Sistan and Baluchestan Province, Iran. At the 2006 census, its population was 105, in 30 families.
