= Ney Padan =

Ney Padan ني پدان
- Village
- Location within Iran
- Coordinates: 27°51′19″N 60°45′44″E
- Country: Iran
- Province: Sistan and Baluchestan
- County: Khash
- Bakhsh: Central
- Rural District: Karvandar

Population (2006)
  - Total: 220
- Time zone: UTC+3:30 (IRST)
  - Summer (DST): UTC+4:30 (IRDT)

Ney Padan (Persian: ني پدان, also Romanized as Ney Padān; also known as Nīfdān) is a village in Karvandar Rural District, in the Central District of Khash County, Sistan and Baluchestan Province, Iran. At the 2006 census, its population was 220, in 46 families.
