= Kahnan Kash-e Bala =

Kahnan Kash-e Bala کهنان کش بالا
- Village
- Country: Iran
- Province: Sistan and Baluchestan
- County: Chabahar
- Bakhsh: Dashtiari
- Rural District: Bahu Kalat

Population (2006)
  - Total: 138
- Time zone: UTC+3:30 (IRST)
  - Summer (DST): UTC+4:30 (IRDT)

Kahnan Kash-e Bala (Persian: کهنان کش بالا, also Romanized as Kahnān Kash-e Bālā) is a village in Bahu Kalat Rural District, Dashtiari District, Chabahar County, Sistan and Baluchestan Province, Iran. At the 2006 census, its population was 138, in 27 families.
