= Espetk-e Hajji Gholam =

Espetk-e Hajji Gholam اسپتك حاجي غلام
- Village
- Location within Iran
- Coordinates: 28°36′00″N 61°21′00″E
- Country: Iran
- Province: Sistan and Baluchestan
- County: Khash
- Bakhsh: Central
- Rural District: Sangan

Population (2006)
  - Total: 190
- Time zone: UTC+3:30 (IRST)
  - Summer (DST): UTC+4:30 (IRDT)

Espetk-e Hajji Gholam (Persian: اسپتك حاجي غلام, also Romanized as Espetk-e Ḩājjī Gholām; also known as Espetk-e Pā’īn) is a village in Sangan Rural District, in the Central District of Khash County, Sistan and Baluchestan Province, Iran. At the 2006 census, its population was 190, in 50 families.
