= Gol Shir =

Gol Shir گل شير
- Village
- Location within Iran
- Coordinates: 27°44′36″N 60°53′17″E
- Country: Iran
- Province: Sistan and Baluchestan
- County: Khash
- Bakhsh: Central
- Rural District: Karvandar

Population (2006)
  - Total: 32
- Time zone: UTC+3:30 (IRST)
  - Summer (DST): UTC+4:30 (IRDT)

Gol Shir (Persian: گل شير, also Romanized as Gol Shīr) is a village in Karvandar Rural District, in the Central District of Khash County, Sistan and Baluchestan Province, Iran. At the 2006 census, its population was 32, in 7 families.
