= Sorkh Degar =

Sorkh Degar سرخ دگار
- Village
- Location within Iran
- Coordinates: 27°40′32″N 60°59′22″E
- Country: Iran
- Province: Sistan and Baluchestan
- County: Khash
- Bakhsh: Irandegan
- Rural District: Kahnuk

Population (2006)
  - Total: 16
- Time zone: UTC+3:30 (IRST)
  - Summer (DST): UTC+4:30 (IRDT)

Sorkh Degar (Persian: سرخ دگار, also Romanized as Sorkh Degār; also known as Sorkh Dagān, Sorkh Degāl, Sorkh Dekāl, and Sorkh Dogān) is a village in Kahnuk Rural District, Irandegan District, Khash County, Sistan and Baluchestan Province, Iran. At the 2006 census, its population was 16, in 5 families.
