= Zahrab =

Zahrab زهراب
- Village
- Location within Iran
- Coordinates: 25°39′18″N 60°51′39″E
- Country: Iran
- Province: Sistan and Baluchestan
- County: Chabahar
- Bakhsh: Central
- Rural District: Pir Sohrab

Population (2006)
  - Total: 248
- Time zone: UTC+3:30 (IRST)
  - Summer (DST): UTC+4:30 (IRDT)

Zahrab (Persian: زهراب, also Romanized as Zahrāb and Z̧ahrāb; also known as Dahr Āb and Zūhrāb) is a village in Pir Sohrab Rural District, in the Central District of Chabahar County, Sistan and Baluchestan Province, Iran. At the 2006 census, its population was 248, in 49 families.
