= Zirkeyk =

Zirkeyk زيركيك
- Village
- Location within Iran
- Coordinates: 27°33′40″N 61°02′36″E
- Country: Iran
- Province: Sistan and Baluchestan
- County: Khash
- Bakhsh: Irandegan
- Rural District: Irandegan

Population (2006)
  - Total: 173
- Time zone: UTC+3:30 (IRST)
  - Summer (DST): UTC+4:30 (IRDT)

Zirkeyk (Persian: زيركيك, also Romanized as Zīrkeyk; also known as Ganzerīg, Genizī Zīrīk, and Zīnkīk) is a village in Irandegan Rural District, Irandegan District, Khash County, Sistan and Baluchestan Province, Iran. At the 2006 census, its population was 173, in 35 families.
