= Sihaki =

Sihaki سيهكي
- Village
- Location within Iran
- Coordinates: 28°36′46″N 61°01′24″E
- Country: Iran
- Province: Sistan and Baluchestan
- County: Khash
- Bakhsh: Nukabad
- Rural District: Taftan-e Jonubi

Population (2006)
  - Total: 64
- Time zone: UTC+3:30 (IRST)
  - Summer (DST): UTC+4:30 (IRDT)

Sihaki (Persian: سيهكي, also Romanized as Sīhakī and Sīḩakī) is a village in Taftan-e Jonubi Rural District, Nukabad District, Khash County, Sistan and Baluchestan Province, Iran. At the 2006 census, its population was 64, in 12 families.
