= Mowladad Zehi =

Mowladad Zehi مولادادزهي
- Village
- Location within Iran
- Coordinates: 25°34′52″N 61°08′18″E
- Country: Iran
- Province: Sistan and Baluchestan
- County: Chabahar
- Bakhsh: Polan
- Rural District: Polan

Population (2006)
  - Total: 196
- Time zone: UTC+3:30 (IRST)
  - Summer (DST): UTC+4:30 (IRDT)

Mowladad Zehi (Persian: مولادادزهي, also Romanized as Mowlādād Zehī; also known as Mowlā Dād Bāzār) is a village in Polan Rural District, Polan District, Chabahar County, Sistan and Baluchestan Province, Iran. At the 2006 census, its population was 196, in 38 families.
