= Poshteh-ye Kamal =

Poshteh-ye Kamal پشته كمال
- Village
- Location within Iran
- Coordinates: 28°19′39″N 61°25′08″E
- Country: Iran
- Province: Sistan and Baluchestan
- County: Khash
- Bakhsh: Central
- Rural District: Poshtkuh

Population (2006)
  - Total: 328
- Time zone: UTC+3:30 (IRST)
  - Summer (DST): UTC+4:30 (IRDT)

Poshteh-ye Kamal (Persian: پشته كمال, also Romanized as Poshteh-ye Kamāl; also known as Posht Kamāl) is a village in Poshtkuh Rural District, in the Central District of Khash County, Sistan and Baluchestan Province, Iran. At the 2006 census, its population was 328, in 56 families.
