= Kiksuch =

Kiksuch کيک سوچ
- Village
- Location within Iran
- Coordinates: 25°46′00″N 61°37′00″E
- Country: Iran
- Province: Sistan and Baluchestan
- County: Chabahar
- Bakhsh: Dashtiari
- Rural District: Bahu Kalat

Population (2006)
  - Total: 1,612
- Time zone: UTC+3:30 (IRST)
  - Summer (DST): UTC+4:30 (IRDT)

Kiksuch (Persian: کيک سوچ, also Romanized as Kīksūch; also known as Keksūch) is a village in Bahu Kalat Rural District, Dashtiari District, Chabahar County, Sistan and Baluchestan Province, Iran. At the 2006 census, its population was 1,612, in 289 families.
