= Mosafer Zehi =

Mosafer Zehi مسافرزهي
- Village
- Location within Iran
- Coordinates: 25°35′09″N 61°08′16″E
- Country: Iran
- Province: Sistan and Baluchestan
- County: Chabahar
- Bakhsh: Polan
- Rural District: Polan

Population (2006)
  - Total: 418
- Time zone: UTC+3:30 (IRST)
  - Summer (DST): UTC+4:30 (IRDT)

Mosafer Zehi (Persian: مسافرزهي, also Romanized as Mosāfer Zehī; also known as Mosāfer Zā’ī and Mosāferzī) is a village in Polan Rural District, Polan District, Chabahar County, Sistan and Baluchestan Province, Iran. At the 2006 census, its population was 418, in 76 families.
