= Dizi, Sistan and Baluchestan =

Dizi ديزي
- Village
- Location within Iran
- Coordinates: 25°26′34″N 61°12′54″E
- Country: Iran
- Province: Sistan and Baluchestan
- County: Chabahar
- Bakhsh: Dashtiari
- Rural District: Negur

Population (2006)
  - Total: 577
- Time zone: UTC+3:30 (IRST)
  - Summer (DST): UTC+4:30 (IRDT)

Dizi (Persian: ديزي, also Romanized as Dīzī) is a village in Negur Rural District, Dashtiari District, Chabahar County, Sistan and Baluchestan Province, Iran. At the 2006 census, its population was 577, in 116 families.
