= Tareh-ye Darkhatkari Chesh =

Tareh-ye Darkhatkari Chesh طرح درختكاري چش
- Village
- Country: Iran
- Province: Sistan and Baluchestan
- County: Chabahar
- Bakhsh: Dashtiari
- Rural District: Bahu Kalat

Population (2006)
  - Total: 212
- Time zone: UTC+3:30 (IRST)
  - Summer (DST): UTC+4:30 (IRDT)

Tareh-ye Darkhatkari Chesh (Persian: طرح درختكاري چش, also Romanized as Ţareḩ-ye Darkhatkārī Chesh) is a village in Bahu Kalat Rural District, Dashtiari District, Chabahar County, Sistan and Baluchestan Province, Iran. At the 2006 census, its population was 212, in 45 families.
