= Shundeh =

Shundeh شونده
- Village
- Location within Iran
- Coordinates: 28°34′03″N 61°11′12″E
- Country: Iran
- Province: Sistan and Baluchestan
- County: Khash
- Bakhsh: Central
- Rural District: Sangan

Population (2006)
  - Total: 95
- Time zone: UTC+3:30 (IRST)
  - Summer (DST): UTC+4:30 (IRDT)

Shundeh (Persian: شونده, also Romanized as Shūndeh; also known as Shūmdeh) is a village in Sangan Rural District, in the Central District of Khash County, Sistan and Baluchestan Province, Iran. At the 2006 census, its population was 95, in 20 families.
