= Khan Bibi =

Khan Bibi خان بي بي
- Village
- Location within Iran
- Coordinates: 28°09′54″N 61°09′55″E
- Country: Iran
- Province: Sistan and Baluchestan
- County: Khash
- Bakhsh: Central
- Rural District: Kuh Sefid

Population (2006)
  - Total: 30
- Time zone: UTC+3:30 (IRST)
  - Summer (DST): UTC+4:30 (IRDT)

Khan Bibi (Persian: خان بي بي, also Romanized as Khān Bībī) is a village in Kuh Sefid Rural District, in the Central District of Khash County, Sistan and Baluchestan Province, Iran. At the 2006 census, its population was 30, in 7 families.
