= Mehrab Bazar =

Mehrab Bazar مهراب بازار
- Village
- Country: Iran
- Province: Sistan and Baluchestan
- County: Chabahar
- Bakhsh: Central
- Rural District: Pir Sohrab

Population (2006)
  - Total: 36
- Time zone: UTC+3:30 (IRST)
  - Summer (DST): UTC+4:30 (IRDT)

Mehrab Bazar (Persian: مهراب بازار, also Romanized as Mehrāb Bāzār) is a village in Pir Sohrab Rural District, in the Central District of Chabahar County, Sistan and Baluchestan Province, Iran. At the 2006 census, its population was 36, in 7 families.
