= Genzerig =

Genzerig گنزريگ
- Village
- Location within Iran
- Coordinates: 27°33′00″N 61°01′00″E
- Country: Iran
- Province: Sistan and Baluchestan
- County: Khash
- Bakhsh: Irandegan
- Rural District: Irandegan

Population (2006)
  - Total: 72
- Time zone: UTC+3:30 (IRST)
  - Summer (DST): UTC+4:30 (IRDT)

Genzerig (Persian: گنزريگ, also Romanized as Genzerīg; also known as Ganīzī Zīrīk, Ganzerīk, Ganzrīk, and Genzerīk) is a village in Irandegan Rural District, Irandegan District, Khash County, Sistan and Baluchestan Province, Iran. At the 2006 census, its population was 72, in 14 families.
