= Hajji Abdollah Bazar =

Hajji Abdollah Bazar حاجي عبدالله بازار
- Village
- Location within Iran
- Coordinates: 25°49′20″N 61°02′43″E
- Country: Iran
- Province: Sistan and Baluchestan
- County: Chabahar
- Bakhsh: Central
- Rural District: Pir Sohrab

Population (2006)
  - Total: 174
- Time zone: UTC+3:30 (IRST)
  - Summer (DST): UTC+4:30 (IRDT)

Hajji Abdollah Bazar (Persian: حاجي عبدالله بازار, also Romanized as Ḩājjī ʿAbdollah Bāzār; also known as Ḩājīabdollah) is a village in Pir Sohrab Rural District, in the Central District of Chabahar County, Sistan and Baluchestan Province, Iran. At the 2006 census, its population was 174, in 42 families.
