= Richkan =

Richkan ريچكان
- Village
- Location within Iran
- Coordinates: 27°49′54″N 60°46′10″E
- Country: Iran
- Province: Sistan and Baluchestan
- County: Khash
- Bakhsh: Central
- Rural District: Karvandar

Population (2006)
  - Total: 22
- Time zone: UTC+3:30 (IRST)
  - Summer (DST): UTC+4:30 (IRDT)

Richkan (Persian: ريچكان, also Romanized as Rīchkān) is a village in Karvandar Rural District, in the Central District of Khash County, Sistan and Baluchestan Province, Iran. At the 2006 census, its population was 22, in 5 families.
