= Varedan =

Varedan واردان
- Village
- Location within Iran
- Coordinates: 27°34′59″N 60°59′06″E
- Country: Iran
- Province: Sistan and Baluchestan
- County: Khash
- Bakhsh: Irandegan
- Rural District: Irandegan

Population (2006)
  - Total: 184
- Time zone: UTC+3:30 (IRST)
  - Summer (DST): UTC+4:30 (IRDT)

Varedan (Persian: واردان, also Romanized as Vāredān and Vārdān; also known as Vārīdān and Yārīdān) is a village in Irandegan Rural District, Irandegan District, Khash County, Sistan and Baluchestan Province, Iran. At the 2006 census, its population was 184, in 46 families.
