= Halow Bazar =

Halow Bazar هالو بازار
- Village
- Location within Iran
- Coordinates: 25°38′18″N 60°58′50″E
- Country: Iran
- Province: Sistan and Baluchestan
- County: Chabahar
- Bakhsh: Central
- Rural District: Pir Sohrab

Population (2006)
  - Total: 53
- Time zone: UTC+3:30 (IRST)
  - Summer (DST): UTC+4:30 (IRDT)

Halow Bazar (Persian: هالو بازار, also Romanized as Hālow Bāzār and Hālowbāzār) is a village in Pir Sohrab Rural District, in the Central District of Chabahar County, Sistan and Baluchestan Province, Iran. At the 2006 census, its population was 53, in 9 families.
