= Teymurabad =

Teymurabad (Persian: تيموراباد) may refer to:

- Teymurabad, Golestan
- Teymurabad, Lorestan

- Teymurabad, Pol-e Dokhtar
- Teymurabad, Selseleh

- Teymurabad, Razavi Khorasan
- Teymurabad, Sistan and Baluchestan
- Teymurabad, West Azerbaijan
- Teymurabad Rural District
- Teymurabad District
