= Siyadan =

Village in Sistan and Baluchestan province, Iran

Siyadan Persian: صیادان
- Village
- Location within Iran
- Coordinates: 30°56′12″N 61°17′36″E
- Country: Iran
- Province: Sistan and Baluchestan
- County: Hamun
- District: Teymurabad
- Rural District: Kuh-e Khajeh

Population (2016)
  - Total: 408
- Time zone: UTC+3:30 (IRST)

Siyadan (Persian: صیادان) (Note: Formerly Siyadan-e Sofla (صيادان سفلي)) is a village in, and the capital of, Kuh-e Khajeh Rural District of Teymurabad District, Hamun County, Sistan and Baluchestan province, Iran.

== Demographics ==
=== Population ===
At the time of the 2006 National Census, the village's population was 299 in 79 households, when it was Siyadan-e Sofla in the former Shib Ab District of Zabol County. The following census in 2011 counted 187 people in 58 households. The 2016 census measured the population of the village as 408 people in 132 households, by which time the district had been separated from the county in the establishment of Hamun County. The rural district was transferred to the new Teymurabad District, and the name of the village was changed to Siyadan. It was the most populous village in its rural district.
