= Eslamabad, Hamun =

Village in Sistan and Baluchestan province, Iran

Eslamabad Persian: اسلام‌آباد
- Village
- Location within Iran
- Coordinates: 30°46′34″N 61°23′47″E
- Country: Iran
- Province: Sistan and Baluchestan
- County: Hamun
- District: Central
- Rural District: Lutak

Population (2016)
  - Total: 2,187
- Time zone: UTC+3:30 (IRST)

Eslamabad (Persian: اسلام‌آباد) is a village in Lutak Rural District of the Central District of Hamun County, Sistan and Baluchestan province, Iran.

== Demographics ==
=== Population ===
At the time of the 2006 National Census, the village's population was 2,926 in 497 households, when it was in the former Shib Ab District of Zabol County. The following census in 2011 counted 2,460 people in 553 households. The 2016 census measured the population of the village as 2,187 people in 522 households, by which time the district had been separated from the county in the establishment of Hamun County. The rural district was transferred to the new Central District. It was the most populous village in its rural district.
