= Zhalehi =

Village in Sistan and Baluchestan province, Iran

Zhalehi Persian: ژاله‌ای
- Village
- Location within Iran
- Coordinates: 30°59′53″N 61°33′52″E
- Country: Iran
- Province: Sistan and Baluchestan
- County: Zabol
- District: Karbasak
- Rural District: Zhalehi

Population (2016)
  - Total: 1,077
- Time zone: UTC+3:30 (IRST)

Zhalehi (Persian: ژاله‌ای) is a village in, and the capital of, Zhalehi Rural District of Karbasak District, Zabol County, Sistan and Baluchestan province, Iran.

== Demographics ==
=== Population ===
At the time of the 2006 National Census, the village's population was 1,291 in 334 households, when it was in Bonjar Rural District of the Central District. The following census in 2011 counted 1,573 people in 395 households. The 2016 census measured the population of the village as 1,077 people in 346 households.

After the census, Zhalehi was separated from the district in the formation of Karbasak District and transferred to the new Zhalehi Rural District.
