= Firuzehi =

Village in Sistan and Baluchestan province, Iran

Firuzehi Persian: فیروزه‌ای
- Village
- Location within Iran
- Coordinates: 30°57′44″N 61°28′55″E
- Country: Iran
- Province: Sistan and Baluchestan
- County: Hamun
- District: Central
- Rural District: Mohammadabad

Population (2016)
  - Total: 1,340
- Time zone: UTC+3:30 (IRST)

Firuzehi (Persian: فیروزه‌ای) is a village in Mohammadabad Rural District of the Central District of Hamun County, Sistan and Baluchestan province, Iran.

== Demographics ==
=== Population ===
At the time of the 2006 National Census, the village's population was 1,121 in 275 households, when it was in the former Shib Ab District of Zabol County. The following census in 2011 counted 1,171 people in 310 households. The 2016 census measured the population of the village as 1,340 people in 394 households, by which time the district had been separated from the county in the establishment of Hamun County. The rural district was transferred to the new Central District. It was the most populous village in its rural district.
