= Lutak, Sistan and Baluchestan =

Village in Sistan and Baluchestan province, Iran

Lutak Persian: لوتک
- Village
- Location within Iran
- Coordinates: 30°46′00″N 61°24′09″E
- Country: Iran
- Province: Sistan and Baluchestan
- County: Hamun
- District: Central
- Rural District: Lutak

Population (2016)
  - Total: 977
- Time zone: UTC+3:30 (IRST)

Lutak (Persian: لوتک) is a village in, and the capital of, Lutak Rural District of the Central District of Hamun County, Sistan and Baluchestan province, Iran.

== Demographics ==
=== Population ===
At the time of the 2006 National Census, the village's population was 981 in 191 households, when it was in the former Shib Ab District of Zabol County. The following census in 2011 counted 1,158 people in 257 households. The 2016 census measured the population of the village as 977 people in 248 households, by which time the district had been separated from the county in the establishment of Hamun County. The rural district was transferred to the new Central District.
