= Deh-e Esmail Qanbar =

Village in Sistan and Baluchestan province, Iran

Deh-e Esmail Qanbar Persian: روستای اسماعیل قنبر
- Village
- Location within Iran
- Coordinates: 30°55′46″N 61°23′11″E
- Country: Iran
- Province: Sistan and Baluchestan
- County: Hamun
- District: Teymurabad
- Rural District: Teymurabad

Population (2016)
  - Total: 527
- Time zone: UTC+3:30 (IRST)

Deh-e Esmail Qanbar (Persian: روستای اسماعیل قنبر) is a village in Teymurabad Rural District of Teymurabad District, Hamun County, Sistan and Baluchestan province, Iran.

== Demographics ==
=== Population ===
At the time of the 2006 National Census, the village's population was 585 in 133 households, when it was in the former Shib Ab District of Zabol County. The following census in 2011 counted 607 people in 147 households. The 2016 census measured the population of the village as 527 people in 150 households. It was the most populous village in its rural district, by which time the district had been separated from the county in the establishment of Hamun County. The rural district was transferred to the new Teymurabad District.
