= Karbasak =

Village in Sistan and Baluchestan province, Iran

Karbasak Persian: کرباسک
- Village
- Location within Iran
- Coordinates: 30°58′46″N 61°30′11″E
- Country: Iran
- Province: Sistan and Baluchestan
- County: Zabol
- District: Karbasak
- Rural District: Karbasak

Population (2016)
  - Total: 1,313
- Time zone: UTC+3:30 (IRST)

Karbasak (Persian: کرباسک) is a village in Karbasak Rural District of Karbasak District, Zabol County, Sistan and Baluchestan province, Iran, serving as capital of both the district and the rural district.

== Demographics ==
=== Population ===
At the time of the 2006 National Census, the village's population was 1,183 in 290 households, when it was in Bonjar Rural District of the Central District. The following census in 2011 counted 1,429 people in 392 households. The 2016 census measured the population of the village as 1,313 people in 369 households.

After the census, Karbasak was separated from the district in the establishment of Karbasak District and transferred to the new Karbasak Rural District.
