= Heydarabad, Zabol =

Village in Sistan and Baluchestan province, Iran

Heydarabad Persian: حیدرآباد
- Village
- Location within Iran
- Coordinates: 31°05′24″N 61°33′26″E
- Country: Iran
- Province: Sistan and Baluchestan
- County: Zabol
- District: Central
- Rural District: Heydarabad

Population (2016)
  - Total: 740
- Time zone: UTC+3:30 (IRST)

Heydarabad (Persian: حیدرآباد) is a village in, and the capital of, Heydarabad Rural District of the Central District of Zabol County, Sistan and Baluchestan province, Iran.

== Demographics ==
=== Population ===
At the time of the 2006 National Census, the village's population was 709 in 182 households, when it was in Bonjar Rural District. The following census in 2011 counted 745 people in 204 households. The 2016 census measured the population of the village as 740 people in 217 households.

After the census, Heydarabad was transferred to Heydarabad Rural District created in the district.
