= Tappeh Daz =

Village in Sistan and Baluchestan province, Iran

Tappeh Daz Persian: تپه دز
- Village
- Location within Iran
- Coordinates: 31°00′16″N 61°35′33″E
- Country: Iran
- Province: Sistan and Baluchestan
- County: Zabol
- District: Central
- Rural District: Bonjar

Population (2016)
  - Total: 2,335
- Time zone: UTC+3:30 (IRST)

Tappeh Daz (Persian: تپه دز) is a village in Bonjar Rural District of the Central District of Zabol County, Sistan and Baluchestan province, Iran.

== Demographics ==
=== Population ===
At the time of the 2006 National Census, the village's population was 1,848 in 358 households. The following census in 2011 counted 2,221 people in 491 households. The 2016 census measured the population of the village as 2,335 people in 551 households. It was the most populous village in its rural district.
