= Teymurabad, Sistan and Baluchestan =

Village in Sistan and Baluchestan province, Iran

Teymurabad Persian: تیمورآباد
- Village
- Location within Iran
- Coordinates: 30°56′21″N 61°23′00″E
- Country: Iran
- Province: Sistan and Baluchestan
- County: Hamun
- District: Teymurabad
- Rural District: Teymurabad

Population (2016)
  - Total: 399
- Time zone: UTC+3:30 (IRST)

Teymurabad (Persian: تیمورآباد) is a village in Teymurabad Rural District of Teymurabad District, Hamun County, Sistan and Baluchestan province, Iran, serving as capital of both the district and rural district.

== Demographics ==
=== Population ===
At the time of the 2006 National Census, the village's population was 351 in 98 households, when it was in the former Shib Ab District of Zabol County. The following census in 2011 counted 475 people in 108 households. The 2016 census measured the population of the village as 399 people in 105 households, by which time the district had been separated from the county in the establishment of Hamun County. The rural district was transferred to the new Teymurabad District.
