= Ali Akbar, Sistan and Baluchestan =

City in Sistan and Baluchestan province, Iran

Ali Akbar Persian: علي اکبر
- City
- Location within Iran
- Coordinates: 30°56′19″N 61°19′29″E
- Country: Iran
- Province: Sistan and Baluchestan
- County: Hamun
- District: Central

Population (2016)
  - Total: 4,779
- Time zone: UTC+3:30 (IRST)

Ali Akbar (Persian: علي اکبر) (Note: Formerly Shahrak-e Ali Akbar (شهرک علي اکبر)) is a city in the Central District of Hamun County, Sistan and Baluchestan province, Iran.

== Demographics ==
=== Population ===
At the time of the 2006 National Census, the population was 4,681 in 1,121 households, when it was the village of Shahrak-e Ali Akbar in Kuh-e Khajeh Rural District of the former Shib Ab District of Zabol County. The following census in 2011 counted 4,551 people in 1,253 households, by which time the village had been elevated to city status as Ali Akbar. The 2016 census measured the population of the city as 4,779 people in 1,392 households, when the district had been separated from the county in the establishment of Hamun County. The rural district was transferred to the new Teymurabad District, and Ali Akbar was transferred to the new Central District.
