= Kak Kahzad Castle =

Kak Kahzad Castle may refer to:

- Kak Kahzad Castle, Dana, Iran
- Kak Kahzad Castle, Hamun, Iran
