= Seh Kohye Castle =

Iranian national heritage site

Seh Kohye castle
- قلعه سه کوهه
- Interactive map of the Seh Kohye castle area

General information
- Type: Castle
- Location: Hamun County, Iran

Seh Kohye castle (Persian: قلعه سه کوهه) is a historical castle located in Hamun County in Sistan and Baluchestan Province, The longevity of this fortress dates back to the Qajar dynasty.
