= Ramrud Castle =

Castle in Sistan and Baluchestan Province, Iran

Ramrud castle
- قلعه رامرود

General information
- Type: Castle
- Location: Hamun County, Iran

Ramrud castle (Persian: قلعه رامرود) is a historical castle located in Hamun County in Sistan and Baluchestan Province, The longevity of this fortress dates back to the Timurid Empire.
