= Chehel Dokhtaran Castle =

Castle in Sistan and Baluchestan Province, Iran

Chehel Dokhtaran castle
- قلعه چهل دختران

General information
- Type: Castle
- Location: Hamun County, Iran

Chehel Dokhtaran castle (Persian: قلعه چهل دختران) is a historical castle located in Hamun County in Sistan and Baluchestan Province, The longevity of this fortress dates back to the Sasanian Empire.
