= Zhalehi Rural District =

Rural district in Sistan and Baluchestan province, Iran

Zhalehi Rural District Persian: دهستان ژاله‌ای
- Rural District
- Location within Iran
- Coordinates: 31°00′17″N 61°39′12″E
- Country: Iran
- Province: Sistan and Baluchestan
- County: Zabol
- District: Karbasak
- Capital: Zhalehi
- Time zone: UTC+3:30 (IRST)

Zhalehi Rural District (Persian: دهستان ژاله‌ای) is in Karbasak District of Zabol County, Sistan and Baluchestan province, Iran. Its capital is the village of Zhalehi, whose population at the time of the 2016 National Census was 1,077 people in 346 households.

== History ==
After the census, villages of the Central District were separated from it in the formation of Karbasak District, and Zhalehi Rural District was created in the new district.
