= Iranshahr Velayat University =

Public university in Sistan and Baluchestan, Iran

- دانشگاه ولایت
- Type: Public
- Established: 1993
- Location: Iranshahr, Sistan and Baluchestan province, Iran Iran
- Website: https://www.velayat.ac.ir/fa

Iranshahr Velayat University (Persian: دانشگاه ايرانشهر) is a public university located in Iranshahr, Sistan and Baluchestan province, Iran.

According to the 2024 ranking published by the Islamic World Science and Technology Citation and Monitoring Institute (ISC), the university ranked 82nd among universities in Iran.

The University of Velayat in Iranshahr offers more than 50 academic programs in various fields.

== History ==
The institution began operating in 1993 as a teacher-training college affiliated with the University of Sistan and Baluchestan. It initially offered programs in Persian language and literature education, English language and literature education, and mathematics education.

In 2001, it became the Iranshahr Higher Education Center. In 2007, the Higher Education Development Council approved its separation from the University of Sistan and Baluchestan and its conversion into the Iranshahr Higher Education Complex.

In 2010, the Higher Education Development Council granted final approval for the institution to be upgraded to university status under the name University of Velayat.

Since 2008, the university has expanded in several areas. According to the university's official history, the number of faculties increased from one to five, academic programs from seven to 29, student enrollment from 400 to 4,015, and the area of buildings and facilities from 5,000 to 90,000 square metres. The number of academic staff also increased from 15 to more than 110.
