= Timur Castle =

Castle in Sistan and Baluchestan Province, Iran

Timur castle
- قلعه تیمور

General information
- Type: Castle
- Location: Zabol County, Iran
- Renovation cost

Iran National Heritage List
- Official name: Timur Fortress
- Type: Ruins
- Designated: 1966
- Reference no.: 538
- Conservation organization: Cultural Heritage, Handicrafts and Tourism Organization of Iran

Timur castle (Persian: قلعه تیمور) is a historical castle located in Zabol County in Sistan and Baluchestan Province, The longevity of this fortress dates back to the Timurid Empire.
