= Karbasak Rural District =

Rural district in Sistan and Baluchestan province, Iran

Karbasak Rural District Persian: دهستان کرباسک
- Rural District
- Location within Iran
- Coordinates: 30°58′35″N 61°31′08″E
- Country: Iran
- Province: Sistan and Baluchestan
- County: Zabol
- District: Karbasak
- Capital: Karbasak
- Time zone: UTC+3:30 (IRST)

Karbasak Rural District (Persian: دهستان کرباسک) is in Karbasak District of Zabol County, Sistan and Baluchestan province, Iran. Its capital is the village of Karbasak, whose population at the time of the 2016 National Census was 1,313 people in 369 households.

== History ==
After the 2016 census, villages of the Central District were separated from it in the establishment of Karbasak District, and Karbasak Rural District was created in the new district.
