= Kak Kahzad Castle, Hamun =

Castle in Sistan and Baluchestan Province, Iran

Kak Kahzad Castle
- قلعه کک کهزاد

General information
- Type: Castle
- Location: Hamun County, Iran

Kak Kahzad Castle (Persian: قلعه کک کهزاد) is a historical castle located in Hamun County in Sistan and Baluchestan Province, Iran. The longevity of this fortress dates back to the Parthian Empire and Sasanian Empire.
