= Mohammadabad Rural District (Hamun County) =

Rural district in Sistan and Baluchestan province, Iran

Mohammadabad Rural District Persian: دهستان محمدآباد
- Rural District
- Location within Iran
- Coordinates: 30°54′N 61°27′E
- Country: Iran
- Province: Sistan and Baluchestan
- County: Hamun
- District: Central
- Capital: Mohammadabad

Population (2016)
  - Total: 13,526
- Time zone: UTC+3:30 (IRST)

Mohammadabad Rural District (Persian: دهستان محمدآباد) is in the Central District of Hamun County, Sistan and Baluchestan province, Iran. It is administered from the city of Mohammadabad.

== Demographics ==
=== Population ===
At the time of the 2006 National Census, the rural district's population (as a part of the former Shib Ab District of Zabol County) was 14,489 in 3,440 households. There were 13,641 inhabitants in 3,608 households at the following census of 2011. The 2016 census measured the population of the rural district as 13,526 in 3,944 households, by which time the district had been separated from the county in the establishment of Hamun County. The rural district was transferred to the new Central District. The most populous of its 80 villages was Firuzehi, with 1,340 people.
