= Lutak Rural District =

Rural district in Sistan and Baluchestan province, Iran

Lutak Rural District Persian: دهستان لوتک
- Rural District
- Location within Iran
- Coordinates: 30°27′15″N 61°05′01″E
- Country: Iran
- Province: Sistan and Baluchestan
- County: Hamun
- District: Central
- Capital: Lutak

Population (2016)
  - Total: 12,797
- Time zone: UTC+3:30 (IRST)

Lutak Rural District (Persian: دهستان لوتک) is in the Central District of Hamun County, Sistan and Baluchestan province, Iran. Its capital is the village of Lutak.

== Demographics ==
=== Population ===
At the time of the 2006 National Census, the rural district's population (as a part of the former Shib Ab District of Zabol County) was 14,019 in 2,731 households. There were 13,167 inhabitants in 3,033 households at the following census of 2011. The 2016 census measured the population of the rural district as 12,797 in 3,152 households, by which time the district had been separated from the county in the establishment of Hamun County. The rural district was transferred to the new Central District. The most populous of its 64 villages was Eslamabad, with 2,187 people.
