= Rostam Castle =

Castle in Hamun County, Sistan and Baluchestan Province, Iran

- قلعه رستم
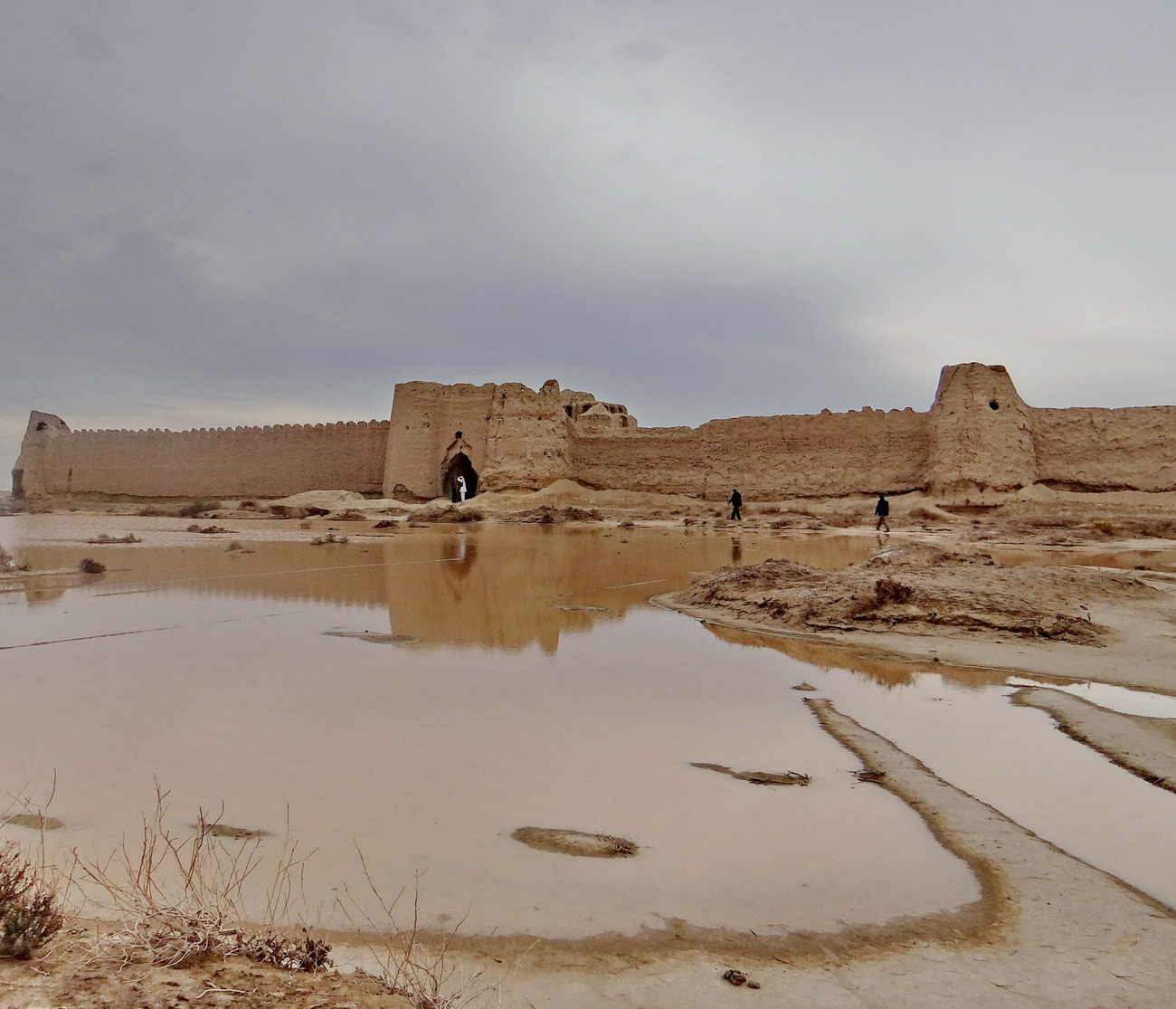
- Interactive map of the Rostam Castle area

General information
- Type: Castle
- Architectural style: Iranian architecture
- Location: Hamun County, Iran
- Coordinates: 30.5570°N 61.2471°E

Rostam Castle, Nain – also referred to as Haozdar Fort – is a castle in Hamun County, Iran, and is one of the attractions of Sistan and Baluchestan Province. This castle was built by the Safavid dynasty-Seljuq dynasty.

== Gallery ==
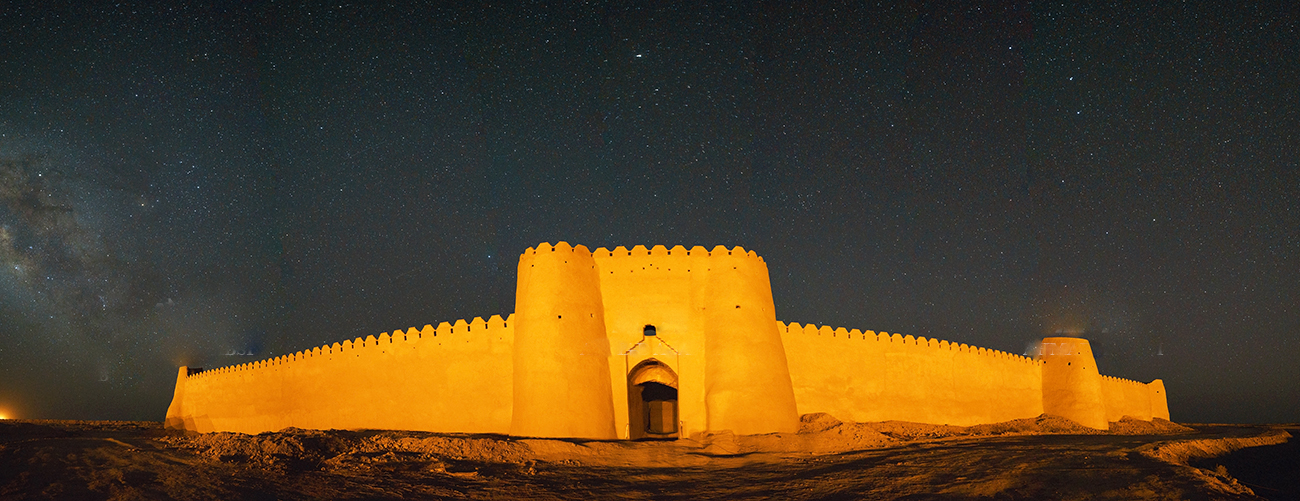

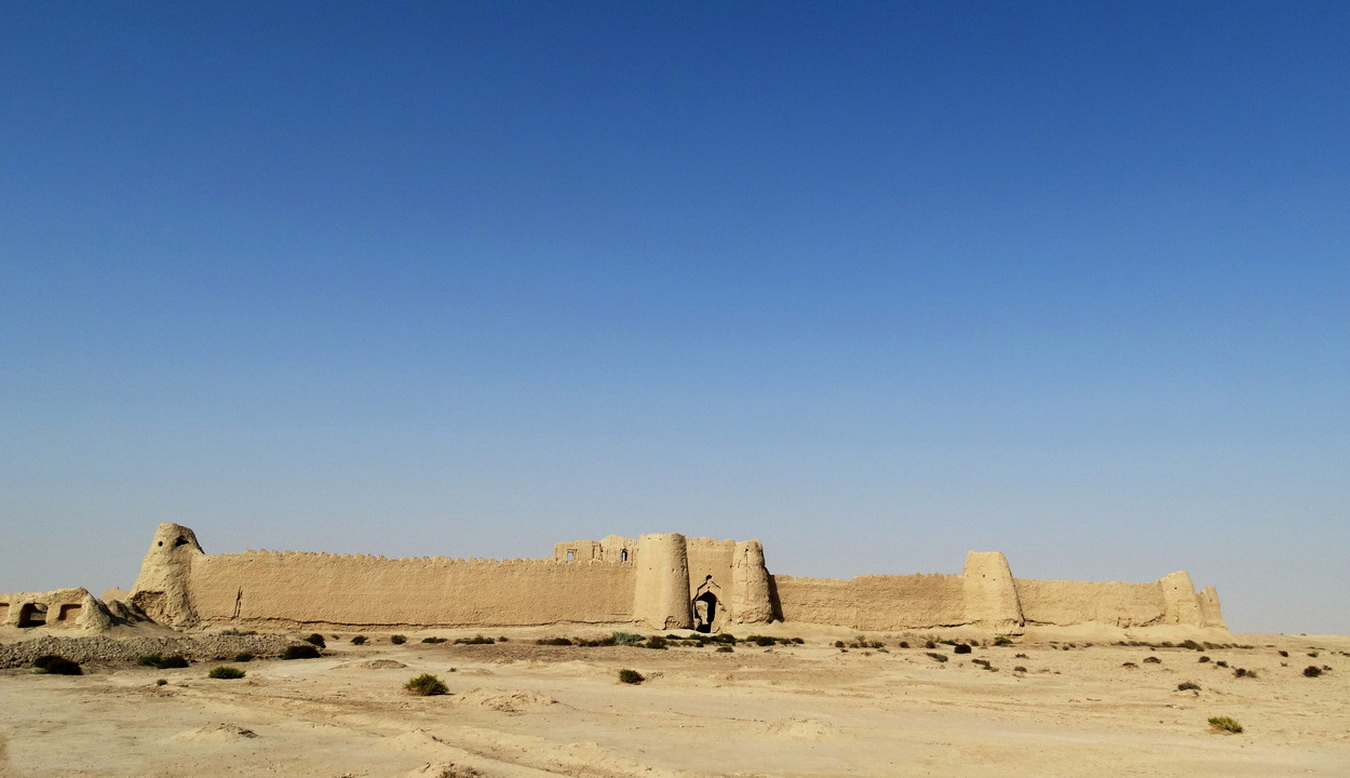

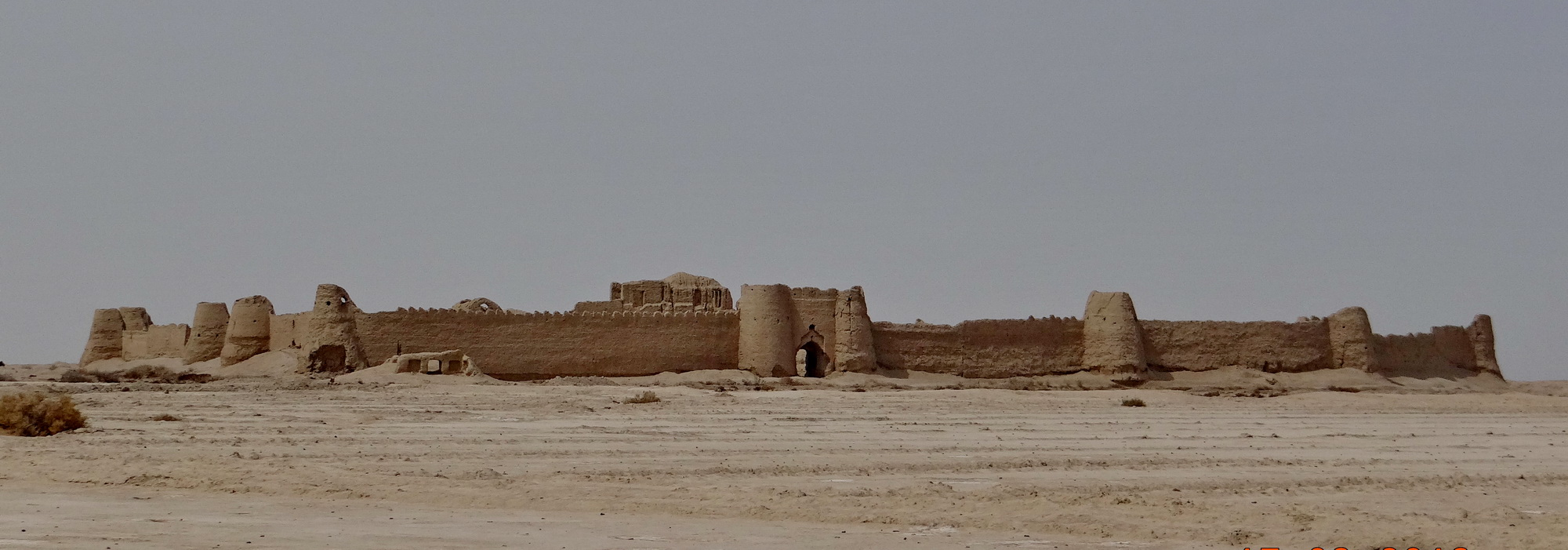

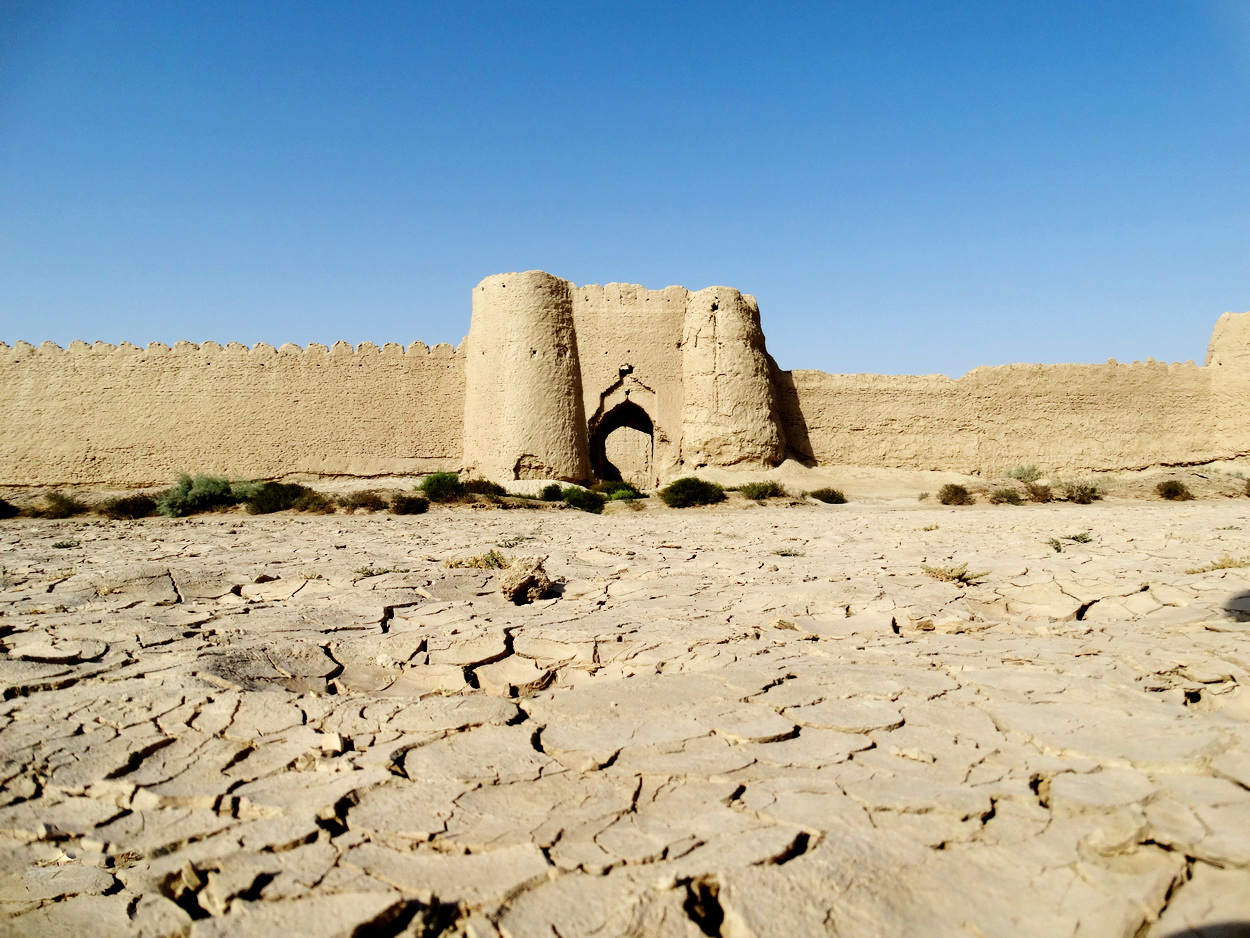

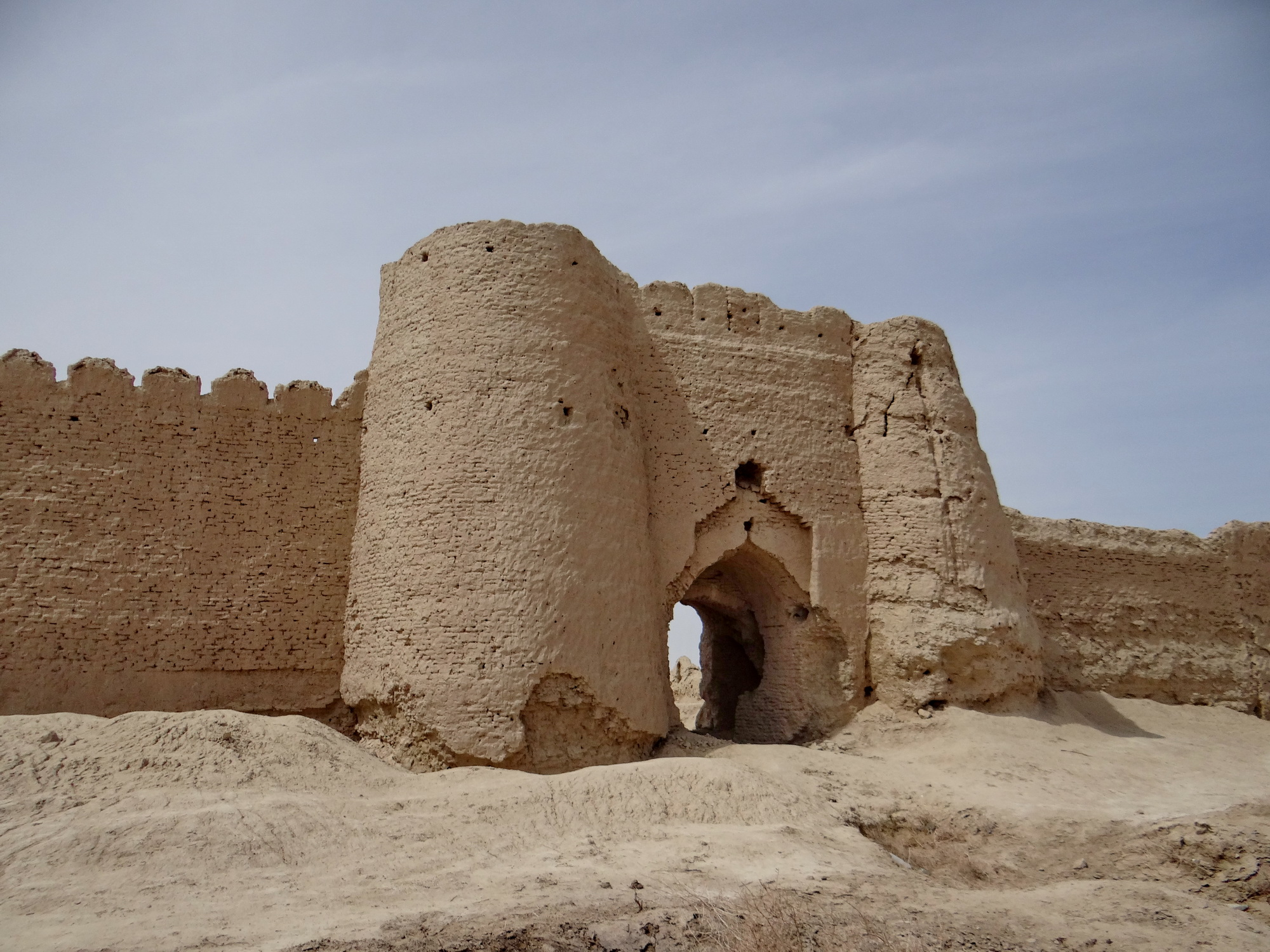

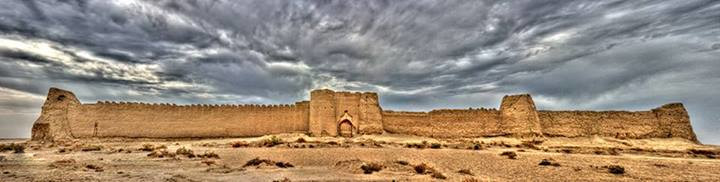

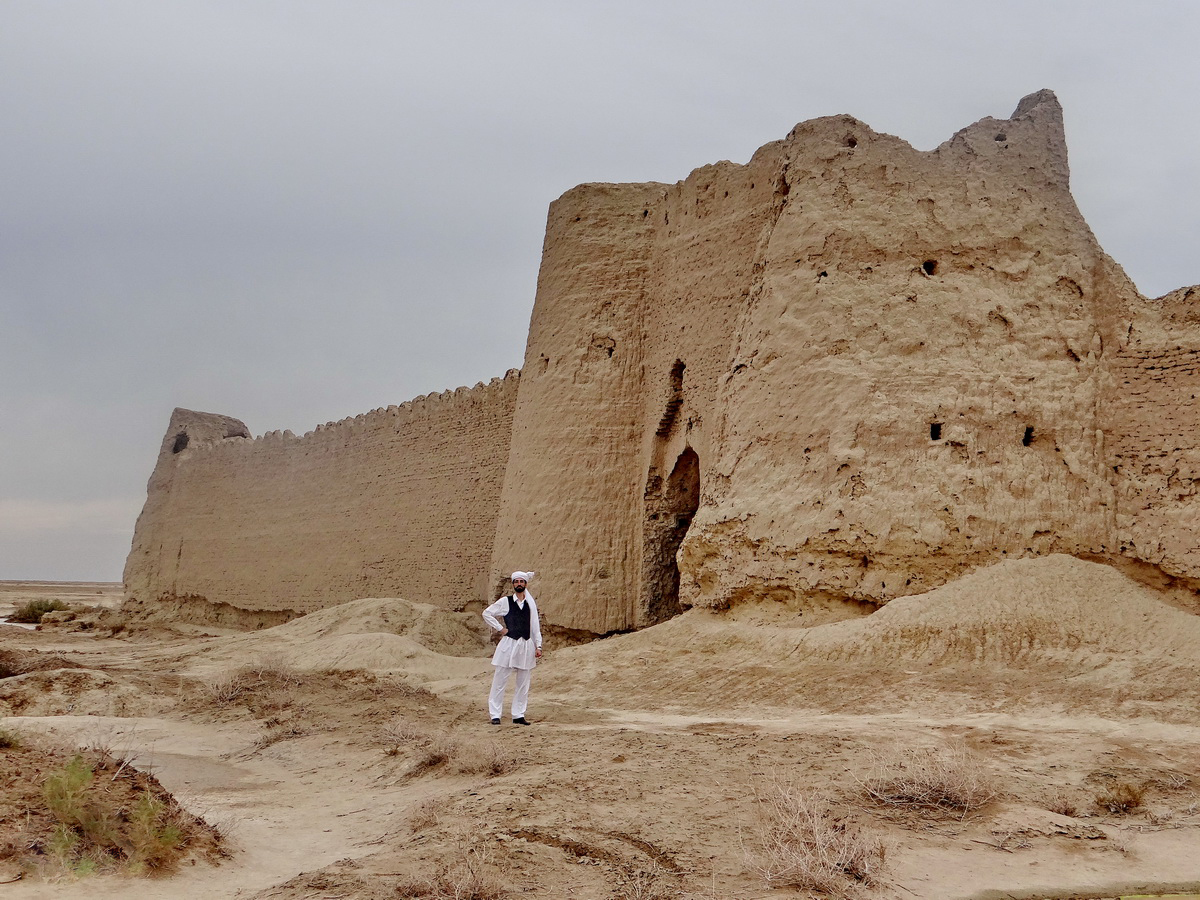

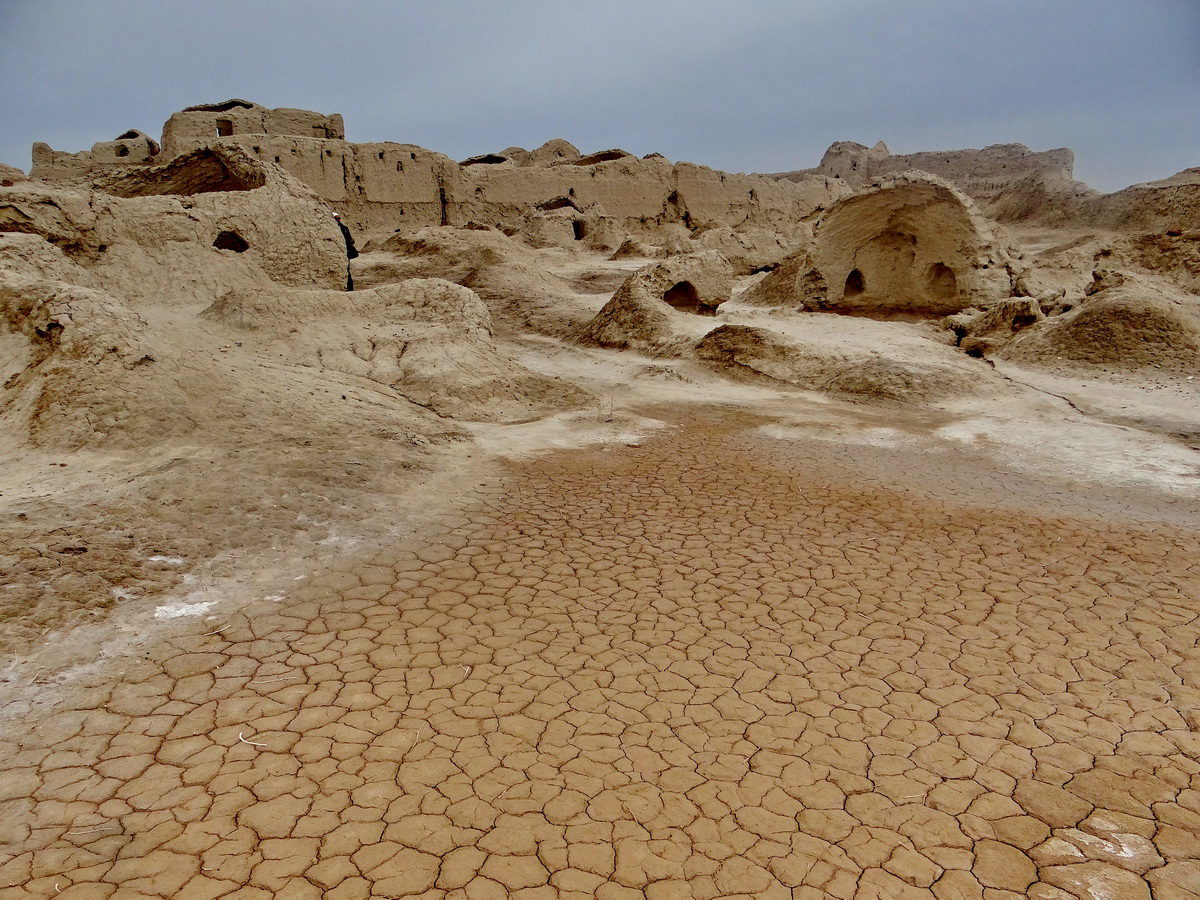

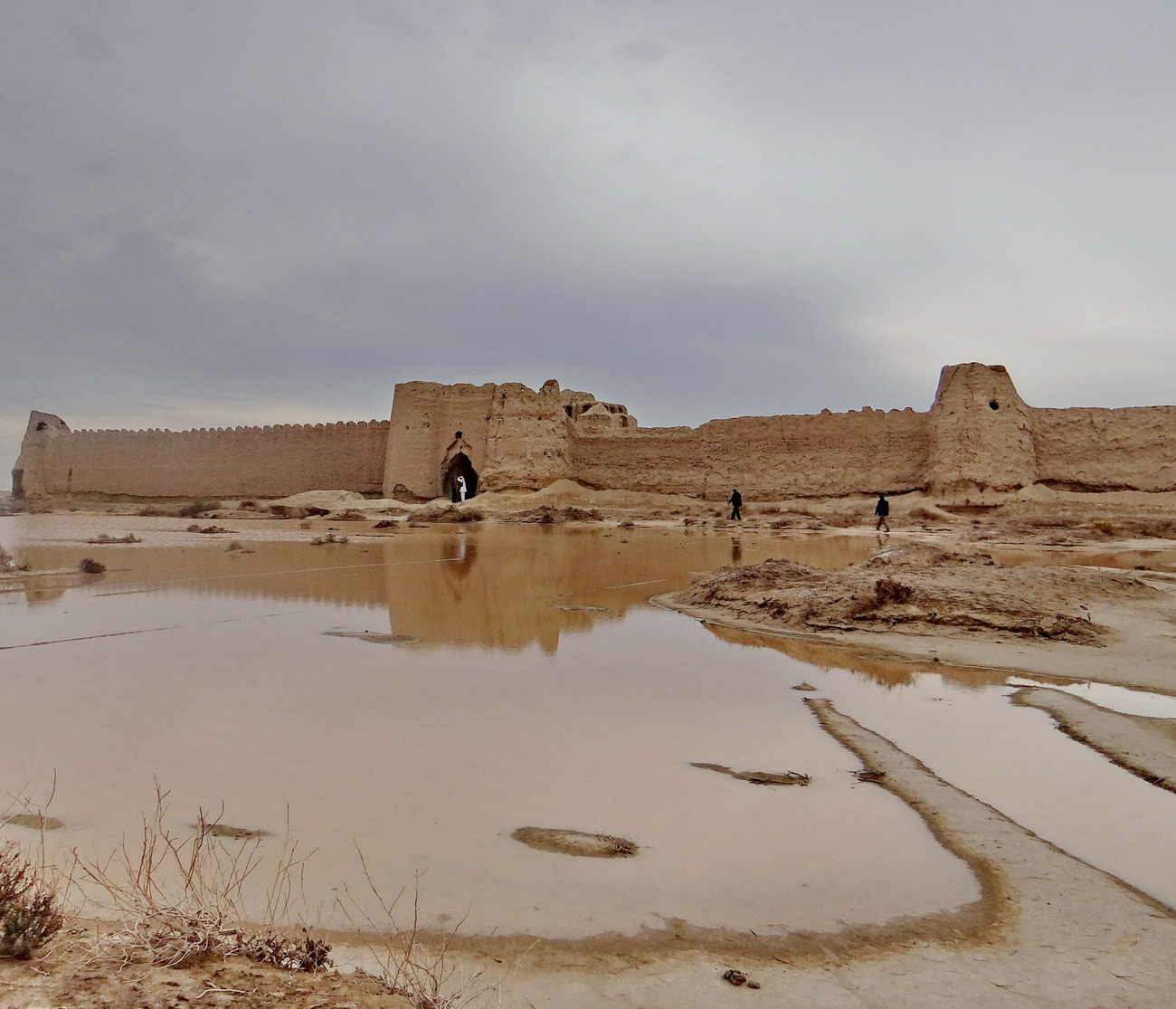

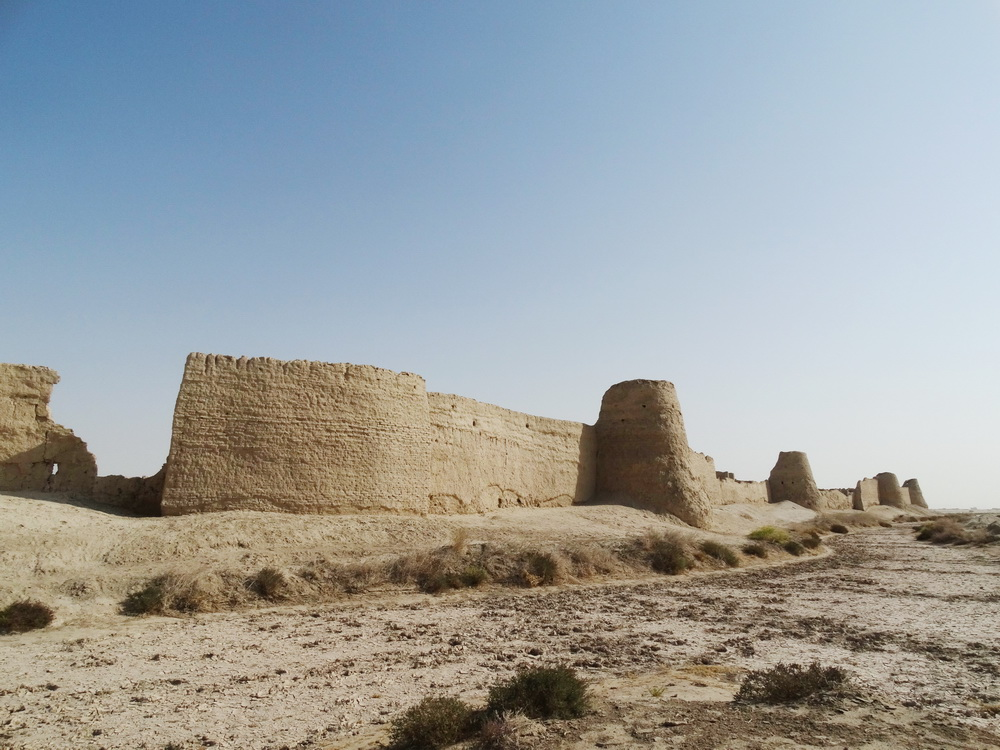

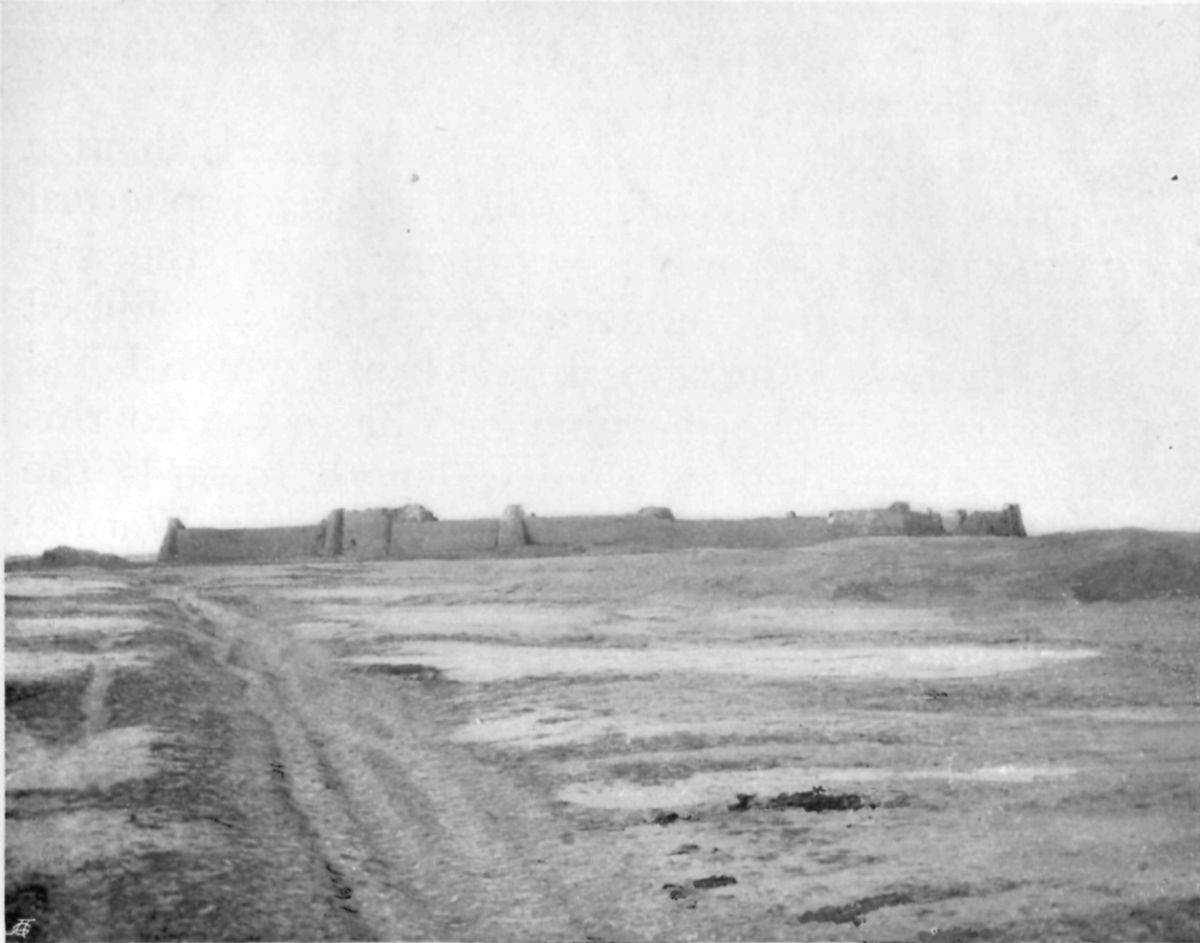

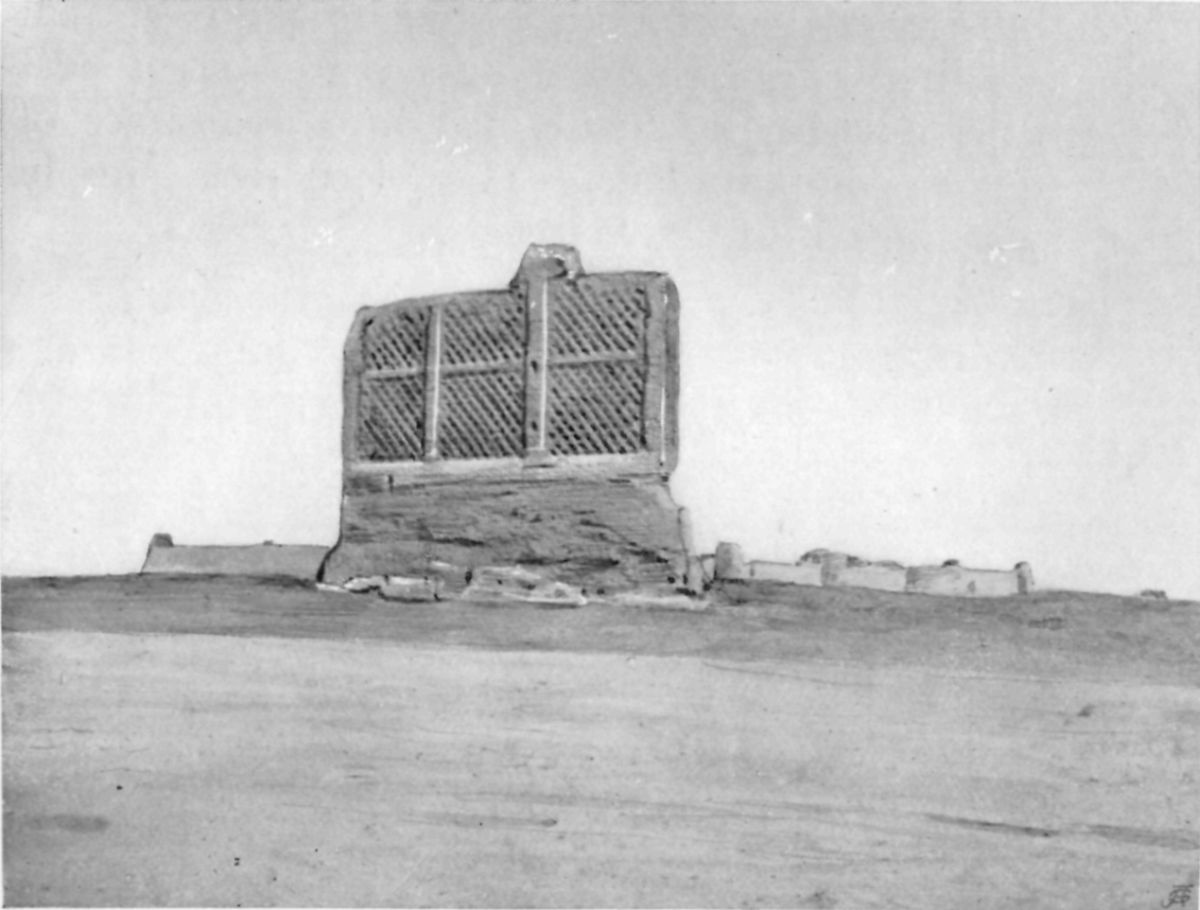

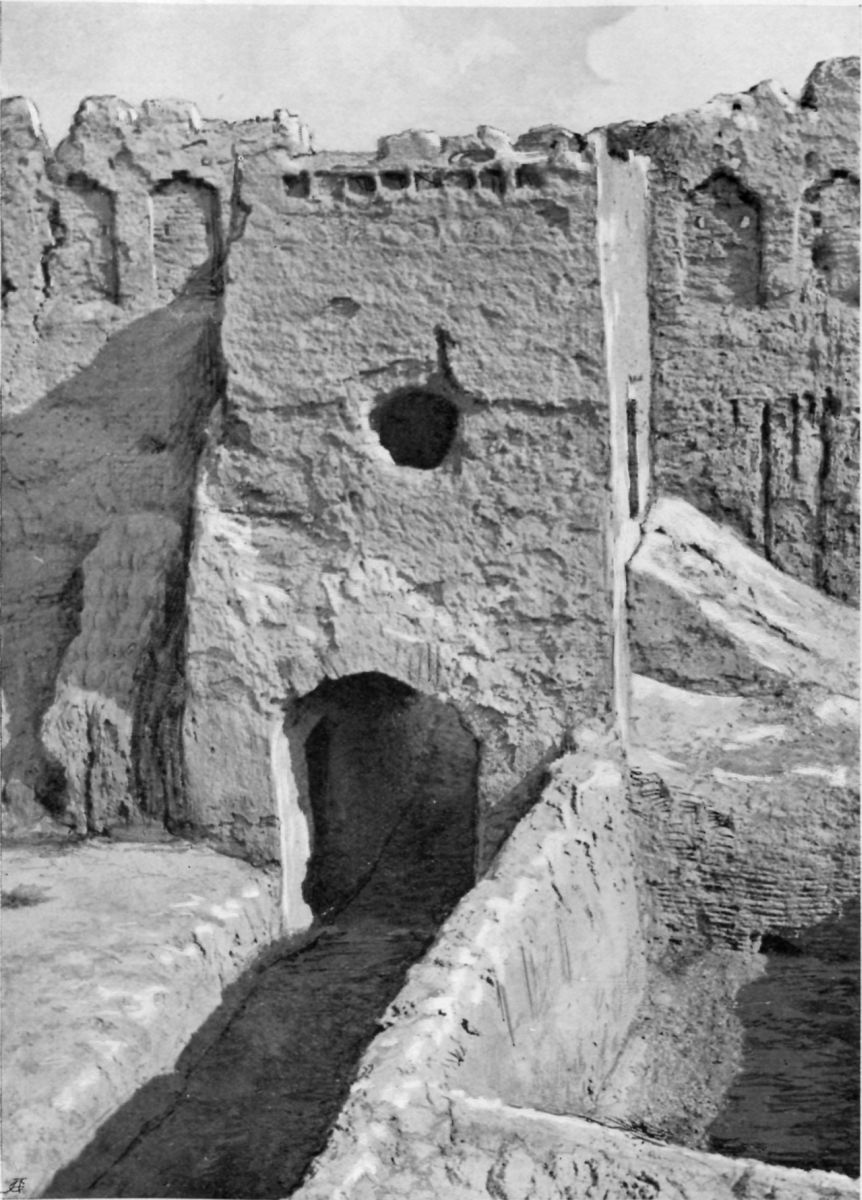

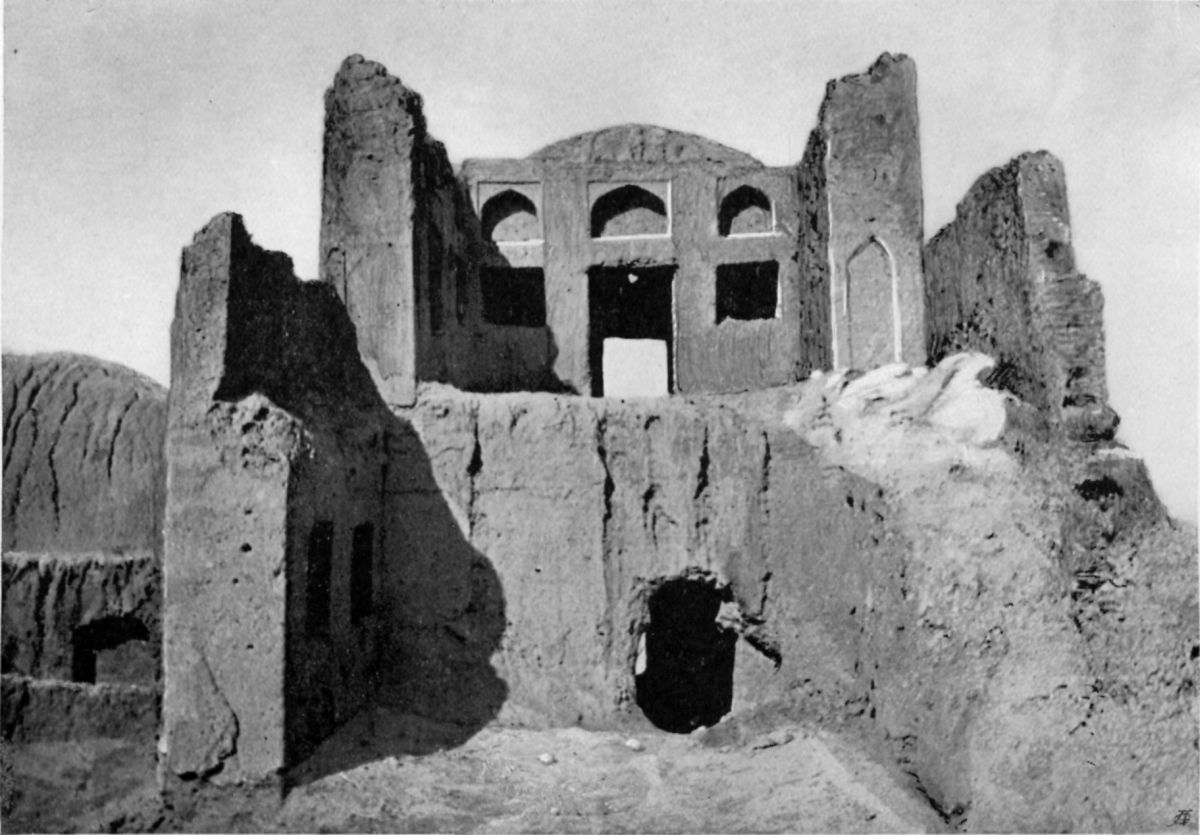

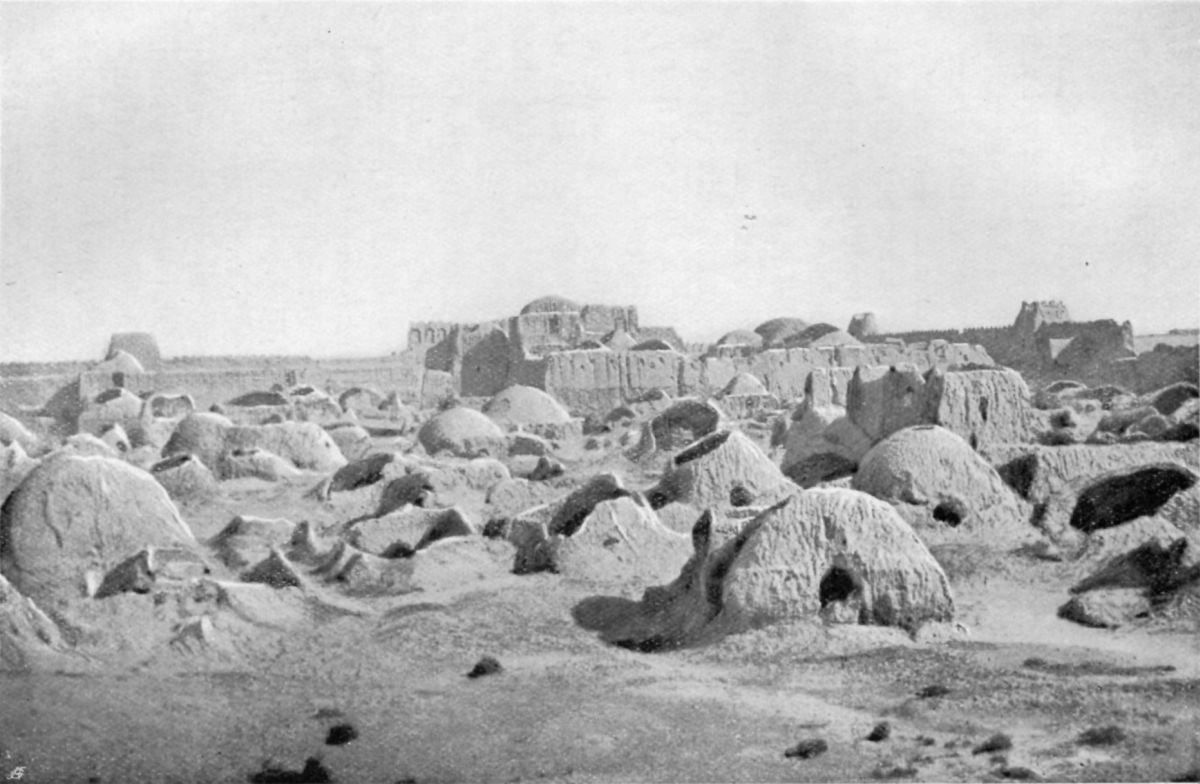
