= Karbasak District =

District in Sistan and Baluchestan province, Iran

Karbasak District Persian: بخش کرباسک
- District
- Location within Iran
- Coordinates: 31°00′56″N 61°37′46″E
- Country: Iran
- Province: Sistan and Baluchestan
- County: Zabol
- Capital: Karbasak
- Time zone: UTC+3:30 (IRST)

Karbasak District (Persian: بخش کرباسک) is in Zabol County, Sistan and Baluchestan province, Iran. Its capital is the village of Karbasak, whose population at the time of the 2016 National Census was 1,313 people in 369 households.

== History ==
After the 2016 census, villages of the Central District were separated from it in the formation of Karbasak District.

== Demographics ==
=== Administrative divisions ===
Karbasak District
Administrative Divisions
Karbasak RD
Zhalehi RD
RD = Rural District
