= Mohammadreza Sargolzaee =

Iranian psychiatrist (born 1970)

Mohammadreza Sargolzaee محمدرضا سرگلزایی
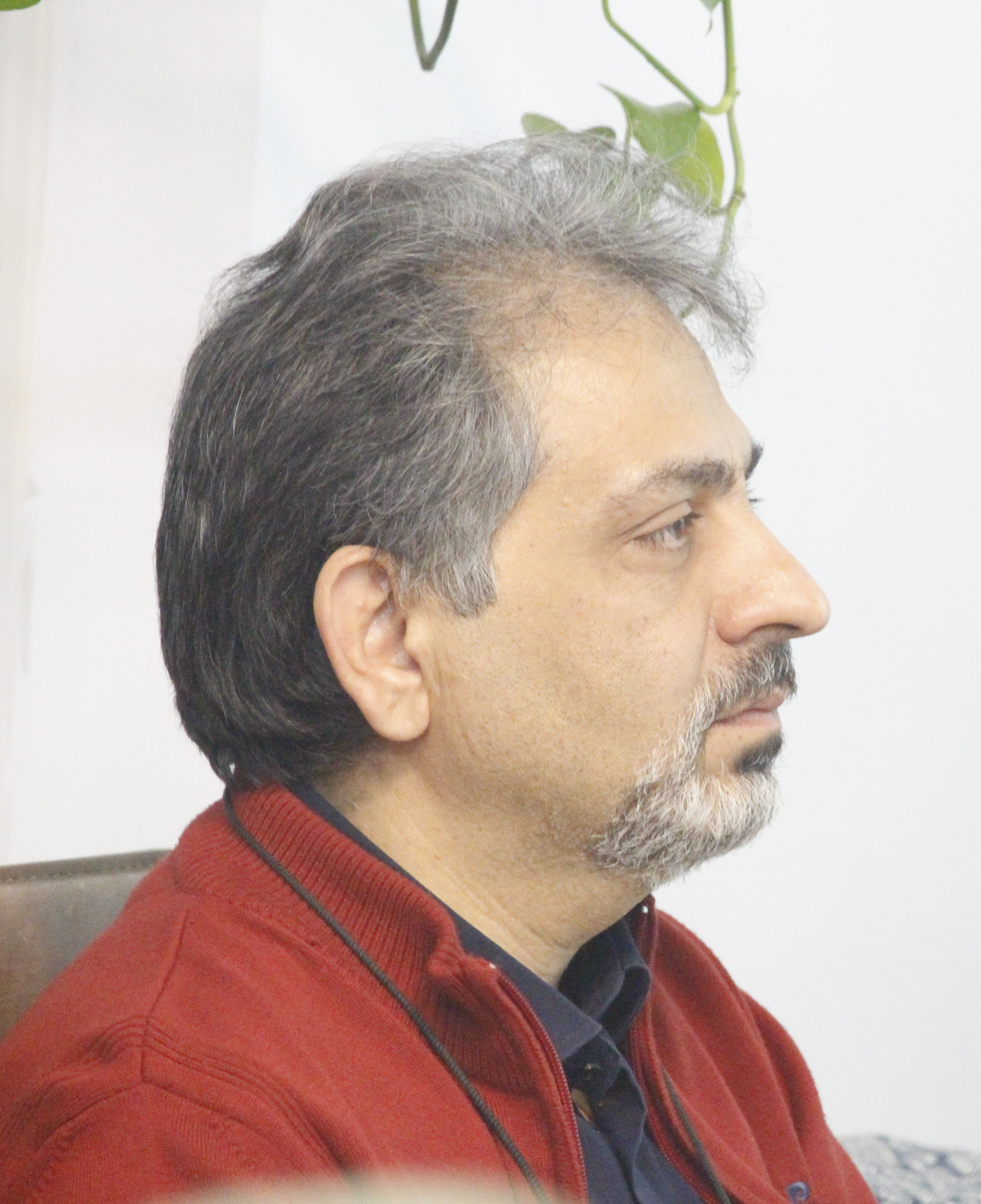
- Born: 26 October 1970; Zabol, Sistan and Baluchestan province, Iran
- Education: Psychiatrist
- Alma mater: Zahedan University of Medical Sciences; Mashhad University of Medical Sciences
- Occupations: Physician, psychiatrist, poet, writer
- Known for: Psychology and philosophy lectures on YouTube Establishment of the first government clinic for the treatment of alcohol dependence in Iran
- Website: https://drsargolzaee.com/

Mohammadreza Sargolzaee (Persian: محمدرضا سرگلزایی, born 26 October 1970) is an Iranian psychiatrist, poet, author, and researcher in philosophy and mythology. He is known as the founder of the first government clinic for the treatment of alcohol addiction in Iran.

== Background ==
Mohammadreza Sargolzaee was born on 26 October 1970, in Zabol, Sistan and Baluchestan province, Iran. He spent his childhood in South Khorasan province (Birjand and Qaen) and his adolescence in Mashhad. In the fall of 1988, he entered Zahedan University of Medical Sciences and started working in medicine in 1995.

He entered a specialized course in psychiatry in 1997 and in 2000 he received his specialized board of psychiatry with the third rank in Iran and became a member of the Mashhad University of Medical Sciences, although in 2004 he left teaching at the university with the aim of public education and wider cultural activities. In 2014, at the invitation of the National Center for Addiction Studies of Iran (Tehran University of Medical Sciences), he set up the first government clinic for alcohol addiction treatment in Iran.
