= Teymurabad, Lorestan =

Teymurabad (Persian: تيموراباد) may refer to the following places in Lorestan:

- Teymurabad, Pol-e Dokhtar
- Teymurabad, Selseleh
