= Shahr-e Jadid-e Ramshar =

City in Sistan and Baluchestan province, Iran

Shahr-e Jadid-e Ramshar Persian: شهر جدید رامشار
- City
- Location within Iran
- Coordinates: 30°42′16″N 61°23′17″E
- Country: Iran
- Province: Sistan and Baluchestan
- County: Hamun
- District: Central
- Time zone: UTC+3:30 (IRST)

Shahr-e Jadid-e Ramshar (Persian: شهر جدید رامشار) is a planned city in the Central District of Hamun County, Sistan and Baluchestan province, Iran. It is 35 kilometres (22 miles) from Zabol and 170 kilometres (110 miles) from Zahedan, and is considered one of the first-generation cities built with the purpose of housing the overflowing population of the province.

About 2,200 people registered to participate in the National Housing Movement Plan, of whom 1,000 people were found to be eligible. The quota for the first year of the new city of Ramshar in the Plan was the construction of 300 units, which were to be put into operation by the end of 2022. The units will be built in the form of villas, each with a size of 200 square metres (2,200 ft^{2}) to 220 square metres (2,400 ft^{2}).
