= Heydarabad Rural District =

Rural district in Sistan and Baluchestan province, Iran

Heydarabad Rural District Persian: دهستان حیدرآباد
- Rural District
- Location within Iran
- Coordinates: 31°06′47″N 61°34′09″E
- Country: Iran
- Province: Sistan and Baluchestan
- County: Zabol
- District: Central
- Capital: Heydarabad
- Time zone: UTC+3:30 (IRST)

Heydarabad Rural District (Persian: دهستان حیدرآباد) is in the Central District of Zabol County, Sistan and Baluchestan province, Iran. Its capital is the village of Heydarabad, whose population at the time of the 2016 National Census was 740 people in 217 households.

== History ==
Heydarabad Rural District was created in the Central District after the 2016 census.
