= Central District (Hamun County) =

District in Sistan and Baluchestan province, Iran

Central District (Hamun County) Persian: بخش مرکزی شهرستان هامون
- District
- Location within Iran
- Coordinates: 30°33′09″N 61°05′01″E
- Country: Iran
- Province: Sistan and Baluchestan
- County: Hamun
- Capital: Mohammadabad

Population (2016)
  - Total: 34,570
- Time zone: UTC+3:30 (IRST)

The Central District of Hamun County (Persian: بخش مرکزی شهرستان هامون) is in Sistan and Baluchestan province, Iran. Its capital is the city of Mohammadabad.

== History ==
In 2013, Shib Ab District was separated from Zabol County in the establishment of Hamun County, which was divided into two districts of two rural districts each, with Mohammadabad as its capital. After the 2016 National Census, Shahr-e Jadid-e Ramshar was elevated to the status of a city.

== Demographics ==
=== Population ===
At the time of the 2016 census, the district's population was 34,570 inhabitants in 9,397 households.

Central District (Hamun County) Population
Administrative Divisions	2016
Lutak RD	12,797
Mohammadabad RD	13,526
Ali Akbar (city) (Note: Formerly the village of Shahrak-e Ali Akbar)	4,779
Mohammadabad (city)	3,468
Shahr-e Jadid-e Ramshar (city) (Note: Became a city after the 2016 census)	
Total	34,570
RD = Rural District
