= University of Sistan and Baluchestan =

Public University in Zahedan, Iran

- دانشگاه سیستان و بلوچستان; Daneshgah-e Sistan vâ Baluchestan
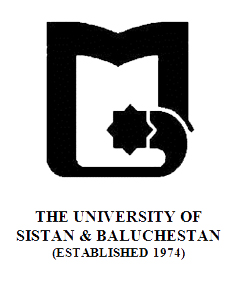
- Type: Public
- Established: 1974
- Chancellor: Gholamreza Rezaei
- Faculty: 450
- Undergraduates: 12,870 (2017)
- Postgraduates: 2400
- Location: Zahedan, Sistan and Baluchestan Province, Iran
- Campus: Zahedan, International Campus, Iranshahr, Saravan
- Athletics: USB teams
- Website: www.usb.ac.ir/en

University of Sistan and Baluchestan (Persian: دانشگاه سیستان و بلوچستان, romanized: "Daneshgah-e Sistan vâ Baluchestan") is a public research university in Zahedan, Sistan and Baluchestan province, Iran. It is the largest Higher Education Center in South Eastern Iran. Besides the main campus in Zahedan, it also has two campuses in Iranshahr and Chabahar. University of Sistan and Baluchestan is Iran's second largest university after University of Tehran and ranks as grade A by the Iranian Ministry of Science, Research and Technology.

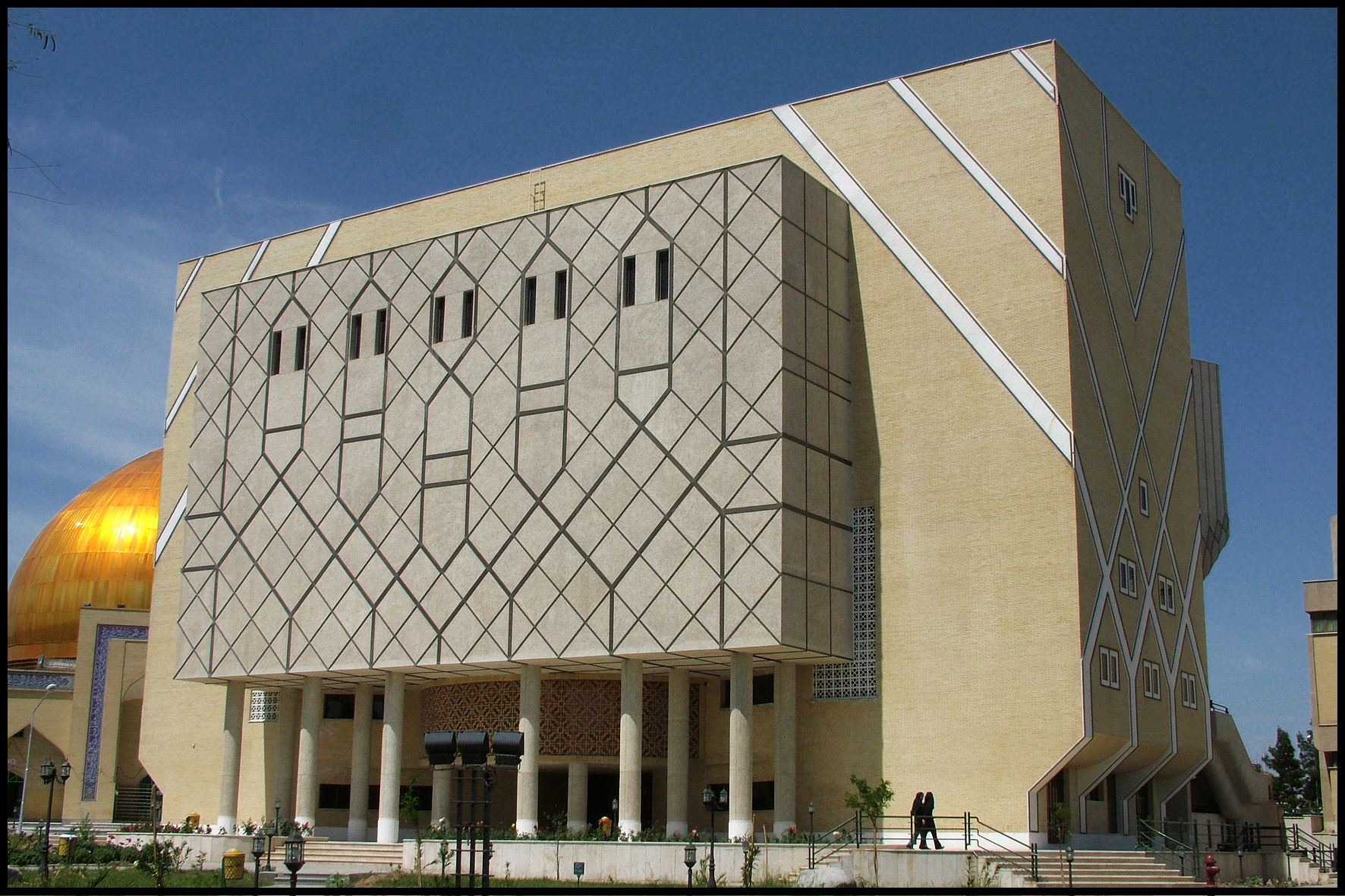
University of Sistan and Baluchestan Amphitheater

== History ==
The University of Sistan and Baluchestan was founded in 1974 originally named University of Baluchestan in Zahedan with initial opening of the Faculty of Engineering and enrolments in Road and Construction Engineering. The next expansions were the Faculty of Nautical Science in Chabahar in 1978, the faculty of Agriculture in Zahedan in 1978 (later moved to Zabol), and the Faculty of Basic Science in Zahedan in 1989. In 1991, Zahedan Teacher Training University was merged with the University of Sistan and Baluchestan, followed by the establishment of other faculties, including Economics and Management, Fine Arts, Iranshahr Teacher Training, Earth Science and Geography, Educational Science and Psychology, as well as the faculty of electrical and computer engineering in 2005.

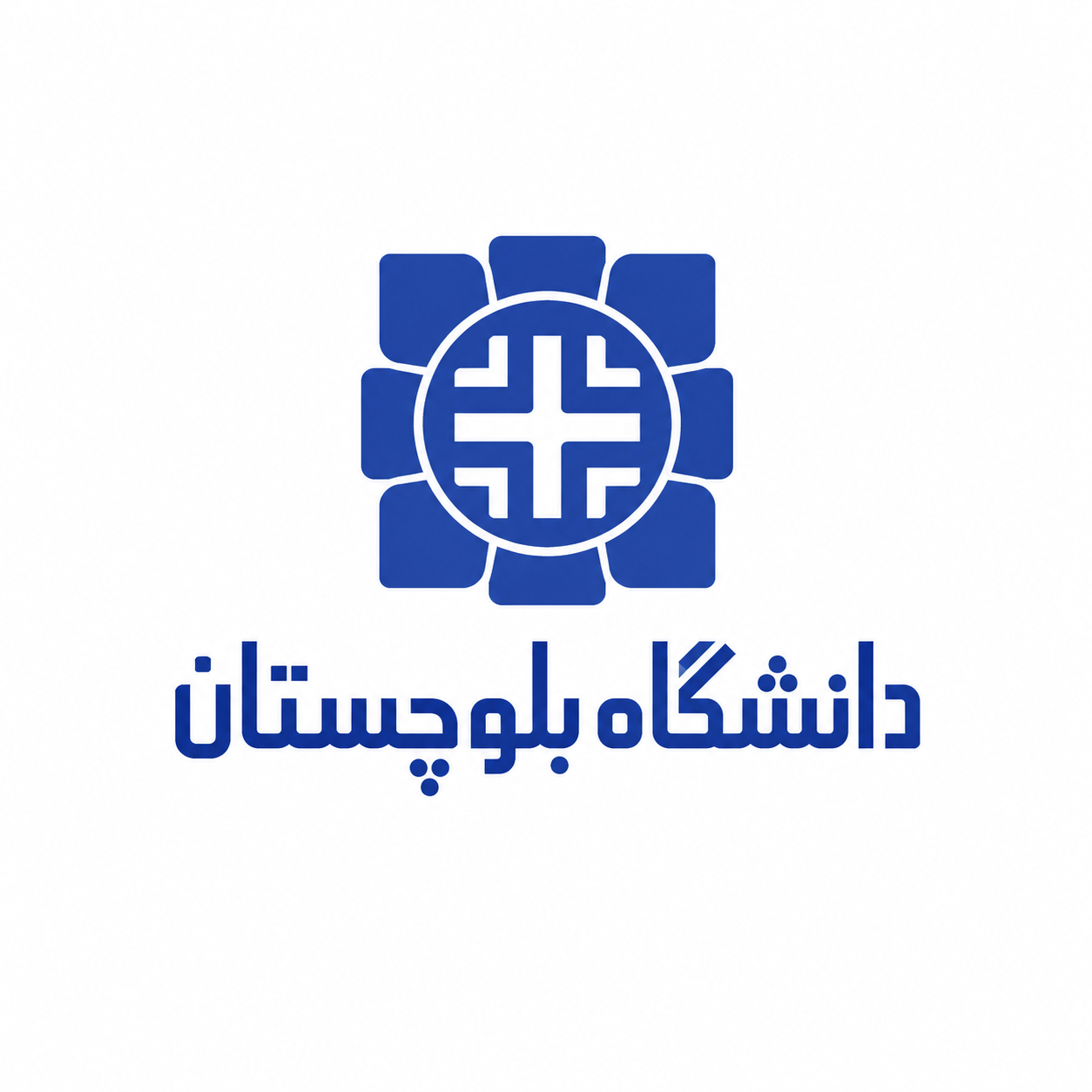
Reconstructed former seal of the University of Baluchestan

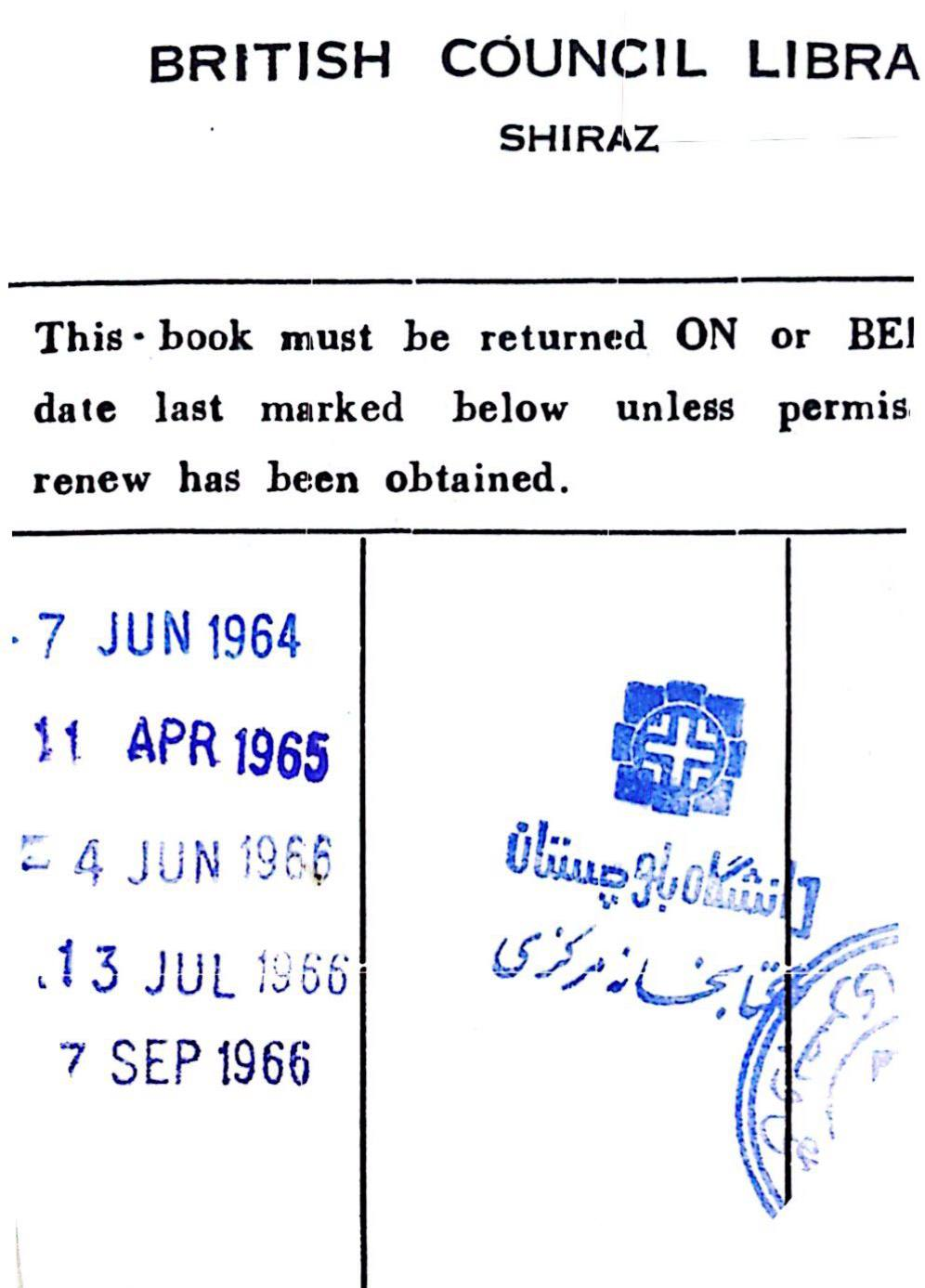
Former seal of the University of Baluchestan on a book formerly held by the British Council Library in Shiraz in the 1960s.

== Faculties ==
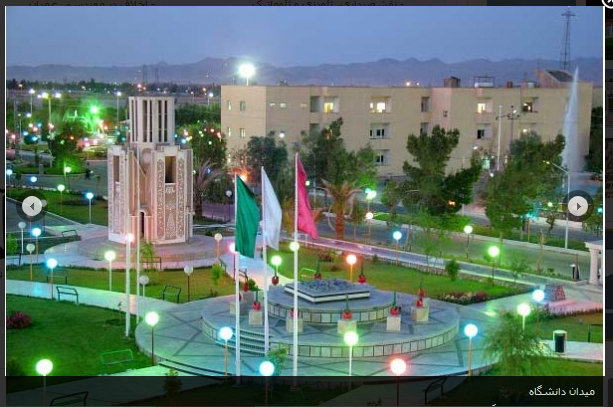
University of Sistan and Baluchestan Central Square

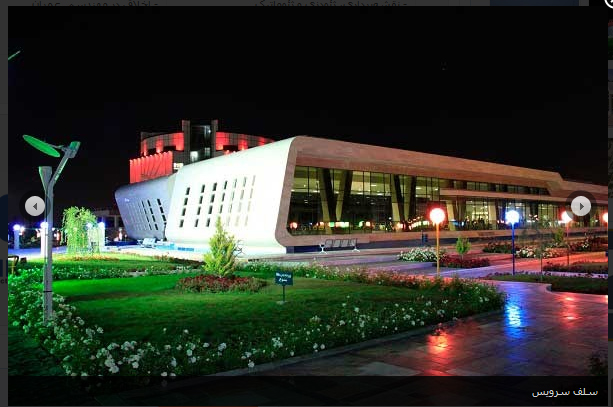
University of Sistan and Baluchestan Services

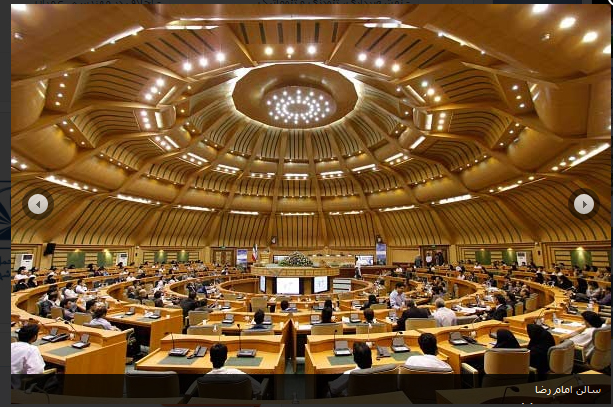
University of Sistan and Baluchestan Imam Reza Hall

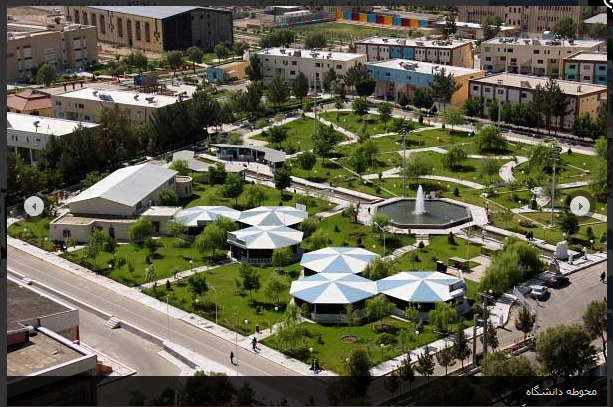
University of Sistan and Baluchestan Services Area

Faculty of Arts and Architecture, founded in 1993

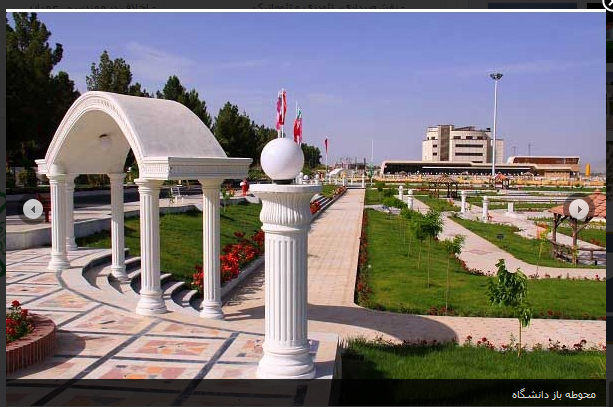
University of Sistan and Baluchestan Services Civil Engineering Department

The university has 13 faculties:

Faculties
Faculty of Administration and Accounting
Faculty of Agriculture and Natural Resources, Saravan
Faculty of Economics
Faculty of Electrical and Computer Engineering
Faculty of Engineering
Faculty of Arts and Architecture
Faculty of Geography and Environmental Planning
Faculty of Literature and Humanities
Faculty of Mathematics
Faculty of Physical Education
Faculty of Psychology and Educational Science
Faculty of Science
Faculty of Theology

== International campus ==
University of Sistan and Baluchistan is a public university in southeastern Iran, active in higher education and research. In line with its main objectives, postgraduate programs have been developed in most departments with many now offering PhD programs. Opening of the Chabahar International Campus has been a step toward involvement of the university in the international higher education arena. This will open the scientific abilities of the USB.

1. Agricultural Biotechnology (PhD)
2. Molecular Genetics (PhD)
3. Agricultural Economics (M.Sc.)
4. Chemical Engineering, Process Integration (M.Sc.)
5. Civil Engineering, Structural Division (PhD)
6. Civil Engineering, Structural Division (M.Sc.)
7. Civil Engineering, Hydraulic Structures Division (M.Sc.)
8. Civil Engineering, Water Engineering Division (M.Sc.)
9. Computer Science (M.Sc.)
10. Economics (MA)
11. Electrical Engineering, Electronics (M.Sc.)
12. Information Technology Management (MA)
13. Master of Business Administration (MA) with 3 majors
14. Mechatronics (M.Sc.)
15. Mechanics, Energy (M.Sc.)
16. Biology, Genetics (M.Sc.)
17. Entrepreneurship (MA)
18. Geography, Tourism (MA)
19. English Language, Teaching (MA)

== Iranshahr Campus ==
This faculty was established in 1992. The complex has been granted the basic approval for promotion to an independent university.

== Research institutes ==
Institutes
South Asia and Indian Subcontinent Research Institute
Earth Science and Geography Research Institute
Centre for Research in Nanotechnology
Centre for Research in Fuzzy Systems
Mining Research Institute
Renewable Energies Research Institute
Literature and Humanities Research Institute

== International Journals ==
1. Challenges in Nano and Micro Scale Science and Technology
2. Economic Knowledge in Agriculture
3. Geography and Development Iranian Journal
4. Geography and Territorial Spatial Arrangement
5. International Journal of Business and Development Studies
6. International Journal of Communications and Information Technology
7. International Journal of Industrial Electronics Control and Optimization
8. Iranian Journal of Applied Language Studies
9. Iranian Journal of Archaeological Studies
10. Iranian Journal of Fuzzy Systems
11. Journal of Educational Psychology Studies
12. Journal of Epigenetics
13. Journal of Historical Researches of Iran and Islam
14. Journal of Hydrosciences and Environment
15. Journal of Innovation Ecosystem
16. Journal of Lyrical Literature Researches
17. Journal of Natural Environmental Hazards
18. Journal of Subcontinent Researches
19. Public Management Researches
20. Stable Economy and Sustainable Development
21. Studies in Comparative Religion and Mysticism

== See also ==
- Higher Education in Iran
- List of universities in Iran
- Zabol University
- Zahedan University of Medical Sciences
- Zabol University of Medical Sciences
- International University of Chabahar
