= Bonjar =

City in Sistan and Baluchestan province, Iran

Bonjar Persian: بنجار
- City
- Location within Iran
- Coordinates: 31°02′35″N 61°34′07″E
- Country: Iran
- Province: Sistan and Baluchestan
- County: Zabol
- District: Central

Population (2016)
  - Total: 3,760
- Time zone: UTC+3:30 (IRST)

Bonjar (Persian: بنجار) (Note: Also romanized as Bonjār) is a city in the Central District of Zabol County, Sistan and Baluchestan province, Iran, serving as the administrative center for Bonjar Rural District.

== Demographics ==
=== Population ===
At the time of the 2006 National Census, the city's population was 3,619 in 847 households. The following census in 2011 counted 4,088 people in 1,022 households. The 2016 census measured the population of the city as 3,760 people in 1,027 households.
