= Kuh-e Khajeh Rural District =

Rural district in Sistan and Baluchestan province, Iran

Kuh-e Khajeh Rural District Persian: دهستان کوه خواجه
- Rural District
- Location within Iran
- Coordinates: 30°54′03″N 61°13′44″E
- Country: Iran
- Province: Sistan and Baluchestan
- County: Hamun
- District: Teymurabad
- Capital: Siyadan

Population (2016)
  - Total: 1,434
- Time zone: UTC+3:30 (IRST)

Kuh-e Khajeh Rural District (Persian: دهستان کوه خواجه) is in Teymurabad District of Hamun County, Sistan and Baluchestan province, Iran. Its capital is the village of Siyadan.

== Demographics ==
=== Population ===
At the time of the 2006 National Census, the rural district's population (as a part of the former Shib Ab District of Zabol County) was 6,482 in 1,580 households. There were 1,601 inhabitants in 484 households at the following census of 2011. The 2016 census measured the population of the rural district as 1,434 in 456 households, by which time the district had been separated from the county in the establishment of Hamun County. The rural district was transferred to the new Teymurabad District. The most populous of its 15 villages was Siyadan, with 408 people.
