= Teymurabad District =

District in Sistan and Baluchestan province, Iran

Teymurabad District Persian: بخش تیمورآباد
- District
- Location within Iran
- Coordinates: 30°54′03″N 61°15′50″E
- Country: Iran
- Province: Sistan and Baluchestan
- County: Hamun
- Capital: Teymurabad

Population (2016)
  - Total: 6,290
- Time zone: UTC+3:30 (IRST)

Teymurabad District (Persian: بخش تیمورآباد) is in Hamun County, Sistan and Baluchestan province, Iran. Its capital is the village of Teymurabad.

== History ==
In September 2013, Shib Ab District was separated from Zabol County in the establishment of Hamun County, which was divided into two districts of two rural districts each, with the city of Mohammadabad as its capital.

== Demographics ==
=== Population ===
At the time of the 2016 National Census, the district's population was 6,290 inhabitants in 1,943 households.

=== Administrative divisions ===
Teymurabad District Population
Administrative Divisions	2016
Kuh-e Khajeh RD	1,434
Teymurabad RD	4,856
Total	6,290
RD = Rural District
