= Teymurabad Rural District =

Rural district in Sistan and Baluchestan province, Iran

Teymurabad Rural District Persian: دهستان تیمورآباد
- Rural District
- Location within Iran
- Coordinates: 30°56′22″N 61°22′36″E
- Country: Iran
- Province: Sistan and Baluchestan
- County: Hamun
- District: Teymurabad
- Capital: Teymurabad

Population (2016)
  - Total: 4,856
- Time zone: UTC+3:30 (IRST)

Teymurabad Rural District (Persian: دهستان تیمورآباد) is in Teymurabad District of Hamun County, Sistan and Baluchestan province, Iran. Its capital is the village of Teymurabad.

== Demographics ==
=== Population ===
At the time of the 2006 National Census, the rural district's population (as a part of the former Shib Ab District of Zabol County) was 6,209 in 1,549 households. There were 5,879 inhabitants in 1,600 households at the following census of 2011. The 2016 census measured the population of the rural district as 4,856 in 1,487 households, by which time the district had been separated from the county in the establishment of Hamun County. The rural district was transferred to the new Teymurabad District. The most populous of its 35 villages was Deh-e Esmail Qanbar, with 527 people.
