= Mohammadabad, Hamun =

City in Sistan and Baluchestan province, Iran

Mohammadabad Persian: محمّدآباد
- City
- Location within Iran
- Coordinates: 30°53′08″N 61°27′49″E
- Country: Iran
- Province: Sistan and Baluchestan
- County: Hamun
- District: Central

Population (2016)
  - Total: 3,468
- Time zone: UTC+3:30 (IRST)

Mohammadabad (Persian: محمّدآباد) (Note: Also romanized as Moḩammadābād, also known as Moḩammadābād-e Āqā’ī, Moḩammadābād-e Shīb Āb, and Muhammadābād) is a city in the Central District of Hamun County, Sistan and Baluchestan province, Iran, serving as capital of both the county and the district. It is also the administrative center for Mohammadabad Rural District.

== Demographics ==
=== Population ===
At the time of the 2006 National Census, the city's population was 2,175 in 509 households, when it was capital of the former Shib Ab District of Zabol County. The following census in 2011 counted 2,681 people in 645 households. The 2016 census measured the population of the city as 3,468 people in 909 households, by which time the district had been separated from the county in the establishment of Hamun County. The city and the rural district were transferred to the new Central District, with Mohammadabad as the county's capital.
