= Kak Kahzad Castle, Dana =

Castle in Kohgiluyeh and Boyer-Ahmad Province, Iran

Kak Kahzad Castle
- قلعه کک کهزاد

General information
- Type: Castle
- Location: Dana County, Iran

Kak Kahzad Castle (Persian: قلعه کک کهزاد) is a historical castle located in Dana County in Kohgiluyeh and Boyer-Ahmad Province, Iran. The fortress dates back to the Sasanian Empire.
