= Teymurabad, Selseleh =

Teymurabad تيمور اباد
- Village
- Location within Iran
- Coordinates: 33°53′09″N 48°14′25″E
- Country: Iran
- Province: Lorestan
- County: Selseleh
- Bakhsh: Central
- Rural District: Yusefvand

Population (2006)
  - Total: 51
- Time zone: UTC+3:30 (IRST)
  - Summer (DST): UTC+4:30 (IRDT)

Teymurabad (Persian: تيمور اباد, also Romanized as Teymūrābād) is a village in Yusefvand Rural District, in the Central District of Selseleh County, Lorestan Province, Iran. At the 2006 census, its population was 51, in 13 families.
