= Bonjar Rural District =

Rural district in Sistan and Baluchestan province, Iran

Bonjar Rural District Persian: دهستان بنجار
- Rural District
- Location within Iran
- Coordinates: 31°03′12″N 61°33′24″E
- Country: Iran
- Province: Sistan and Baluchestan
- County: Zabol
- District: Central
- Capital: Bonjar

Population (2016)
  - Total: 26,924
- Time zone: UTC+3:30 (IRST)

Bonjar Rural District (Persian: دهستان بنجار) is in the Central District of Zabol County, Sistan and Baluchestan province, Iran. It is administered from the city of Bonjar.

== Demographics ==
=== Population ===
At the time of the 2006 National Census, the rural district's population was 26,034 in 5,841 households. There were 30,130 inhabitants in 7,256 households at the following census of 2011. The 2016 census measured the population of the rural district as 26,924 in 7,263 households. The most populous of its 97 villages was Tappeh Daz, with 2,335 people.
