= Teymurabad, Pol-e Dokhtar =

Teymurabad تيموراباد
- Village
- Location within Iran
- Coordinates: 33°15′02″N 47°44′36″E
- Country: Iran
- Province: Lorestan
- County: Pol-e Dokhtar
- Bakhsh: Central
- Rural District: Malavi

Population (2006)
  - Total: 183
- Time zone: UTC+3:30 (IRST)
  - Summer (DST): UTC+4:30 (IRDT)

Teymurabad (Persian: تيموراباد, also Romanized as Teymūrābād) is a village in Malavi Rural District, in the Central District of Pol-e Dokhtar County, Lorestan Province, Iran. At the 2006 census, its population was 183, in 37 families.
