= Zahedan University of Medical Sciences =

Public university in Zahedan, Iran

- دانشگاه علوم پزشکی و خدمات بهداشتی درمانی زاهدان
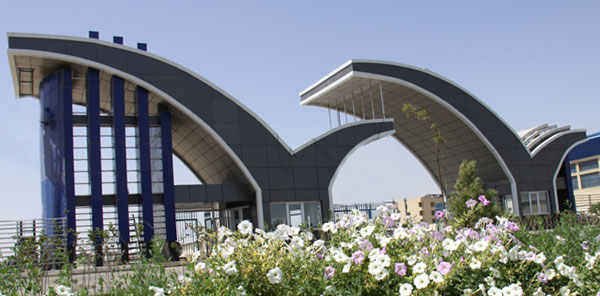
- Zahedan University of Medical Sciences
- Established: 1986
- Chancellor: Dr. Mohammad Hassan Mohamadi
- Administrative staff: 378
- Students: 4,450
- Location: Zahedan, Iran; 29.447918°N 60.850642°E
- Website: zaums.ac.ir
- Location in Iran

Zahedan University of Medical Sciences (Persian: دانشگاه علوم پزشکی و خدمات بهداشتی درمانی زاهدان) is a public university in Zahedan, Iran. The university has six faculties including medicine, dentistry, rehabilitation, health care, nursing, paramedicine and a satellite schools in Khash.

The university was founded in 1986 and it offers 64 fields in 6 faculties and its 378 academic members provide educational services to more than 4,400 students.
