= Central District (Zabol County) =

District in Sistan and Baluchestan province, Iran

Central District (Zabol County) Persian: بخش مرکزی شهرستان زابل
- District
- Location within Iran
- Coordinates: 31°05′39″N 61°33′24″E
- Country: Iran
- Province: Sistan and Baluchestan
- County: Zabol
- Capital: Zabol

Population (2016)
  - Total: 165,634
- Time zone: UTC+3:30 (IRST)

The Central District of Zabol County (Persian: بخش مرکزی شهرستان زابل) is in Sistan and Baluchestan province, Iran. Its capital is the city of Zabol.

== History ==
Heydarabad Rural District was created in the district after the 2016 National Census.

== Demographics ==
=== Population ===
At the time of the 2006 census, the district's population was 160,295 in 34,555 households. The following census in 2011 counted 171,940 people in 42,235 households. The 2016 census measured the population of the district as 165,634 inhabitants in 43,691 households.

=== Administrative divisions ===
Central District (Zabol County) Population
Administrative Divisions	2006	2011	2016
Bonjar RD	26,034	30,130	26,924
Heydarabad RD (Note: Established after the 2016 census)			
Bonjar (city)	3,619	4,088	3,760
Zabol (city)	130,642	137,722	134,950
Total	160,295	171,940	165,634
RD = Rural District
