= Shib Ab District =

Former district in Sistan and Baluchestan province, Iran

Shib Ab District Persian: بخش شیب‌آب
- Former District
- Location within Iran
- Coordinates: 30°33′09″N 61°05′01″E
- Country: Iran
- Province: Sistan and Baluchestan
- County: Zabol
- Capital: Mohammadabad

Population (2011)
  - Total: 41,520
- Time zone: UTC+3:30 (IRST)

Shib Ab District (Persian: بخش شیب‌آب) is a former administrative division of Zabol County, Sistan and Baluchestan province, Iran. Its capital was the city of Mohammadabad.

== History ==
In 2013, the district was separated from the county in the establishment of Hamun County.

== Demographics ==
=== Population ===
At the time of the 2006 National Census, the district's population was 43,374 in 9,809 households. The following census in 2011 counted 41,520 people in 10,623 households.

=== Administrative divisions ===
Shib Ab District Population
Administrative Divisions	2006	2011
Kuh-e Khajeh RD	6,482	1,601
Lutak RD	14,019	13,167
Mohammadabad RD	14,489	13,641
Teymurabad RD	6,209	5,879
Mohammadabad (city)	2,175	2,681
Ali Akbar (city) (Note: Formerly the village of Shahrak-e Ali Akbar)		4,551
Total	43,374	41,520
RD = Rural District
