= Hamun County =

County in Sistan and Baluchestan province, Iran

Hamun County Persian: شهرستان هامون
- County
- Location of Hamun County in Sistan and Baluchestan province (top left, pink)

- Location of Sistan and Baluchestan province in Iran
- Coordinates: 30°33′09″N 61°05′01″E
- Country: Iran
- Province: Sistan and Baluchestan
- Capital: Mohammadabad
- Districts: Central, Teymurabad

Population (2016)
  - Total: 41,017
- Time zone: UTC+3:30 (IRST)

Hamun County (Persian: شهرستان هامون) is in Sistan and Baluchestan province, Iran. Its capital is the city of Mohammadabad.

== History ==
In 2013, Shib Ab District was separated from Zabol County in the establishment of Hamun County, which was divided into two districts of two rural districts each, with Mohammadabad as its capital. After the 2016 National Census, Shahr-e Jadid-e Ramshar was elevated to the status of a city.

== Demographics ==
=== Population ===
At the time of the 2016 census, the county's population was 41,017 in 11,380 households.

=== Administrative divisions ===
Hamun County's population and administrative structure are shown in the following table.

Hamun County Population
Administrative Divisions	2016
Central District	34,570
Lutak RD	12,797
Mohammadabad RD	13,526
Ali Akbar (city) (Note: Formerly the village of Shahrak-e Ali Akbar)	4,779
Mohammadabad (city)	3,468
Shahr-e Jadid-e Ramshar (city) (Note: Became a city after the 2016 census)	
Teymurabad District	6,290
Kuh-e Khajeh RD	1,434
Teymurabad RD	4,856
Total	41,017
RD = Rural District

== See also ==
Media related to Hamun County at Wikimedia Commons
