= Zabol County =

County in Sistan and Baluchestan province, Iran

Zabol County Persian: شهرستان زابل
- County
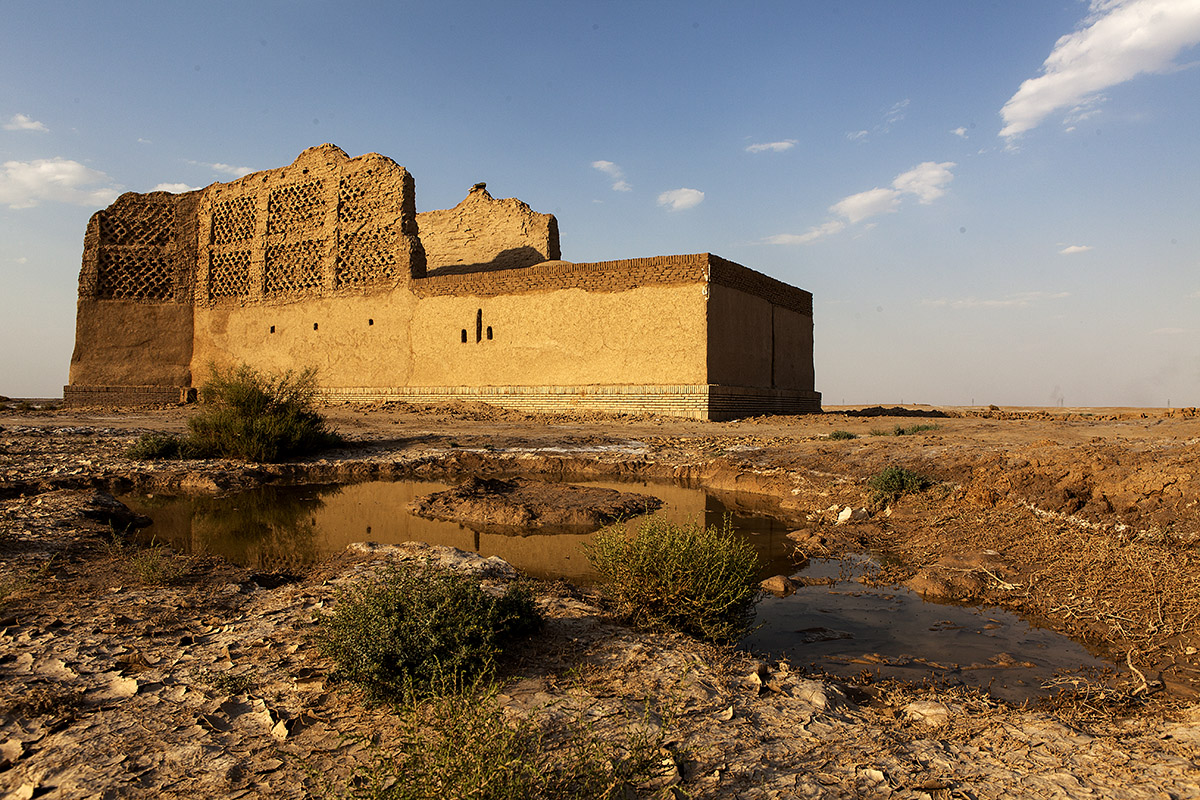

- Location of Zabol County in Sistan and Baluchestan province (top, purple)

- Location of Sistan and Baluchestan province in Iran
- Coordinates: 31°03′N 61°36′E
- Country: Iran
- Province: Sistan and Baluchestan
- Capital: Zabol
- Districts: Central, Karbasak

Population (2016)
  - Total: 165,666
- Time zone: UTC+3:30 (IRST)

Zabol County (Persian: شهرستان زابل) is in Sistan and Baluchestan province, Iran. Its capital is the city of Zabol.

== History ==
After the 2006 National Census, Miyankongi District was separated from the county in the establishment of Miyankongi County. (Note: Renamed Hirmand County)

After the 2011 census, Posht Ab District was separated from the county in establishing Nimruz County, and Shib Ab District to establish Hamun County.

After the 2016 census, Heydarabad Rural District was created in the Central District, and Karbasak District was formed, including the new Karbasak and Zhalehi Rural Districts.

== Demographics ==
=== Population ===
At the time of the 2006 census, the county's population was 317,357 in 67,778 households. The following census in 2011 counted 259,356 people in 63,645 households. The 2016 census measured the population of the county as 165,666 in 43,701 households.

=== Administrative divisions ===
Zabol County's population history and administrative structure over three consecutive censuses are shown in the following table.

Zabol County Population
Administrative Divisions	2006	2011	2016
Central District	160,295	171,940	165,634
Bonjar RD	26,034	30,130	26,924
Heydarabad RD (Note: Established after the 2016 census)			
Bonjar (city)	3,619	4,088	3,760
Zabol (city)	130,642	137,722	134,950
Karbasak District			
Karbasak RD			
Zhalehi RD			
Miyankongi District (Note: Transferred to Miyankongi County, renamed Hirmand County)	73,254		
Dust Mohammad RD	20,788		
Jahanabad RD	16,438		
Margan RD	13,954		
Qorqori RD	15,172		
Dust Mohammad (city)	6,902		
Posht Ab District (Note: Transferred to Nimruz County)	40,434	45,466	
Adimi RD	15,157	17,820	
Bazi RD	5,009	4,580	
Qaemabad RD	13,039	15,637	
Sefidabeh RD	4,255	4,101	
Adimi (city)	2,974	3,328	
Shib Ab District (Note: Transferred to Hamun County)	43,374	41,520	
Kuh-e Khajeh RD	6,482	1,601	
Lutak RD	14,019	13,167	
Mohammadabad RD	14,489	13,641	
Teymurabad RD	6,209	5,879	
Mohammadabad (city)	2,175	2,681	
Ali Akbar (city) (Note: Formerly the village of Shahrak-e Ali Akbar)		4,551	
Total	317,357	259,356	165,666
RD = Rural District

== See also ==
Media related to Zabol County at Wikimedia Commons
