= Sistan and Baluchestan province =

Province in southeastern Iran

Sistan and Baluchestan province استان سیستان و بلوچستان (Persian)
- Province
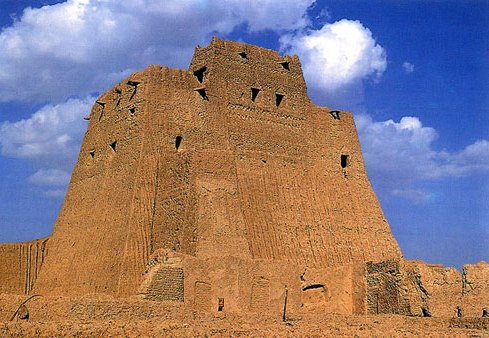
- Sib and Suran Castle

- Map of Iran with Sistan and Baluchestan province highlighted
- Coordinates: 28°17′N 61°07′E
- Country: Iran
- Capital: Zahedan
- Counties: 26

Government
  - Governor-general: Mansour Bijar (Independent)

Area
  - Total: 180,726 km^{2} (69,779 sq mi)

Population (2016)
  - Total: 2,775,014
  - Density: 15.3548/km^{2} (39.7688/sq mi)
- Demonym(s): Baloch & Sistani
- Time zone: UTC+03:30 (IRST)
- ISO 3166 code: IR-11
- Main language(s): Balochi; Persian
- HDI (2017): 0.688 medium · 31st

The Sistan and Baluchestan province (Note: Persian: استان سيستان و بلوچستان, Balochi: ولایت سیستان ءُ بلۏچستان) simply referred to as Sistan-Baluchestan, (Note: Persian: سيستان بلوچستان, Balochi: سیستان بلۏچستان) is the second largest of the 31 provinces of Iran, after Kerman province, with an area of 180,726 km^{2}. Its capital is the city of Zahedan. The province is in the southeast of the country, bordering Afghanistan and Pakistan.

The province is mainly populated by the Baloch people with a small minority of Sistani Persians. Unlike the rest of Iran, the majority of the population is Sunni Muslim, and the local culture is heavily influenced by neighboring Pakistan.

== Etymology ==
The name of the region was simply Balochistan at first (to refer to Balochistan as a whole), but later became Baluchistan and Sistan before becoming Sistan and Baluchestan. Balochistan means the "land of the Baloch".

== History ==
=== Pre-Islamic era ===
In the inscriptions at Behistun and Persepolis, Sistan is mentioned as one of the eastern territories of Darius the Great. The name Sistan is derived from Saka (also sometimes Saga, or Sagastan), a Central Asian tribe that had taken control over this area in the year 128 BC. During the rule of Arsacid dynasty (248 BC to 224 AD), the province became the seat of House of Suren. From the Sasanian period until the early Islamic period, Sistan, as part of Sakastan province, flourished considerably.

=== Post-Islamic era ===
During the reign of Ardashir I, Sistan came under the jurisdiction of the Sasanians, and in 644 AD, the Arab Muslims conquered the Persian empire. During the reign of the sahaba and second Sunni caliph, Umar ibn al-Khattab, this territory was conquered by the Arabs and an Arab commander was assigned as governor. The famous Persian ruler Ya'qub ibn al-Layth al-Saffar, whose descendants dominated this area for many centuries, later became governor of this province. In 916 AD, Balochistan was ruled by the Daylamids and thereafter the Seljuqids, when it became a part of Kerman. Dynasties such as the Saffarids, Samanids, Ghaznavids, and Seljuqids, also ruled over this territory.

In 1508 AD, Shah Ismail I of the Safavid dynasty conquered Sistan. After the assassination of Nader Shah in 1747, Sistan-Baluchestan became part of the Brahui Khanate of Kalat, which ruled it until 1896. Afterwards, it became part of Qajar Iran.

== Demographics ==
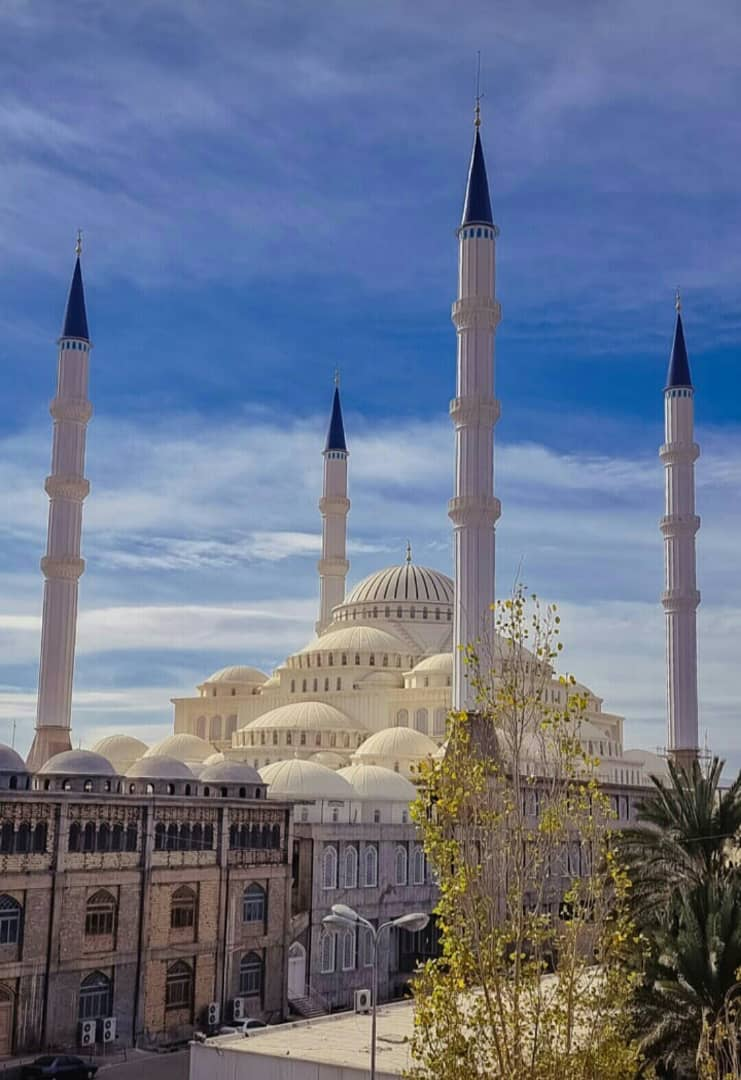
Jameh Mosque of Makki

=== Ethnic demographics ===
The Baloch form a majority 70–76% of the population and the Persian Sistanis a minority. Smaller communities of Kurds (in the eastern highlands and near Iranshahr); the expatriate Brahuis (along the border with Pakistan); and other resident and itinerant ethnic groups, such as the Romani, are also found within the province.

Most of the population are Baloch and speak the Balochi language, although there also exists among them a small community of speakers of the Indo-Aryan language Jadgali.; Sistani Persians are the second largest ethnic group in this province who speak the Sistani dialect of Persian.

=== Religion ===
The majority of the Baloch people of the Balochistan area in the province are Sunni Muslims, belonging to Hanafi school of thought.

== Population ==
At the time of the 2006 National Census, the province's population was 2,349,049 in 468,025 households. The following census in 2011 counted 2,534,327 inhabitants living in 587,921 households. The 2016 census measured the population of the province as 2,775,014 in 704,888 households.

=== Administrative divisions ===

The population history and structural changes of Sistan and Baluchestan Province's administrative divisions over three consecutive censuses are shown in the following table.

=== Population (2006–2016) ===
Counties	2006	2011	2016
Bampur (Note: Separated from Iranshahr County after the 2016 census)	—	—	—
Chabahar	214,017	264,051	283,204
Dalgan (Note: Separated from Iranshahr County after the 2006 census)	—	62,813	67,857
Dashtiari (Note: Separated from Chabahar County after the 2016 census)	—	—	—
Fanuj (Note: Separated from Nik Shahr County after the 2011 census)	—	—	49,161
Golshan (Note: Separated from Saravan County after the 2016 census)	—	—	—
Hamun (Note: Separated from Zabol County after the 2011 census)	—	—	41,017
Hirmand (Note: Separated from Zabol County after the 2006 census)	—	65,471	63,979
Iranshahr	264,226	219,796	254,314
Khash	161,918	155,652	173,821
Konarak	68,605	82,001	98,212
Lashar (Note: Separated from Nik Shahr County after the 2016 census)	—	—	—
Mehrestan (Note: Separated from Saravan County and Sarbaz County after the 2006 census)	—	62,756	70,579
Mirjaveh (Note: Separated from Zahedan County after the 2011 census)	—	—	45,357
Nik Shahr	185,355	212,963	141,894
Nimruz	—	—	48,471
Qasr-e Qand (Note: Separated from Chabahar County and Nik Shahr County after the 2011 census)	—	—	61,076
Rask (Note: Separated from Sarbaz County after the 2016 census)	—	—	—
Saravan	239,950	175,728	191,661
Sarbaz	162,960	164,557	186,165
Sib and Suran (Note: Separated from Saravan County after the 2006 census)	—	73,189	85,095
Taftan (Note: Separated from Khash County after the 2016 census)	—	—	—
Zabol	317,357	259,356	165,666
Zahedan	663,822	660,575	672,589
Zarabad (Note: Separated from Konarak County after the 2016 census)	—	—	—
Zehak	70,839	75,419	74,896
Total	2,349,049	2,534,327	2,775,014

== Cities ==
According to the 2016 census, 1,345,642 people (over 48% of the population of Sistan-Baluchestan province) live in the following cities:

City	Population
Adimi	3,613
Ali Akbar	4,779
Bampur	12,217
Bazman	5,192
Bent	5,822
Bonjar	3,760
Chabahar	106,739
Dust Mohammad	6,621
Espakeh	4,719
Fanuj	13,070
Galmurti	10,292
Gosht	4,992
Hiduj	1,674
Iranshahr	113,750
Jaleq	18,098
Khash	56,584
Konarak	43,258
Mehrestan	12,245
Mirjaveh	9,359
Mohammadabad	3,468
Mohammadan	10,302
Mohammadi	5,606
Negur	5,670
Nik Shahr	17,732
Nosratabad	5,238
Nukabad	5,261
Pishin	16,011
Qasr-e Qand	11,605
Rask	10,115
Saravan	60,014
Sarbaz	2,020
Sirkan	2,196
Suran	13,580
Zabol	134,950
Zahedan	587,730
Zarabad	4,003
Zehak	13,357

=== Top 10 cities by population ===
Rank	Name	Population (2016)
1	Zahedan	587,730
2	Zabol	134,950
3	Iranshahr	113,750
4	Chabahar	106,739
5	Saravan	60,014
6	Khash	56,584
7	Konarak	43,258
8	Jaleq	18,098
9	Nik Shahr	17,732
10	Pishin	16,011

== Geography ==
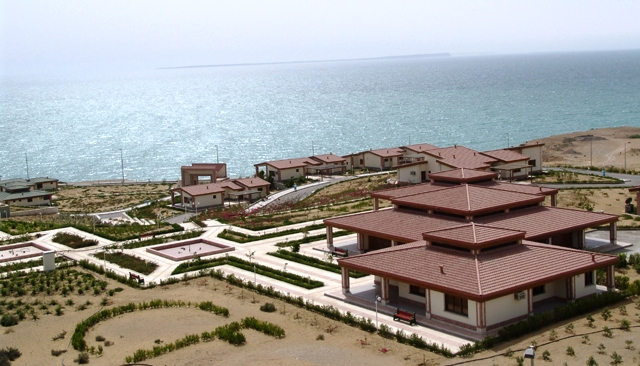
The southern coasts of the province along the Gulf of Oman

The whole of the province had previously been called Balochistan, but the government added Sistan to the end of Balochistan and it became Baluchestan and Sistan. After the 1979 Iranian revolution, the name of the province was changed to Sistan and Baluchestan.

Today, Sistan refers to the area comrising Zabol, Hamun, Hirmand, Zehak, and Nimruz Counties. The province borders South Khorasan province in the north, Kerman province and Hormozgan province in the west, the Gulf of Oman in the south, and Afghanistan and Pakistan in the east.

=== Climate ===
Sistan-Baluchestan province is one of the driest regions of Iran, with a slight increase in rainfall from east to west, and a rise in humidity in the coastal regions. The province is subject to seasonal winds from different directions, the most important of which are the "120-day wind" of Sistan, known in Balochi as Levar; the seventh wind (Gav-kosh); the south wind (Nambi); the Hooshak wind; the humid and seasonal winds of the Indian Ocean; the north wind (Gurich); and the western wind (Gard).

In 2023, the Sistan region was affected by several dust events, occurring in April, June, and August. The latter sent 1120 people to hospitals from 10 to 14 August. Winds reached a speed of 108 km/h (67 mph) in Zabol station and reduced visibility to 600 m (2,000 ft).

== Economy ==
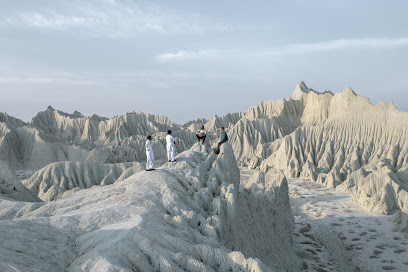
Mountains in Chabahar County

Sistan-Baluchestan is the poorest of Iran's 31 provinces, with a Human Development Index (HDI) score of 0.688. The government of Iran has been implementing new plans such as creating the Chabahar Free Trade-Industrial Zone (CFZ).

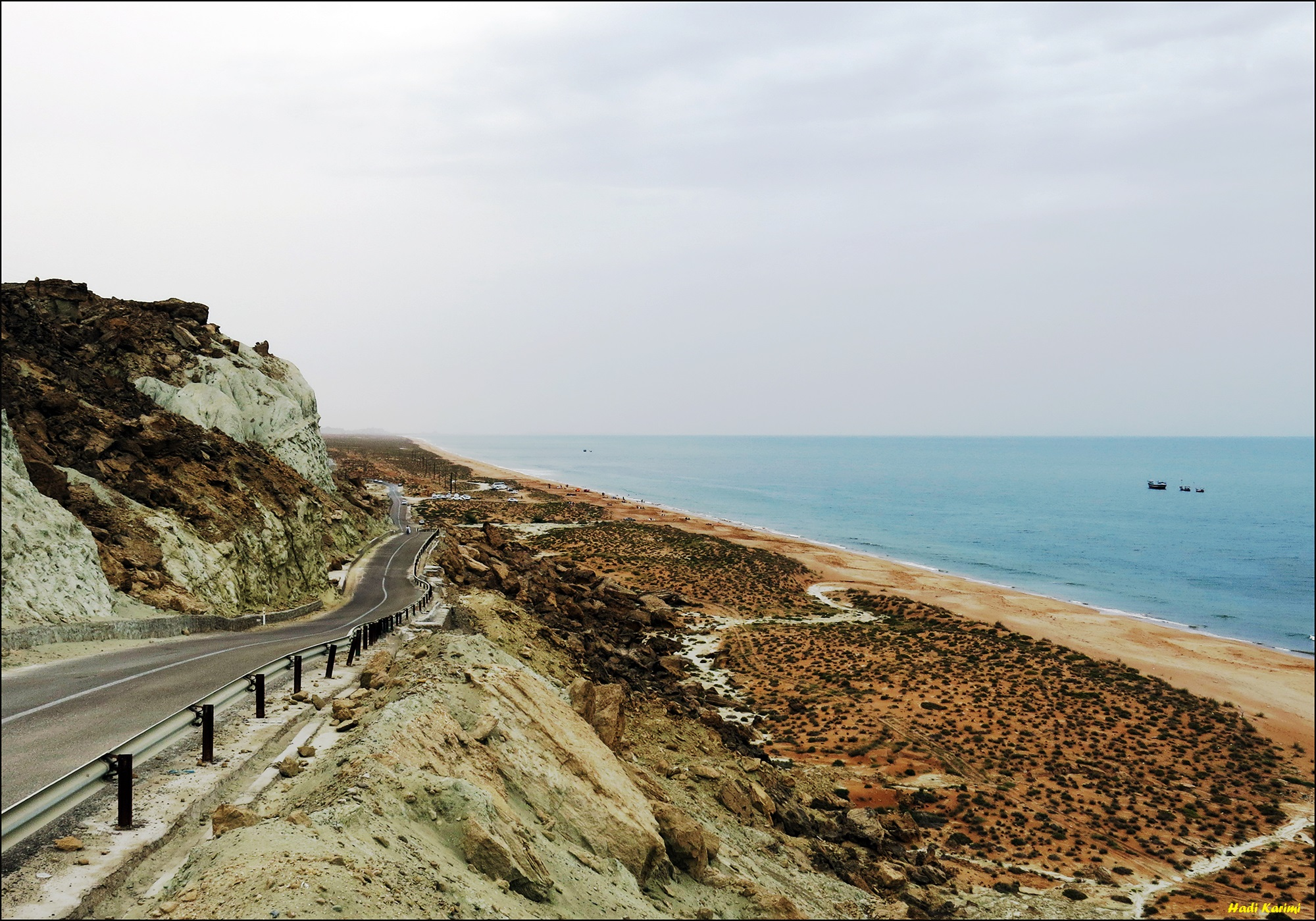
View of the Persian Gulf from Chabahar

Industry is new to the province. Efforts have been done and tax, customs and financial motivations have caused more industrial investment, new projects, new producing jobs, and improvement of industry. The most important factories are the Khash cement factory with production of 2600 tons cement daily.

The province has important geological and metal mineral potentials such as: chrome, copper, granite, antimony, talc, manganese, iron, lead, zinc, tin, nickel, platinum, gold, and silver.

One of the main mines in the province is the Chel Kooreh copper mine 120 km north of Zahedan.

Sistani embroidery has been an ancient handicraft of the region that has been traced as far back as 5th-century BC, originating from the Scythians.

== Transportation ==
=== National rail network ===
The city of Zahedan has been connected to Quetta in Pakistan for a century with a broad gauge railway. It has weekly trains for Kovaitah. Recently a railway from Bam to Zahedan has been inaugurated. There may be plans to build railway lines from Zahedan to Chabahar.

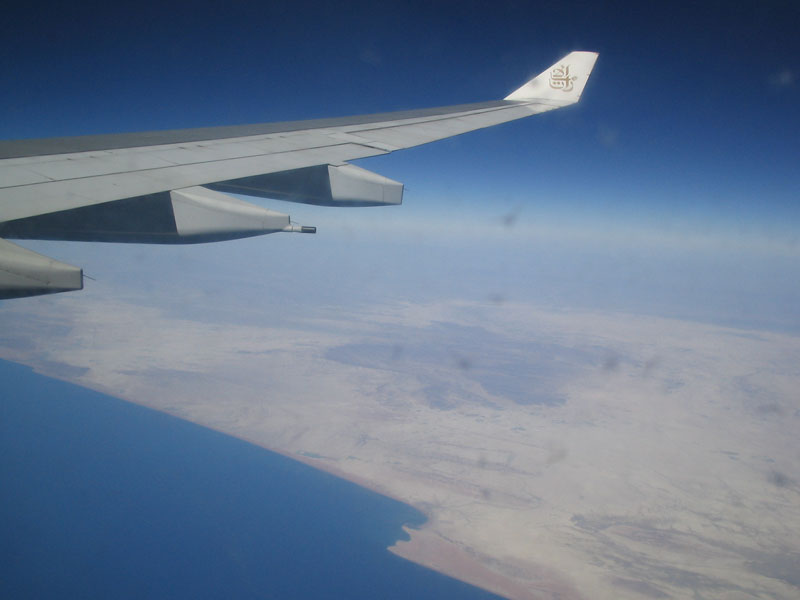
Aerial view of Beris on the Gulf of Oman.

=== Airports ===
Sistan-Baluchestan province has two main passenger airports:

- Zahedan Airport
- Chabahar Konarak Airport

=== Ports ===
The Port of Chabahar in the south of the province is the main port. It is to be connected by a new railway to Zahedan. India is investing on this port. The port stands on the coast of Makran and is 70 km west of Gwadar, Pakistan.

== Higher education ==
1. University of Sistan and Baluchestan
2. Chabahar Maritime University
3. Zabol University
4. Islamic Azad University of Iranshahr
5. Islamic Azad University of Zahedan
6. Zahedan University of Medical Sciences
7. Zabol University of Medical Sciences
8. International University of Chabahar
9. Velayat University of Iranshar
10. Jamiah Darul Uloom Zahedan

== Water ==
=== Shortage of water ===
Iran ranks among the most water stressed countries in the world. Sistan-Baluchestan province suffers from major water problems that were aggravated by corruption in Iran's water supply sector, lack of transparency, neglect of marginalized communities, and political favoritism. Water diversion projects in the Isfahan and Yazd provinces receive priority despite critical shortages in Khuzestan and Sistan-Baluchestan.

Iran's central government prioritizes water allocation for industrial and urban centers, often at the expense of rural and minority populations. These groups face severe water shortages, ecological degradation, and a loss of livelihoods. This pattern of unequal development not only exacerbates regional disparities but also fuels social unrest and environmental crises. Iran's water policy is also characterized by an overreliance on dam construction and large-scale diversion projects, primarily benefiting politically connected enterprises and urban elites.

==== IRGC involvement ====
The Islamic Revolutionary Guard Corps (IRGC) and other politically connected entities control water resources, prioritizing projects for political and economic gain rather than public need. They divert supplies to favored regions, causing shortages in vulnerable provinces like Khuzestan and Sistan-Baluchestan.

Reports also indicate that certain agricultural and industrial enterprises with ties to the IRGC have received significant amounts of water, while small farmers and rural communities struggle with severe shortages.

=== Outcome ===
This has led to the drying of rivers, wetlands, and other vital ecosystems, intensifying dust storms and land subsidence in regions like Khuzestan and Sistan-Baluchestan. Such environmental degradation, combined with insufficient governmental oversight and transparency, worsens living conditions for marginalized communities, reinforcing cycles of poverty and socio-political marginalization.

== Gallery ==
Landmarks such as the Firuzabad Castle, Rostam Castle, and the Naseri Castle are located in the province.

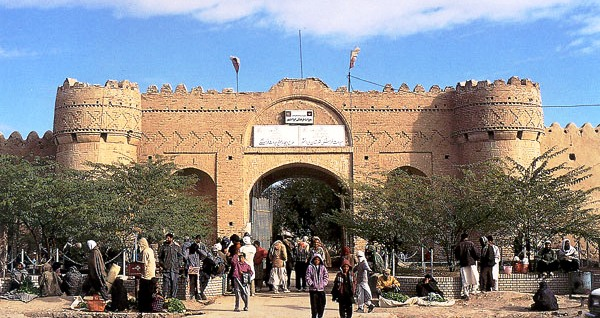
Naseri Castle, Iranshahr

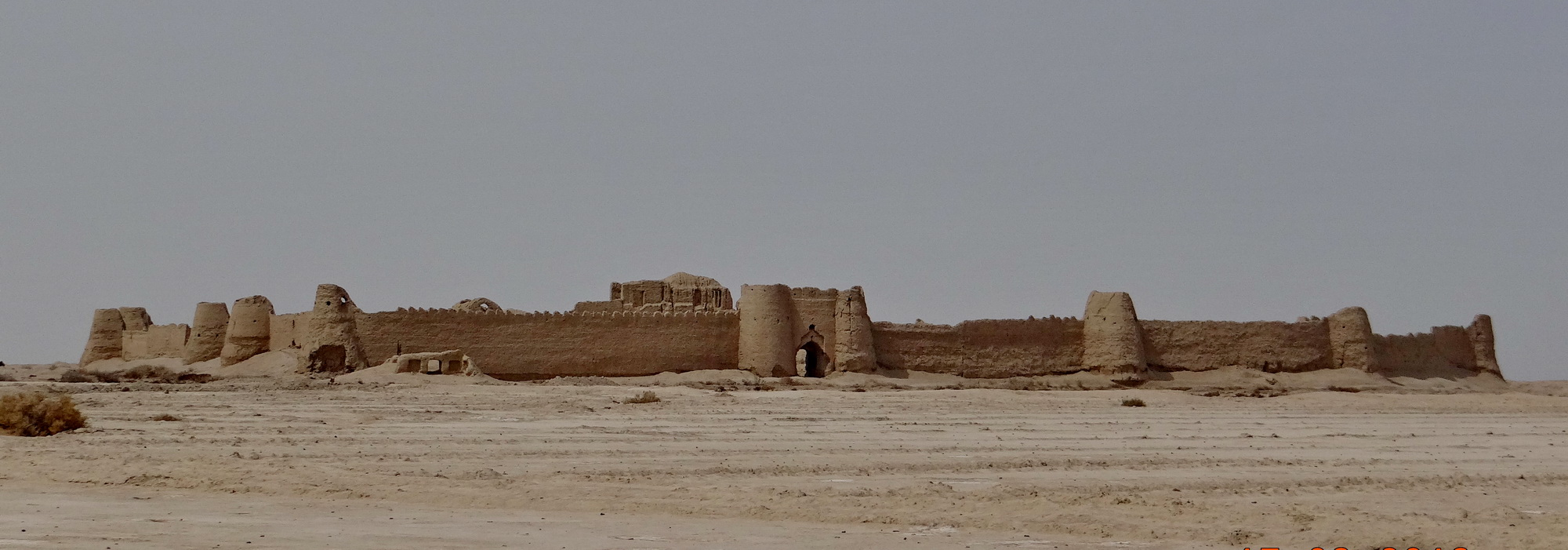
Rostam Castle, in Hamun County

== See also ==
- Bazman volcano
- Balochistan
  - Balochistan, Afghanistan
  - Balochistan, Pakistan
- Insurgency in Sistan and Baluchestan province
- List of cities in Sistan and Baluchestan province

== Bibliography ==
- W. Barthold (1984). "Sistan, the Southern Part of Afghanistan, and Baluchistan". An Historical Geography of Iran. Translated by Svat Soucek. Princeton University Press. pp. 64–86. ISBN 978-1-4008-5322-9.
- Kameel Ahmady (2019). From Border to Border: Comprehensive Research Study on Identity and Ethnicity in Iran. London: Mehri publication. ISBN 9781914165221.
