= Vashnam =

Vashnam or Veshnam or Voshnam (Persian: وشنام) may refer to:

- Vashnam-e Dari
- Vashnam-e Dust Mohammad
- Vashnam-e Eshaq
- Vashnam-e Faqir Mohammad
- Vashnam-e Hajji Ramazan
- Vashnam-e Heydar Saleh Zahi
- Vashnam-e Kheyr Mohammad
- Vashnam-e Mirgol
- Vashnam-e Morid
- Vashnam-e Shahdad
