= Gowmazi =

Gowmazi or Gumazi (Persian: گو مازي) may refer to:

- Gowmazi Faqir
- Gowmazi Jari
- Gowmazi Kowsar
- Gowmazi Osman
- Gowmazi Saleh
- Gowmazi Sanjar
