= Kambel =

Kambel or Kambal (Persian: کمبل) may refer to:

- Kambel Balad
- Kambel Dal Morad
- Kambel Karim Bakhsh
- Kambel Mohammad Azim
- Kambel-e Soleyman
- Kambel-e Soleyman Rural District
- Zunft zum Kämbel, a medieval Swiss guild
