= Chukat, Iran =

Chukat (Persian: چوكات), also rendered as Chaukat or Chokat or Chugat, in Iran may refer to:

- Chukat-e Abdol Karim Bazar
- Chukat-e Bala
- Chukat-e Pain
- Chukat-e Vasat
