= Dambdaf (disambiguation) =

Dambdaf is a village in Sistan and Baluchestan Province, Iran.

Dambdaf (Persian: دمبدف) may also refer to:

- Dambdaf-e Miran
- Dambdaf-e Moradi
- Dambdaf-e Osman
