= Nadekan =

Nadekan or Nadakan (Persian: ندکان), also rendered as Nadehkan or Nadeh Kan, may refer to:

- Nadekan-e Jami
- Nadekan-e Gurmi
- Nadekan-e Shafi Mohammad
- Nadekan-e Shahdad
