= Janmohammad Bazar =

Janmohammad Bazar جان محمدبازار
- Village
- Location within Iran
- Coordinates: 25°44′29″N 60°58′15″E
- Country: Iran
- Province: Sistan and Baluchestan
- County: Chabahar
- Bakhsh: Polan
- Rural District: Polan

Population (2006)
  - Total: 154
- Time zone: UTC+3:30 (IRST)
  - Summer (DST): UTC+4:30 (IRDT)

Janmohammad Bazar (Persian: جان محمدبازار, also Romanized as Jānmoḩammad Bāzār) is a village in Polan Rural District, Polan District, Chabahar County, Sistan and Baluchestan Province, Iran. At the 2006 census, its population was 154, in 27 families.
