= Ebrahim Hut Bazar =

Ebrahim Hut Bazar ابراهيم حوت بازار
- Village
- Location within Iran
- Coordinates: 25°35′14″N 61°03′43″E
- Country: Iran
- Province: Sistan and Baluchestan
- County: Chabahar
- Bakhsh: Polan
- Rural District: Polan

Population (2006)
  - Total: 392
- Time zone: UTC+3:30 (IRST)
  - Summer (DST): UTC+4:30 (IRDT)

Ebrahim Hut Bazar (Persian: ابراهيم حوت بازار, also Romanized as Ebrāhīm Ḩūt Bāzār; also known as Ebrāhīm Bāzār, Hot Qādir Bakhsh, Ḩūt-e Ebrāhīm, and Hūt-e Qadīr Bakhsh) is a village in Polan Rural District, Polan District, Chabahar County, Sistan and Baluchestan Province, Iran. At the 2006 census, its population was 392, in 83 families.
