= Mantaqeh Azad Chabahar =

Mantaqeh Azad Chabahar منطقه آزاد چابهار
- Village
- Country: Iran
- Province: Sistan and Baluchestan
- County: Chabahar
- Bakhsh: Central
- Rural District: Kambel-e Soleyman

Population (2006)
  - Total: 39
- Time zone: UTC+3:30 (IRST)
  - Summer (DST): UTC+4:30 (IRDT)

Mantaqeh Azad Chabahar (Persian: منطقه آزاد چابهار, also Romanized as Manţaqeh Āzād Chābahār) is a village in Kambel-e Soleyman Rural District, in the Central District of Chabahar County, Sistan and Baluchestan Province, Iran. At the 2006 census, its population was 39, in 11 families.
