= Beryani, Iran =

Beryani بریانی
- village
- Location within Iran
- Coordinates: 25°38′26″N 60°58′28″E
- Country: Iran
- Province: Sistan and Baluchestan
- County: Chabahar
- Bakhsh: Central
- Rural District: Pir Sohrab

Population (2006)
  - Total: 207
- Time zone: UTC+3:30 (IRST)
  - Summer (DST): UTC+4:30 (IRDT)

Beryani (Persian: بریانی, also Romanized as Beryānī and Bereyānī; also known as Jāmīzeh) is a village in Pir Sohrab Rural District, in the Central District of Chabahar County, Sistan and Baluchestan Province, Iran. At the 2006 census, its population was 207, in 32 families.
