= Regeti =

Regeti رگتي
- Village
- Location within Iran
- Coordinates: 25°46′09″N 60°52′21″E
- Country: Iran
- Province: Sistan and Baluchestan
- County: Chabahar
- Bakhsh: Central
- Rural District: Pir Sohrab

Population (2006)
  - Total: 303
- Time zone: UTC+3:30 (IRST)
  - Summer (DST): UTC+4:30 (IRDT)

Regeti (Persian: رگتي, also Romanized as Regetī; also known as Regetī-ye Pā‘īn and Rīgītī) is a village in Pir Sohrab Rural District, in the Central District of Chabahar County, Sistan and Baluchestan Province, Iran. At the 2006 census, its population was 303, in 57 families.
