= Khaneh Hay Chahar Shanbeh =

Khaneh Hay Chahar Shanbeh خانه هاي چهارشنبه
- Village
- Country: Iran
- Province: Sistan and Baluchestan
- County: Chabahar
- Bakhsh: Central
- Rural District: Kambel-e Soleyman

Population (2006)
  - Total: 399
- Time zone: UTC+3:30 (IRST)
  - Summer (DST): UTC+4:30 (IRDT)

Khaneh Hay Chahar Shanbeh (Persian: خانه هاي چهارشنبه, also Romanized as Khāneh Hāy-e Chahār Shanbeh) is a village in Kambel-e Soleyman Rural District, in the Central District of Chabahar County, Sistan and Baluchestan Province, Iran. At the 2006 census, its population was 399, in 79 families.
