= Isa Bazar =

Isa Bazar عيسي بازار
- Village
- Location within Iran
- Coordinates: 25°35′30″N 61°03′32″E
- Country: Iran
- Province: Sistan and Baluchestan
- County: Chabahar
- Bakhsh: Polan
- Rural District: Polan

Population (2006)
  - Total: 108
- Time zone: UTC+3:30 (IRST)
  - Summer (DST): UTC+4:30 (IRDT)

Isa Bazar (Persian: عيسي بازار, also Romanized as ʿĪsá Bāzār and Eesábāzār) is a village in Polan Rural District, Polan District, Chabahar County, Sistan and Baluchestan Province, Iran. At the 2006 census, its population was 108, in 19 families.
