= Bandgah-e Pir Sohrab =

Bandgah-e Pir Sohrab بندگاه پيرسهراب
- Village
- Location within Iran
- Coordinates: 25°43′25″N 60°52′33″E
- Country: Iran
- Province: Sistan and Baluchestan
- County: Chabahar
- Bakhsh: Central
- Rural District: Pir Sohrab

Population (2006)
  - Total: 275
- Time zone: UTC+3:30 (IRST)
  - Summer (DST): UTC+4:30 (IRDT)

Bandgah-e Pir Sohrab (Persian: بندگاه پيرسهراب, also Romanized as Bandgāh-e Pīr Sohrāb; also known as Pīr Sohrāb) is a village in Pir Sohrab Rural District, in the Central District of Chabahar County, Sistan and Baluchestan Province, Iran. At the 2006 census, its population was 275, in 56 families.
