= Owraki Malang Bazar =

Owraki Malang Bazar عوركي ملنگ بازار
- Village
- Country: Iran
- Province: Sistan and Baluchestan
- County: Chabahar
- Bakhsh: Central
- Rural District: Pir Sohrab

Population (2006)
  - Total: 129
- Time zone: UTC+3:30 (IRST)
  - Summer (DST): UTC+4:30 (IRDT)

Owraki Malang Bazar (Persian: عوركي ملنگ بازار, also Romanized as ʿOwrakī Malang Bāzār) is a village in Pir Sohrab Rural District, in the Central District of Chabahar County, Sistan and Baluchestan Province, Iran. At the 2006 census, its population was 129, in 31 families.
