= Gar Kandi =

Gar Kandi (Persian: گركندي or گار کندي) may refer to:

- Gar Kandi, Khuzestan (گركندي - Gar Kandī)
- Gar Kandi, Sistan and Baluchestan (گار کندي - Gār Kandī)
- Gar Kandi Rasul Bakhsh Bazar, Sistan and Baluchestan Province
