= Yar Mohammad Bazar =

Yar Mohammad Bazar يارمحمدبازار
- Village
- Location within Iran
- Coordinates: 25°34′58″N 61°05′07″E
- Country: Iran
- Province: Sistan and Baluchestan
- County: Chabahar
- Bakhsh: Polan
- Rural District: Polan

Population (2006)
  - Total: 103
- Time zone: UTC+3:30 (IRST)
  - Summer (DST): UTC+4:30 (IRDT)

Yar Mohammad Bazar (Persian: يارمحمدبازار, also Romanized as Yār Moḩammad Bāzār) is a village in Polan Rural District, Polan District, Chabahar County, Sistan and Baluchestan Province, Iran. At the 2006 census, its population was 103, in 17 families.
