= Dajdad-e Khoda =

Dajdad-e Khoda دج دادخدا
- Village
- Location within Iran
- Coordinates: 25°34′41″N 60°54′08″E
- Country: Iran
- Province: Sistan and Baluchestan
- County: Chabahar
- Bakhsh: Central
- Rural District: Pir Sohrab

Population (2006)
  - Total: 52
- Time zone: UTC+3:30 (IRST)
  - Summer (DST): UTC+4:30 (IRDT)

Dajdad-e Khoda (Persian: دج دادخدا, also Romanized as Dajdād-e Khodā) is a village in Pir Sohrab Rural District, in the Central District of Chabahar County, Sistan and Baluchestan Province, Iran. At the 2006 census, its population was 52, in 11 families.
