= Hoseyn Zehi =

Hoseyn Zehi حسين زهي
- Village
- Location within Iran
- Coordinates: 25°40′04″N 60°58′04″E
- Country: Iran
- Province: Sistan and Baluchestan
- County: Chabahar
- Bakhsh: Central
- Rural District: Pir Sohrab

Population (2006)
  - Total: 325
- Time zone: UTC+3:30 (IRST)
  - Summer (DST): UTC+4:30 (IRDT)

Hoseyn Zehi (Persian: حسين زهي, also Romanized as Ḩoseyn Zehī, Ḩoseyn Zāhī, and Ḩoseyn-e Zehī; also known as Ḩoseyn-e Zāy, Ḩoseyn Zā’ī, and Husanzai) is a village in Pir Sohrab Rural District, in the Central District of Chabahar County, Sistan and Baluchestan Province, Iran. At the 2006 census, its population was 325, in 54 families.
