= Jama Zehi Kuh Dim =

Jama Zehi Kuh Dim جما زهي کوه ديم
- Village
- Location within Iran
- Coordinates: 25°35′14″N 61°12′39″E
- Country: Iran
- Province: Sistan and Baluchestan
- County: Chabahar
- Bakhsh: Polan
- Rural District: Polan

Population (2006)
  - Total: 239
- Time zone: UTC+3:30 (IRST)
  - Summer (DST): UTC+4:30 (IRDT)

Jama Zehi Kuh Dim (Persian: جما زهي کوه ديم, also Romanized as Jamā Zehī Kūh Dīm; also known as Faqīr Moḩammad Bāzār) is a village in Polan Rural District, Polan District, Chabahar County, Sistan and Baluchestan Province, Iran. At the 2006 census, its population was 239, in 39 families.
