= Towlak Rud =

Towlak Rud تولك رود
- Village
- Location within Iran
- Coordinates: 25°46′43″N 60°47′44″E
- Country: Iran
- Province: Sistan and Baluchestan
- County: Chabahar
- Bakhsh: Central
- Rural District: Pir Sohrab

Population (2006)
  - Total: 95
- Time zone: UTC+3:30 (IRST)
  - Summer (DST): UTC+4:30 (IRDT)

Towlak Rud (Persian: تولك رود, also Romanized as Towlak Rūd; also known as Towlagrūd) is a village in Pir Sohrab Rural District, in the Central District of Chabahar County, Sistan and Baluchestan Province, Iran. At the 2006 census, its population was 95, in 18 families.
