= Owraki Molla Abdol Rahman =

Ouraki Molla Abdol Rahman عوركی ملاعبدالرحمان
- Village
- Country: Iran
- Province: Sistan and Baluchestan
- County: Chabahar
- Bakhsh: Central
- Rural District: Pir Sohrab

Population (2006)
  - Total: 377
- Time zone: UTC+3:30 (IRST)
  - Summer (DST): UTC+4:30 (IRDT)

Ouraki Molla Abdol Rahman (Persian: عوركی ملاعبدالرحمان, also Romanized as ʿOurakī Mollā ʿAbdol Raḩmān) is a village in Pir Sohrab Rural District, in the Central District of Chabahar County, Sistan and Baluchestan Province, Iran. At the 2006 census, its population was 377, in 65 families.
