= Solur Bazar =

Solur Bazar سلوربازار
- Village
- Location within Iran
- Coordinates: 25°35′25″N 61°04′14″E
- Country: Iran
- Province: Sistan and Baluchestan
- County: Chabahar
- Bakhsh: Polan
- Rural District: Polan

Population (2006)
  - Total: 244
- Time zone: UTC+3:30 (IRST)
  - Summer (DST): UTC+4:30 (IRDT)

Solur Bazar (Persian: سلوربازار, also Romanized as Solūr Bāzār; also known as Sowlūr Bāzār) is a village in Polan Rural District, Polan District, Chabahar County, Sistan and Baluchestan Province, Iran. At the 2006 census, its population was 244, in 51 families.
