= Fath Ali Kalat =

Fath Ali Kalat فتحعلي كلات
- Village
- Location within Iran
- Coordinates: 25°43′37″N 60°54′00″E
- Country: Iran
- Province: Sistan and Baluchestan
- County: Chabahar
- Bakhsh: Central
- Rural District: Pir Sohrab

Population (2006)
  - Total: 299
- Time zone: UTC+3:30 (IRST)
  - Summer (DST): UTC+4:30 (IRDT)

Fath Ali Kalat (Persian: فتحعلي كلات, also Romanized as Fatḩ ‘Alī Kalāt; also known as Fatīlāt Kalāt, Faţīlī Kalāt, Qal‘eh Fateh Ali, and Qal‘eh-ye Fatḩ ‘Alī) is a village in Pir Sohrab Rural District, in the Central District of Chabahar County, Sistan and Baluchestan Province, Iran. At the 2006 census, its population was 299, in 43 families.
