= Rig Band Sar =

Rig Band Sar ريگ بندسر
- Village
- Location within Iran
- Coordinates: 25°39′02″N 61°00′23″E
- Country: Iran
- Province: Sistan and Baluchestan
- County: Chabahar
- Bakhsh: Central
- Rural District: Pir Sohrab

Population (2006)
  - Total: 43
- Time zone: UTC+3:30 (IRST)
  - Summer (DST): UTC+4:30 (IRDT)

Rig Band Sar (Persian: ريگ بندسر, also Romanized as Rīg Band Sar; also known as Rīg Sar) is a village in Pir Sohrab Rural District, in the Central District of Chabahar County, Sistan and Baluchestan Province, Iran. At the 2006 census, its population was 43, in 9 families.
