= Owraki Bozorg-e Olya =

Village in Sistan and Baluchestan province, Iran

Owraki Bozorg-e Olya Persian: عورکي بزرگ عليا
- Village
- Location within Iran
- Coordinates: 25°43′38″N 60°56′18″E
- Country: Iran
- Province: Sistan and Baluchestan
- County: Chabahar
- District: Pir Sohrab
- Rural District: Pir Sohrab

Population (2016)
  - Total: 1,770
- Time zone: UTC+3:30 (IRST)

Owraki Bozorg-e Olya (Persian: عورکي بزرگ عليا) (Note: Also romanized as ʿOwrakī Bozorg-e ‘Olyā and Owrakībozorg-e ‘Olyā) is a village in, and the capital of, Pir Sohrab Rural District of Pir Sohrab District, Chabahar County, (Note: Formerly Chah Bahar County) Sistan and Baluchestan province, Iran. The previous capital of the rural district was the village of Pir Sohrab.

== Demographics ==
=== Population ===
At the time of the 2006 National Census, the village's population was 1,215 in 251 households, when it was in the Central District. The following census in 2011 counted 1,632 people in 335 households. The 2016 census measured the population of the village as 1,770 people in 404 households. It was the most populous village in its rural district.

After the census, the rural district was separated from the district in the establishment of Pir Sohrab District.
