= Mowla Bakhsh Bazar =

Mowla Bakhsh Bazar مولابخش بازار
- Village
- Location within Iran
- Coordinates: 25°34′34″N 61°08′59″E
- Country: Iran
- Province: Sistan and Baluchestan
- County: Chabahar
- Bakhsh: Polan
- Rural District: Polan

Population (2006)
  - Total: 272
- Time zone: UTC+3:30 (IRST)
  - Summer (DST): UTC+4:30 (IRDT)

Mowla Bakhsh Bazar (Persian: مولابخش بازار, also Romanized as Mowlā Bakhsh Bāzār; also known as Mollābakhsh Bāzār) is a village in Polan Rural District, Polan District, Chabahar County, Sistan and Baluchestan Province, Iran. At the 2006 census, its population was 272, in 52 families.
