= Dad Mohammad Abih =

Dad Mohammad Abih دادمحمدابيه
- Village
- Country: Iran
- Province: Sistan and Baluchestan
- County: Chabahar
- Bakhsh: Central
- Rural District: Pir Sohrab

Population (2006)
  - Total: 14
- Time zone: UTC+3:30 (IRST)
  - Summer (DST): UTC+4:30 (IRDT)

Dad Mohammad Abih (Persian: دادمحمدابيه, also Romanized as Dād Moḩammad Ābīh) is a village in Pir Sohrab Rural District, in the Central District of Chabahar County, Sistan and Baluchestan Province, Iran. At the 2006 census, its population was 14, in 4 families.
