= Parumi Hajji Heydar =

Parumi Hajji Heydar پرومی حاجی حیدر
- Village
- Location within Iran
- Coordinates: 25°26′37″N 60°54′29″E
- Country: Iran
- Province: Sistan and Baluchestan
- County: Chabahar
- Bakhsh: Central
- Rural District: Kambel-e Soleyman

Population (2006)
  - Total: 346
- Time zone: UTC+3:30 (IRST)
  - Summer (DST): UTC+4:30 (IRDT)

Parumi Hajji Heydar (Persian: پرومی حاجی حیدر, also Romanized as Parūmī Ḩājjī Ḩeydar; also known as Bārūmī, Borūmī, Pārūmī, and Pārūmīg) is a village in Kambel-e Soleyman Rural District, in the Central District of Chabahar County, Sistan and Baluchestan Province, Iran. At the 2006 census, its population was 346, in 68 families.
