= Palani, Iran =

Palani پلاني
- Village
- Location within Iran
- Coordinates: 25°21′28″N 60°49′56″E
- Country: Iran
- Province: Sistan and Baluchestan
- County: Chabahar
- Bakhsh: Central
- Rural District: Kambel-e Soleyman

Population (2006)
  - Total: 344
- Time zone: UTC+3:30 (IRST)
  - Summer (DST): UTC+4:30 (IRDT)

Palani (Persian: پلاني, also Romanized as Pālānī and Pelānī) is a village in Kambel-e Soleyman Rural District, in the Central District of Chabahar County, Sistan and Baluchestan Province, Iran. At the 2006 census, its population was 344, in 71 families.
