= Eshaq Bazar =

Eshaq Bazar اسحاق بازار
- Village
- Location within Iran
- Coordinates: 25°39′57″N 60°57′53″E
- Country: Iran
- Province: Sistan and Baluchestan
- County: Chabahar
- Bakhsh: Central
- Rural District: Pir Sohrab

Population (2006)
  - Total: 724
- Time zone: UTC+3:30 (IRST)
  - Summer (DST): UTC+4:30 (IRDT)

Eshaq Bazar (Persian: اسحاق بازار, also Romanized as Esḩāq Bāzār; also known as E’sḩag Bāzār) is a village in Pir Sohrab Rural District, in the Central District of Chabahar County, Sistan and Baluchestan Province, Iran. At the 2006 census, its population was 724, in 144 families.
