= Delmorad Bazar =

Delmorad Bazar دلمرادبازار
- Village
- Location within Iran
- Coordinates: 25°35′29″N 61°12′33″E
- Country: Iran
- Province: Sistan and Baluchestan
- County: Chabahar
- Bakhsh: Polan
- Rural District: Polan

Population (2006)
  - Total: 356
- Time zone: UTC+3:30 (IRST)
  - Summer (DST): UTC+4:30 (IRDT)

Delmorad Bazar (Persian: دلمرادبازار, also Romanized as Delmorād Bāzār; also known as Ḩāj Del Morād Bāzār and Ḩājj Del Morād Bāzār) is a village in Polan Rural District, Polan District, Chabahar County, Sistan and Baluchestan Province, Iran. At the 2006 census, its population was 356, in 70 families.
