= Polkan, Iran =

Polkan پلکان
- Village
- Location within Iran
- Coordinates: 25°34′51″N 61°05′09″E
- Country: Iran
- Province: Sistan and Baluchestan
- County: Chabahar
- Bakhsh: Polan
- Rural District: Polan

Population (2006)
  - Total: 230
- Time zone: UTC+3:30 (IRST)
  - Summer (DST): UTC+4:30 (IRDT)

Polkan (Persian: پلکان, also Romanized as Polkān) is a village in Polan Rural District, Polan District, Chabahar County, Sistan and Baluchestan Province, Iran. At the 2006 census, its population was 230, in 48 families.
