= Dadallah-e Bazar =

Dadallah-e Bazar داد الله بازار
- Village
- Location within Iran
- Coordinates: 25°39′13″N 60°58′57″E
- Country: Iran
- Province: Sistan and Baluchestan
- County: Chabahar
- Bakhsh: Central
- Rural District: Pir Sohrab

Population (2006)
  - Total: 122
- Time zone: UTC+3:30 (IRST)
  - Summer (DST): UTC+4:30 (IRDT)

Dadallah-e Bazar (Persian: داد الله بازار, also Romanized as Dādāllah-e Bāzār) is a village in Pir Sohrab Rural District, in the Central District of Chabahar County, Sistan and Baluchestan Province, Iran. In the 2006 census, its population was 122 people, in 22 families.
