= Sumarbar =

Sumarbar سوماربار
- Village
- Location within Iran
- Coordinates: 25°38′33″N 61°03′05″E
- Country: Iran
- Province: Sistan and Baluchestan
- County: Chabahar
- Bakhsh: Polan
- Rural District: Polan

Population (2006)
  - Total: 263
- Time zone: UTC+3:30 (IRST)
  - Summer (DST): UTC+4:30 (IRDT)

Sumarbar (Persian: سوماربار, also Romanized as Sūmārbār) is a village in Polan Rural District, Polan District, Chabahar County, Sistan and Baluchestan Province, Iran. At the 2006 census, its population was 263, in 43 families.
