= Osman Bazar =

Osman Bazar or Osmanbazar (Persian: عثمان بازار) may refer to:

- Osmanbazar, Chabahar
- Osman Bazar, Polan, Chabahar County
- Osman Bazar, alternate name of Bajar Bazar, Chabahar County
