= Faqir Bazar =

Faqir Bazar فقيربازار
- Village
- Location within Iran
- Coordinates: 25°35′03″N 61°04′46″E
- Country: Iran
- Province: Sistan and Baluchestan
- County: Chabahar
- Bakhsh: Polan
- Rural District: Polan

Population (2006)
  - Total: 148
- Time zone: UTC+3:30 (IRST)
  - Summer (DST): UTC+4:30 (IRDT)

Faqir Bazar (Persian: فقيربازار, also Romanized as Faqīr Bāzār) is a village in Polan Rural District, Polan District, Chabahar County, Sistan and Baluchestan Province, Iran. At the 2006 census, its population was 148, in 26 families.
