= Gurankesh =

Gurankesh or Gowran Kash or Guran Kesh or Gurankosh or Guran Kosh (Persian: گورانكش), also rendered as Goran Kash or Kurankoch or Kurankosh or Kuran Kash, may refer to:

- Gurankesh-e Abd ol Rahman
- Gurankesh-e Jamaat
- Gurankesh-e Molla Goharam
