= Sumar Zehi =

Sumar Zehi سومارزهي
- Village
- Location within Iran
- Coordinates: 25°36′34″N 61°06′40″E
- Country: Iran
- Province: Sistan and Baluchestan
- County: Chabahar
- Bakhsh: Polan
- Rural District: Polan

Population (2006)
  - Total: 174
- Time zone: UTC+3:30 (IRST)
  - Summer (DST): UTC+4:30 (IRDT)

Sumar Zehi (Persian: سومارزهي, also Romanized as Sūmār Zehī; also known as Sūmarzī) is a village in Polan Rural District, Polan District, Chabahar County, Sistan and Baluchestan Province, Iran. At the 2006 census, its population was 174, in 32 families.
