= Dajdagaru =

Dajdagaru دج دگارو
- Village
- Location within Iran
- Coordinates: 25°35′10″N 60°51′27″E
- Country: Iran
- Province: Sistan and Baluchestan
- County: Chabahar
- Bakhsh: Central
- Rural District: Pir Sohrab

Population (2006)
  - Total: 169
- Time zone: UTC+3:30 (IRST)
  - Summer (DST): UTC+4:30 (IRDT)

Dajdagaru (Persian: دج دگارو, also Romanized as Dajdagārū) is a village in Pir Sohrab Rural District, in the Central District of Chabahar County, Sistan and Baluchestan Province, Iran. At the 2006 census, its population was 169, in 30 families.
