= Zir Daj =

Zir Daj زيردج
- Village
- Location within Iran
- Coordinates: 25°35′33″N 60°54′01″E
- Country: Iran
- Province: Sistan and Baluchestan
- County: Chabahar
- Bakhsh: Central
- Rural District: Pir Sohrab

Population (2006)
  - Total: 203
- Time zone: UTC+3:30 (IRST)
  - Summer (DST): UTC+4:30 (IRDT)

Zir Daj (Persian: زيردج, also Romanized as Zīr Daj; also known as Cher Daj, Daj, Jerdaj, and Jīrdaj) is a village in Pir Sohrab Rural District, in the Central District of Chabahar County, Sistan and Baluchestan Province, Iran. At the 2006 census, its population was 203, in 34 families.
