= Kursar =

Kursar کورثر
- Village
- Location within Iran
- Coordinates: 25°35′57″N 61°07′43″E
- Country: Iran
- Province: Sistan and Baluchestan
- County: Chabahar
- Bakhsh: Polan
- Rural District: Polan

Population (2006)
  - Total: 200
- Time zone: UTC+3:30 (IRST)
  - Summer (DST): UTC+4:30 (IRDT)

Kursar (Persian: کورثر, also Romanized as Kūrs̄ar) is a village in Polan Rural District, Polan District, Chabahar County, Sistan and Baluchestan Province, Iran. At the 2006 census, its population was 200, in 33 families.
