= Qanbar Zehi =

Qanbar Zehi قنبرزهي
- Village
- Location within Iran
- Coordinates: 25°35′11″N 61°05′05″E
- Country: Iran
- Province: Sistan and Baluchestan
- County: Chabahar
- Bakhsh: Polan
- Rural District: Polan

Population (2006)
  - Total: 174
- Time zone: UTC+3:30 (IRST)
  - Summer (DST): UTC+4:30 (IRDT)

Qanbar Zehi (Persian: قنبرزهي, also Romanized as Qanbar Zehī) is a village in Polan Rural District, Polan District, Chabahar County, Sistan and Baluchestan Province, Iran. At the 2006 census, its population was 174, in 33 families.
