= Aydow Bazar =

Aydow Bazar عيدو بازار
- Village
- Location within Iran
- Coordinates: 25°36′57″N 61°05′04″E
- Country: Iran
- Province: Sistan and Baluchestan
- County: Chabahar
- Bakhsh: Polan
- Rural District: Polan

Population (2006)
  - Total: 269
- Time zone: UTC+3:30 (IRST)
  - Summer (DST): UTC+4:30 (IRDT)

Aydow Bazar (Persian: عيدو بازار, also Romanized as ʿAydow Bāzār and Aydowbāzār) is a village in Polan Rural District, Polan District, Chabahar County, Sistan and Baluchestan Province, Iran. At the 2006 census, its population was 269, in 54 families.
