= Arab Zehi =

Arab Zehi عرب زهي
- Village
- Location within Iran
- Coordinates: 25°37′40″N 61°01′32″E
- Country: Iran
- Province: Sistan and Baluchestan
- County: Chabahar
- Bakhsh: Polan
- Rural District: Polan

Population (2006)
  - Total: 121
- Time zone: UTC+3:30 (IRST)
  - Summer (DST): UTC+4:30 (IRDT)

Arab Zehi (Persian: عرب زهي, also Romanized as ‘Arab Zehī; also known as ‘Arab Zā’ī and ‘Arabzī) is a village in Polan Rural District, Polan District, Chabahar County, Sistan and Baluchestan Province, Iran. At the 2006 census, its population was 121, in 19 families.
