= Bangelzehi =

Bangelzehi بنگل زهي
- Village
- Location within Iran
- Coordinates: 25°34′47″N 61°08′43″E
- Country: Iran
- Province: Sistan and Baluchestan
- County: Chabahar
- Bakhsh: Polan
- Rural District: Polan

Population (2006)
  - Total: 293
- Time zone: UTC+3:30 (IRST)
  - Summer (DST): UTC+4:30 (IRDT)

Bangelzehi (Persian: بنگل زهي, also Romanized as Bangelzehī; also known as Bagol Zā’ī and Bangolzī) is a village in Polan Rural District, Polan District, Chabahar County, Sistan and Baluchestan Province, Iran. At the 2006 census, its population was 293, in 54 families.
