= Jama Zehi =

Jama Zehi جمازهي
- Village
- Location within Iran
- Coordinates: 25°35′32″N 61°02′03″E
- Country: Iran
- Province: Sistan and Baluchestan
- County: Chabahar
- Bakhsh: Polan
- Rural District: Polan

Population (2006)
  - Total: 60
- Time zone: UTC+3:30 (IRST)
  - Summer (DST): UTC+4:30 (IRDT)

Jama Zehi (Persian: جمازهي, also Romanized as Jamā Zehī; also known as Jamāzī, Jomāzī, and Jommāzī) is a village in Polan Rural District, Polan District, Chabahar County, Sistan and Baluchestan Province, Iran. At the 2006 census, its population was 60, in 14 families.
