= Sar Daj Delmorad =

Sar Daj Delmorad سردج دلمراد
- Village
- Location within Iran
- Coordinates: 25°35′15″N 60°50′05″E
- Country: Iran
- Province: Sistan and Baluchestan
- County: Chabahar
- Bakhsh: Central
- Rural District: Pir Sohrab

Population (2006)
  - Total: 78
- Time zone: UTC+3:30 (IRST)
  - Summer (DST): UTC+4:30 (IRDT)

Sar Daj Delmorad (Persian: سردج دلمراد, also Romanized as Sar Daj Delmorād; also known as Dej, Sar Daj, and Sar Dej) is a village in Pir Sohrab Rural District, in the Central District of Chabahar County, Sistan and Baluchestan Province, Iran. At the 2006 census, its population was 78, in 14 families.
