= Band-e Osman Bazar =

Band-e Osman Bazar بندعثمان بازار
- Village
- Country: Iran
- Province: Sistan and Baluchestan
- County: Chabahar
- Bakhsh: Central
- Rural District: Pir Sohrab

Population (2006)
  - Total: 319
- Time zone: UTC+3:30 (IRST)
  - Summer (DST): UTC+4:30 (IRDT)

Band-e Osman Bazar (Persian: بندعثمان بازار, also Romanized as Band-e ʿOs̄mān Bāzār) is a village in Pir Sohrab Rural District, in the Central District of Chabahar County, Sistan and Baluchestan Province, Iran. At the 2006 census, its population was 319, in 56 families.
