= Faqir Zehi =

Faqir Zehi (Persian: فقيرزهي) may refer to:

- Faqir Zehi Khan Mohammad Bazar
- Faqir Zehi Morad Bazar
- Faqir Zehi Nur Mohammad
