= Radudaj =

Radudaj رادودج
- Village
- Location within Iran
- Coordinates: 25°37′07″N 60°55′55″E
- Country: Iran
- Province: Sistan and Baluchestan
- County: Chabahar
- Bakhsh: Central
- Rural District: Pir Sohrab

Population (2006)
  - Total: 620
- Time zone: UTC+3:30 (IRST)
  - Summer (DST): UTC+4:30 (IRDT)

Radudaj (Persian: رادودج, also Romanized as Rādūdaj) is a village in Pir Sohrab Rural District, in the Central District of Chabahar County, Sistan and Baluchestan Province, Iran. At the 2006 census, its population was 620, in 113 families.
