= Niambit =

Niambit نيام بيت
- Village
- Location within Iran
- Coordinates: 25°45′00″N 60°48′00″E
- Country: Iran
- Province: Sistan and Baluchestan
- County: Chabahar
- Bakhsh: Central
- Rural District: Pir Sohrab

Population (2006)
  - Total: 156
- Time zone: UTC+3:30 (IRST)
  - Summer (DST): UTC+4:30 (IRDT)

Niambit (Persian: نيام بيت, also Romanized as Nīāmbīt; also known as Nāmbīt) is a village in Pir Sohrab Rural District, in the Central District of Chabahar County, Sistan and Baluchestan Province, Iran. At the 2006 census, its population was 156, in 24 families.
