= Mohammad Zehi =

Mohammad Zehi محمدزهي
- Village
- Location within Iran
- Coordinates: 25°36′06″N 61°05′28″E
- Country: Iran
- Province: Sistan and Baluchestan
- County: Chabahar
- Bakhsh: Polan
- Rural District: Polan

Population (2006)
  - Total: 594
- Time zone: UTC+3:30 (IRST)
  - Summer (DST): UTC+4:30 (IRDT)

Mohammad Zehi (Persian: محمدزهي, also Romanized as Moḩammad Zehī; also known as Moḩammad Zā’ī and Moḩammadzī) is a village in Polan Rural District, Polan District, Chabahar County, Sistan and Baluchestan Province, Iran. At the 2006 census, its population was 594, in 112 families.
