= Bazar Pir Mohammad =

Bazar Pir Mohammad بازار پيرمحمد
- Village
- Country: Iran
- Province: Sistan and Baluchestan
- County: Chabahar
- Bakhsh: Central
- Rural District: Pir Sohrab

Population (2006)
  - Total: 30
- Time zone: UTC+3:30 (IRST)
  - Summer (DST): UTC+4:30 (IRDT)

Bazar Pir Mohammad (Persian: بازار پيرمحمد, also Romanized as Bāzār Pīr Moḩammad) is a village in Pir Sohrab Rural District, in the Central District of Chabahar County, Sistan and Baluchestan Province, Iran. At the 2006 census, its population was 30, in 6 families.
