= Bi Ban Zehi =

Bi Ban Zehi بي بان زهي
- Village
- Location within Iran
- Coordinates: 25°42′03″N 60°55′02″E
- Country: Iran
- Province: Sistan and Baluchestan
- County: Chabahar
- Bakhsh: Central
- Rural District: Pir Sohrab

Population (2006)
  - Total: 433
- Time zone: UTC+3:30 (IRST)
  - Summer (DST): UTC+4:30 (IRDT)

Bi Ban Zehi (Persian: بي بان زهي, also Romanized as Bī Bān Zehī) is a village in Pir Sohrab Rural District, in the Central District of Chabahar County, Sistan and Baluchestan Province, Iran. At the 2006 census, its population was 433, in 78 families.
