= Sina Chu =

Sina Chu سيناچو
- Village
- Location within Iran
- Coordinates: 25°39′01″N 60°55′37″E
- Country: Iran
- Province: Sistan and Baluchestan
- County: Chabahar
- Bakhsh: Central
- Rural District: Pir Sohrab

Population (2006)
  - Total: 25
- Time zone: UTC+3:30 (IRST)
  - Summer (DST): UTC+4:30 (IRDT)

Sina Chu (Persian: سيناچو, also Romanized as Sīnā Chū and Sīnā Chow) is a village in Pir Sohrab Rural District, in the Central District of Chabahar County, Sistan and Baluchestan Province, Iran. At the 2006 census, its population was 25, in 5 families.
