= Digru =

Digru ديگ رو
- Village
- Location within Iran
- Coordinates: 25°38′42″N 61°00′55″E
- Country: Iran
- Province: Sistan and Baluchestan
- County: Chabahar
- Bakhsh: Polan
- Rural District: Polan

Population (2006)
  - Total: 164
- Time zone: UTC+3:30 (IRST)
  - Summer (DST): UTC+4:30 (IRDT)

Digru (Persian: ديگ رو, also romanized as Dīgrū; also known as Degrū) is a village in Polan Rural District, Polan District, Chabahar County, Sistan and Baluchestan Province, Iran. At the 2006 census, its population was 164, in 27 families.
