= Hushom =

Hushom حوشم
- Village
- Location within Iran
- Coordinates: 25°46′01″N 60°47′34″E
- Country: Iran
- Province: Sistan and Baluchestan
- County: Chabahar
- Bakhsh: Central
- Rural District: Pir Sohrab

Population (2006)
  - Total: 245
- Time zone: UTC+3:30 (IRST)
  - Summer (DST): UTC+4:30 (IRDT)

Hushom (Persian: حوشم, also Romanized as Ḩūshom; also known as Hūshomb and Hūshomb-e Bālā) is a village in Pir Sohrab Rural District, in the Central District of Chabahar County, Sistan and Baluchestan Province, Iran. At the 2006 census, its population was 245, in 41 families.
