= Abdu Zehi =

Abdu Zehi عبدوزهي
- Village
- Location within Iran
- Coordinates: 25°36′13″N 61°09′47″E
- Country: Iran
- Province: Sistan and Baluchestan
- County: Chabahar
- Bakhsh: Polan
- Rural District: Polan

Population (2006)
  - Total: 552
- Time zone: UTC+3:30 (IRST)
  - Summer (DST): UTC+4:30 (IRDT)

Abdu Zehi (Persian: عبدوزهي, also Romanized as ʿAbdū Zehī; also known as ‘Abdī Zā’ī, ‘Abdī Zehī, ‘Abdīzehī, ‘Abdozī, and ‘Abd Zehī) is a village in Polan Rural District, Polan District, Chabahar County, Sistan and Baluchestan Province, Iran. At the 2006 census, its population was 552, in 97 families.
