= Morad Bazar =

Morad Bazar مرادبازار
- Village
- Location within Iran
- Coordinates: 25°34′46″N 61°06′10″E
- Country: Iran
- Province: Sistan and Baluchestan
- County: Chabahar
- Bakhsh: Polan
- Rural District: Polan

Population (2006)
  - Total: 298
- Time zone: UTC+3:30 (IRST)
  - Summer (DST): UTC+4:30 (IRDT)

Morad Bazar (Persian: مرادبازار, also Romanized as Morād Bāzār) is a village in Polan Rural District, Polan District, Chabahar County, Sistan and Baluchestan Province, Iran. At the 2006 census, its population was 298, in 63 families.
