= Gholammohammad Bazar =

Gholammohammad Bazar غلام محمدبازار
- Village
- Location within Iran
- Coordinates: 25°34′24″N 61°09′20″E
- Country: Iran
- Province: Sistan and Baluchestan
- County: Chabahar
- Bakhsh: Polan
- Rural District: Polan

Population (2006)
  - Total: 452
- Time zone: UTC+3:30 (IRST)
  - Summer (DST): UTC+4:30 (IRDT)

Gholammohammad Bazar (Persian: غلام محمدبازار, also Romanized as Ghloāmmoḩammad Bāzār) is a village in Polan Rural District, Polan District, Chabahar County, Sistan and Baluchestan Province, Iran. At the 2006 census, its population was 452, in 73 families.
