= Bajar Bazar =

Village in Sistan and Baluchestan province, Iran

Bajar Bazar Persian: بجاربازار
- Village
- Location within Iran
- Coordinates: 25°38′49″N 60°58′41″E
- Country: Iran
- Province: Sistan and Baluchestan
- County: Chabahar
- District: Pir Sohrab
- Rural District: Bajar Bazar

Population (2016)
  - Total: 646
- Time zone: UTC+3:30 (IRST)

Bajar Bazar (Persian: بجاربازار) (Note: Also romanized as Bajār Bāzār; also known as Korkoch ‘Os̄mān Bāzār and ‘Os̄mān Bāzār) is a village in, and the capital of, Bajar Bazar Rural District of Pir Sohrab District, Chabahar County, (Note: Formerly Chah Bahar County) Sistan and Baluchestan province, Iran.

== Demographics ==
=== Population ===
At the time of the 2006 National Census, the village's population was 681 in 133 households, when it was in Pir Sohrab Rural District of the Central District. The following census in 2011 counted 700 people in 152 households. The 2016 census measured the population of the village as 646 people in 148 households.

After the census, the rural district was separated from the district in the establishment of Pir Sohrab District. Bajar Bazar was transferred to Bajar Bazar Rural District created in the new district.
