= Laghar Zehi =

Laghar Zehi لاغرزهي
- Village
- Location within Iran
- Coordinates: 25°37′17″N 61°01′15″E
- Country: Iran
- Province: Sistan and Baluchestan
- County: Chabahar
- Bakhsh: Polan
- Rural District: Polan

Population (2006)
  - Total: 280
- Time zone: UTC+3:30 (IRST)
  - Summer (DST): UTC+4:30 (IRDT)

Laghar Zehi (Persian: لاغرزهي, also Romanized as Lāghar Zehī) is a village in Polan Rural District, Polan District, Chabahar County, Sistan and Baluchestan Province, Iran. At the 2006 census, its population was 280, in 43 families.
