= Tiskupan =

Tiskupan طيس كوپان
- Village
- Location within Iran
- Coordinates: 25°19′21″N 60°45′21″E
- Country: Iran
- Province: Sistan and Baluchestan
- County: Chabahar
- Bakhsh: Central
- Rural District: Kambel-e Soleyman

Population (2006)
  - Total: 529
- Time zone: UTC+3:30 (IRST)
  - Summer (DST): UTC+4:30 (IRDT)

Tiskupan (Persian: طيس كوپان, also Romanized as Ţīskūpān; also known as Tiazkupān, Tīkūkhān, and Tīskūfān) is a village in Kambel-e Soleyman Rural District, in the Central District of Chabahar County, Sistan and Baluchestan Province, Iran. At the 2006 census, its population was 529, in 101 families.
