= Morid Bazar =

Morid Bazar مريد بازار
- Village
- Location within Iran
- Coordinates: 25°38′55″N 60°59′02″E
- Country: Iran
- Province: Sistan and Baluchestan
- County: Chabahar
- Bakhsh: Central
- Rural District: Pir Sohrab

Population (2006)
  - Total: 244
- Time zone: UTC+3:30 (IRST)
  - Summer (DST): UTC+4:30 (IRDT)

Morid Bazar (Persian: مريد بازار, also Romanized as Morīd Bāzār) is a village in Pir Sohrab Rural District, in the Central District of Chabahar County, Sistan and Baluchestan Province, Iran. At the 2006 census, its population was 244, in 45 families.
