= Harun Bazar =

Harun Bazar هارون بازار
- Village
- Location within Iran
- Coordinates: 25°34′44″N 61°05′42″E
- Country: Iran
- Province: Sistan and Baluchestan
- County: Chabahar
- Bakhsh: Polan
- Rural District: Polan

Population (2006)
  - Total: 35
- Time zone: UTC+3:30 (IRST)
  - Summer (DST): UTC+4:30 (IRDT)

Harun Bazar (Persian: هارون بازار, also Romanized as Hārūn Bāzār; also known as Hārūbāzār) is a village in Polan Rural District, Polan District, Chabahar County, Sistan and Baluchestan Province, Iran. At the 2006 census, its population was 35, in 6 families.
