= Allah Now Bazar =

Allah Now Bazar الله نوبازار
- Village
- Location within Iran
- Coordinates: 25°36′00″N 61°07′00″E
- Country: Iran
- Province: Sistan and Baluchestan
- County: Chabahar
- Bakhsh: Polan
- Rural District: Polan

Population (2006)
  - Total: 52
- Time zone: UTC+3:30 (IRST)
  - Summer (DST): UTC+4:30 (IRDT)

Allah Now Bazar (Persian: الله نوبازار, also Romanized as Allah Now Bāzār; also known as ‘Alā Nūr Bāzār) is a village in Polan Rural District, Polan District, Chabahar County, Sistan and Baluchestan Province, Iran. At the 2006 census, its population was 52, in 10 families.
