= Lati Dan =

Lati Dan لاتيدان
- Village
- Location within Iran
- Coordinates: 25°34′37″N 60°56′11″E
- Country: Iran
- Province: Sistan and Baluchestan
- County: Chabahar
- Bakhsh: Central
- Rural District: Pir Sohrab

Population (2006)
  - Total: 283
- Time zone: UTC+3:30 (IRST)
  - Summer (DST): UTC+4:30 (IRDT)

Lati Dan (Persian: لاتيدان, also Romanized as Lātī Dān) is a village in Pir Sohrab Rural District, in the Central District of Chabahar County, Sistan and Baluchestan Province, Iran. At the 2006 census, its population was 283, in 52 families.
