= Jamaat Zehi =

Jamaat Zehi جماعت زهي
- Village
- Location within Iran
- Coordinates: 25°37′34″N 61°09′23″E
- Country: Iran
- Province: Sistan and Baluchestan
- County: Chabahar
- Bakhsh: Polan
- Rural District: Polan

Population (2006)
  - Total: 394
- Time zone: UTC+3:30 (IRST)
  - Summer (DST): UTC+4:30 (IRDT)

Jamaat Zehi (Persian: جماعت زهي, also Romanized as Jamā‘at Zehī; also known as Jamā‘at Zā’ī, Jamā Zehī, Jammāzī, and Jommāzī) is a village in Polan Rural District, Polan District, Chabahar County, Sistan and Baluchestan Province, Iran. At the 2006 census, its population was 394, in 64 families.
