= Yaqub Zehi =

Yaqub Zehi يعقوب زهي
- Village
- Location within Iran
- Coordinates: 25°35′38″N 61°07′27″E
- Country: Iran
- Province: Sistan and Baluchestan
- County: Chabahar
- Bakhsh: Polan
- Rural District: Polan

Population (2006)
  - Total: 470
- Time zone: UTC+3:30 (IRST)
  - Summer (DST): UTC+4:30 (IRDT)

Yaqub Zehi (Persian: يعقوب زهي, also Romanized as Ya‘qūb Zehī) is a village in Polan Rural District, Polan District, Chabahar County, Sistan and Baluchestan Province, Iran. At the 2006 census, its population was 470, in 82 families.
