= Kamu Bazar =

Kamu Bazar كموبازار
- Village
- Location within Iran
- Coordinates: 25°34′48″N 61°05′30″E
- Country: Iran
- Province: Sistan and Baluchestan
- County: Chabahar
- Bakhsh: Polan
- Rural District: Polan

Population (2006)
  - Total: 244
- Time zone: UTC+3:30 (IRST)
  - Summer (DST): UTC+4:30 (IRDT)

Kamu Bazar (Persian: كموبازار, also Romanized as Kāmū Bāzār) is a village in Polan Rural District, Polan District, Chabahar County, Sistan and Baluchestan Province, Iran. At the 2006 census, its population was 244, in 41 families.
