= Kallah Sakan, Chabahar =

Kallah Sakan كله سكان
- Village
- Location within Iran
- Coordinates: 25°45′47″N 60°51′34″E
- Country: Iran
- Province: Sistan and Baluchestan
- County: Chabahar
- Bakhsh: Central
- Rural District: Pir Sohrab

Population (2006)
  - Total: 615
- Time zone: UTC+3:30 (IRST)
  - Summer (DST): UTC+4:30 (IRDT)

Kallah Sakan (Persian: كله سكان, also Romanized as Kallah Sakān, Kalleh Sakan, and Kalleh Sakān; also known as Kalīsagān, Kalsakān, and Kelīsgān) is a village in Pir Sohrab Rural District, in the Central District of Chabahar County, Sistan and Baluchestan Province, Iran. At the 2006 census, its population was 615, in 108 families.
