= Pir Sohrab =

Village in Sistan and Baluchestan province, Iran

Pir Sohrab Persian: پيرسهراب
- Village
- Location within Iran
- Coordinates: 25°44′02″N 60°52′35″E
- Country: Iran
- Province: Sistan and Baluchestan
- County: Chabahar
- District: Pir Sohrab
- Rural District: Pir Sohrab

Population (2016)
  - Total: 1,081
- Time zone: UTC+3:30 (IRST)

Pir Sohrab (Persian: پيرسهراب) (Note: Also romanized as Pīr Sohrāb; also known as Pīr Sorād and Pīr Sūrab)) is a village in, and the former capital of, Pir Sohrab Rural District of Pir Sohrab District, Chabahar County, (Note: Formerly Chah Bahar County) Sistan and Baluchestan province, Iran, serving as capital of the district. The capital of the rural district has been transferred to the village of Owraki Bozorg-e Olya.

== Demographics ==
=== Population ===
At the time of the 2006 National Census, the village's population was 675 in 110 households, when it was in the Central District. The following census in 2011 counted 873 people in 197 households. The 2016 census measured the population of the village as 1,081 people in 259 households.

After the census, the rural district was separated from the district in the establishment of Pir Sohrab District.
