= Chutani =

Chutani چوتاني
- Village
- Location within Iran
- Coordinates: 25°38′57″N 60°58′03″E
- Country: Iran
- Province: Sistan and Baluchestan
- County: Chabahar
- Bakhsh: Central
- Rural District: Pir Sohrab

Population (2006)
  - Total: 330
- Time zone: UTC+3:30 (IRST)
  - Summer (DST): UTC+4:30 (IRDT)

Chutani (Persian: چوتاني, also Romanized as Chūtānī; also known as Sheykh Bāzār) is a village in Pir Sohrab Rural District, in the Central District of Chabahar County, Sistan and Baluchestan Province, Iran. As of the 2006 census, its population was 330 with 69 families.
