= Gurankesh-e Molla Goharam =

Gurankesh-e Molla Goharam گورانكش ملاگهرام
- Village
- Location within Iran
- Coordinates: 25°18′31″N 60°53′45″E
- Country: Iran
- Province: Sistan and Baluchestan
- County: Chabahar
- Bakhsh: Central
- Rural District: Kambel-e Soleyman

Population (2006)
  - Total: 74
- Time zone: UTC+3:30 (IRST)
  - Summer (DST): UTC+4:30 (IRDT)

Gurankesh-e Molla Goharam (Persian: گورانكش ملاگهرام, also Romanized as Gūrānkesh-e Mollā Goharām and Gūrānkosh-e Mollā Gahrām; also known as Gorān Kash, Gowrān Kash-e Bālā, Gūrānkesh-e Bālā, Gūrān Kesh-e Bālā, Gūrānkesh-e Mollā Goharān, Gūrānkosh, Gūrān Kosh-e Bālā, Kūrānkoch-e Bālā, and Kūrānkosh) is a village in Kambel-e Soleyman Rural District, in the Central District of Chabahar County, Sistan and Baluchestan Province, Iran. At the 2006 census, its population was 74, in 20 families.
