= Kuh Dim-e Bala =

Kuh Dim-e Bala كوه ديم بالا
- Village
- Location within Iran
- Coordinates: 25°34′00″N 61°02′00″E
- Country: Iran
- Province: Sistan and Baluchestan
- County: Chabahar
- Bakhsh: Polan
- Rural District: Polan

Population (2006)
  - Total: 341
- Time zone: UTC+3:30 (IRST)
  - Summer (DST): UTC+4:30 (IRDT)

Kuh Dim-e Bala (Persian: كوه ديم بالا, also Romanized as Kūh Dīm-e Bālā) is a village in Polan Rural District, Polan District, Chabahar County, Sistan and Baluchestan Province, Iran. At the 2006 census, its population was 341, in 66 families.
