= Jomabazar =

Jomabazar (Persian: جمابازار) may refer to:

- Jomabazar, Chabahar
- Jomabazar, Polan, Chabahar County
