= Sandakzehi =

Sandakzehi (Persian: ساندكزهي) may refer to:

- Sandakzehi-ye Bala
- Sandakzehi-ye Pain
