= Vashnam-e Faqir Mohammad =

Vashnam-e Faqir Mohammad وشنام فقيرمحمد
- Village
- Location within Iran
- Coordinates: 25°24′33″N 60°50′11″E
- Country: Iran
- Province: Sistan and Baluchestan
- County: Chabahar
- Bakhsh: Central
- Rural District: Kambel-e Soleyman

Population (2006)
  - Total: 131
- Time zone: UTC+3:30 (IRST)
  - Summer (DST): UTC+4:30 (IRDT)

Vashnam-e Faqir Mohammad (Persian: وشنام فقيرمحمد, also Romanized as Vashnām-e Faqīr Moḩammad) is a village in Kambel-e Soleyman Rural District, in the Central District of Chabahar County, Sistan and Baluchestan Province, Iran. At the 2006 census, its population was 131, in 33 families.
