= Vashnam-e Dust Mohammad =

Vashnam-e Dust Mohammad وشنام دوست محمد
- Village
- Location within Iran
- Coordinates: 25°23′23″N 60°48′33″E
- Country: Iran
- Province: Sistan and Baluchestan
- County: Chabahar
- Bakhsh: Central
- Rural District: Kambel-e Soleyman

Population (2006)
  - Total: 52
- Time zone: UTC+3:30 (IRST)
  - Summer (DST): UTC+4:30 (IRDT)

Vashnam-e Dust Mohammad (Persian: وشنام دوست محمد, also Romanized as Vashnām-e Dūst Moḩammad and Veshnām-e Dūst Moḩammad; also known as Rezhnān, Vājnān, Vashnām, Vāzhnān, and Wajnān) is a village in Kambel-e Soleyman Rural District, in the Central District of Chabahar County, Sistan and Baluchestan Province, Iran. At the 2006 census, its population was 52, in 12 families.
