= Gowmazi Kowsar =

Gowmazi Kowsar گو مازي کوثر
- Village
- Location within Iran
- Coordinates: 25°27′30″N 60°50′18″E
- Country: Iran
- Province: Sistan and Baluchestan
- County: Chabahar
- Bakhsh: Central
- Rural District: Kambel-e Soleyman

Population (2006)
  - Total: 47
- Time zone: UTC+3:30 (IRST)
  - Summer (DST): UTC+4:30 (IRDT)

Gowmazi Kowsar (Persian: گو مازي کوثر, also Romanized as Gowmāzī Kows̄ar) is a village in Kambel-e Soleyman Rural District, in the Central District of Chabahar County, Sistan and Baluchestan Province, Iran. At the 2006 census, its population was 47, in 7 families.
