= Gazani =

Gazani or Gozani (Persian: گزاني) may refer to:

- Gazani-ye Pain
- Gazani-ye Taj Mohammad
