= Nadekan-e Shahdad =

Nadekan-e Shahdad ندکان شهداد
- Village
- Location within Iran
- Coordinates: 25°37′00″N 60°48′00″E
- Country: Iran
- Province: Sistan and Baluchestan
- County: Chabahar
- Bakhsh: Central
- Rural District: Pir Sohrab

Population (2006)
  - Total: 68
- Time zone: UTC+3:30 (IRST)
  - Summer (DST): UTC+4:30 (IRDT)

Nadekan-e Shahdad (Persian: ندکان شهداد, also Romanize as Nadekān-e Shahdād) is a village in Pir Sohrab Rural District, in the Central District of Chabahar County, Sistan and Baluchestan Province, Iran. At the 2006 census, its population was 68, in 16 families.
