= Dambdaf =

Dambdaf دمبدف
- Village
- Location within Iran
- Coordinates: 25°27′44″N 60°56′51″E
- Country: Iran
- Province: Sistan and Baluchestan
- County: Chabahar
- Bakhsh: Central
- Rural District: Kambel-e Soleyman

Population (2006)
  - Total: 571
- Time zone: UTC+3:30 (IRST)
  - Summer (DST): UTC+4:30 (IRDT)

Dambdaf (Persian: دمبدف; also known as Dambdaf-e Shafīʿ Moḩammad, Dambadāb, Dambdāb, Dambdab, Dambodāb, and Dambodad) is a village in Kambel-e Soleyman Rural District, in the Central District of Chabahar County, Sistan and Baluchestan Province, Iran. At the 2006 census, its population was 571, in 97 families.
