= Vashnam-e Dari =

Village in Sistan and Baluchestan province, Iran

Vashnam-e Dari Persian: وشنام دري
- Village
- Location within Iran
- Coordinates: 25°24′35″N 60°46′52″E
- Country: Iran
- Province: Sistan and Baluchestan
- County: Chabahar
- District: Central
- Rural District: Vashnam-e Dari

Population (2016)
  - Total: 665
- Time zone: UTC+3:30 (IRST)

Vashnam-e Dari (Persian: وشنام دري) (Note: Also romanized as Vashnām-e Darī; also known as Vashnām) is a village in, and the capital of, Vashnam-e Dari Rural District of the Central District of Chabahar County, (Note: Formerly Chah Bahar County) Sistan and Baluchestan province, Iran.

== Demographics ==
=== Population ===
At the time of the 2006 National Census, the village's population was 399 in 85 households, when it was in Kambel-e Soleyman Rural District. The following census in 2011 counted 618 people in 122 households. The 2016 census measured the population of the village as 665 people in 153 households.

After the census, Vashnam-e Dari was transferred to Vashnam-e Dari Rural District created in the Central District.
