= Kambel Karim Bakhsh =

Kambel Karim Bakhsh كمبل كريم بخش
- Village
- Location within Iran
- Coordinates: 25°36′53″N 61°01′06″E
- Country: Iran
- Province: Sistan and Baluchestan
- County: Chabahar
- Bakhsh: Central
- Rural District: Kambel-e Soleyman

Population (2006)
  - Total: 537
- Time zone: UTC+3:30 (IRST)
  - Summer (DST): UTC+4:30 (IRDT)

Kambel Karim Bakhsh (Persian: كمبل كريم بخش, also Romanized as Kambel Karīm Bakhsh; also known as Karīm Bakhsh Bāzār) is a village in Kambel-e Soleyman Rural District, in the Central District of Chabahar County, Sistan and Baluchestan Province, Iran. At the 2006 census, its population was 537, in 94 families.
