= Chukat-e Bala =

Chukat-e Bala چوكات بالا
- Village
- Location within Iran
- Coordinates: 25°36′29″N 61°03′22″E
- Country: Iran
- Province: Sistan and Baluchestan
- County: Chabahar
- Bakhsh: Polan
- Rural District: Polan

Population (2006)
  - Total: 273
- Time zone: UTC+3:30 (IRST)
  - Summer (DST): UTC+4:30 (IRDT)

Chukat-e Bala (Persian: چوكات بالا, also romanized as Chūkāt-e Bālā; also known as Chaukāt, Chokat, Chūgāt, Chukāt, and Chūkāt Dard) is a village in Polan Rural District, Polan District, Chabahar County, Sistan and Baluchestan Province, Iran. At the 2006 census, its population was 273, in 54 families.
