= Jangarek =

Jangarek or Jangark (Persian: جنگارك) may refer to:

- Jangarek-e Bala
- Jangarek-e Pain
