= Gar Kandi, Sistan and Baluchestan =

Gar Kandi گار کندي
- Village
- Location within Iran
- Coordinates: 25°37′04″N 61°03′40″E
- Country: Iran
- Province: Sistan and Baluchestan
- County: Chabahar
- Bakhsh: Polan
- Rural District: Polan

Population (2006)
  - Total: 311
- Time zone: UTC+3:30 (IRST)
  - Summer (DST): UTC+4:30 (IRDT)

Gar Kandi (Persian: گار کندي, also Romanized as Gār Kandī and Gar Kandī; also known as Kār Gandī) is a village in Polan Rural District, Polan District, Chabahar County, Sistan and Baluchestan Province, Iran. At the 2006 census, its population was 311, in 69 families.
