= Jangarek-e Pain =

Jangarek-e Pain جنگارك پائين
- Village
- Location within Iran
- Coordinates: 25°39′25″N 60°59′40″E
- Country: Iran
- Province: Sistan and Baluchestan
- County: Chabahar
- Bakhsh: Central
- Rural District: Pir Sohrab

Population (2006)
  - Total: 139
- Time zone: UTC+3:30 (IRST)
  - Summer (DST): UTC+4:30 (IRDT)

Jangarek-e Pain (Persian: جنگارك پائين, also Romanized as Jangārek-e Pā’īn; also known as Jangārk) is a village in Pir Sohrab Rural District, in the Central District of Chabahar County, Sistan and Baluchestan Province, Iran. At the 2006 census, its population was 139, in 26 families.
