= Faqir Zehi Nur Mohammad =

Faqir Zehi Nur Mohammad فقيرزهي نورمحمد
- Village
- Country: Iran
- Province: Sistan and Baluchestan
- County: Chabahar
- Bakhsh: Polan
- Rural District: Polan

Population (2006)
  - Total: 349
- Time zone: UTC+3:30 (IRST)
  - Summer (DST): UTC+4:30 (IRDT)

Faqir Zehi Nur Mohammad (Persian: فقيرزهي نورمحمد, also Romanized as Faqīr Zehī Nūr Moḩammad) is a village in Polan Rural District, Polan District, Chabahar County, Sistan and Baluchestan Province, Iran. At the 2006 census, its population was 349, in 52 families.
