= Jadu Zehi =

Jadu Zehi (Persian: جادو زهي), also rendered as Jaddeh Zai or Jaddeh Zehi or Jado Zi or Jad Zai or Jadzi, may refer to:

- Jadu Zehi Buhir
- Jadu Zehi Hajji Piri
