= Nadekan-e Shafi Mohammad =

Nadekan-e Shafi Mohammad ندکان شفيع محمد
- Village
- Location within Iran
- Coordinates: 25°37′00″N 60°49′00″E
- Country: Iran
- Province: Sistan and Baluchestan
- County: Chabahar
- Bakhsh: Central
- Rural District: Pir Sohrab

Population (2006)
  - Total: 53
- Time zone: UTC+3:30 (IRST)
  - Summer (DST): UTC+4:30 (IRDT)

Nadekan-e Shafi Mohammad (Persian: ندکان شفيع محمد, also Romanized as Nadekān-e Shafī‘ Moḩammad) is a village in Pir Sohrab Rural District, in the Central District of Chabahar County, Sistan and Baluchestan Province, Iran. At the 2006 census, its population was 53, in 11 families.
