= Jadu Zehi Hajji Piri =

Jadu Zehi Hajji Piri جادو زهي حاجي پيري
- Village
- Location within Iran
- Coordinates: 25°35′04″N 61°12′44″E
- Country: Iran
- Province: Sistan and Baluchestan
- County: Chabahar
- Bakhsh: Polan
- Rural District: Polan

Population (2006)
  - Total: 375
- Time zone: UTC+3:30 (IRST)
  - Summer (DST): UTC+4:30 (IRDT)

Jadu Zehi Hajji Piri (Persian: جادو زهي حاجي پيري, also Romanized as Jādū Zehī Ḩājjī Pīrī; also known as Jāddeh Zā’ī, Jāddeh Zehī, Jado Zī, Jādū Zehī, Jad Zā’ī, and Jadzī) is a village in Polan Rural District, Polan District, Chabahar County, Sistan and Baluchestan Province, Iran. At the 2006 census, its population was 375, in 75 families.
