= Faqir Zehi Khan Mohammad Bazar =

Faqir Zehi Khan Mohammad Bazar فقيرزهي خان محمدبازار
- Village
- Country: Iran
- Province: Sistan and Baluchestan
- County: Chabahar
- Bakhsh: Polan
- Rural District: Polan

Population (2006)
  - Total: 82
- Time zone: UTC+3:30 (IRST)
  - Summer (DST): UTC+4:30 (IRDT)

Faqir Zehi Khan Mohammad Bazar (Persian: فقيرزهي خان محمدبازار, also Romanized as Faqīr Zehī Khān Moḩammad Bāzār) is a village in Polan Rural District, Polan District, Chabahar County, Sistan and Baluchestan Province, Iran. At the 2006 census, its population was 82, in 12 families.
