= Chukat-e Abdol Karim Bazar =

Chukat-e Abdol Karim Bazar چوكات عبدالكريم بازار
- Village
- Country: Iran
- Province: Sistan and Baluchestan
- County: Chabahar
- Bakhsh: Polan
- Rural District: Polan

Population (2006)
  - Total: 132
- Time zone: UTC+3:30 (IRST)
  - Summer (DST): UTC+4:30 (IRDT)

Chukat-e Abdol Karim Bazar (Persian: چوكات عبدالكريم بازار, also Romanized as Chūkāt-e ʿAbdol Karīm Bāzār) is a village in Polan Rural District, Polan District, Chabahar County, Sistan and Baluchestan Province, Iran. At the 2006 census, its population was 132, in 30 families.
