= Pirouz Got Castle =

Castle in Sistan and Baluchestan Province, Iran

- قلعه پیروز گت

General information
- Type: Castle
- Location: Tis, Iran, Iran

Pirouz Got Castle (Persian: قلعه پیروز گت) is a historical castle located in Chabahar County in Sistan and Baluchestan Province, The longevity of this fortress dates back to the Parthian Empire and Sasanian Empire.

The stones used in the buildings are non-limestone, which were brought here from other places because the material of the hill itself is limestone and silica. According to the remaining works, this building is similar to the buildings of the Parthian period, and the name of Pirouz Sassanid increases this possibility.
