= Moridarow-e Bala =

Moridarow-e Bala مريداروبالا
- Village
- Location within Iran
- Coordinates: 25°39′47″N 61°03′43″E
- Country: Iran
- Province: Sistan and Baluchestan
- County: Chabahar
- Bakhsh: Polan
- Rural District: Polan

Population (2006)
  - Total: 137
- Time zone: UTC+3:30 (IRST)
  - Summer (DST): UTC+4:30 (IRDT)

Moridarow-e Bala (Persian: مريداروبالا, also Romanized as Morīdārow-e Bālā; also known as Morīdārow-e ‘Olyā) is a village in Polan Rural District, Polan District, Chabahar County, Sistan and Baluchestan Province, Iran. At the 2006 census, its population was 137, in 20 families.
