= Dambdaf-e Moradi =

Dambdaf-e Moradi دمبدف مرادي
- Village
- Country: Iran
- Province: Sistan and Baluchestan
- County: Chabahar
- Bakhsh: Central
- Rural District: Kambel-e Soleyman

Population (2006)
  - Total: 242
- Time zone: UTC+3:30 (IRST)
  - Summer (DST): UTC+4:30 (IRDT)

Dambdaf-e Moradi (Persian: دمبدف مرادي, also Romanized as Dambdaf-e Morādī) is a village in Kambel-e Soleyman Rural District, in the Central District of Chabahar County, Sistan and Baluchestan Province, Iran. At the 2006 census, its population was 242, in 38 families.
