= Hoseyn Bazar, Chabahar =

Hoseyn Bazar حسين بازار
- Village
- Interactive map of Hoseyn Bazar
- Country: Iran
- Province: Sistan and Baluchestan
- County: Chabahar
- Bakhsh: Polan
- Rural District: Polan

Population (2006)
  - Total: 153
- Time zone: UTC+3:30 (IRST)
  - Summer (DST): UTC+4:30 (IRDT)

Hoseyn Bazar (Persian: حسين بازار, also Romanized as Ḩoseyn Bāzār) is a village in Polan Rural District, Polan District, Chabahar County, Sistan and Baluchestan Province, Iran. At the 2006 census, its population was 153, in 26 families.
