= Gowmazi Sanjar =

Gowmazi Sanjar گومازی سنجر
- Village
- Location within Iran
- Coordinates: 25°27′10″N 60°51′36″E
- Country: Iran
- Province: Sistan and Baluchestan
- County: Chabahar
- Bakhsh: Central
- Rural District: Kambel-e Soleyman

Population (2006)
  - Total: 149
- Time zone: UTC+3:30 (IRST)
  - Summer (DST): UTC+4:30 (IRDT)

Gowmazi Sanjar (Persian: گومازی سنجر, also Romanized as Gowmāzī Sanjar; also known as Gowmāzī) is a village in Kambel-e Soleyman Rural District, in the Central District of Chabahar County, Sistan and Baluchestan Province, Iran. At the 2006 census, its population was 149, in 22 families.
