= Ali Mohammad Bazar =

Ali Mohammad Bazar علي محمدبازار
- Village
- Location within Iran
- Coordinates: 25°44′44″N 60°57′52″E
- Country: Iran
- Province: Sistan and Baluchestan
- County: Chabahar
- Bakhsh: Central
- Rural District: Pir Sohrab

Population (2006)
  - Total: 118
- Time zone: UTC+3:30 (IRST)
  - Summer (DST): UTC+4:30 (IRDT)

Ali Mohammad Bazar (Persian: علي محمدبازار, also Romanized as ʿAlī Moḩammad Bāzār; also known as Moḩammad Bāzār) is a village in Pir Sohrab Rural District, in the Central District of Chabahar County, Sistan and Baluchestan Province, Iran. At the 2006 census, its population was 118, in 20 families.
