= Dadrahman =

Dadrahman (Persian: دادرحمان) may refer to:

- Dadrahman Badfar
- Dadrahman Bazar (disambiguation)
