= Vashnam-e Mirgol =

Vashnam-e Mirgol وشنام ميرگل
- Village
- Location within Iran
- Coordinates: 25°24′37″N 60°46′54″E
- Country: Iran
- Province: Sistan and Baluchestan
- County: Chabahar
- Bakhsh: Central
- Rural District: Kambel-e Soleyman

Population (2006)
  - Total: 176
- Time zone: UTC+3:30 (IRST)
  - Summer (DST): UTC+4:30 (IRDT)

Vashnam-e Mirgol (Persian: وشنام ميرگل, also Romanized as Vashnām-e Mīrgol; also known as Vashnām-e Pā’īn, Veshnām, and Voshnām) is a village in Kambel-e Soleyman Rural District, in the Central District of Chabahar County, Sistan and Baluchestan Province, Iran. At the 2006 census, its population was 176, in 34 families.
