= Chukat-e Vasat =

Chukat-e Vasat چوکات وسط
- Village
- Location within Iran
- Coordinates: 25°37′14″N 61°02′21″E
- Country: Iran
- Province: Sistan and Baluchestan
- County: Chabahar
- Bakhsh: Polan
- Rural District: Polan

Population (2006)
  - Total: 311
- Time zone: UTC+3:30 (IRST)
  - Summer (DST): UTC+4:30 (IRDT)

Chukat-e Vasat (Persian: چوکات وسط, also Romanized as Chūkāt-e Vasaţ) is a village in Polan Rural District, Polan District, Chabahar County, Sistan and Baluchestan Province, Iran. At the 2006 census, its population was 311, in 64 families.
