= Morad Mohammad Bazar, Chabahar =

Morad Mohammad Bazar مراد محمد بازار
- Village
- Location within Iran
- Coordinates: 25°43′36″N 60°56′50″E
- Country: Iran
- Province: Sistan and Baluchestan
- County: Chabahar
- Bakhsh: Central
- Rural District: Pir Sohrab

Population (2006)
  - Total: 351
- Time zone: UTC+3:30 (IRST)
  - Summer (DST): UTC+4:30 (IRDT)

Morad Mohammad Bazar (Persian: مراد محمد بازار, also Romanized as Morād Moḩammad Bāzār; also known as Seh Rāhī Talang) is a village in Pir Sohrab Rural District, in the Central District of Chabahar County, Sistan and Baluchestan Province, Iran. At the 2006 census, its population was 351, in 84 families.
