= Moridarow =

Moridarow (Persian: مريدارو), also rendered as Muridarow, may refer to:

- Moridarow-e Bala
- Moridarow-e Pain
