= Hoseyn Bazar =

Hoseyn Bazar (Persian: حسين بازار) may refer to:

- Hoseyn Bazar, Chabahar
- Hoseyn Bazar (25°35′ N 61°06′ E), Chabahar
