= Dadrahman Bazar, Polan =

Dadrahman Bazar داد رحمان بازار
- Village
- Country: Iran
- Province: Sistan and Baluchestan
- County: Chabahar
- Bakhsh: Polan
- Rural District: Polan

Population (2006)
  - Total: 192
- Time zone: UTC+3:30 (IRST)
  - Summer (DST): UTC+4:30 (IRDT)

Dadrahman Bazar (Persian: داد رحمان بازار, also Romanized as Dādraḩmān Bāzār; also known as Kalmatī) is a village in Polan Rural District, Polan District, Chabahar County, Sistan and Baluchestan Province, Iran. At the 2006 census, its population was 192, in 47 families.
