= Gazani-ye Pain =

Gazani-ye Pain گزاني پائين
- Village
- Location within Iran
- Coordinates: 25°36′21″N 61°03′51″E
- Country: Iran
- Province: Sistan and Baluchestan
- County: Chabahar
- Bakhsh: Polan
- Rural District: Polan

Population (2006)
  - Total: 223
- Time zone: UTC+3:30 (IRST)
  - Summer (DST): UTC+4:30 (IRDT)

Gazani-ye Pain (Persian: گزاني پائين, also Romanized as Gazānī-ye Pā’īn; also known as Gazānī-ye Mīrān) is a village in Polan Rural District, Polan District, Chabahar County, Sistan and Baluchestan Province, Iran. At the 2006 census, its population was 223, in 35 families.
