= Gar Kandi Rasul Bakhsh Bazar =

Gar Kandi Rasul Bakhsh Bazar گارکندي رسول بخش بازار
- Village
- Location within Iran
- Coordinates: 25°36′46″N 61°03′24″E
- Country: Iran
- Province: Sistan and Baluchestan
- County: Chabahar
- Bakhsh: Polan
- Rural District: Polan

Population (2006)
  - Total: 418
- Time zone: UTC+3:30 (IRST)
  - Summer (DST): UTC+4:30 (IRDT)

Gar Kandi Rasul Bakhsh Bazar (Persian: گارکندي رسول بخش بازار, also Romanized as Gār Kandī Rasūl Bakhsh Bāzār; also known as Gar Kandī) is a village in Polan Rural District, Polan District, Chabahar County, Sistan and Baluchestan Province, Iran. At the 2006 census, its population was 418, in 78 families.
