= Sandakzehi-ye Bala =

Sandakzehi-ye Bala ساندكزهي بالا
- Village
- Location within Iran
- Coordinates: 25°33′51″N 61°11′47″E
- Country: Iran
- Province: Sistan and Baluchestan
- County: Chabahar
- Bakhsh: Polan
- Rural District: Polan

Population (2006)
  - Total: 567
- Time zone: UTC+3:30 (IRST)
  - Summer (DST): UTC+4:30 (IRDT)

Sandakzehi-ye Bala (Persian: ساندكزهي بالا, also Romanized as Sāndakzehī-ye Bālā) is a village in Polan Rural District, Polan District, Chabahar County, Sistan and Baluchestan Province, Iran. At the 2006 census, its population was 567, in 92 families.
