= Kuh Dim =

Kuh Dim (Persian: كوه ديم), also rendered as Kuh Dem, may refer to:

- Kuh Dim-e Bala
- Kuh Dim-e Pain
