= Bajar Bazar Rural District =

Rural district in Sistan and Baluchestan province, Iran

Bajar Bazar Rural District Persian: دهستان بجاربازار
- Rural District
- Location within Iran
- Coordinates: 25°38′18″N 60°58′30″E
- Country: Iran
- Province: Sistan and Baluchestan
- County: Chabahar
- District: Pir Sohrab
- Capital: Bajar Bazar
- Time zone: UTC+3:30 (IRST)

Bajar Bazar Rural District (Persian: دهستان بجاربازار) is in Pir Sohrab District of Chabahar County, (Note: Formerly Chah Bahar County) Sistan and Baluchestan province, Iran. Its capital is the village of Bajar Bazar, whose population at the time of the 2016 National Census was 646 people.

== History ==
After the 2016 census, Pir Sohrab Rural District was separated from the Central District in the establishment of Pir Sohrab District, and Bajar Bazar Rural District was created in the new district.
