= Vashnam-e Kheyr Mohammad =

Vashnam-e Kheyr Mohammad وشنام خير محمد
- Village
- Location within Iran
- Coordinates: 25°44′52″N 60°55′19″E
- Country: Iran
- Province: Sistan and Baluchestan
- County: Chabahar
- Bakhsh: Central
- Rural District: Kambel-e Soleyman

Population (2006)
  - Total: 96
- Time zone: UTC+3:30 (IRST)
  - Summer (DST): UTC+4:30 (IRDT)

Vashnam-e Kheyr Mohammad (Persian: وشنام خير محمد, also Romanized as Vashnām-e Kheyr Moḩammad; also known as Kheyrmoḩammad) is a village in Kambel-e Soleyman Rural District, in the Central District of Chabahar County, Sistan and Baluchestan Province, Iran. At the 2006 census, its population was 96, in 13 families.
