= Hoseyn Bazar (25°35′ N 61°06′ E), Chabahar =

Hoseyn Bazar حسين بازار
- Village
- Location within Iran
- Coordinates: 25°35′15″N 61°06′07″E
- Country: Iran
- Province: Sistan and Baluchestan
- County: Chabahar
- Bakhsh: Polan
- Rural District: Polan

Population (2006)
  - Total: 487
- Time zone: UTC+3:30 (IRST)
  - Summer (DST): UTC+4:30 (IRDT)

Hoseyn Bazar (Persian: حسين بازار, also Romanized as Ḩoseyn Bāzār) is a village in Polan Rural District, Polan District, Chabahar County, Sistan and Baluchestan Province, Iran. At the 2006 census, its population was 487, in 84 families.
