= Gurankesh-e Abd ol Rahman =

Gurankesh-e Abd ol Rahman گورانكش عبدالرحمن
- Village
- Location within Iran
- Coordinates: 25°17′02″N 60°52′56″E
- Country: Iran
- Province: Sistan and Baluchestan
- County: Chabahar
- Bakhsh: Central
- Rural District: Kambel-e Soleyman

Population (2006)
  - Total: 165
- Time zone: UTC+3:30 (IRST)
  - Summer (DST): UTC+4:30 (IRDT)

Gurankesh-e Abd ol Rahman (Persian: گورانكش عبدالرحمن, also Romanized as Gūrānkesh-e ‘Abd ol Raḩmān and Gūrānkosh-e ‘Abd or Raḩmān; also known as Gorān Kash, Gowrān Kash-e Pā’īn, Gūrānkesh-e Pā’īn, Gūrān Kesh-e Pā’īn, Gūrānkosh, Gūrān Kosh-e Pā’īn, Kūrān Kash, Kūrānkoch-e Pāīn, and Kūrānkosh) is a village in Kambel-e Soleyman Rural District, in the Central District of Chabahar County, Sistan and Baluchestan Province, Iran. At the 2006 census, its population was 165, in 33 families.
