= Moridarow-e Pain =

Moridarow-e Pain مريداروپايين
- Village
- Location within Iran
- Coordinates: 25°39′26″N 61°02′49″E
- Country: Iran
- Province: Sistan and Baluchestan
- County: Chabahar
- Bakhsh: Polan
- Rural District: Polan

Population (2006)
  - Total: 56
- Time zone: UTC+3:30 (IRST)
  - Summer (DST): UTC+4:30 (IRDT)

Moridarow-e Pain (Persian: مريداروپايين, also Romanized as Morīdārow-e Pā’īn; also known as Morīdārow-e Soflá) is a village in Polan Rural District, Polan District, Chabahar County, Sistan and Baluchestan Province, Iran. At the 2006 census, its population was 56, in 7 families.
