= Vashnam-e Eshaq =

Vashnam-e Eshaq وشنام اسحق
- Village
- Location within Iran
- Coordinates: 25°26′38″N 60°51′30″E
- Country: Iran
- Province: Sistan and Baluchestan
- County: Chabahar
- Bakhsh: Central
- Rural District: Kambel-e Soleyman

Population (2006)
  - Total: 48
- Time zone: UTC+3:30 (IRST)
  - Summer (DST): UTC+4:30 (IRDT)

Vashnam-e Eshaq (Persian: وشنام اسحق, also Romanized as Vashnām-e Esḩaq) is a village in Kambel-e Soleyman Rural District, in the Central District of Chabahar County, Sistan and Baluchestan Province, Iran. At the 2006 census, its population was 48, in 10 families.
