= Sheykh Bazar =

Sheykh Bazar (Persian: شيخ بازار) may refer to:

- Sheykh Bazar, Chabahar
- Sheykh Bazar, Polan, Chabahar County
