= Jadu Zehi Buhir =

Jadu Zehi Buhir جادوزهي بوهير
- Village
- Country: Iran
- Province: Sistan and Baluchestan
- County: Chabahar
- Bakhsh: Polan
- Rural District: Polan

Population (2006)
  - Total: 139
- Time zone: UTC+3:30 (IRST)
  - Summer (DST): UTC+4:30 (IRDT)

Jadu Zehi Buhir (Persian: جادوزهي بوهير, also Romanized as Jādū Zehī Būhīr) is a village in Polan Rural District, Polan District, Chabahar County, Sistan and Baluchestan Province, Iran. At the 2006 census, its population was 139, in 31 families.
