= Morad Mohammad Bazar =

Morad Mohammad Bazar (Persian: مرادمحمدبازار) may refer to:

- Morad Mohammad Bazar, Chabahar
- Morad Mohammad Bazar, Polan, Chabahar County
