= Nadekan-e Gurmi =

Nadekan-e Gurmi ندکان گورمي
- Village
- Location within Iran
- Coordinates: 25°37′39″N 60°50′53″E
- Country: Iran
- Province: Sistan and Baluchestan
- County: Chabahar
- Bakhsh: Central
- Rural District: Pir Sohrab

Population (2006)
  - Total: 262
- Time zone: UTC+3:30 (IRST)
  - Summer (DST): UTC+4:30 (IRDT)

Nadekan-e Gurmi (Persian: ندکان گورمي, also Romanized as Nadekān-e Gūrmī; also known as Nadeh Kān-e Gūrmī) is a village in Pir Sohrab Rural District, in the Central District of Chabahar County, Sistan and Baluchestan Province, Iran. At the 2006 census, its population was 262, in 45 families.
