= Sediq Zehi =

Village in Sistan and Baluchestan province, Iran

Sediq Zehi Persian: صديق زهي
- Village
- Location within Iran
- Coordinates: 25°35′36″N 61°08′08″E
- Country: Iran
- Province: Sistan and Baluchestan
- County: Chabahar
- District: Polan
- Rural District: Polan

Population (2016)
  - Total: 1,852
- Time zone: UTC+3:30 (IRST)

Sediq Zehi (Persian: صديق زهي) (Note: Also romanized as Şedīq Zehī; also known as Şaddīqzī and Şeddīq Zā’ī) is a village in Polan Rural District of Polan District, Chabahar County, (Note: Formerly Chah Bahar County) Sistan and Baluchestan province, Iran.

== Demographics ==
=== Population ===
At the time of the 2006 National Census, the village's population was 1,632 in 217 households. The following census in 2011 counted 1,727 people in 354 households. The 2016 census measured the population of the village as 1,852 people in 417 households. It was the most populous village in its rural district.
