= Dambdaf-e Osman =

Dambdaf-e Osman دمبدف عثمان
- Village
- Country: Iran
- Province: Sistan and Baluchestan
- County: Chabahar
- Bakhsh: Central
- Rural District: Kambel-e Soleyman

Population (2006)
  - Total: 250
- Time zone: UTC+3:30 (IRST)
  - Summer (DST): UTC+4:30 (IRDT)

Dambdaf-e Osman (Persian: دمبدف عثمان, also Romanized as Dambdaf-e ʿOs̄mān) is a village in Kambel-e Soleyman Rural District, in the Central District of Chabahar County, Sistan and Baluchestan Province, Iran. At the 2006 census, its population was 250, in 43 families.
