= Dambdaf-e Miran =

Dambdaf-e Miran دمبدف ميران
- Village
- Country: Iran
- Province: Sistan and Baluchestan
- County: Chabahar
- Bakhsh: Central
- Rural District: Kambel-e Soleyman

Population (2006)
  - Total: 106
- Time zone: UTC+3:30 (IRST)
  - Summer (DST): UTC+4:30 (IRDT)

Dambdaf-e Miran (Persian: دمبدف ميران, also Romanized as Dambdaf-e Mīrān) is a village in Kambel-e Soleyman Rural District, in the Central District of Chabahar County, Sistan and Baluchestan Province, Iran. At the 2006 census, its population was 106, in 16 families.
