= Gowmazi Osman =

Gowmazi Osman گومازي عثمان
- Village
- Country: Iran
- Province: Sistan and Baluchestan
- County: Chabahar
- Bakhsh: Central
- Rural District: Kambel-e Soleyman

Population (2006)
  - Total: 21
- Time zone: UTC+3:30 (IRST)
  - Summer (DST): UTC+4:30 (IRDT)

Gowmazi Osman (Persian: گومازي عثمان, also romanized as Gowmāzī ʿOs̄mān) is a village in Kambel-e Soleyman Rural District, in the Central District of Chabahar County, Sistan and Baluchestan Province, Iran. At the 2006 census, its population was 21, in 5 families. The name "Gowmazi Osman" means "cow-herder Osman" in the local Balochi language.
