= Gowmazi Saleh =

Gowmazi Saleh گومازي صالح
- Village
- Location within Iran
- Coordinates: 25°25′48″N 60°54′00″E
- Country: Iran
- Province: Sistan and Baluchestan
- County: Chabahar
- Bakhsh: Central
- Rural District: Kambel-e Soleyman

Population (2006)
  - Total: 145
- Time zone: UTC+3:30 (IRST)
  - Summer (DST): UTC+4:30 (IRDT)

Gowmazi Saleh (Persian: گومازي صالح, also Romanized as Gowmāzī Şāleḩ; also known as Gūmāzī) is a village in Kambel-e Soleyman Rural District, in the Central District of Chabahar County, Sistan and Baluchestan Province, Iran. At the 2006 census, its population was 145, in 28 families.
