= Vashnam-e Heydar Saleh Zahi =

Vashnam-e Heydar Saleh Zahi وشنام حيدر صالح زهي
- Village
- Location within Iran
- Coordinates: 25°26′27″N 60°50′23″E
- Country: Iran
- Province: Sistan and Baluchestan
- County: Chabahar
- Bakhsh: Central
- Rural District: Kambel-e Soleyman

Population (2006)
  - Total: 45
- Time zone: UTC+3:30 (IRST)
  - Summer (DST): UTC+4:30 (IRDT)

Vashnam-e Heydar Saleh Zahi (Persian: وشنام حيدر صالح زهي, also Romanized as Vashnām-e Ḩeydar Şāleḩ Zahī; also known as Vashnām, Vashnām-e Bālā, and Vashnām-e Ḩeydar) is a village in Kambel-e Soleyman Rural District, in the Central District of Chabahar County, Sistan and Baluchestan Province, Iran. At the 2006 census, its population was 45, in 8 families.
