= Gurankesh-e Jamaat =

Gurankesh-e Jamaat گورانكش جماعت
- Village
- Location within Iran
- Coordinates: 25°18′00″N 60°52′43″E
- Country: Iran
- Province: Sistan and Baluchestan
- County: Chabahar
- Bakhsh: Central
- Rural District: Kambel-e Soleyman

Population (2006)
  - Total: 186
- Time zone: UTC+3:30 (IRST)
  - Summer (DST): UTC+4:30 (IRDT)

Gurankesh-e Jamaat (Persian: گورانكش جماعت, also Romanized as Gūrānkesh-e Jamā‘at; also known as Gūrān Kesh, and Gūrānkesh-e Vosţá) is a village in Kambel-e Soleyman Rural District, in the Central District of Chabahar County, Sistan and Baluchestan Province, Iran. At the 2006 census, its population was 186, in 40 families.
