= Morad Mohammad Bazar, Polan =

Morad Mohammad Bazar مرادمحمدبازار
- Village
- Location within Iran
- Coordinates: 25°37′33″N 61°00′31″E
- Country: Iran
- Province: Sistan and Baluchestan
- County: Chabahar
- Bakhsh: Polan
- Rural District: Polan

Population (2006)
  - Total: 80
- Time zone: UTC+3:30 (IRST)
  - Summer (DST): UTC+4:30 (IRDT)

Morad Mohammad Bazar (Persian: مرادمحمدبازار, also Romanized as Morād Moḩammad Bāzār) is a village in Polan Rural District, Polan District, Chabahar County, Sistan and Baluchestan Province, Iran. At the 2006 census, its population was 80, in 17 families.
