= Gowmazi Jari =

Gowmazi Jari گومازي جاري
- Village
- Country: Iran
- Province: Sistan and Baluchestan
- County: Chabahar
- Bakhsh: Central
- Rural District: Kambel-e Soleyman

Population (2006)
  - Total: 78
- Time zone: UTC+3:30 (IRST)
  - Summer (DST): UTC+4:30 (IRDT)

Gowmazi Jari (Persian: گومازي جاري, also Romanized as Gowmāzī Jārī; also known as Bāzār Dād Khodā) is a village in Kambel-e Soleyman Rural District, in the Central District of Chabahar County, Sistan and Baluchestan Province, Iran. At the 2006 census, its population was 78, in 14 families.
