= Vashnam-e Hajji Ramazan =

Vashnam-e Hajji Ramazan وشنام حاجي رمضان
- Village
- Location within Iran
- Coordinates: 25°23′10″N 60°48′45″E
- Country: Iran
- Province: Sistan and Baluchestan
- County: Chabahar
- Bakhsh: Central
- Rural District: Kambel-e Soleyman

Population (2006)
  - Total: 94
- Time zone: UTC+3:30 (IRST)
  - Summer (DST): UTC+4:30 (IRDT)

Vashnam-e Hajji Ramazan (Persian: وشنام حاجي رمضان, also Romanized as Vashnām-e Ḩājjī Ramaẕān) is a village in Kambel-e Soleyman Rural District, in the Central District of Chabahar County, Sistan and Baluchestan Province, Iran. At the 2006 census, its population was 94, in 20 families.
