= Nadekan-e Jami =

Nadekan-e Jami ندکان جمعي
- Village
- Location within Iran
- Coordinates: 25°37′53″N 60°51′31″E
- Country: Iran
- Province: Sistan and Baluchestan
- County: Chabahar
- Bakhsh: Central
- Rural District: Pir Sohrab

Population (2006)
  - Total: 137
- Time zone: UTC+3:30 (IRST)
  - Summer (DST): UTC+4:30 (IRDT)

Nadekan-e Jami (Persian: ندکان جمعي, also Romanized as Nadekān-e Jamʿī; also known as Nadakān, Nadehkān, Nadehkān Dashar, Nadeh Kān-e Jowm‘ī, and Nadekān) is a village in Pir Sohrab Rural District, in the Central District of Chabahar County, Sistan and Baluchestan Province, Iran. At the 2006 census, its population was 137, in 30 families.
