= Komb-e Moradabad =

Village in Sistan and Baluchestan province, Iran

Komb-e Moradabad Persian: کمب مراد آباد
- Village
- Location within Iran
- Coordinates: 25°17′14″N 60°41′57″E
- Country: Iran
- Province: Sistan and Baluchestan
- County: Chabahar
- District: Central
- Rural District: Kambel-e Soleyman

Population (2016)
  - Total: 12,906
- Time zone: UTC+3:30 (IRST)

Komb-e Moradabad (Persian: کمب مراد آباد) (Note: Also romanized as Komb-e Morādābād; also known as Komb) is a village in Kambel-e Soleyman Rural District of the Central District of Chabahar County, (Note: Formerly Chah Bahar County) Sistan and Baluchestan province, Iran.

== Demographics ==
=== Population ===
At the time of the 2006 National Census, the village's population was 4,531 in 909 households. The following census in 2011 documented that the population and households had more than doubled to 10,953 people in 2,121 households. The 2016 census measured the population of the village as 12,906 people in 3,001 households. It was the most populous village in its rural district.
