= Baloch Got Castle =

Castle in Sistan and Baluchestan province, Iran

Baloch Got castle
- قلعه بلوچ گت

General information
- Type: Castle
- Location: Tis, Chabahar County, Sistan and Baluchestan province, Iran

Baloch Got castle (Persian: قلعه بلوچ گت) is a historical castle located in Chabahar County in Sistan and Baluchestan province, Iran. The longevity of this fortress dates back to the 1st millennium BC.
