= Jangarek-e Bala =

Jangarek-e Bala جنگارك بالا
- Village
- Location within Iran
- Coordinates: 25°40′51″N 61°01′00″E
- Country: Iran
- Province: Sistan and Baluchestan
- County: Chabahar
- Bakhsh: Central
- Rural District: Pir Sohrab

Population (2006)
  - Total: 216
- Time zone: UTC+3:30 (IRST)
  - Summer (DST): UTC+4:30 (IRDT)

Jangarek-e Bala (Persian: جنگارك بالا, also Romanized as Jangārek-e Bālā; also known as Jangārek) is a village in Pir Sohrab Rural District, in the Central District of Chabahar County, Sistan and Baluchestan Province, Iran. At the 2006 census, its population was 216, in 47 families.
