= Faqir Zehi Morad Bazar =

Faqir Zehi Morad Bazar فقيرزهي مرادبازار
- Village
- Country: Iran
- Province: Sistan and Baluchestan
- County: Chabahar
- Bakhsh: Polan
- Rural District: Polan

Population (2006)
  - Total: 345
- Time zone: UTC+3:30 (IRST)
  - Summer (DST): UTC+4:30 (IRDT)

Faqir Zehi Morad Bazar (Persian: فقيرزهي مرادبازار, also Romanized as Faqīr Zehī Morād Bāzār) is a village in Polan Rural District, Polan District, Chabahar County, Sistan and Baluchestan Province, Iran. At the 2006 census, its population was 345, in 65 families.
