= Gazani-ye Taj Mohammad =

Gazani-ye Taj Mohammad گزاني تاج محمد
- Village
- Location within Iran
- Coordinates: 25°36′44″N 61°04′18″E
- Country: Iran
- Province: Sistan and Baluchestan
- County: Chabahar
- Bakhsh: Polan
- Rural District: Polan

Population (2006)
  - Total: 396
- Time zone: UTC+3:30 (IRST)
  - Summer (DST): UTC+4:30 (IRDT)

Gazani-ye Taj Mohammad (Persian: گزاني تاج محمد, also Romanized as Gazānī-ye Tāj Moḩammad; also known as Gazāfī Tāj Moḩammad, Gazānī-e Bālā, Gazānī-ye Bālā, and Gozānī Bālā) is a village in Polan Rural District, Polan District, Chabahar County, Sistan and Baluchestan Province, Iran. At the 2006 census, its population was 396, in 80 families.
