= Sheykh Ebrahim Bazar Arab Zehi =

Sheykh Ebrahim Bazar Arab Zehi شيخ ابراهيم بازارعربزهي
- Village
- Location within Iran
- Coordinates: 25°38′42″N 60°58′49″E
- Country: Iran
- Province: Sistan and Baluchestan
- County: Chabahar
- Bakhsh: Polan
- Rural District: Polan

Population (2006)
  - Total: 156
- Time zone: UTC+3:30 (IRST)
  - Summer (DST): UTC+4:30 (IRDT)

Sheykh Ebrahim Bazar Arab Zehi (Persian: شيخ ابراهيم بازارعربزهي, also Romanized as Sheykh Ebrāhīm Bāzār ʿArab Zehī; also known as Sheykh Bāzār) is a village in Polan Rural District, Polan District, Chabahar County, Sistan and Baluchestan Province, Iran. At the 2006 census, its population was 156, in 29 families.
