= Dadrahman Bazar =

Dadrahman Bazar (Persian: داد رحمان بازار) may refer to:

- Dadrahman Bazar, Chabahar
- Dadrahman Bazar, Polan, Chabahar County
