= Kambel-e Soleyman =

Village in Sistan and Baluchestan province, Iran

Kambel-e Soleyman Persian: كمبل سليمان
- Village
- Location within Iran
- Coordinates: 25°22′46″N 60°52′30″E
- Country: Iran
- Province: Sistan and Baluchestan
- County: Chabahar
- District: Central
- Rural District: Kambel-e Soleyman

Population (2016)
  - Total: 872
- Time zone: UTC+3:30 (IRST)

Kambel-e Soleyman (Persian: كمبل سليمان) (Note: Also romanized as Kambel-e Soleymān; also known as Kambal, Kambel, and Kambel-e Bālā) is a village in, and the capital of, Kambel-e Soleyman Rural District of the Central District of Chabahar County, (Note: Formerly Chah Bahar County) Sistan and Baluchestan province, Iran.

== Demographics ==
=== Population ===
At the time of the 2006 National Census, the village's population was 703 in 143 households. The census in 2011 counted 926 people in 211 households. The 2016 census measured the population of the village as 872 people in 197 households.
