= Mohammad Bazar =

Mohammad Bazar may refer to:

- Ali Mohammad Bazar, a village in Pir Sohrab Rural District, Central District, Chabahar County, Sistan and Baluchestan Province, Iran
- Mohammad Bazar, Birbhum, a village in Mohammad Bazar CD Block, Suri Sadar subdivision, Birbhum district, West Bengal, India
- Mohammad Bazar (community development block), a community development block that forms an administrative division in Suri Sadar subdivision, Birbhum district West Bengal, India
