= Polan, Iran =

City in Sistan and Baluchestan province, Iran

Polan Persian: پلان
- City
- Location within Iran
- Coordinates: 25°35′43″N 61°06′01″E
- Country: Iran
- Province: Sistan and Baluchestan
- County: Chabahar
- District: Polan

Population (2016)
  - Total: 1,044
- Time zone: UTC+3:30 (IRST)

Polan (Persian: پلان) (Note: Also romanized as Polān; also known as Dasht-e Yārī, Dashtīāri, Mīr Bāzār, and Miri Bazār) is a city in, and the capital of, Polan District of Chabahar County, (Note: Formerly Chah Bahar County) Sistan and Baluchestan province, Iran. It also serves as the administrative center for Polan Rural District.

== Demographics ==
=== Population ===
At the time of the 2006 National Census, Polan's population was 1,002 in 199 households, when it was a village in Polan Rural District. The following census in 2011 counted 1,167 people in 297 households. The 2016 census measured the population of the village as 1,044 people in 283 households.

After the census, Polan was elevated to the status of a city.
