= Tis, Iran =

Tis تيس
- Village
- Location within Iran
- Coordinates: 25°21′25″N 60°37′15″E
- Country: Iran
- Province: Sistan and Baluchestan
- County: Chabahar
- Bakhsh: Central
- Rural District: Kambel-e Soleyman

Population (2006)
  - Total: 3,873
- Time zone: UTC+3:30 (IRST)
  - Summer (DST): UTC+4:30 (IRDT)

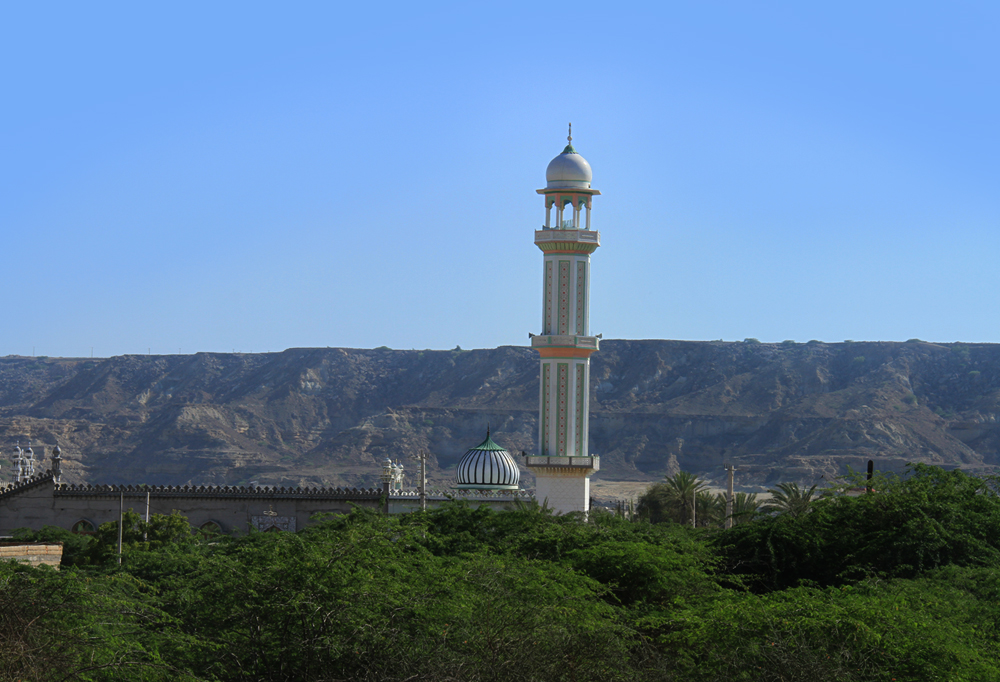
Chabahar Tiss Great Mosque

Tis (Persian: تيس, also Romanized as Tīs and Ţīs; also known as Tīz and Tīz Post) is a village in Kambel-e Soleyman Rural District, in the Central District of Chabahar County, Sistan and Baluchestan Province, Iran. At the 2006 census, its population was 3,873, in 776 families.
