= Vashnam-e Dari Rural District =

Rural district in Sistan and Baluchestan province, Iran

Vashnam-e Dari Rural District Persian: دهستان وشنام دری
- Rural District
- Location within Iran
- Coordinates: 25°26′48″N 60°46′43″E
- Country: Iran
- Province: Sistan and Baluchestan
- County: Chabahar
- District: Central
- Capital: Vashnam-e Dari
- Time zone: UTC+3:30 (IRST)

Vashnam-e Dari Rural District (Persian: دهستان وشنام دری) is in the Central District of Chabahar County, (Note: Formerly Chah Bahar County) Sistan and Baluchestan province, Iran. Its capital is the village of Vashnam-e Dari, whose population at the time of the 2016 National Census was 665 people.

== History ==
Vashnam-e Dari Rural District was created in the Central District after the 2016 census.
