= Gar Kandi, Khuzestan =

Gar Kandi گركندي
- Village
- Location within Iran
- Coordinates: 32°46′52″N 49°18′19″E
- Country: Iran
- Province: Khuzestan
- County: Dezful
- Bakhsh: Sardasht
- Rural District: Darreh Kayad

Population (2006)
  - Total: 34
- Time zone: UTC+3:30 (IRST)
  - Summer (DST): UTC+4:30 (IRDT)

Gar Kandi (Persian: گركندي, also Romanized as Gar Kandī) is a village in Darreh Kayad Rural District, Sardasht District, Dezful County, Khuzestan Province, Iran. At the 2006 census, its population was 34, in 4 families.
