= Pir Sohrab District =

Pir Sohrab District Persian: بخش پيرسهراب
- District
- Location within Iran
- Coordinates: 25°39′03″N 60°52′03″E
- Country: Iran
- Province: Sistan and Baluchestan
- County: Chabahar
- Capital: Pir Sohrab
- Time zone: UTC+3:30 (IRST)

Pir Sohrab District (Persian: بخش پيرسهراب) is in Chabahar County, (Note: Formerly Chah Bahar County) Sistan and Baluchestan province, Iran. Its capital is the village of Pir Sohrab, whose population at the time of the 2016 National Census was 675, in 110 households.

== History ==
After the 2016 census, Pir Sohrab Rural District was separated from the Central District in the formation of Pir Sohrab District.

== Demographics ==
=== Administrative divisions ===
Pir Sohrab District
Administrative Divisions
Bajar Bazar RD
Pir Sohrab RD
RD = Rural District
