= Kambel-e Soleyman Rural District =

Rural district in Sistan and Baluchestan province, Iran

Kambel-e Soleyman Rural District Persian: دهستان كمبل سليمان
- Rural District
- Location within Iran
- Coordinates: 25°17′56″N 60°49′04″E
- Country: Iran
- Province: Sistan and Baluchestan
- County: Chabahar
- District: Central
- Capital: Kambel-e Soleyman

Population (2016)
  - Total: 38,268
- Time zone: UTC+3:30 (IRST)

Kambel-e Soleyman Rural District (Persian: دهستان كمبل سليمان) is in the Central District of Chabahar County, (Note: Formerly Chah Bahar County) Sistan and Baluchestan province, Iran. Its capital is the village of Kambel-e Soleyman.

== Demographics ==
=== Population ===
At the time of the 2006 National Census, the rural district's population was 21,803 in 4,285 households. There were 33,482 inhabitants in 7,163 households at the following census of 2011. The 2016 census measured the population of the rural district as 38,268 in 8,854 households. The most populous of its 74 villages was Komb-e Moradabad, with 12,906 people.
