= Pir Sohrab Rural District =

Rural district in Sistan and Baluchestan province, Iran

Pir Sohrab Rural District Persian: دهستان پيرسهراب
- Rural District
- Location within Iran
- Coordinates: 25°39′03″N 60°52′03″E
- Country: Iran
- Province: Sistan and Baluchestan
- County: Chabahar
- District: Pir Sohrab
- Capital: Owraki Bozorg-e Olya

Population (2016)
  - Total: 25,265
- Time zone: UTC+3:30 (IRST)

Pir Sohrab Rural District (Persian: دهستان پيرسهراب) is in Pir Sohrab District of Chabahar County, (Note: Formerly Chah Bahar County) Sistan and Baluchestan province, Iran. Its capital is the village of Owraki Bozorg-e Olya. The previous capital of the rural district was the village of Pir Sohrab.

== Demographics ==
=== Population ===
At the time of the 2006 National Census, the rural district's population (as a part of the Central District) was 20,281 in 3,798 households. There were 23,952 inhabitants in 5,347 households at the following census of 2011. The 2016 census measured the population of the rural district as 25,265 in 6,493 households. The most populous of its 116 villages was Owraki Bozorg-e Olya, with 417 people.

After the census, the rural district was separated from the district in the establishment of Pir Sohrab District.
