= Polan Rural District =

Rural district in Sistan and Baluchestan province, Iran

Polan Rural District Persian: دهستان پلان
- Rural District
- Location within Iran
- Coordinates: 25°39′58″N 61°07′18″E
- Country: Iran
- Province: Sistan and Baluchestan
- County: Chabahar
- District: Polan
- Capital: Polan

Population (2016)
  - Total: 33,004
- Time zone: UTC+3:30 (IRST)

Polan Rural District (Persian: دهستان پلان) is in Polan District of Chabahar County, (Note: Formerly Chah Bahar County) Sistan and Baluchestan province, Iran. It is administered from the city of Polan.

== Demographics ==
=== Population ===
At the time of the 2006 National Census, the rural district's population was 28,799 in 5,352 households. There were 31,767 inhabitants in 7,275 households at the following census of 2011. The 2016 census measured the population of the rural district as 33,004 in 8,812 households. The most populous of its 116 villages was Sediq Zehi, with 1,852 people.
