= Polan District =

District in Sistan and Baluchestan province, Iran

Polan District Persian: بخش پلان
- District
- Location within Iran
- Coordinates: 25°39′58″N 61°07′18″E
- Country: Iran
- Province: Sistan and Baluchestan
- County: Chabahar
- Capital: Polan

Population (2016)
  - Total: 33,004
- Time zone: UTC+3:30 (IRST)

Polan District (Persian: بخش پلان) is in Chabahar County, (Note: Formerly Chah Bahar County) Sistan and Baluchestan province, in the southeastern part of Iran. Its capital is the city of Polan.

== History ==
After the 2011 National Census, Talang Rural District was separated from the district to join Qasr-e Qand County. After the 2016 census, the village of Polan was elevated to the status of a city.

== Demographics ==
=== Population ===
At the time of the 2006 census, the district's population was 43,050 in 8,416 households. The 2011 census counted 48,241 people in 11,239 households. The 2016 census measured the population of the district as 33,004 inhabitants in 8,812 households.

=== Administrative divisions ===
Polan District Population
Administrative Divisions	2006	2011	2016
Polan RD	28,799	31,767	33,004
Talang RD (Note: Transferred to Qasr-e Qand County)	14,251	16,474	
Polan (city) (Note: Became a city after the 2016 census)			
Total	43,050	48,241	33,004
RD = Rural District
