= Central District (Chabahar County) =

District in Sistan and Baluchestan province, Iran

Central District (Chabahar County) Persian: بخش مرکزی شهرستان چابھار
- District
- Location within Iran
- Coordinates: 25°24′15″N 60°48′45″E
- Country: Iran
- Province: Sistan and Baluchestan
- County: Chabahar
- Capital: Chabahar

Population (2016)
  - Total: 170,272
- Time zone: UTC+3:30 (IRST)

The Central District of Chabahar County (Persian: بخش مرکزی شهرستان چابھار) (Note: Formerly Chah Bahar County) is in Sistan and Baluchestan province, Iran. Its capital is the city of Chabahar. (Note: Formerly Chah Bahar)

== History ==
After the 2016 National Census, Vashnam-e Dari Rural District was created in the district, and Pir Sohrab Rural District was separated from it in the formation of Pir Sohrab District.

== Demographics ==
=== Population ===
At the time of the 2006 census, the district's population was 113,154 in 21,920 households. The following census in 2011 counted 143,067 people in 31,823 households. The 2016 census measured the population of the district as 170,272 inhabitants in 41,243 households.

=== Administrative divisions ===
Central District (Chabahar County) Population
Administrative Divisions	2006	2011	2016
Kambel-e Soleyman RD	21,803	33,482	38,268
Pir Sohrab RD (Note: Transferred to Pir Sohrab District after the 2016 census)	20,281	23,952	25,265
Vashnam-e Dari RD (Note: Established after the 2016 census)			
Chabahar (city)	71,070	85,633	106,739
Total	113,154	143,067	170,272
RD = Rural District
