= Chabahar County =

County in Sistan and Baluchestan province, Iran

Chabahar County Persian: شهرستان چابهار
- County
- Location of Chabahar County in Sistan and Baluchestan province (bottom center, yellow)

- Location of Sistan and Baluchestan province in Iran
- Coordinates: 25°29′N 60°54′E
- Country: Iran
- Province: Sistan and Baluchestan
- Capital: Chabahar
- Districts: Central, Pir Sohrab, Polan

Population (2016)
  - Total: 283,204
- Time zone: UTC+3:30 (IRST)

Chabahar County (Persian: شهرستان چابهار) (Note: Formerly Chah Bahar County (شهرستان چاه بهار)) is in Sistan and Baluchestan province, Iran. Its capital is the port city of Chabahar (Note: Formerly Chah Bahar) on the coast of the Gulf of Oman.

== History ==
After the 2011 National Census, Talang Rural District was separated from the county to join Qasr-e Qand County. After the 2016 census, the village of Polan was elevated to the status of a city.

In 2018, Dashtiari District was separated from the county in the establishment of Dashtiari County. Vashnam-e Dari Rural District was created in the Central District, and Pir Sohrab Rural District was separated from it in the formation of Pir Sohrab District, including the new Bajar Bazar Rural District.

== Demographics ==
=== Language and ethnicity ===
The aboriginal residents in the city of Chabahar are the Baluch. In recent years, many people have immigrated to Chabahar from other parts of Iran to find a better life. Immigration changed Chabahar's face dramatically. Today Chabahar has a mix of different ethnicities including Baluchs, Turks, Persian Sistanis (Zabolis), and other peoples of Iran.

=== Population ===
As of 2008, more than half of the county's population were living in rural areas; the urban population is 77,128, of which a majority reside in the city of Chabahar. At the time of the 2006 census, the county's population was 214,017 in 41,532 households. The following census in 2011 counted 264,051 people in 58,039 households. The 2016 census measured the population of the county as 283,204 in 68,147 households.

=== Administrative divisions ===
Chabahar County's population history and administrative structure over three consecutive censuses are shown in the following table.

Chabahar County Population
Administrative Divisions	2006	2011	2016
Central District	113,154	143,067	170,272
Kambel-e Soleyman RD	21,803	33,482	38,268
Pir Sohrab RD	20,281	23,952	25,265
Vashnam-e Dari RD (Note: Established after the 2016 census)			
Chabahar (city)	71,070	85,633	106,739
Dashtiari District (Note: Transferred to Dashtiari County after the 2016 census)	57,813	72,743	79,911
Bahu Kalat RD	24,478	30,646	34,748
Negur RD	17,425	19,831	21,092
Sand-e Mir Suiyan RD	12,151	17,654	18,401
Negur (city)	3,759	4,612	5,670
Pir Sohrab District			
Bajar Bazar RD			
Pir Sohrab RD			
Polan District	43,050	48,241	33,004
Polan RD	28,799	31,767	33,004
Talang RD (Note: Transferred to Qasr-e Qand County)	14,251	16,474	
Polan (city) (Note: Became a city after the 2016 census)			
Total	214,017	264,051	283,204
RD = Rural District

== Economy ==
Traditionally, the people of Chabahar County were employed in fishing and agriculture, with some coastal trade. In the 1970s Iran established a naval station and an air base there. In the 1980s the port facilities at Chabahar were developed during the Iran–Iraq War, and further developed in the 1990s. The Chabahar Free Trade-Industrial Zone was established in 1992. These developments changed the county from primarily rural, to an urban–rural mix.

Chabahar County is the site of Iran's ballistic missile test range.

== Tourism ==
Although some opportunities exist in Chabahar County for tourists, such as the village of Tis, folk festivals, and unusual landforms, tourism is undeveloped in the county.

== See also ==
Media related to Chabahar County at Wikimedia Commons
