= Zarabad =

Zarabad (Persian: زراباد) may refer to:

- Zarabad, Bashagard, Hormozgan Province, Iran
- Zarabad, Minab, Hormozgan Province
- Zarabad, Markazi, Iran
- Zarabad, Qazvin, Iran
- Zarabad, Sistan and Baluchestan, Iran
- Zarabad, West Azerbaijan, Iran
- Zarabad County, Sistan and Baluchestan, Iran
- Zarabad District, Sistan and Baluchestan, Iran
- Zarabod, Gojal, Gilgit-Baltistan, Pakistan
