= Darak, Iran =

Darak or Derak (Persian: درك or دارك) in Iran may refer to:

- Darak, Khuzestan (دارك - Dārak)
- Darak, Qazvin (درك - Darak)
- Darak, Zarabad (درك - Darak), village in Sistan and Baluchestan province
- Derak Rural District, in Fars province
- Mount Derak, a sedimentary rock mountain located in Shiraz, Fars
