= Tanbalan =

Village in Sistan and Baluchestan province, Iran

Tanbalan Persian: تنبلان
- Village
- Location within Iran
- Coordinates: 25°44′53″N 59°19′26″E
- Country: Iran
- Province: Sistan and Baluchestan
- County: Zarabad
- District: Karvan
- Rural District: Tanbalan

Population (2016)
  - Total: 243
- Time zone: UTC+3:30 (IRST)

Tanbalan (Persian: تنبلان) (Note: Also romanized as Tanbalān) is a village in, and the capital of, Tanbalan Rural District of Karvan District, Zarabad County, Sistan and Baluchestan province, Iran.

== Demographics ==
=== Population ===
At the time of the 2006 National Census, the village's population was 455 in 119 households, when it was in Zarabad-e Gharbi Rural District (Note: Formerly Zarabad Rural District) of Zarabad District (Note: Renamed the Central District of Zarabad County) in Konarak County. The following census in 2011 counted 188 people in 50 households. The 2016 census measured the population of the village as 243 people in 61 households.

After the census, the district was separated from the county in the establishment of Zarabad County and renamed the Central District. The rural district was transferred to the new Karvan District, and Tanbalan was transferred to Tanbalan Rural District created in the district.
