= Zarabad, Zarabad =

Neighborhood in Sistan and Baluchestan province, Iran

Zarabad Persian: زرآباد
- Neighborhood
- Location within Iran
- Coordinates: 25°34′44″N 59°23′13″E
- Country: Iran
- Province: Sistan and Baluchestan
- County: Zarabad
- District: Central
- City: Zarabad

Population (2006)
  - Total: 914
- Time zone: UTC+3:30 (IRST)

Zarabad (Persian: زرآباد) is a neighborhood in the city of Zarabad (Note: Formerly the village of Jahelu) in the Central District (Note: Formerly Zarabad District of Konarak County) of Zarabad County, Sistan and Baluchestan province, Iran.

== Demographics ==
=== Population ===
At the time of the 2006 National Census, Zarabad's population was 914 in 180 households, when it was a village in Zarabad-e Sharqi Rural District of Zarabad District (Note: Renamed the Central District of Zarabad County) of Konarak County.

After the census, the village of Jahelu merged with the village of Zarabad and was elevated to city status as Zarabad. After the 2016 census, the district was separated from the county in the establishment of Zarabad County and renamed the Central District. The city and the rural district were transferred to the new district, with Zarabad as the county's capital.
