= Eslamabad-e Lash =

Village in Sistan and Baluchestan province, Iran

Eslamabad-e Lash Persian: اسلام‌آباد لاش
- Village
- Location within Iran
- Coordinates: 25°36′38″N 59°21′41″E
- Country: Iran
- Province: Sistan and Baluchestan
- County: Zarabad
- District: Karvan
- Rural District: Zarabad-e Gharbi

Population (2016)
  - Total: 462
- Time zone: UTC+3:30 (IRST)

Eslamabad-e Lash (Persian: اسلام‌آباد لاش) is a village in, and the capital of, Zarabad-e Gharbi Rural District (Note: Formerly Zarabad Rural District) of Karvan District, Zarabad County, Sistan and Baluchestan province, Iran.

== Demographics ==
=== Population ===
At the time of the 2006 National Census, the village's population was 635 in 110 households, when it was in Zarabad District. (Note: Renamed the Central District of Zarabad County) The following census in 2011 counted 613 people in 123 households. The 2016 census measured the population of the village as 462 people in 113 households.

After the census, the district was separated from the county in the establishment of Zarabad County and renamed the Central District. The rural district was transferred to the new Karvan District.
