= Zardin Kahir =

Zardin Kahir زردين كهير
- Village
- Location within Iran
- Coordinates: 25°39′05″N 59°25′26″E
- Country: Iran
- Province: Sistan and Baluchestan
- County: Konarak
- Bakhsh: Zarabad
- Rural District: Zarabad-e Sharqi

Population (2006)
  - Total: 70
- Time zone: UTC+3:30 (IRST)
  - Summer (DST): UTC+4:30 (IRDT)

Zardin Kahir (Persian: زردين كهير, also Romanized as Zardīn Kahīr; also known as Zardeh Kahīr) is a village in Zarabad-e Sharqi Rural District, Zarabad District, Konarak County, Sistan and Baluchestan Province, Iran. At the 2006 census, its population was 70, in 13 families.
