= Moradi Kashk =

Moradi Kashk مرادئ كشك
- Village
- Location within Iran
- Coordinates: 25°39′01″N 59°21′44″E
- Country: Iran
- Province: Sistan and Baluchestan
- County: Konarak
- Bakhsh: Zarabad
- Rural District: Zarabad-e Gharbi

Population (2006)
  - Total: 141
- Time zone: UTC+3:30 (IRST)
  - Summer (DST): UTC+4:30 (IRDT)

Moradi Kashk (Persian: مرادئ كشك, also Romanized as Morādi Kashk; also known as Morādī Gashk) is a village in Zarabad-e Gharbi Rural District, Zarabad District, Konarak County, Sistan and Baluchestan Province, Iran. At the 2006 census, its population was 141, in 25 families.
