= Tujak =

Tujak توجك
- Village
- Location within Iran
- Coordinates: 25°30′28″N 59°34′52″E
- Country: Iran
- Province: Sistan and Baluchestan
- County: Konarak
- Bakhsh: Zarabad
- Rural District: Zarabad-e Sharqi

Population (2006)
  - Total: 37
- Time zone: UTC+3:30 (IRST)
  - Summer (DST): UTC+4:30 (IRDT)

Tujak (Persian: توجك, also Romanized as Tūjak; also known as Tūrjak) is a village in Zarabad-e Sharqi Rural District, Zarabad District, Konarak County, Sistan and Baluchestan Province, Iran. At the 2006 census, its population was 37, in 11 families.
