= Esmail Chat =

Village in Sistan and Baluchestan province, Iran

Esmail Chat Persian: اسماعيل چات
- Village
- Location within Iran
- Coordinates: 25°38′39″N 59°24′51″E
- Country: Iran
- Province: Sistan and Baluchestan
- County: Zarabad
- District: Central
- Rural District: Esmail Chat

Population (2016)
  - Total: 831
- Time zone: UTC+3:30 (IRST)

Esmail Chat (Persian: اسماعيل چات) (Note: Also romanized as Esmā‘īl Chāt; also known as Bajnak Chāt) is a village in, and the capital of, Esmail Chat Rural District of the Central District (Note: Formerly Zarabad District of Konarak County) of Zarabad County, Sistan and Baluchestan province, Iran.

== Demographics ==
=== Population ===
At the time of the 2006 National Census, the village's population was 498 in 70 households, when it was in Zarabad-e Sharqi Rural District of Zarabad District (Note: Renamed the Central District of Zarabad County) in Konarak County. The following census in 2011 counted 732 people in 159 households. The 2016 census measured the population of the village as 831 people in 189 households. It was the most populous village in its rural district.

After the census, the district was separated from the county in the establishment of Zarabad County and renamed the Central District. Esmail Chat was transferred to Esmail Chat Rural District created in the district.
