= Shahr Dar-e Bala =

Shahr Dar-e Bala شهردربالا
- Village
- Location within Iran
- Coordinates: 25°40′21″N 59°16′29″E
- Country: Iran
- Province: Sistan and Baluchestan
- County: Konarak
- Bakhsh: Zarabad
- Rural District: Zarabad-e Gharbi

Population (2006)
  - Total: 437
- Time zone: UTC+3:30 (IRST)
  - Summer (DST): UTC+4:30 (IRDT)

Shahr Dar-e Bala (Persian: شهردربالا, also Romanized as Shahr Dar-e Bālā; also known as Shahr Dar and Shahr-i-dār) is a village in Zarabad-e Gharbi Rural District, Zarabad District, Konarak County, Sistan and Baluchestan Province, Iran. At the 2006 census, its population was 437, in 82 families.
