= Gerdilash =

Gerdilash گردي لاش
- Village
- Location within Iran
- Coordinates: 25°52′48″N 59°24′11″E
- Country: Iran
- Province: Sistan and Baluchestan
- County: Konarak
- Bakhsh: Zarabad
- Rural District: Zarabad-e Gharbi

Population (2006)
  - Total: 53
- Time zone: UTC+3:30 (IRST)
  - Summer (DST): UTC+4:30 (IRDT)

Gerdilash (Persian: گردي لاش, also Romanized as Gerdīlāsh) is a village in Zarabad-e Gharbi Rural District, Zarabad District, Konarak County, Sistan and Baluchestan Province, Iran. At the 2006 census, its population was 53, in 15 families.
