= Bangelui =

Bangelui بنگلوئي
- Village
- Location within Iran
- Coordinates: 25°28′40″N 59°29′10″E
- Country: Iran
- Province: Sistan and Baluchestan
- County: Konarak
- Bakhsh: Zarabad
- Rural District: Zarabad-e Sharqi

Population (2006)
  - Total: 110
- Time zone: UTC+3:30 (IRST)
  - Summer (DST): UTC+4:30 (IRDT)

Bangelui (Persian: بنگلوئي, also Romanized as Bangelū’ī; also known as Bangelūee) is a village in Zarabad-e Sharqi Rural District, Zarabad District, Konarak County, Sistan and Baluchestan Province, Iran. At the 2006 census, its population was 110, in 27 families.
