= Suru, Sistan and Baluchestan =

Village in Sistan and Baluchestan province, Iran

Suru Persian: سورو
- Village
- Location within Iran
- Coordinates: 25°41′41″N 59°13′37″E
- Country: Iran
- Province: Sistan and Baluchestan
- County: Zarabad
- District: Karvan
- Rural District: Zarabad-e Gharbi

Population (2016)
  - Total: 1,372
- Time zone: UTC+3:30 (IRST)

Suru (Persian: سورو) is a village in Zarabad-e Gharbi Rural District (Note: Formerly Zarabad Rural District) of Karvan District, Zarabad County, Sistan and Baluchestan province, Iran, serving as capital of the district.

== Demographics ==
=== Population ===
At the time of the 2006 National Census, the village's population was 982 in 270 households, when it was in Zarabad District (Note: Renamed the Central District of Zarabad County) of Konarak County. The following census in 2011 counted 1,168 people in 312 households. The 2016 census measured the population of the village as 1,372 people in 381 households. It was the most populous village in its rural district.

After the census, the district was separated from the county in the establishment of Zarabad County and renamed the Central District. The rural district was transferred to the new Karvan District.
