= Tujak-e Jadid =

Tujak-e Jadid توجک جديد
- Village
- Location within Iran
- Coordinates: 25°32′59″N 59°31′37″E
- Country: Iran
- Province: Sistan and Baluchestan
- County: Konarak
- Bakhsh: Zarabad
- Rural District: Zarabad-e Sharqi

Population (2006)
  - Total: 65
- Time zone: UTC+3:30 (IRST)
  - Summer (DST): UTC+4:30 (IRDT)

Tujak-e Jadid (Persian: توجک جديد, also Romanized as Tūjak-e Jadīd) is a village in Zarabad-e Sharqi Rural District, Zarabad District, Konarak County, Sistan and Baluchestan Province, Iran. At the 2006 census, its population was 65, in 15 families.
