= Gazidar =

Gazidar گزيدر
- Village
- Location within Iran
- Coordinates: 25°31′23″N 59°26′01″E
- Country: Iran
- Province: Sistan and Baluchestan
- County: Konarak
- Bakhsh: Zarabad
- Rural District: Zarabad-e Sharqi

Population (2006)
  - Total: 228
- Time zone: UTC+3:30 (IRST)
  - Summer (DST): UTC+4:30 (IRDT)

Gazidar (Persian: گزيدر, also Romanized as Gazīdar) is a village in Zarabad-e Sharqi Rural District, Zarabad District, Konarak County, Sistan and Baluchestan Province, Iran. At the 2006 census, its population was 228, in 51 families.
