= Kalat-e Jahal =

Kalat-e Jahal کلات جهل
- Village
- Location within Iran
- Coordinates: 25°24′32″N 59°37′57″E
- Country: Iran
- Province: Sistan and Baluchestan
- County: Konarak
- Bakhsh: Zarabad
- Rural District: Zarabad-e Sharqi

Population (2006)
  - Total: 154
- Time zone: UTC+3:30 (IRST)
  - Summer (DST): UTC+4:30 (IRDT)

Kalat-e Jahal (Persian: کلات جهل, also Romanized as Kalāt-e Jahal) is a village in Zarabad-e Sharqi Rural District, Zarabad District, Konarak County, Sistan and Baluchestan Province, Iran. At the 2006 census, its population was 154, in 38 families.
