= Sandsar =

Sandsar سندسر
- Village
- Location within Iran
- Coordinates: 25°43′12″N 59°13′22″E
- Country: Iran
- Province: Sistan and Baluchestan
- County: Konarak
- Bakhsh: Zarabad
- Rural District: Zarabad-e Gharbi

Population (2006)
  - Total: 652
- Time zone: UTC+3:30 (IRST)
  - Summer (DST): UTC+4:30 (IRDT)

Sandsar (Persian: سندسر) is a village in Zarabad-e Gharbi Rural District, Zarabad District, Konarak County, Sistan and Baluchestan Province, Iran. At the 2006 census, its population was 652, in 154 families.
