= Kalat, Sistan and Baluchestan =

Kalat کلات
- Village
- Location within Iran
- Coordinates: 25°25′12″N 59°36′57″E
- Country: Iran
- Province: Sistan and Baluchestan
- County: Konarak
- Bakhsh: Zarabad
- Rural District: Zarabad-e Sharqi

Population (2006)
  - Total: 192
- Time zone: UTC+3:30 (IRST)
  - Summer (DST): UTC+4:30 (IRDT)

Kalat (Persian: کلات, also Romanized as Kalāt; also known as Kalāt-e Koch and Kalāt-e Kūch) is a village in Zarabad-e Sharqi Rural District, Zarabad District, Konarak County, Sistan and Baluchestan Province, Iran. At the 2006 census, its population was 192, in 48 families.
