= Tanbalan Rural District =

Rural district in Sistan and Baluchestan province, Iran

Tanbalan Rural District Persian: دهستان تنبلان
- Rural District
- Location within Iran
- Coordinates: 25°51′13″N 59°23′59″E
- Country: Iran
- Province: Sistan and Baluchestan
- County: Zarabad
- District: Karvan
- Capital: Tanbalan
- Time zone: UTC+3:30 (IRST)

Tanbalan Rural District (Persian: دهستان تنبلان) is in Karvan District of Zarabad County, Sistan and Baluchestan province, Iran. Its capital is the village of Tanbalan, whose population at the time of the 2016 National Census was 243 people in 61 households.

== History ==
After the census, Zarabad District (Note: Renamed the Central District of Zarabad County) was separated from Konarak County in the establishment of Zarabad County and renamed the Central District. Tanbalan Rural District was created in the new Karvan District.
