= Arturo Bandini =

Arturo Bandini may refer to:

- An album by Züri West
- Arturo Gabriel Bandini, the main character and alter ego of John Fante in his four 'Bandini' novels
- Arturo Bandini (One Life to Live), a fictional character from the American soap opera, One Life to Live

== See also ==
- Bandini (disambiguation)
