= Zharabad =

Zharabad (Persian: ژاراباد) may refer to:

- Zharabad, Urmia
- Zharabad, Silvaneh, Urmia County
