= Miski =

Miski may refer to:

- Miski, Chad
- Miski, Iran
