= Bagalur =

Bagalur may refer to:

- Bagalur, Bangalore Urban, Karnataka, India
- Bagalur, Hosur, Krishnagiri district, Tamil Nadu, India

== See also ==
- Bagalu, Iran
