= Jod =

Jod or JOD may refer to:

- Jod, alternate name for the deity Velns in Latvian mythology
- Jod, alternate spelling of jor (music), an aspect of Indian music
- Jod, alternate spelling of Yodh, a letter of the Semitic alphabet
- JOD, ISO 4217 code for the Jordanian dinar
- JOD, acronym for John O'Donnell Stadium (now Modern Woodmen Park) in Davenport, Iowa
- JOD, acronym for the SEGA game Nights: Journey of Dreams
- Jód, the Hungarian name for Ieud Commune, Maramureș County, Romania
- Jod, alternate name for the Jack of Diamonds card game
- Jod (element), symbol J, German and Polish name for iodine
- Jod, Iran, a village in Sistan and Baluchestan Province, Iran
- Jen O'Malley Dillon (born 1976), political strategist and former White House deputy chief of staff
