= Maneh-ye Pain =

Maneh-ye Pain منه پايين
- Village
- Location within Iran
- Coordinates: 25°53′53″N 59°34′02″E
- Country: Iran
- Province: Sistan and Baluchestan
- County: Konarak
- Bakhsh: Zarabad
- Rural District: Zarabad-e Gharbi

Population (2006)
  - Total: 126
- Time zone: UTC+3:30 (IRST)
  - Summer (DST): UTC+4:30 (IRDT)

Maneh-ye Pain (Persian: منه پايين, also Romanized as Maneh-ye Pā’īn; also known as Manneh-ye Pāeen) is a village in Zarabad-e Gharbi Rural District, Zarabad District, Konarak County, Sistan and Baluchestan Province, Iran. At the 2006 census, its population was 126, in 25 families.
