= Bandini Kursar =

Bandini Kursar بنديني کورسر
- Village
- Location within Iran
- Coordinates: 25°31′30″N 59°35′45″E
- Country: Iran
- Province: Sistan and Baluchestan
- County: Konarak
- Bakhsh: Zarabad
- Rural District: Zarabad-e Sharqi

Population (2006)
  - Total: 55
- Time zone: UTC+3:30 (IRST)
  - Summer (DST): UTC+4:30 (IRDT)

Bandini Kursar (Persian: بنديني کورسر, also Romanized as Bandīnī Kūrsar; also known as Band Bonī, Bandeynī, Bāndīnī, and Bandīnī) is a village in Zarabad-e Sharqi Rural District, Zarabad District, Konarak County, Sistan and Baluchestan Province, Iran. At the 2006 census, its population was 55, in 13 families.
