= Derg (disambiguation) =

The Derg was a military junta that ruled Ethiopia from 1974 to 1987.

Derg may also refer to:

- Derg, Iran, a village in Qazvin Province

== Ireland ==
- Bodb Derg, a legendary figure in Irish mythology
- Cróeb Derg, or Red Branch, the name of two royal houses of Ulster
- Lough Derg (Shannon), a large lake on the River Shannon, bordering counties Clare, Galway and Tipperary
- Lough Derg, County Donegal, a small lake, a place of Christian pilgrimage
- River Derg, Ulster

== See also ==
- Durg, a city in Chhattisgarh state, India
