= Bandini =

Bandini may refer to:

== Surname ==
- Angelo Maria Bandini (1726–1803), Italian author and librarian
- Arcadia Bandini de Stearns Baker (1825–1912), heiress and daughter of early Californian Juan Bandini
- Domenico Bandini of Arezzo (c. 1335 – 1418), author of Fons memorabilium universi
- Helen Elliott Bandini, American (California) writer, primarily of history
- Ilario Bandini (1911-1992), Italian businessman, racing driver, and founder of Bandini Automobili (see below)
- Juan Bandini (1800–1859), politician and early settler of San Diego, California
- Lorenzo Bandini (1935-1967), Italian motorcar racing driver
- Monica Bandini (1964–2021), Italian road racing cyclist

== Other uses ==
- Arturo Gabriel Bandini, the best known main character and alter ego of John Fante
- Arturo Bandini, a studio album recorded by Züri West in 1991
- Bandini Automobili, an Italian automobile manufacturer from 1946 to 1992, named for its founder, Ilario Bandini
- Bandini (film), a 1963 Indian film directed and produced by Bimal Roy, starring Nutan and Ashok Kumar
- Bandini (TV series), an Indian television soap by Ekta Kapoor
- A type of tankini
- Bandini, Iran, a village in Sistan and Baluchestan Province, Iran

== See also ==
- Bandhini
