= Maneh =

Maneh may refer to:

- Maneh, Iran, a village in North Khorasan Province, Iran
- Maneh District, an administrative subdivision of North Khorasan Province, Iran
- Maneh-ye Pain, a village in Sistan and Baluchestan Province, Iran
- Maneh (given name), an Armenian personal name
- Mordechai Tzvi Maneh (1859–1886), Hebrew poet
- An older spelling for mina (unit), an ancient weight
