= Darak, Zarabad =

Village in Sistan and Baluchestan province, Iran

Darak Persian: درک
- Village
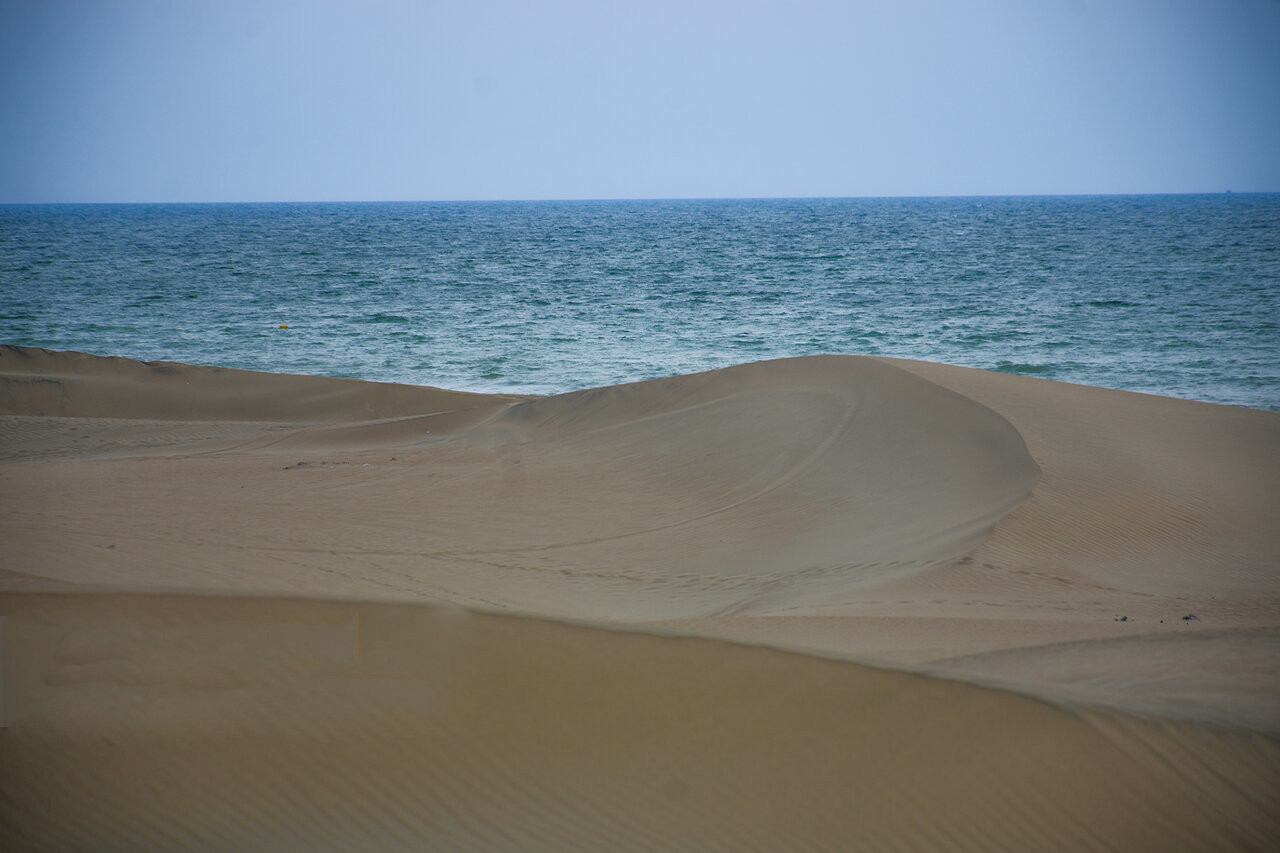

- Location within Iran
- Coordinates: 25°29′03″N 59°28′48″E
- Country: Iran
- Province: Sistan and Baluchestan
- County: Zarabad
- District: Central
- Rural District: Zarabad-e Sharqi

Population (2016)
  - Total: 449
- Time zone: UTC+3:30 (IRST)

Darak (Persian: درک) is a village in Zarabad-e Sharqi Rural District of the Central District. (Note: Formerly Zarabad District of Konarak County)

== Demographics ==
=== Population ===
At the time of the 2006 National Census, the village's population was 352 in 74 households, when it was in Zarabad District (Note: Renamed the Central District of Zarabad County) of Konarak County. The following census in 2011 counted 377 people in 81 households. The 2016 census measured the population of the village as 449 people in 103 households.

After the census, the district was separated from the county in the establishment of Zarabad County and renamed the Central District.

== Tourist attractions ==
The main attraction of the village is the meeting of the desert and the sea, offering sunrise and sunset vistas.

Due to the attention and presence of tourists in recent years, ecotourism facilities have been established in Darak, and rural accommodations are locally available. There is a palm tree far away from other trees that travelers have named Single Tree or Lonely Palm.

== Gallery ==
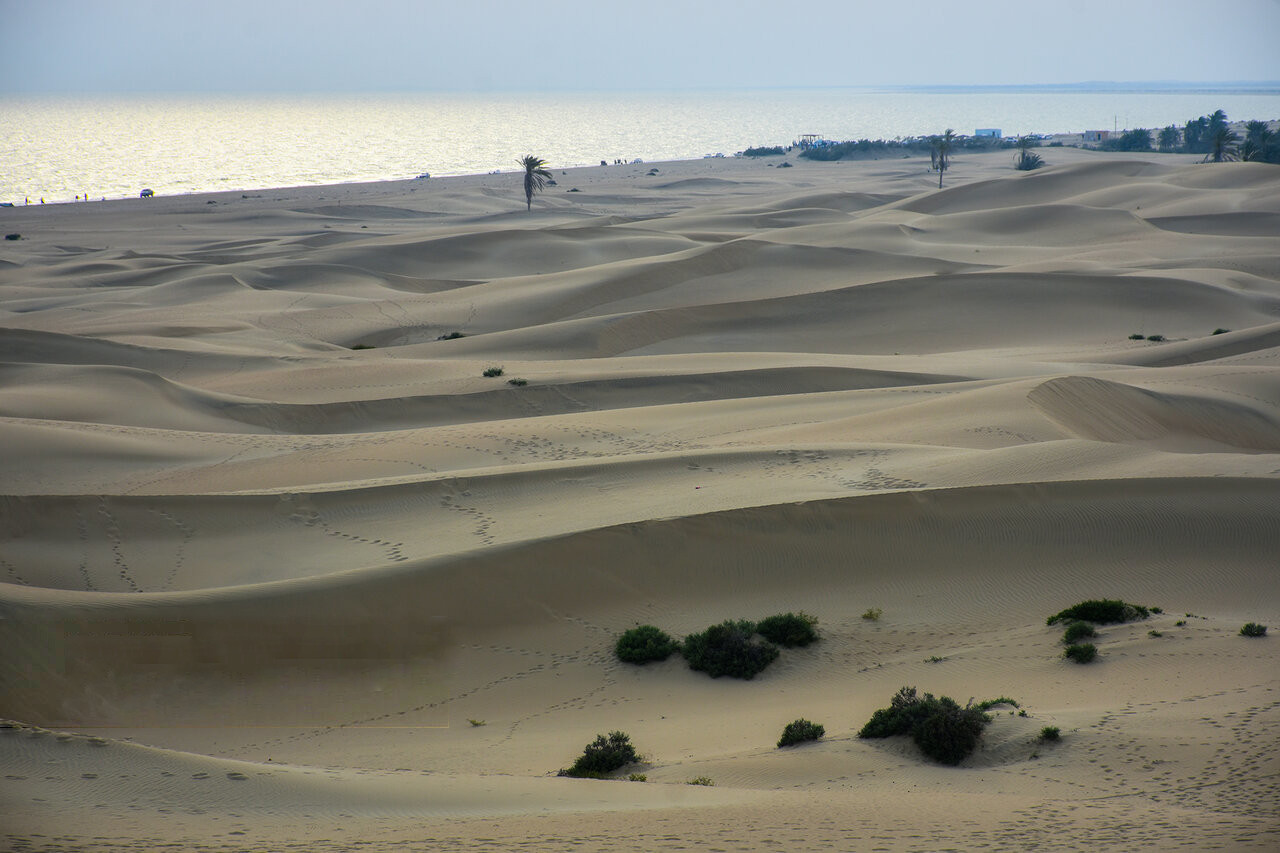

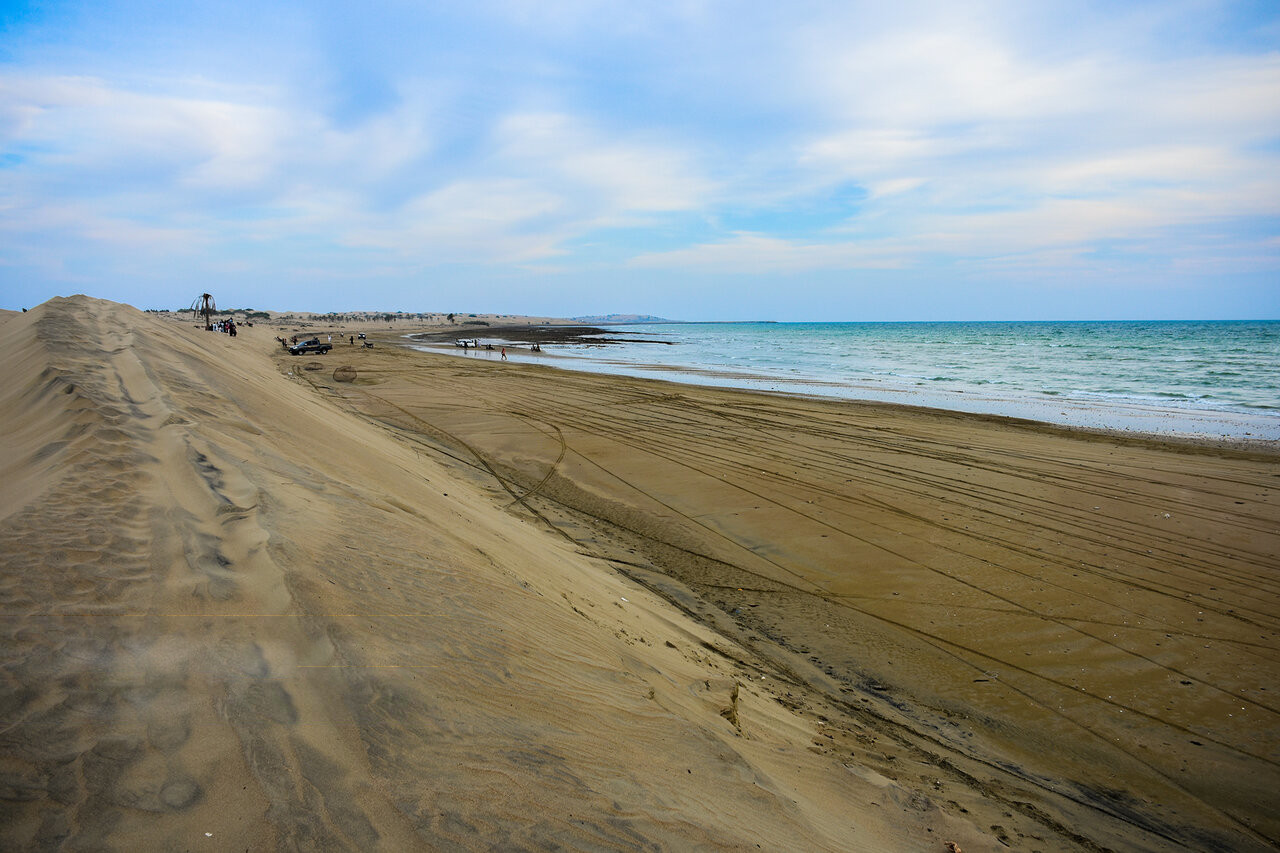

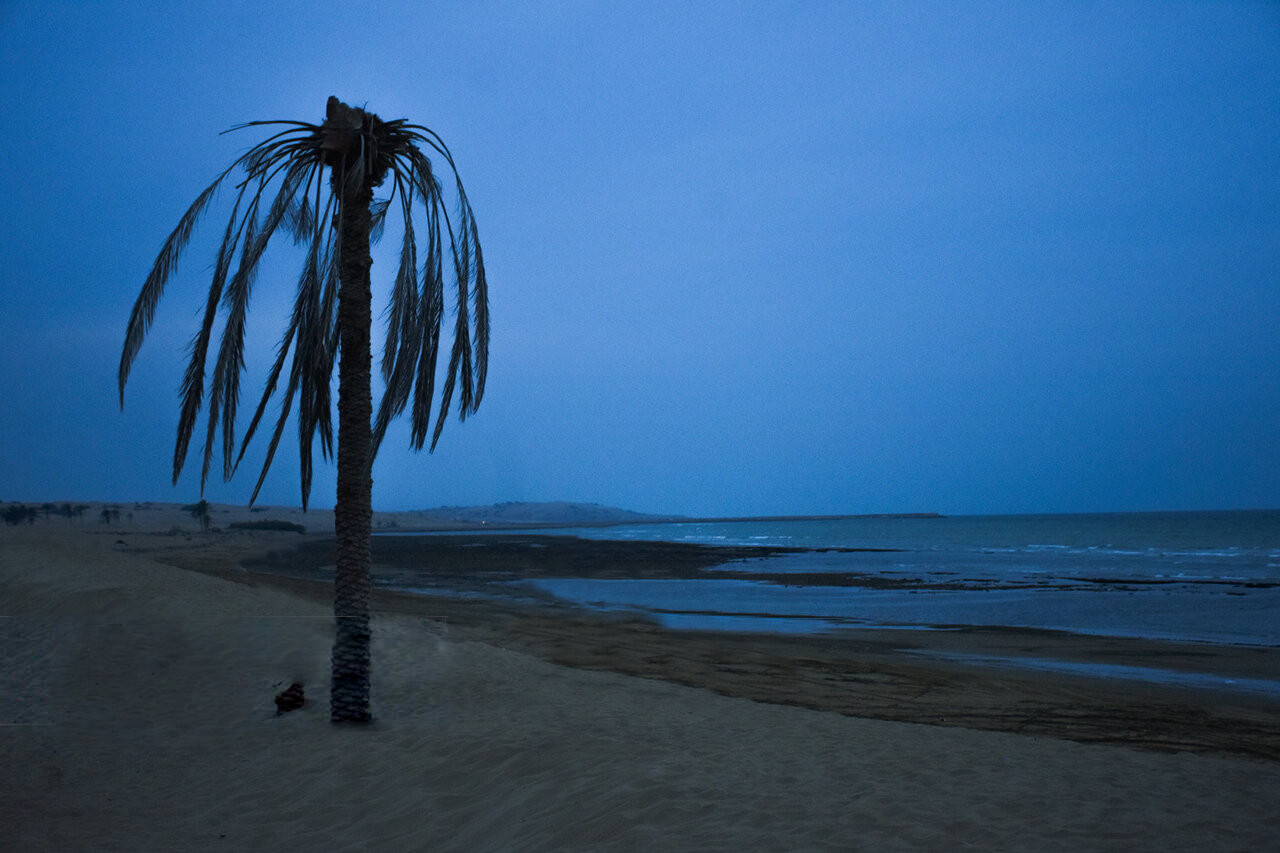

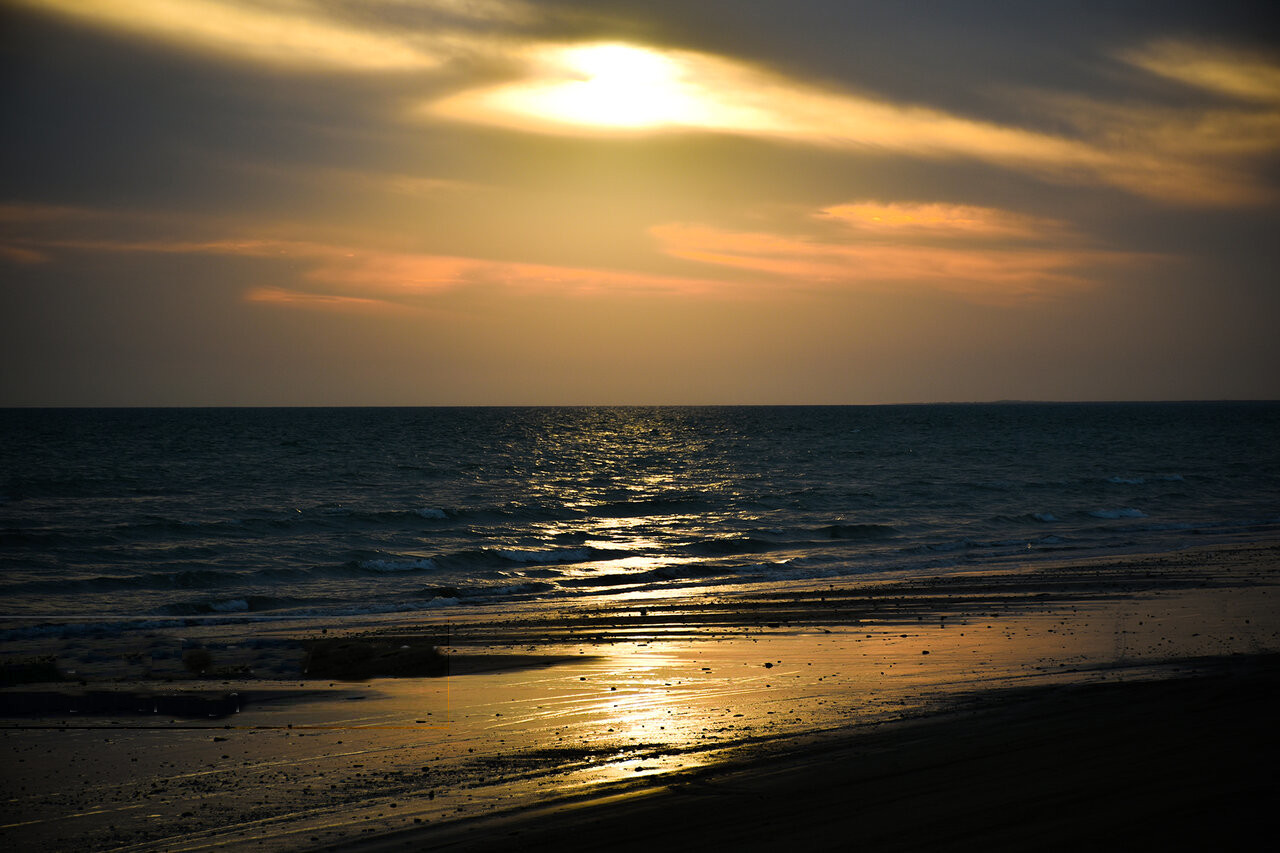
