= Esmail Chat Rural District =

Rural district in Sistan and Baluchestan province, Iran

Esmail Chat Rural District Persian: دهستان اسماعیل‌چات
- Rural District
- Location within Iran
- Coordinates: 25°36′47″N 59°31′42″E
- Country: Iran
- Province: Sistan and Baluchestan
- County: Zarabad
- District: Central
- Capital: Esmail Chat
- Time zone: UTC+3:30 (IRST)

Esmail Chat Rural District (Persian: دهستان اسماعیل‌چات) is in the Central District (Note: Formerly Zarabad District of Konarak County) of Zarabad County, Sistan and Baluchestan province, Iran. Its capital is the village of Esmail Chat, whose population at the time of the 2016 National Census was 831 people in 189 households.

== History ==
After the 2016 census, Zarabad District (Note: Renamed the Central District of Zarabad County) was separated from Konarak County in the establishment of Zarabad County, and Esmail Chat Rural District was created in the new Central District.
