= Zarabad, Minab =

Zarabad زراباد
- Village
- Location within Iran
- Coordinates: 26°19′26″N 57°14′15″E
- Country: Iran
- Province: Hormozgan
- County: Minab
- Bakhsh: Byaban
- Rural District: Byaban

Population (2006)
  - Total: 223
- Time zone: UTC+3:30 (IRST)
  - Summer (DST): UTC+4:30 (IRDT)

Zarabad (Persian: زراباد, also Romanized as Zarābād) is a village in Byaban Rural District, Byaban District, Minab County, Hormozgan Province, Iran. At the 2006 census, its population was 223, in 39 families.
