= Mount Derak =

Sedimentary rock mountain in Iran

Mount Derock
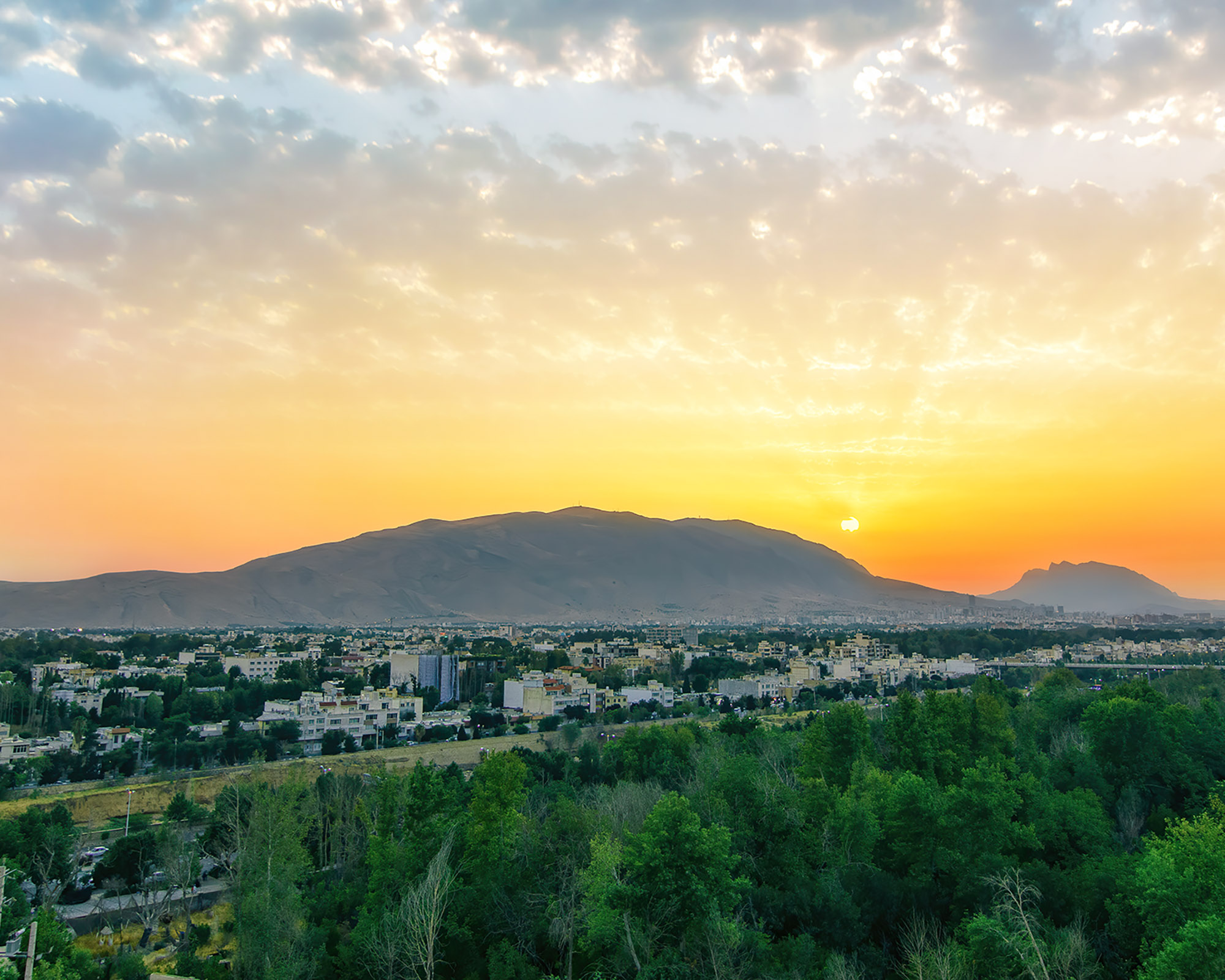
- View of Drak Mountain located in Shiraz, Iran

Highest point
- Elevation: 9,514 ft (2,900 m)
- Prominence: 4,605 ft (1,404 m)
- Coordinates: 29°41′02″N 52°24′14″E

Geography
- Location: Shiraz, Iran
- Parent range: Zagros Mountains
- Topo map: Mount Derak

Geology
- Rock age: < 40,000 yrs
- Mountain type: Sedimentary rock

Climbing
- First ascent: 1841
- Easiest route: Hike via south western zone

Mount Derak (also known as Kuh-eh Barfee or Mother Mount) is a sedimentary rock mountain in Shiraz, Fars, in the Middle East region in Iran. It is located west and northwest of Shiraz, Fars. It is called mother mountain because its shape resembles a pregnant woman lying on her back and the name barfi mountain refers to it usually being white-capped in winter, barf meaning snow in Persian.

Geologically, Shiraz is a syncline valley city (NW–SE elongated) that formed between the Baba Kohi and Derak anticlines.

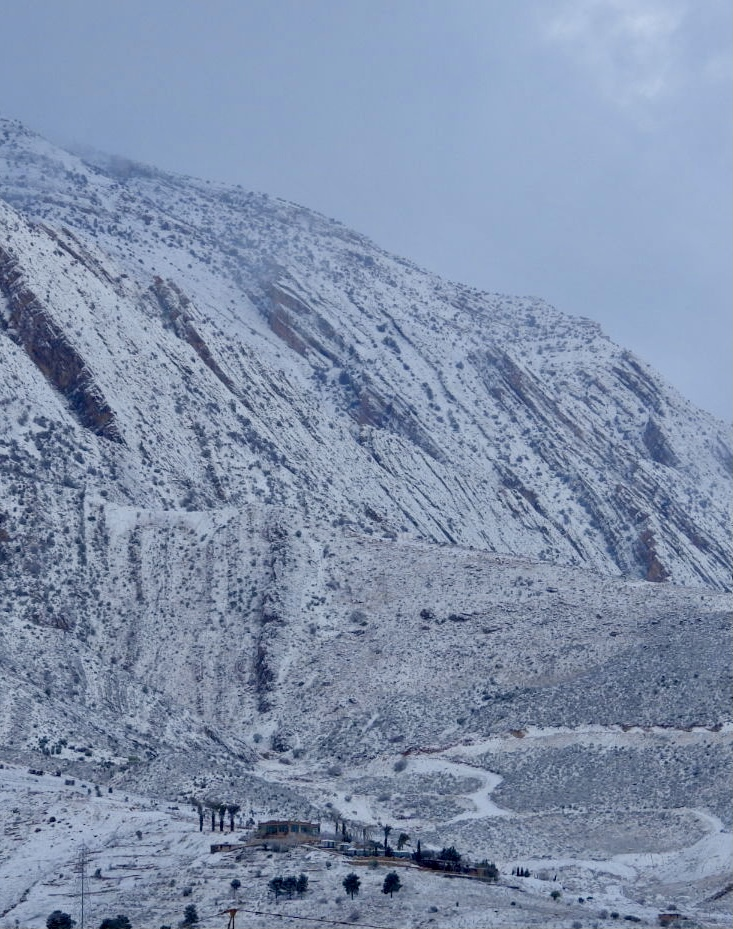
Mount Derak view from Shiraz in winter

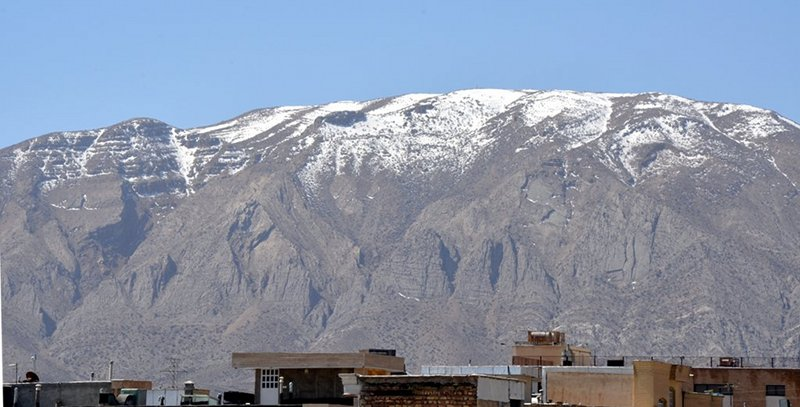
Snowy Mount Derak

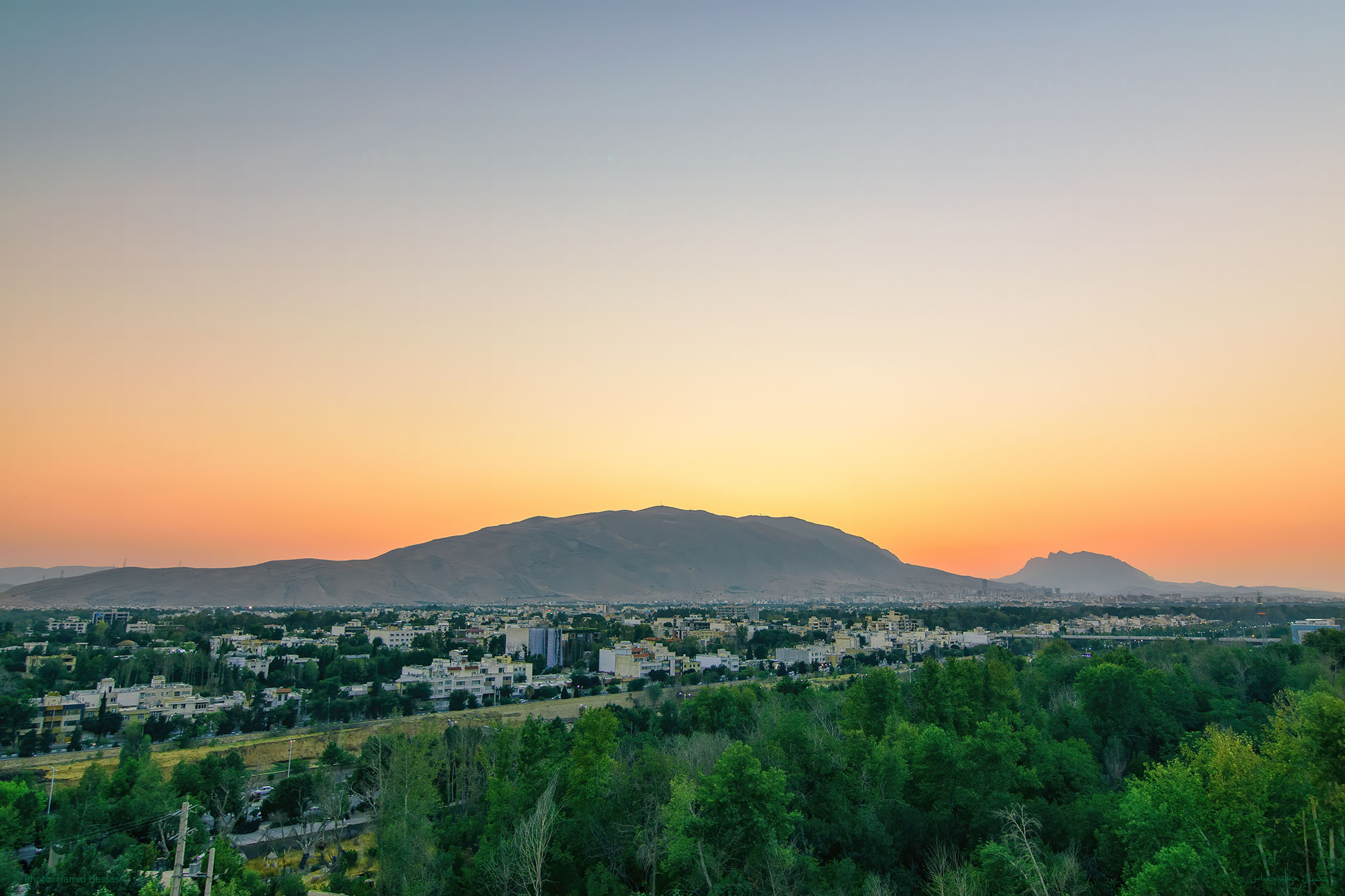
View of Mount Derak from Shiraz in winter

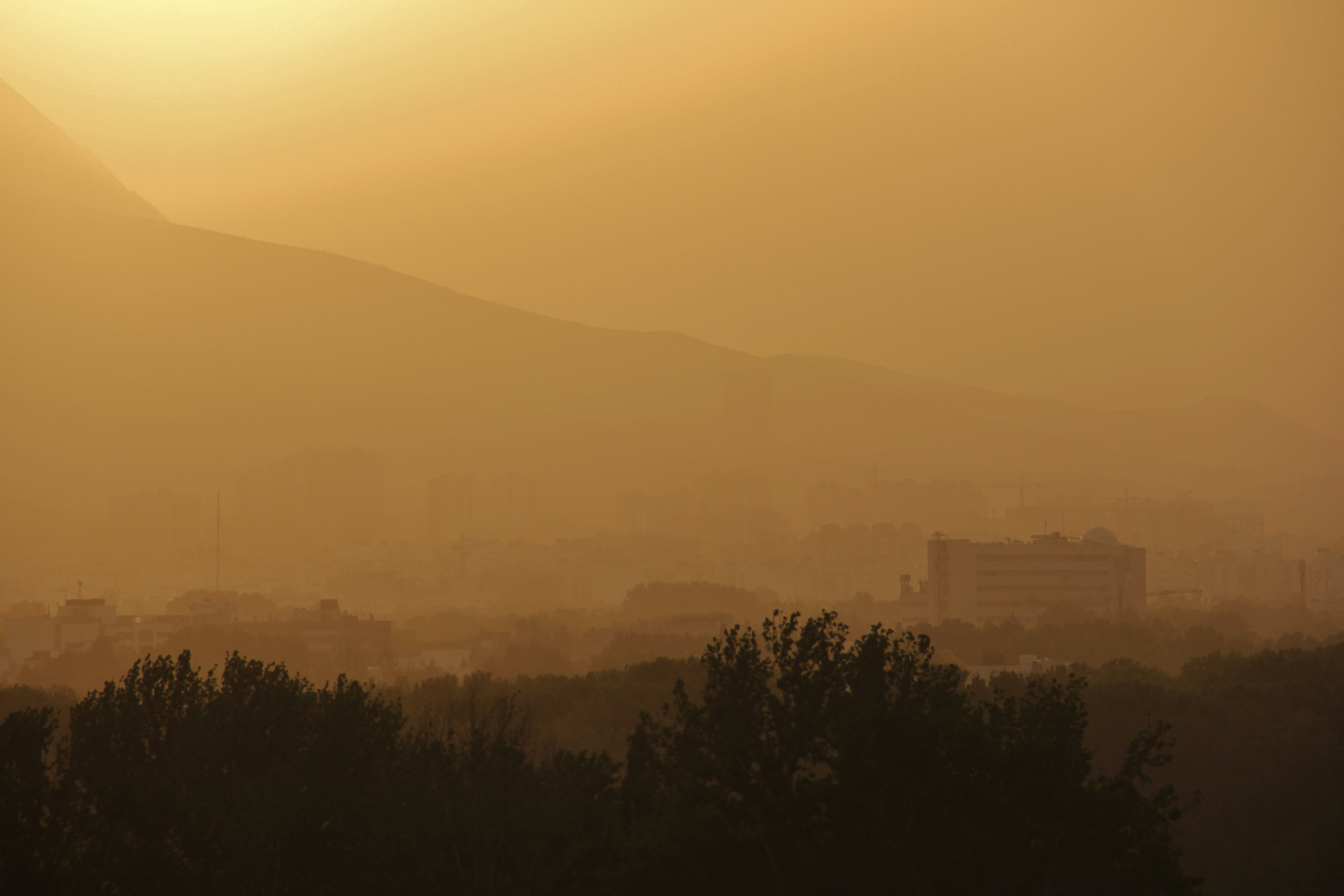
Sunset in Shiraz viewing north-west – Kowsar hospital is visible in the bottom right

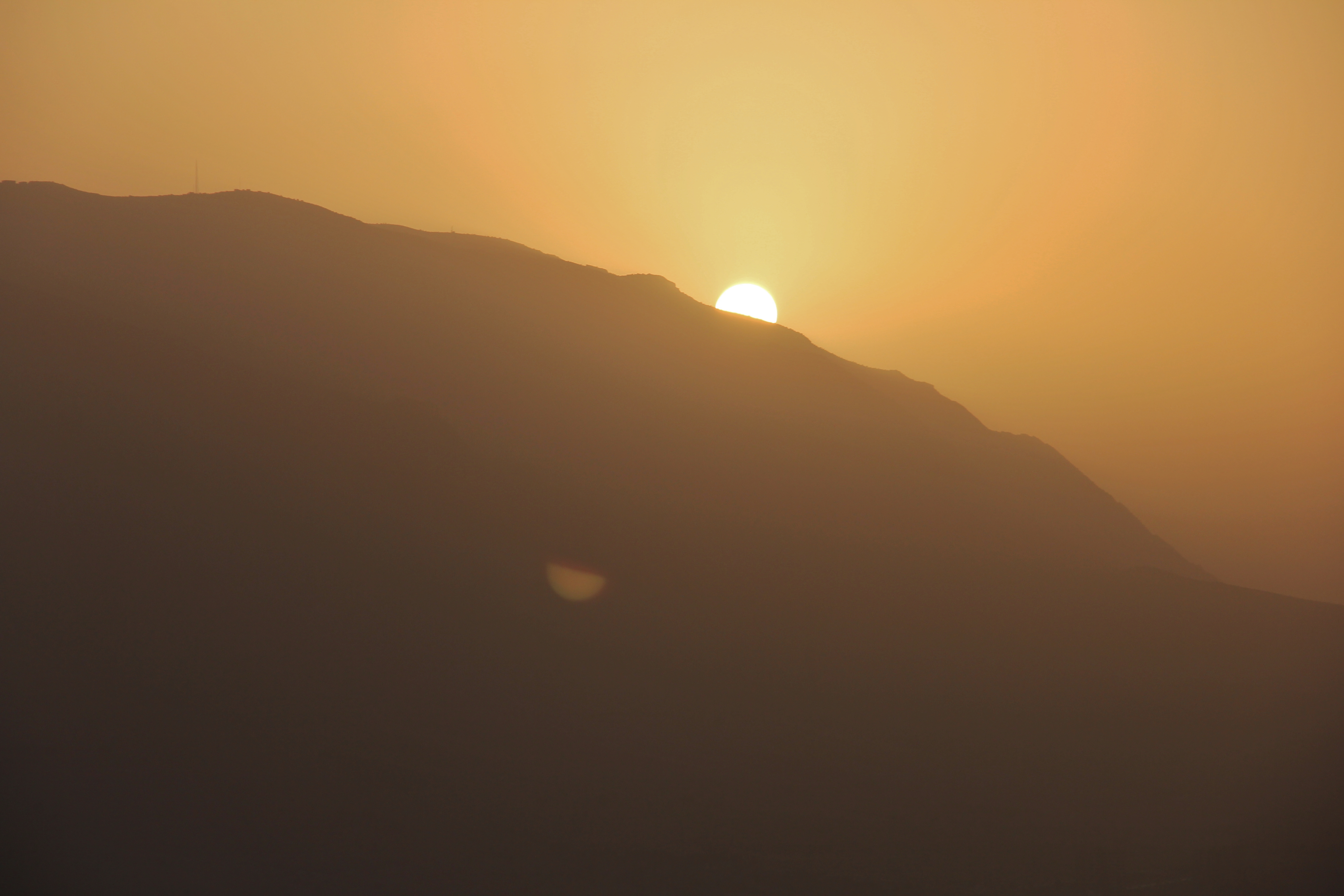
Golden hour in Shiraz viewing Mt. Derak

Local residents near Mount Derak believe the antennae atop the mountain are all or in part used to block satellite internet to residents of Iran. The belief stems from the fact that after the mountaintop was bombed in March of 2026, blocked satellite internet was restored. The mountaintop of Mount Derek was again bombed by the United States Air Force on July 20, 2026.
