= Helen Elliott Bandini =

American writer (born 1854–1911)

- Born: June 1854; Indianapolis, Indiana, U.S.
- Died: June 10, 1911 (age 56-57); Pasadena, California, U.S.
- Occupation(s): Author, journalist
- Spouse: Arturo Bandini
- Children: 2

Helen Elliott Bandini (June 1854 – June 10, 1911) was an American writer, primarily of Californian history. Bandini was active in civic matters, the arts and a writer for newspapers and magazines. She authored two books.

== Biography ==
Helen Elliott was born in Indianapolis and educated in public schools. She came to California in 1874 following her father, Dr. Thomas B. Elliott, who was an early founder and president of Indiana Colony. The name lasted for a while until which point they wanted their own post office. Up to this time, the mail was being brought up from Los Angeles by one resident's son who was going to school there.

Mail for the colony came to Los Angeles earmarked for "Indiana Colony," but when the community applied for a post office, the Postmaster General rejected the name Indiana Colony. Thus began the search for a new name for the town which would end up being Pasadena.

In 1883, she married Arturo Bandini (1853–1913), son of Juan Bandini and Refugio Argüello. They had two children. Her husband was a scholar and authored several books, including Navidad, a description of Christmas in Old California.

Bandini was active in civic matters, the arts and a writer for newspapers and magazines. She authored two books. One book titled, History of California, was originally published in 1908.

Although the book was written for younger readers, reviewers recommended it to readers of all ages. Pacific Short Story Club Magazine, described the book, saying, '"The work mingles enough of early California romance with the fact to make it read like story, yet gives clear ideas of the founding and growth of the State."' Her other book, a fictional story, titled, Chumash Courage: A story of California Indians before 1492," was also written for a juvenile audience.

Bandini died on June 10, 1911, in Pasadena, California, in the home that her husband had built in 1903.
