= Darak, Khuzestan =

Derak دارك
- Village
- Location within Iran
- Coordinates: 32°39′18″N 48°34′18″E
- Country: Iran
- Province: Khuzestan
- County: dezful
- Bakhsh: Sardasht
- Rural District: Shahi

Population (2006)
  - Total: 128
- Time zone: UTC+3:30 (IRST)
  - Summer (DST): UTC+4:30 (IRDT)

Derak (Persian: دارك, also Romanized as Derāk and Dārak) is a village in Shahi Rural District, Sardasht District, dezful County, Khuzestan Province, Iran. At the 2006 census, its population was 128, in 18 families.
