= Karvan District (Zarabad County) =

District in Sistan and Baluchestan province, Iran

Karvan District Persian: بخش کاروان
- District
- Location within Iran
- Coordinates: 25°42′46″N 59°23′00″E
- Country: Iran
- Province: Sistan and Baluchestan
- County: Zarabad
- Capital: Suru
- Time zone: UTC+3:30 (IRST)

Karvan District (Persian: بخش کاروان) is in Zarabad County, Sistan and Baluchestan province, Iran. Its capital is the village of Suru, whose population at the time of the 2016 National Census was 1,372 in 381 households.

== History ==
After the census, Zarabad District (Note: Renamed the Central District of Zarabad County) was separated from Konarak County in the establishment of Zarabad County, which was divided into two districts of two rural districts each, with Zarabad (Note: Formerly the village of Jahelu) as its capital and only city.

== Demographics ==
=== Administrative divisions ===
Karvan District
Administrative Divisions
Tanbalan RD
Zarabad-e Gharbi RD (Note: Formerly Zarabad Rural District)
RD = Rural District
