= Zarabad, Bashagard =

Zarabad زرآباد
- Village
- Location within Iran
- Coordinates: 26°19′24″N 57°14′19″E
- Country: Iran
- Province: Hormozgan
- County: Bashagard
- Bakhsh: Central
- Rural District: Jakdan

Population (2006)
  - Total: 163
- Time zone: UTC+3:30 (IRST)
  - Summer (DST): UTC+4:30 (IRDT)

Zarabad (Persian: زرآباد, also Romanized as Zarābād; also known as Zarādād) is a village in Jakdan Rural District, in the Central District of Bashagard County, Hormozgan Province, Iran. At the 2006 census, its population was 163, in 40 families.
