= Zarabad, Sistan and Baluchestan =

City in Sistan and Baluchestan province, Iran

Zarabad Persian: زرآباد
- City
- Location within Iran
- Coordinates: 25°35′47″N 59°24′15″E
- Country: Iran
- Province: Sistan and Baluchestan
- County: Zarabad
- District: Central

Population (2016)
  - Total: 4,003
- Time zone: UTC+3:30 (IRST)

Zarabad (Persian: زرآباد) (Note: Formerly the village of Jahelu (جهلو)) is a city in the Central District (Note: Formerly Zarabad District of Konarak County) of Zarabad County, Sistan and Baluchestan province, Iran, serving as capital of both the county and the district. It is also the administrative center for Zarabad-e Sharqi Rural District.

== Demographics ==
=== Population ===
At the time of the 2006 National Census, the population was 1,133 in 241 households, when it was the village of Jahelu in Zarabad-e Sharqi Rural District of Zarabad District (Note: Renamed the Central District of Zarabad County) in Konarak County. The following census in 2011 counted 3,222 people in 711 households, by which time the village had merged with the village of Zarabad and was elevated to city status as Zarabad. The 2016 census measured the population as 4,003 people in 876 households.

After the census, the district was separated from the county in the establishment of Zarabad County and renamed the Central District, with Zarabad as the new county's capital.
