= Zharabad, Dul =

Zharabad ژاراباد
- Village
- Location within Iran
- Coordinates: 37°13′27″N 45°17′11″E
- Country: Iran
- Province: West Azerbaijan
- County: Urmia
- Bakhsh: Central
- Rural District: Dul

Population (2006)
  - Total: 342
- Time zone: UTC+3:30 (IRST)
  - Summer (DST): UTC+4:30 (IRDT)

Zharabad (Persian: ژاراباد, also Romanized as Zhārābād; also known as Zārābād) is a village in Dul Rural District, in the Central District of Urmia County, West Azerbaijan Province, Iran. At the 2006 census, its population was 342, in 64 families.
