= Darak, Qazvin =

Darg درگ
- Village
- Location within Iran
- Coordinates: 36°24′14″N 50°17′41″E
- Country: Iran
- Province: Qazvin
- County: Qazvin
- Bakhsh: Alamut-e Gharbi
- Rural District: Rudbar-e Mohammad-e Zamani

Population (2006)
  - Total: 33
- Time zone: UTC+3:30 (IRST)
  - Summer (DST): UTC+4:30 (IRDT)

Darg (Persian: درگ; also known as Darg) is a village in Rudbar-e Mohammad-e Zamani Rural District, Alamout-e Gharbi District, Qazvin County, Qazvin Province, Iran. At the 2006 census, its population was 33, in 16 families.
