= Zarabad County =

County in Sistan and Baluchestan province, Iran

Zarabad County Persian: شهرستان زرآباد
- County
- Location of Zarabad County in Sistan and Baluchistan province (bottom left, pink)

- Location of Sistan and Baluchestan province in Iran
- Coordinates: 25°41′40″N 59°24′00″E
- Country: Iran
- Province: Sistan and Baluchestan
- Capital: Zarabad
- Districts: Central, Karvan
- Time zone: UTC+3:30 (IRST)

Zarabad County (Persian: شهرستان زرآباد) is in Sistan and Baluchestan province, Iran. Its capital is the city of Zarabad, (Note: Formerly the village of Jahelu) whose population at the time of the 2016 National Census was 4,003 in 876 households.

== History ==
After the 2016 census, Zarabad District (Note: Renamed the Central District of Zarabad County) was separated from Konarak County in the establishment of Zarabad County, which was divided into two districts of two rural districts each, with Zarabad as its capital and only city at the time.

== Demographics ==
=== Administrative divisions ===
Zarabad County's administrative structure is shown in the following table.

Zarabad County
Administrative Divisions
Central District (Note: Formerly Zarabad District of Konarak County)
Esmail Chat RD
Zarabad-e Sharqi RD
Zarabad (city)
Karvan District
Tanbalan RD
Zarabad-e Gharbi RD (Note: Formerly Zarabad Rural District)
RD = Rural District

== See also ==
Media related to Zarabad County at Wikimedia Commons
