= Zarabad-e Gharbi Rural District =

Rural district in Sistan and Baluchestan province, Iran

Zarabad-e Gharbi Rural District Persian: دهستان زرآباد غربي
- Rural District
- Location within Iran
- Coordinates: 25°35′29″N 59°18′04″E
- Country: Iran
- Province: Sistan and Baluchestan
- County: Zarabad
- District: Karvan
- Capital: Eslamabad-e Lash

Population (2016)
  - Total: 8,983
- Time zone: UTC+3:30 (IRST)

Zarabad-e Gharbi Rural District (Persian: دهستان زرآباد غربي) (Note: Formerly Zarabad Rural District (دهستان زرآباد)) is in Karvan District of Zarabad County, Sistan and Baluchestan province, Iran. Its capital is the village of Eslamabad-e Lash. (Note: Also known as Lash)

== Demographics ==
=== Population ===
At the time of the 2006 National Census, the rural district's population (as a part of Zarabad District (Note: Renamed the Central District of Zarabad County) in Konarak County) was 8,997 in 1,998 households. There were 8,614 inhabitants in 2,161 households at the following census of 2011. The 2016 census measured the population of the rural district as 8,983 in 2,407 households. The most populous of its 50 villages was Suru, with 1,372 people.

After the census, the district was separated from the county in the establishment of Zarabad County and renamed the Central District. The rural district was transferred to the new Karvan District.
