= Zarabad-e Sharqi Rural District =

Rural district in Sistan and Baluchestan province, Iran

Zarabad-e Sharqi Rural District Persian: دهستان زرآباد شرقي
- Rural District
- Location within Iran
- Coordinates: 25°30′01″N 59°31′31″E
- Country: Iran
- Province: Sistan and Baluchestan
- County: Zarabad
- District: Central
- Capital: Zarabad

Population (2016)
  - Total: 7,211
- Time zone: UTC+3:30 (IRST)

Zarabad-e Sharqi Rural District (Persian: دهستان زرآباد شرقي) is in the Central District (Note: Formerly Zarabad District of Konarak County) of Zarabad County, Sistan and Baluchestan province, Iran. It is administered from the city of Zarabad. (Note: Formerly the village of Jahelu)

== Demographics ==
=== Population ===
At the time of the 2006 National Census, the rural district's population (as a part of Zarabad District (Note: Renamed the Central District in Zarabad County) of Konarak County) was 6,495 in 1,362 households. There were 5,691 inhabitants in 1,297 households at the following census of 2011. The 2016 census measured the population of the rural district as 7,211 in 1,780 households. The most populous of its 37 villages was Esmail Chat, with 831 people.

After the census, the district was separated from the county in the establishment of Zarabad County and renamed the Central District.

== See also ==
Darak, a village in the rural district
