= Central District (Zarabad County) =

District in Sistan and Baluchestan province, Iran

Central District (Zarabad County) Persian: بخش مرکزی شهرستان زرآباد
- District
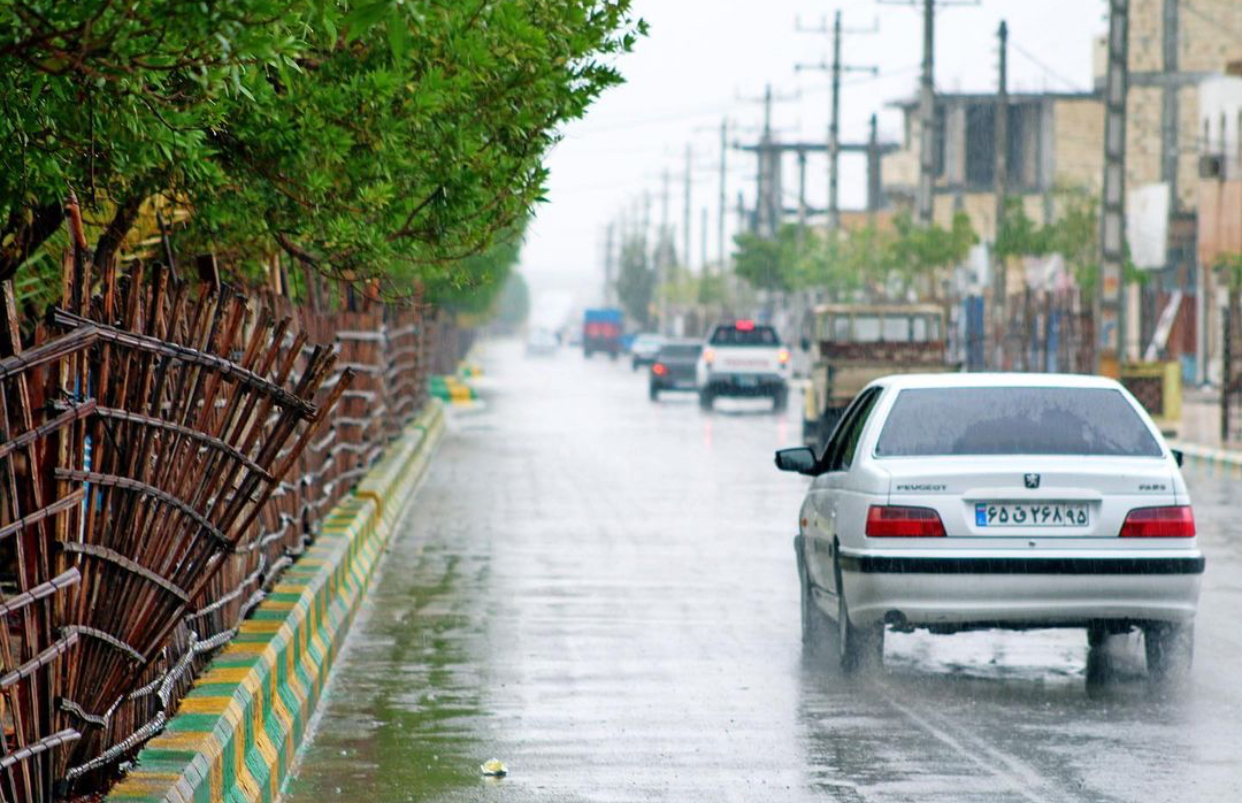
- Street in the Central District

- Location within Iran
- Coordinates: 25°33′37″N 59°31′55″E
- Country: Iran
- Province: Sistan and Baluchestan
- County: Zarabad
- Capital: Zarabad

Population (2016)
  - Total: 20,197 (Note: As Zarabad District of Konarak County)
- Time zone: UTC+3:30 (IRST)

The Central District of Zarabad County (Persian: بخش مرکزی شهرستان زرآباد) (Note: Formerly Zarabad District (بخش زرآباد) of Konarak County) is in Sistan and Baluchestan province, Iran. Its capital is the city of Zarabad. (Note: Formerly the village of Jahelu)

== History ==
After the 2016 census, Zarabad District was separated from Konarak County in the establishment of Zarabad County and renamed the Central District. The new county was divided into two districts of two rural districts each, with Zarabad as its capital and only city.

== Demographics ==
=== Population ===
At the time of the 2006 National Census, the district's population (as Zarabad District of Konarak County) was 15,492 in 3,360 households. The following census in 2011 counted 17,527 people in 4,169 households. The 2016 census measured the population of the district as 20,197 inhabitants in 5,063 households.

=== Administrative divisions ===
Central District (Zarabad County) Population (Note: As Zarabad District of Konarak County at the 2006, 2011, and 2016 censuses)
Administrative Divisions	2006	2011	2016
Esmail Chat RD (Note: Established after the 2016 census)			
Zarabad-e Gharbi RD (Note: Formerly Zarabad Rural District; transferred to Karvan District)	8,997	8,614	8,983
Zarabad-e Sharqi RD	6,495	5,691	7,211
Zarabad (city)		3,222	4,003
Total	15,492	17,527	20,197
RD = Rural District
