= Mashkand =

Village in Sistan and Baluchestan province, Iran

Mashkand Persian: مشکونت
- Village
- Location within Iran
- Coordinates: 26°35′23″N 60°48′52″E
- Country: Iran
- Province: Sistan and Baluchestan
- County: Nik Shahr
- District: Ahuran
- Rural District: Kahiri

Population (2016)
  - Total: 316
- Time zone: UTC+3:30 (IRST)

Mashkand (Persian: مشکونت) is a village in Kahiri Rural District of Ahuran District, Nik Shahr County, Sistan and Baluchestan province, Iran.

== Demographics ==
=== Population ===
At the time of the 2006 National Census, the village's population was 436 in 105 households, when it was in Chanef Rural District of Lashar District. (Note: Renamed the Central District of Lashar County) The following census in 2011 counted 286 people in 68 households. The 2016 census measured the population of the village as 316 people in 78 households, by which time the rural district had been separated from the district in the formation of Ahuran District. Mashkand was transferred to Kahiri Rural District created in the new district. It was the most populous village in its rural district.
