= Mohtaramabad =

Village in Sistan and Baluchestan province, Iran

Mohtaramabad Persian: محترم‌آباد
- Village
- Location within Iran
- Coordinates: 26°42′24″N 59°14′47″E
- Country: Iran
- Province: Sistan and Baluchestan
- County: Fanuj
- District: Kotij
- Rural District: Mohtaramabad

Population (2016)
  - Total: 2,663
- Time zone: UTC+3:30 (IRST)

Mohtaramabad (Persian: محترم‌آباد) is a village in, and the capital of, Mohtaramabad Rural District of Kotij District, Fanuj County, Sistan and Baluchestan province, Iran.

== Demographics ==
=== Population ===
At the time of the 2006 National Census, the village's population was 2,098 in 460 households, when it was in Kotij Rural District of the former Fanuj District of Nik Shahr County. The following census in 2011 counted 2,564 people in 632 households. The 2016 census measured the population of the village as 2,663 people in 715 households, by which time the district had been separated from the county in the establishment of Fanuj County. The rural district was transferred to the new Kotij District, and Mohtaramabad was transferred to Mohtaramabad Rural District created in the district. It was the most populous village in its rural district.
