= Kupch =

Village in Sistan and Baluchestan province, Iran

Kupch Persian: کوپچ
- Village
- Location within Iran
- Coordinates: 26°38′59″N 60°10′51″E
- Country: Iran
- Province: Sistan and Baluchestan
- County: Lashar
- District: Pip
- Rural District: Lashar-e Jonubi

Population (2016)
  - Total: 1,757
- Time zone: UTC+3:30 (IRST)

Kupch (Persian: کوپچ) is a village in, and the capital of, Lashar-e Jonubi Rural District of Pip District, Lashar County, Sistan and Baluchestan province, Iran. The previous capital of the rural district was the village of Pip.

== Demographics ==
=== Population ===
At the time of the 2006 National Census, the village's population was 1,309 in 283 households, when it was in Lashar District (Note: Renamed the Central District of Lashar County) of Nik Shahr County. The following census in 2011 counted 1,609 people in 389 households. The 2016 census measured the population of the village as 1,757 people in 514 households.

After the census, the district was separated from the county in the establishment of Lashar County and renamed the Central District. The rural district was transferred to the new Pip District.
