= Maskutan =

Village in Sistan and Baluchestan province, Iran

Maskutan Persian: مسکوتان
- Village
- Location within Iran
- Coordinates: 26°50′12″N 59°48′55″E
- Country: Iran
- Province: Sistan and Baluchestan
- County: Fanuj
- District: Central
- Rural District: Maskutan

Population (2016)
  - Total: 4,282
- Time zone: UTC+3:30 (IRST)

Maskutan (Persian: مسکوتان) is a village in, and the capital of, Maskutan Rural District of the Central District of Fanuj County, Sistan and Baluchestan province, Iran.

== Demographics ==
=== Population ===
At the time of the 2006 National Census, the village's population was 3,656 in 767 households, when it was in the former Fanuj District of Nik Shahr County. The following census in 2011 counted 4,112 people in 994 households. The 2016 census measured the population of the village as 4,282 people in 1,108 households, by which time the district had been separated from the county in the establishment of Fanuj County. The rural district was transferred to the new Central District. It was the most populous village in its rural district.
