= Zirbandad =

Village in Sistan and Baluchestan province, Iran

Zirbandad Persian: زیربانداد
- Village
- Location within Iran
- Coordinates: 26°49′39″N 60°04′54″E
- Country: Iran
- Province: Sistan and Baluchestan
- County: Lashar
- District: Central
- Rural District: Zirbandad

Population (2016)
  - Total: 1,158
- Time zone: UTC+3:30 (IRST)

Zirbandad (Persian: زیربانداد) is a village in, and the capital of, Zirbandad Rural District of the Central District (Note: Formerly Lashar District of Nik Shahr County) of Lashar County, Sistan and Baluchestan province, Iran.

== Demographics ==
=== Population ===
At the time of the 2006 National Census, the village's population was 775 in 162 households, when it was in Lashar-e Shomali Rural District of Lashar District (Note: Renamed the Central District of Lashar County) in Nik Shahr County. The following census in 2011 counted 948 people in 235 households. The 2016 census measured the population of the village as 1,158 people in 264 households.

After the census, the district was separated from the county in the establishment of Lashar County and renamed the Central District. Zirbandar was transferred to Zirbandar Rural District created in the district.
