= Tang-e Sarheh =

Village in Sistan and Baluchestan province, Iran

Tang-e Sarheh Persian: تنگ سرحه
- Village
- Location within Iran
- Coordinates: 26°33′03″N 59°56′00″E
- Country: Iran
- Province: Sistan and Baluchestan
- County: Lashar
- District: Pip
- Rural District: Tang-e Sarheh

Population (2016)
  - Total: 1,789
- Time zone: UTC+3:30 (IRST)

Tang-e Sarheh (Persian: تنگ سرحه) is a village in, and the capital of, Tang-e Sarheh Rural District of Pip District, Lashar County, Sistan and Baluchestan province, Iran.

== Demographics ==
=== Population ===
At the time of the 2006 National Census, the village's population was 1,165 in 274 households, when it was in Lashar-e Jonubi Rural District of Lashar District (Note: Renamed the Central District of Lashar County) in Nik Shahr County. The following census in 2011 counted 1,029 people in 265 households. The 2016 census measured the population of the village as 1,789 people in 465 households. It was the most populous village of its rural district.

After the census, the district was separated from the county in the establishment of Lashar County and renamed the Central District. The rural district was transferred to the new Pip District, and Tang-e Sarheh was transferred to Tang-e Sarheh Rural District created in the district.
