= Kahiri, Nik Shahr =

Village in Sistan and Baluchestan province, Iran

Kahiri Persian: کهیری
- Village
- Location within Iran
- Coordinates: 26°33′50″N 60°42′57″E
- Country: Iran
- Province: Sistan and Baluchestan
- County: Nik Shahr
- District: Ahuran
- Rural District: Kahiri

Population (2016)
  - Total: 227
- Time zone: UTC+3:30 (IRST)

Kahiri (Persian: کهیری) is a village in, and the capital of, Kahiri Rural District of Ahuran District, Nik Shahr County, Sistan and Baluchestan province, Iran.

== Demographics ==
=== Population ===
At the time of the 2006 National Census, the village's population was 62 in 18 households, when it was in Chanef Rural District of Lashar District. (Note: Renamed the Central District of Lashar County) The following census in 2011 counted 90 people in 30 households. The 2016 census measured the population of the village as 227 people in 68 households, by which time the rural district had been separated from the district in the establishment of Ahuran District. Kahiri was transferred to Kahiri Rural District created in the new district.
