= Seyfabad-e Javashiri =

Village in Sistan and Baluchestan province, Iran

Seyfabad-e Javashiri Persian: سیف‌آباد جاوشیری
- Village
- Location within Iran
- Coordinates: 26°52′16″N 60°13′49″E
- Country: Iran
- Province: Sistan and Baluchestan
- County: Lashar
- District: Central
- Rural District: Lashar-e Shomali

Population (2016)
  - Total: 1,759
- Time zone: UTC+3:30 (IRST)

Seyfabad-e Javashiri (Persian: سیف‌آباد جاوشیری) is a village in Lashar-e Shomali Rural District of the Central District (Note: Formerly Lashar District of Nik Shahr County) of Lashar County, Sistan and Baluchestan province, Iran.

== Demographics ==
=== Population ===
At the time of the 2006 National Census, the village's population was 1,276 in 278 households, when it was in Lashar District (Note: Renamed the Central District of Lashar County) of Nik Shahr County. The following census in 2011 counted 1,252 people in 323 households. The 2016 census measured the population of the village as 1,759 people in 478 households. It was the most populous village in its rural district.

After the census, the district was separated from the county in the establishment of Lashar County and renamed the Central District.
