= Ramak, Iran =

Village in Sistan and Baluchestan province, Iran

Ramak Persian: رامک
- Village
- Location within Iran
- Coordinates: 26°36′24″N 59°29′13″E
- Country: Iran
- Province: Sistan and Baluchestan
- County: Fanuj
- District: Central
- Rural District: Fanuj

Population (2016)
  - Total: 1,372
- Time zone: UTC+3:30 (IRST)

Ramak (Persian: رامک) is a village in Fanuj Rural District of the Central District of Fanuj County, Sistan and Baluchestan province, Iran.

== Demographics ==
=== Population ===
At the time of the 2006 National Census, the village's population was 1,038 in 249 households, when it was in the former Fanuj District of Nik Shahr County. The following census in 2011 counted 1,312 people in 307 households. The 2016 census measured the population of the village as 1,372 people in 362 households, by which time the district had been separated from the county in the establishment of Fanuj County. The rural district was transferred to the new Central District. It was the most populous village in its rural district.
