= Tutan =

Tutan (Persian: توتان) may refer to:

== Places ==
- Tutan, Kerman, village in Kerman province, Iran
- Tutan, Sistan and Baluchestan, is a village in Baluchistan, Iran
- Tutan and Mohammadan Rural District, Rural district in Sistan and Baluchestan province, Iran

== People ==
- Tutan Reyes, American football player (born 1977)
