= Pip, Sistan and Baluchestan =

Village in Sistan and Baluchestan province, Iran

Pip Persian: پیپ
- Village
- Location within Iran
- Coordinates: 26°37′33″N 60°07′15″E
- Country: Iran
- Province: Sistan and Baluchestan
- County: Lashar
- District: Pip
- Rural District: Lashar-e Jonubi

Population (2016)
  - Total: 1,550
- Time zone: UTC+3:30 (IRST)

Pip (Persian: پیپ) is a village in, and the former capital of, Lashar-e Jonubi Rural District of Pip District, Lashar County, Sistan and Baluchestan province, Iran, serving as capital of the district. The capital of the rural district has been transferred to the village of Kupch.

== Demographics ==
=== Population ===
At the time of the 2006 National Census, the city's population was 1,527 in 284 households, when it was in Lashar District (Note: Renamed the Central District of Lashar County) of Nik Shahr County. The following census in 2011 counted 1,594 people in 443 households. The 2016 census measured the population of the city as 1,550 people in 441 households.

After the census, the district was separated from the county in the establishment of Lashar County and renamed the Central District. The rural district was transferred to the new Pip District.
