= Mohtaramabad Rural District =

Rural district in Sistan and Baluchestan province, Iran

Mohtaramabad Rural District Persian: دهستان محترم آباد
- Rural District
- Location within Iran
- Coordinates: 26°42′49″N 59°17′42″E
- Country: Iran
- Province: Sistan and Baluchestan
- County: Fanuj
- District: Kotij
- Capital: Mohtaramabad

Population (2016)
  - Total: 5,913
- Time zone: UTC+3:30 (IRST)

Mohtaramabad Rural District (Persian: دهستان محترم آباد) is in Kotij District of Fanuj County, Sistan and Baluchestan province, Iran. Its capital is the village of Mohtaramabad.

== History ==
After the 2011 National Census, Fanuj District was separated from Nik Shahr County in the establishment of Fanuj County, and Mohtaramabad Rural District was created in the new Kotij District.

== Demographics ==
=== Population ===
At the time of the 2016 census, the rural district's population was 5,913 in 1,479 households. The most populous of its 78 villages was Mohtaramabad, with 2,663 people.
