= Maluran =

Village in Sistan and Baluchestan province, Iran

Maluran Persian: ملوران
- Village
- Location within Iran
- Coordinates: 26°18′05″N 59°48′16″E
- Country: Iran
- Province: Sistan and Baluchestan
- County: Nik Shahr
- District: Central
- Rural District: Chahan

Population (2016)
  - Total: 1,142
- Time zone: UTC+3:30 (IRST)

Maluran (Persian: ملوران) is a village in Chahan Rural District of the Central District of Nik Shahr County, Sistan and Baluchestan province, Iran.

== Demographics ==
=== Population ===
At the time of the 2006 National Census, the village's population was 807 in 128 households. The following census in 2011 counted 934 people in 225 households. The 2016 census measured the population of the village as 1,142 people in 376 households. It was the most populous village in its rural district.
