= Tang-e Sarheh Rural District =

Rural district in Sistan and Baluchestan province, Iran

Tang-e Sarheh Rural District Persian: دهستان تنگ سرحه
- Rural District
- Location within Iran
- Coordinates: 26°35′18″N 59°58′55″E
- Country: Iran
- Province: Sistan and Baluchestan
- County: Lashar
- District: Pip
- Capital: Tang-e Sarheh
- Time zone: UTC+3:30 (IRST)

Tang-e Sarheh Rural District (Persian: دهستان تنگ سرحه) is in Pip District of Lashar County, Sistan and Baluchestan province, Iran. Its capital is the village of Tang-e Sarheh, whose population at the time of the 2016 National Census was 1,789 in 465 households.

== History ==
After the 2016 census, Lashar District (Note: Renamed the Central District of Lashar County) was separated from Nik Shahr County in the establishment of Lashar County and renamed the Central District. Tang-e Sarheh Rural District was created in the new Pip District.
