= Chanef =

City in Sistan and Baluchestan province, Iran

Chanef Persian: چانف
- City
- Location within Iran
- Coordinates: 26°38′31″N 60°29′52″E
- Country: Iran
- Province: Sistan and Baluchestan
- County: Nik Shahr
- District: Ahuran

Population (2016)
  - Total: 2,297
- Time zone: UTC+3:30 (IRST)

Chanef (Persian: چانف) is a city in, and the capital of, Ahuran District of Nik Shahr County, Sistan and Baluchestan province, Iran. It also serves as the administrative center for Chanef Rural District.

== Demographics ==
=== Population ===
At the time of the 2006 National Census, Chanef's population was 1,692 in 389 households, when it was a village in Chanef Rural District of the former Lashar District. (Note: Renamed the Central District of Lashar County) The following census in 2011 counted 2,425 people in 535 households. The 2016 census measured the population of the village as 2,297 people in 606 households, by which time the rural district had been separated from the district in the formation of Ahuran District. It was the most populous village in its rural district.

After the census, the village of Chanef was elevated to the status of a city.
