= Kahiri =

Kahiri (Persian: كهيري) may refer to:

- Kahiri, Chabahar
- Kahiri, Nik Shahr, a village in Nik Shahr County, Sistan and Baluchestan province
- Kahiri Rural District, an administrative division of Nik Shahr County, Sistan and Baluchestan province

== See also ==
- Karihi
