= Dastgerd, Nik Shahr =

Village in Sistan and Baluchestan province, Iran

Dastgerd Persian: دستگرد
- Village
- Location within Iran
- Coordinates: 26°17′52″N 59°23′52″E
- Country: Iran
- Province: Sistan and Baluchestan
- County: Nik Shahr
- District: Bent
- Rural District: Dastgerd

Population (2016)
  - Total: 1,547
- Time zone: UTC+3:30 (IRST)

Dastgerd (Persian: دستگرد) is a village in, and the capital of, Dastgerd Rural District of Bent District, Nik Shahr County, Sistan and Baluchestan province, Iran.

== Demographics ==
=== Population ===
At the time of the 2006 National Census, the village's population was 972 in 192 households. The following census in 2011 counted 1,183 people in 299 households. The 2016 census measured the population of the village as 1,547 people in 410 households. It was the most populous village in its rural district.
