= Dask, Nik Shahr =

Village in Sistan and Baluchestan province, Iran

Dask Persian: دسک
- Village
- Location within Iran
- Coordinates: 26°22′56″N 59°32′56″E
- Country: Iran
- Province: Sistan and Baluchestan
- County: Nik Shahr
- District: Bent
- Rural District: Bent

Population (2016)
  - Total: 2,059
- Time zone: UTC+3:30 (IRST)

Dask (Persian: دسک) is a village in Bent Rural District of Bent District, Nik Shahr County, Sistan and Baluchestan province, Iran.

== Demographics ==
=== Population ===
At the time of the 2006 National Census, the village's population was 1,594 in 351 households. The following census in 2011 counted 1,322 people in 326 households. The 2016 census measured the population of the village as 2,059 people in 517 households. It was the most populous village in its rural district.
