= Hakran =

Village in Sistan and Baluchestan province, Iran

Hakran Persian: هاکران
- Village
- Country: Iran
- Province: Sistan and Baluchestan
- County: Nik Shahr
- District: Bent
- Rural District: Tutan and Mohammadan

Population (2016)
  - Total: 487
- Time zone: UTC+3:30 (IRST)

Hakran (Persian: هاکران) is a village in Tutan and Mohammadan Rural District of Bent District, Nik Shahr County, Sistan and Baluchestan province, Iran.

== Demographics ==
=== Population ===
At the time of the 2006 National Census, the village's population was 276 in 49 households. The following census in 2011 counted 330 people in 85 households. The 2016 census measured the population of the village as 487 people in 130 households. It was the most populous village in its rural district.
