= Darukan =

Village in Sistan and Baluchestan province, Iran

Darukan Persian: داروکان
- Village
- Location within Iran
- Coordinates: 26°24′38″N 60°19′21″E
- Country: Iran
- Province: Sistan and Baluchestan
- County: Nik Shahr
- District: Central
- Rural District: Mahban

Population (2016)
  - Total: 1,311
- Time zone: UTC+3:30 (IRST)

Darukan (Persian: داروکان) is a village in Mahban Rural District of the Central District of Nik Shahr County, Sistan and Baluchestan province, Iran.

== Demographics ==
=== Population ===
At the time of the 2006 National Census, the village's population was 902 in 221 households. The following census in 2011 counted 1,096 people in 270 households. The 2016 census measured the population of the village as 1,311 people in 336 households. It was the most populous village in its rural district.
