= Hichan =

Village in Sistan and Baluchestan province, Iran

Hichan Persian: هیچان
- Village
- Location within Iran
- Coordinates: 26°21′05″N 60°04′29″E
- Country: Iran
- Province: Sistan and Baluchestan
- County: Nik Shahr
- District: Central
- Rural District: Hichan

Population (2016)
  - Total: 2,905
- Time zone: UTC+3:30 (IRST)

Hichan (Persian: هیچان) is a village in, and the capital of, Hichan Rural District of the Central District of Nik Shahr County, Sistan and Baluchestan province, Iran.

== Demographics ==
=== Population ===
At the time of the 2006 National Census, the village's population was 2,054 in 451 households. The following census in 2011 counted 2,637 people in 703 households. The 2016 census measured the population of the village as 2,905 people in 776 households. It was the most populous village in its rural district.
