= Mokht =

Village in Sistan and Baluchestan province, Iran

Mokht Persian: مخت
- Village
- Location within Iran
- Coordinates: 26°08′48″N 60°06′23″E
- Country: Iran
- Province: Sistan and Baluchestan
- County: Nik Shahr
- District: Central
- Rural District: Mokht

Population (2016)
  - Total: 1,647
- Time zone: UTC+3:30 (IRST)

Mokht (Persian: مخت) is a village in, and the capital of, Mokht Rural District of the Central District of Nik Shahr County, Sistan and Baluchestan province, Iran.

== Demographics ==
=== Population ===
At the time of the 2006 National Census, the village's population was 1,289 in 263 households. The following census in 2011 counted 1,664 people in 362 households. The 2016 census measured the population of the village as 1,647 people in 413 households. It was the most populous village in its rural district.
