= Kotij, Iran =

City in Sistan and Baluchestan province, Iran

Kotij Persian: کتیج
- City
- Location within Iran
- Coordinates: 26°43′22″N 59°08′10″E
- Country: Iran
- Province: Sistan and Baluchestan
- County: Fanuj
- District: Kotij

Population (2016)
  - Total: 3,016
- Time zone: UTC+3:30 (IRST)

Kotij (Persian: کتیج) is a city in, and the capital of, Kotij District of Fanuj County, Sistan and Baluchestan province, Iran. It also serves as the administrative center for Kotij Rural District.

== Demographics ==
=== Population ===
At the time of the 2006 National Census, Kotij's population was 2,193 in 504 households, when it was a village in Kotij Rural District of the former Fanuj District of Nik Shahr County. The following census in 2011 counted 2,616 people in 670 households. The 2016 census measured the population of the village as 3,016 people in 819 households, by which time the district had been separated from the county in the establishment of Fanuj County. The rural district was transferred to the new Kotij District. It was the most populous village in its rural district.

After the census, Kotij was elevated to the status of a city.
