= Chahan, Nik Shahr =

Village in Sistan and Baluchestan province, Iran

Chahan Persian: چاهان
- Village
- Location within Iran
- Coordinates: 26°04′35″N 59°44′13″E
- Country: Iran
- Province: Sistan and Baluchestan
- County: Nik Shahr
- District: Central
- Rural District: Chahan

Population (2016)
  - Total: 727
- Time zone: UTC+3:30 (IRST)

Chahan (Persian: چاهان) is a village in, and the capital of, Chahan Rural District of the Central District of Nik Shahr County, Sistan and Baluchestan province, Iran.

== Demographics ==
=== Population ===
At the time of the 2006 National Census, the village's population was 977 in 201 households. The following census in 2011 counted 603 people in 142 households. The 2016 census measured the population of the village as 727 people in 170 households.
