= Kotij District =

District in Sistan and Baluchestan province, Iran

Kotij District Persian: بخش کتیج
- District
- Location within Iran
- Coordinates: 26°42′49″N 59°13′10″E
- Country: Iran
- Province: Sistan and Baluchestan
- County: Fanuj
- Capital: Kotij

Population (2016)
  - Total: 13,184
- Time zone: UTC+3:30 (IRST)

Kotij District (Persian: بخش کتیج) is in Fanuj County, Sistan and Baluchestan province, Iran. Its capital is the city of Kotij.

== History ==
After the 2011 National Census, Fanuj District was separated from Nik Shahr County in the establishment of Fanuj County, which was divided into two districts of two rural districts each, with Fanuj as its capital and only city at the time. After the 2016 census the village of Kotij was elevated to the status of a city.

== Demographics ==
=== Population ===
At the time of the 2016 census, the district's population was 13,184 inhabitants in 3,429 households.

=== Administrative divisions ===
Kotij District Population
Administrative Divisions	2016
Kotij RD	7,271
Mohtaramabad RD	5,913
Kotij (city) (Note: Became a city after establishment of the county)	
Total	13,184
RD = Rural District
