= Konardan, Nik Shahr =

Village in Sistan and Baluchestan province, Iran

Konardan Persian: كناردان
- Village
- Location within Iran
- Coordinates: 26°20′33″N 60°10′29″E
- Country: Iran
- Province: Sistan and Baluchestan
- County: Nik Shahr
- District: Central
- Rural District: Hichan

Population (2016)
  - Total: 345
- Time zone: UTC+3:30 (IRST)

Konardan (Persian: كناردان) is a village in Hichan Rural District of the Central District of Nik Shahr County, Sistan and Baluchestan province, Iran.

== Demographics ==
=== Population ===
At the time of the 2006 National Census, the village's population was 362 in 43 households. The following census in 2011 counted 364 people in 73 households. The 2016 census measured the population of the village as 345 people in 68 households.
