= Kahiri Rural District =

Rural district in Sistan and Baluchestan province, Iran

Kahiri Rural District Persian: دهستان کهیری
- Rural District
- Location within Iran
- Coordinates: 26°39′05″N 60°46′41″E
- Country: Iran
- Province: Sistan and Baluchestan
- County: Nik Shahr
- District: Ahuran
- Capital: Kahiri

Population (2016)
  - Total: 2,489
- Time zone: UTC+3:30 (IRST)

Kahiri Rural District (Persian: دهستان کهیری) is in Ahuran District of Nik Shahr County, Sistan and Baluchestan province, Iran. Its capital is the village of Kahiri.

== History ==
In 2013, Chanef Rural District was separated from Lashar District (Note: Renamed the Central District of Lashar County) in the formation of Ahuran District, and Kahiri Rural District was created in the new district.

== Demographics ==
=== Population ===
At the time of the 2016 National Census, the rural district's population was 2,489 in 668 households. The most populous of its 36 villages was Mashkand, with 316 people.
