= Mahban =

Village in Sistan and Baluchestan province, Iran

Mahban Persian: مهبان
- Village
- Location within Iran
- Coordinates: 26°25′37″N 60°33′07″E
- Country: Iran
- Province: Sistan and Baluchestan
- County: Nik Shahr
- District: Central
- Rural District: Mahban

Population (2016)
  - Total: 553
- Time zone: UTC+3:30 (IRST)

Mahban (Persian: مهبان) is a village in, and the capital of, Mahban Rural District of the Central District of Nik Shahr County, Sistan and Baluchestan province, Iran.

== Demographics ==
=== Population ===
At the time of the 2006 National Census, the village's population was 550 in 113 households. The following census in 2011 counted 704 people in 171 households. The 2016 census measured the population of the village as 553 people in 143 households.
