= Dastgerd Rural District =

Dastgerd Rural District (Persian: دهستان دستگرد) may refer to:

- Dastgerd Rural District (Chaharmahal and Bakhtiari Province)
- Dastgerd Rural District (Sistan and Baluchestan Province)
