= Tutan, Sistan and Baluchestan =

Village in Sistan and Baluchestan province, Iran

Tutan Persian: توتان
- Village
- Location within Iran
- Coordinates: 26°23′17″N 59°04′37″E
- Country: Iran
- Province: Sistan and Baluchestan
- County: Nik Shahr
- District: Bent
- Rural District: Tutan and Mohammadan

Population (2016)
  - Total: 370
- Time zone: UTC+3:30 (IRST)

Tutan (Persian: توتان) is a village in, and the capital of, Tutan and Mohammadan Rural District of Bent District, Nik Shahr County, Sistan and Baluchestan province, Iran.

== Demographics ==
=== Population ===
At the time of the 2006 National Census, the village's population was 429 in 93 households. The following census in 2011 counted 320 people in 75 households. The 2016 census measured the population of the village as 370 people in 97 households.
