= Heriduk Castle =

Castle in Sistan and Baluchestan Province, Iran

Heriduk castle
- قلعه هریدوک
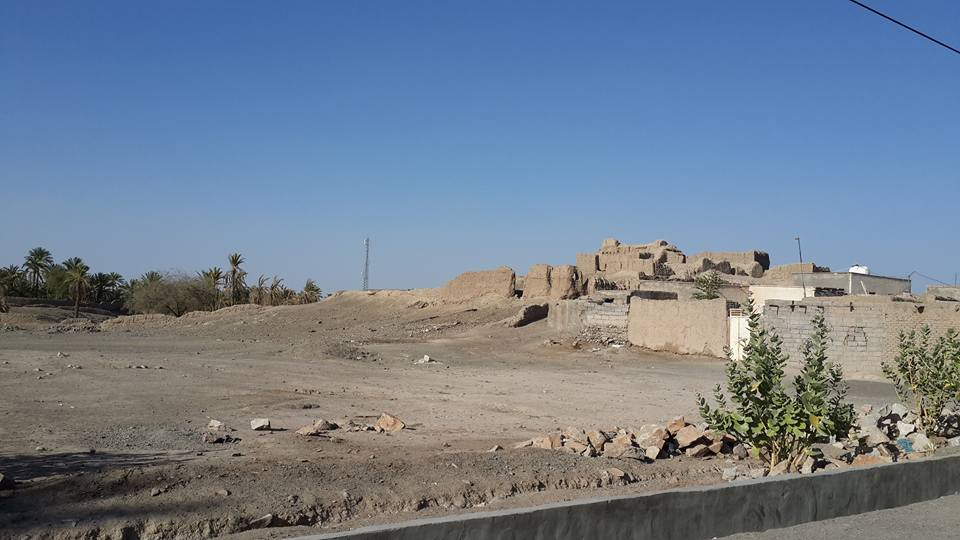
- Interactive map of the Heriduk castle area

General information
- Type: Castle
- Location: Nik Shahr County, Iran
- Coordinates: 26°42′54″N 60°09′19″E

Heriduk castle (Persian: قلعه هریدوک) is a historical castle located in Nik Shahr County in Sistan and Baluchestan Province, The longevity of this fortress dates back to the Qajar dynasty.
