= Zirbandad Rural District =

Rural district in Sistan and Baluchestan province, Iran

Zirbandad Rural District Persian: دهستان زیربانداد
- Rural District
- Location within Iran
- Coordinates: 26°48′14″N 60°03′13″E
- Country: Iran
- Province: Sistan and Baluchestan
- County: Lashar
- District: Central
- Capital: Zirbandad
- Time zone: UTC+3:30 (IRST)

Zirbandad Rural District (Persian: دهستان زیربانداد) is in the Central District (Note: Formerly Lashar District of Nik Shahr County) of Lashar County, Sistan and Baluchestan province, Iran. Its capital is the village of Zirbandad, whose population at the time of the 2016 National Census was 1,158 people in 264 households.

== History ==
After the census, Lashar District (Note: Renamed the Central District of Lashar County) was separated from Nik Shahr County in the establishment of Lashar County and renamed the Central District, and Zirbandad Rural District was created in the district.
