= Mokht Rural District =

Rural district in Sistan and Baluchestan province, Iran

Mokht Rural District Persian: دهستان مخت
- Rural District
- Location within Iran
- Coordinates: 26°00′19″N 60°10′16″E
- Country: Iran
- Province: Sistan and Baluchestan
- County: Nik Shahr
- District: Central
- Capital: Mokht

Population (2016)
  - Total: 12,395
- Time zone: UTC+3:30 (IRST)

Mokht Rural District (Persian: دهستان مخت) is in the Central District of Nik Shahr County, Sistan and Baluchestan province, Iran. Its capital is the village of Mokht.

== Demographics ==
=== Population ===
At the time of the 2006 National Census, the rural district's population was 9,340 in 1,803 households. There were 11,715 inhabitants in 2,616 households at the following census of 2011. The 2016 census measured the population of the rural district as 12,395 in 2,916 households. The most populous of its 46 villages was Mokht, with 1,647 people.
