= Bent, Iran =

City in Sistan and Baluchestan province, Iran

Bent Persian: بنت
- City
- Location within Iran
- Coordinates: 26°17′24″N 59°31′30″E
- Country: Iran
- Province: Sistan and Baluchestan
- County: Nik Shahr
- District: Bent

Population (2016)
  - Total: 5,822
- Time zone: UTC+3:30 (IRST)

Bent (Persian: بنت) (Note: Also known as Bint) is a city in, and the capital of, Bent District of Nik Shahr County, Sistan and Baluchestan province, Iran. It also serves as the administrative center for Bent Rural District.

== Demographics ==
=== Population ===
At the time of the 2006 National Census, the city's population was 4,302 in 822 households. The following census in 2011 counted 5,294 people in 1,245 households. The 2016 census measured the population of the city as 5,822 people in 1,503 households.
