= Fanuj Rural District =

Rural district in Sistan and Baluchestan province, Iran

Fanuj Rural District Persian: دهستان فنوج
- Rural District
- Location within Iran
- Coordinates: 26°39′16″N 59°37′44″E
- Country: Iran
- Province: Sistan and Baluchestan
- County: Fanuj
- District: Central
- Capital: Fanuj

Population (2016)
  - Total: 11,797
- Time zone: UTC+3:30 (IRST)

Fanuj Rural District (Persian: دهستان فنوج) is in the Central District of Fanuj County, Sistan and Baluchestan province, Iran. It is administered from the city of Fanuj.

== Demographics ==
=== Population ===
At the time of the 2006 National Census, the rural district's population (as a part of the former Fanuj District of Nik Shahr County) was 8,938 in 2,056 households. There were 11,361 inhabitants in 2,680 households at the following census of 2011. The 2016 census measured the population of the rural district as 11,797 in 3,019 households, by which time the district had been separated from the county in the establishment of Fanuj County. The rural district was transferred to the new Central District. The most populous of its 114 villages was Ramak, with 1,372 people.
