= Chahan Rural District =

Rural district in Sistan and Baluchestan province, Iran

Chahan Rural District Persian: دهستان چاهان
- Rural District
- Location within Iran
- Coordinates: 26°03′11″N 59°51′55″E
- Country: Iran
- Province: Sistan and Baluchestan
- County: Nik Shahr
- District: Central
- Capital: Chahan

Population (2016)
  - Total: 12,727
- Time zone: UTC+3:30 (IRST)

Chahan Rural District (Persian: دهستان چاهان) is in the Central District of Nik Shahr County, Sistan and Baluchestan province, Iran. Its capital is the village of Chahan.

== Demographics ==
=== Population ===
At the time of the 2006 National Census, the rural district's population was 9,771 in 1,995 households. There were 11,378 inhabitants in 2,730 households at the following census of 2011. The 2016 census measured the population of the rural district as 12,727 in 3,304 households. The most populous of its 54 villages was Maluran, with 1,142 people.
