= Lashar-e Jonubi Rural District =

Rural district in Sistan and Baluchestan province, Iran

Lashar-e Jonubi Rural District Persian: دهستان لاشار جنوبی
- Rural District
- Location within Iran
- Coordinates: 26°36′12″N 60°10′08″E
- Country: Iran
- Province: Sistan and Baluchestan
- County: Lashar
- District: Pip
- Capital: Kupch

Population (2016)
  - Total: 15,050
- Time zone: UTC+3:30 (IRST)

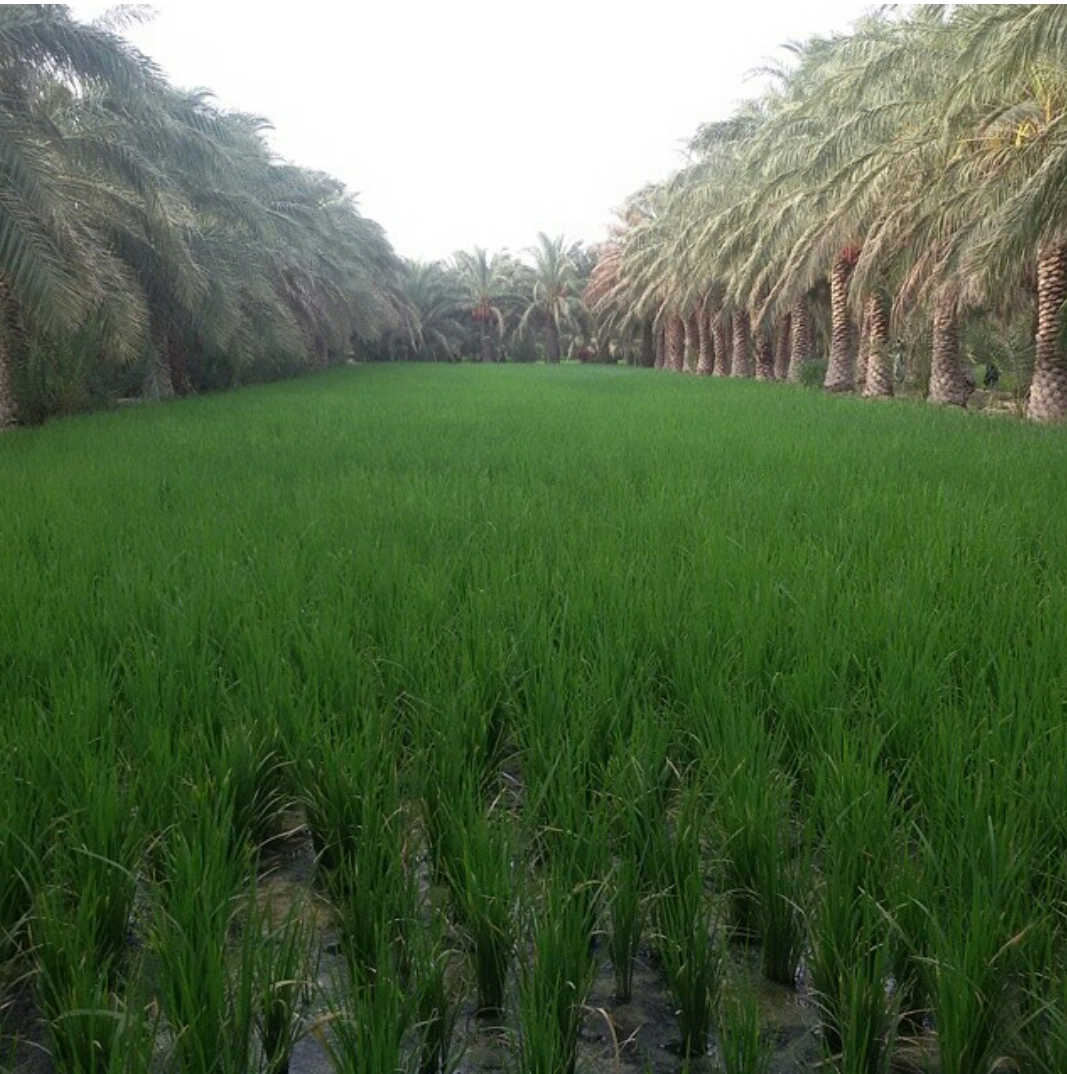

Lashar-e Jonubi Rural District (Persian: دهستان لاشار جنوبی) is in Pip District of Lashar County, Sistan and Baluchestan province, Iran. Its capital is the village of Kupch. The previous capital of the rural district was the village of Pip.

== Demographics ==
=== Population ===
At the time of the 2006 National Census, the rural district's population (as a part of Lashar District (Note: Renamed the Central District of Lashar County) in Nik Shahr County) was 12,279 in 2,592 households. There were 14,299 inhabitants in 3,696 households at the following census of 2011. The 2016 census measured the population of the rural district as 15,050 in 4,313 households. The most populous of its 93 villages was Tang-e Sarheh, with 1,789 people.

After the census, the district was separated from the county in the establishment of Lashar County and renamed the Central District. The rural district was transferred to the new Pip District.
