= Hichan Rural District =

Rural district in Sistan and Baluchestan province, Iran

Hichan Rural District Persian: دهستان هیچان
- Rural District
- Location within Iran
- Coordinates: 26°21′40″N 60°02′12″E
- Country: Iran
- Province: Sistan and Baluchestan
- County: Nik Shahr
- District: Central
- Capital: Hichan

Population (2016)
  - Total: 13,441
- Time zone: UTC+3:30 (IRST)

Hichan Rural District (Persian: دهستان هیچان) is in the Central District of Nik Shahr County, Sistan and Baluchestan province, Iran. Its capital is the village of Hichan.

== Demographics ==
=== Population ===
At the time of the 2006 National Census, the rural district's population was 10,155 in 2,111 households. There were 12,305 inhabitants in 3,023 households at the following census of 2011. The 2016 census measured the population of the rural district as 13,441 in 3,551 households. The most populous of its 82 villages was Hichan, with 2,905 people.

== See also ==
Konardan, a village in the rural district
