= Pip District =

District in Sistan and Baluchestan province, Iran

Pip District Persian: بخش پیپ
- District
- Location within Iran
- Coordinates: 26°35′22″N 60°05′42″E
- Country: Iran
- Province: Sistan and Baluchestan
- County: Lashar
- Capital: Pip
- Time zone: UTC+3:30 (IRST)

Pip District (Persian: بخش پیپ) is in Lashar County, Sistan and Baluchestan province, Iran. Its capital is the village of Pip, whose population at the time of the 2016 National Census was 1,550 in 441 households.

== History ==
After the 2016 census, Lashar District (Note: Renamed the Central District of Lashar County) was separated from Nik Shahr County in the establishment of Lashar County and renamed the Central District. The new county was divided into two districts of two rural districts each, with Espakeh as its capital and only city.

== Demographics ==
=== Administrative divisions ===
Pip District
Administrative Divisions
Lashar-e Jonubi RD
Tang-e Sarheh RD
RD = Rural District
