= Maskutan Rural District =

Rural district in Sistan and Baluchestan province, Iran

Maskutan Rural District Persian: دهستان مسکوتان
- Rural District
- Location within Iran
- Coordinates: 26°50′52″N 59°47′37″E
- Country: Iran
- Province: Sistan and Baluchestan
- County: Fanuj
- District: Central
- Capital: Maskutan

Population (2016)
  - Total: 11,110
- Time zone: UTC+3:30 (IRST)

Maskutan Rural District (Persian: دهستان مسکوتان) is in the Central District of Fanuj County, Sistan and Baluchestan province, Iran. Its capital is the village of Maskutan.

== Demographics ==
=== Population ===
At the time of the 2006 National Census, the rural district's population (as a part of the former Fanuj District of Nik Shahr County) was 8,647 in 1,821 households. There were 10,000 inhabitants in 2,385 households at the following census of 2011. The 2016 census measured the population of the rural district as 11,110 in 2,746 households, by which time the district had been separated from the county in the establishment of Fanuj County. The rural district was transferred to the new Central District. The most populous of its 51 villages was Maskutan, with 4,282 people.
