= Central District (Fanuj County) =

District in Sistan and Baluchestan province, Iran

Central District (Fanuj County) Persian: بخش مرکزی شهرستان فنوج
- District
- Location within Iran
- Coordinates: 26°43′44″N 59°41′21″E
- Country: Iran
- Province: Sistan and Baluchestan
- County: Fanuj
- Capital: Fanuj

Population (2016)
  - Total: 35,977
- Time zone: UTC+3:30 (IRST)

The Central District of Fanuj County (Persian: بخش مرکزی شهرستان فنوج) is in Sistan and Baluchestan province, Iran. Its capital is the city of Fanuj.

== History ==
After the 2011 National Census, Fanuj District was separated from Nik Shahr County in the establishment of Fanuj County, which was divided into two districts of two rural districts each, with Fanuj as its capital and only city at the time.

== Demographics ==
=== Population ===
At the time of the 2016 census, the district's population was 35,977 inhabitants in 9,175 households.

=== Administrative divisions ===
Central District (Fanuj County) Population
Administrative Divisions	2016
Fanuj RD	11,797
Maskutan RD	11,110
Fanuj (city)	13,070
Total	35,977
RD = Rural District
