= Mahban Rural District =

Rural district in Sistan and Baluchestan province, Iran

Mahban Rural District Persian: دهستان مهبان
- Rural District
- Location within Iran
- Coordinates: 26°25′09″N 60°29′19″E
- Country: Iran
- Province: Sistan and Baluchestan
- County: Nik Shahr
- District: Central
- Capital: Mahban

Population (2016)
  - Total: 10,421
- Time zone: UTC+3:30 (IRST)

Mahban Rural District (Persian: دهستان مهبان) is in the Central District of Nik Shahr County, Sistan and Baluchestan province, Iran. Its capital is the village of Mahban.

== Demographics ==
=== Population ===
At the time of the 2006 National Census, the rural district's population was 8,309 in 1,870 households. There were 9,830 inhabitants in 2,393 households at the following census of 2011. The 2016 census measured the population of the rural district as 10,421 in 2,815 households. The most populous of its 59 villages was Darukan, with 1,311 people.
