= Bent Rural District =

Rural district in Sistan and Baluchestan province, Iran

Bent Rural District Persian: دهستان بنت
- Rural District
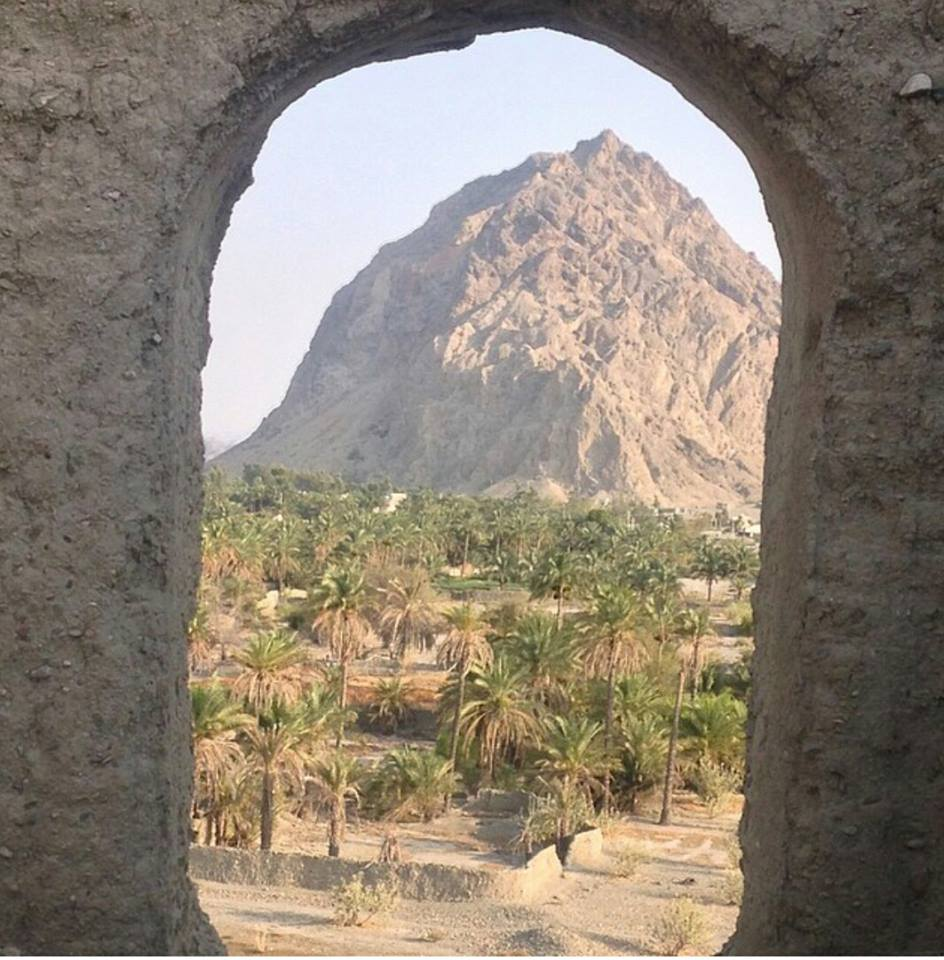
- View of Mount Siperk

- Location within Iran
- Coordinates: 26°12′49″N 59°34′07″E
- Country: Iran
- Province: Sistan and Baluchestan
- County: Nik Shahr
- District: Bent
- Capital: Bent

Population (2016)
  - Total: 12,192
- Time zone: UTC+3:30 (IRST)

Bent Rural District (Persian: دهستان بنت) is in Bent District of Nik Shahr County, Sistan and Baluchestan province, Iran. It is administered from the city of Bent.

== Demographics ==
=== Population ===
At the time of the 2006 National Census, the rural district's population was 9,536 in 2,021 households. There were 10,482 inhabitants in 2,609 households at the following census of 2011. The 2016 census measured the population of the rural district as 12,192 in 3,412 households. The most populous of its 36 villages was Dask, with 2,059 people.
