= Fanuj =

City in Sistan and Baluchestan province, Iran

Fanuj Persian: فنوج
- City
- Location within Iran
- Coordinates: 26°34′31″N 59°38′25″E
- Country: Iran
- Province: Sistan and Baluchestan
- County: Fanuj
- District: Central

Population (2016)
  - Total: 13,070
- Time zone: UTC+3:30 (IRST)

Fanuj (Persian: فنوج) (Note: Also romanized as Fannūj and Fanūj; also known as Fānūch and Pannūj) is a city in the Central District of Fanuj County, Sistan and Baluchestan province, Iran, serving as capital of both the county and the district. It is also the administrative center for Fanuj Rural District.

Fanuj is estimated to sit on 3.6 billion tonnes of titanium reserves. The Fanuj prospect includes a cluster of 30 deposits, each able to yield 1 million tonnes of titanium ore per year.

== Demographics ==
=== Population ===
At the time of the 2006 National Census, the city's population was 9,706 in 2,124 households, when it was capital of the former Fanuj District of Nik Shahr County. The following census in 2011 counted 11,577 people in 2,829 households. The 2016 census measured the population of the city as 13,070 people in 3,410 households, by which time the district had been separated from the county in the establishment of Fanuj County. The city and the rural district were transferred to the new Central District, with Fanuj as the county's capital.
