= Kotij Rural District =

Rural district in Sistan and Baluchestan province, Iran

Kotij Rural District Persian: دهستان کتیج
- Rural District
- Location within Iran
- Coordinates: 26°41′32″N 59°05′45″E
- Country: Iran
- Province: Sistan and Baluchestan
- County: Fanuj
- District: Kotij
- Capital: Kotij

Population (2016)
  - Total: 7,271
- Time zone: UTC+3:30 (IRST)

Kotij Rural District (Persian: دهستان کتیج) is in Kotij District of Fanuj County, Sistan and Baluchestan province, Iran. It is administered from the city of Kotij.

== Demographics ==
=== Population ===
At the time of the 2006 National Census, the rural district's population (as a part of the former Fanuj District of Nik Shahr County) was 11,168 in 2,449 households. There were 12,699 inhabitants in 3,085 households at the following census of 2011. The 2016 census measured the population of the rural district as 7,271 in 1,950 households, by which time the district had been separated from the county in the establishment of Fanuj County. The rural district was transferred to the new Kotij District. The most populous of its 45 villages was Kotij (now a city), with 3,016 people.
