= Lashar-e Shomali Rural District =

Rural district in Sistan and Baluchestan province, Iran

Lashar-e Shomali Rural District Persian: دهستان لاشار شمالی
- Rural District
- Location within Iran
- Coordinates: 26°50′21″N 60°14′56″E
- Country: Iran
- Province: Sistan and Baluchestan
- County: Lashar
- District: Central
- Capital: Espakeh

Population (2016)
  - Total: 14,204
- Time zone: UTC+3:30 (IRST)

Lashar-e Shomali Rural District (Persian: دهستان لاشار شمالی) is in the Central District (Note: Formerly Lashar District of Nik Shahr County) of Lashar County, Sistan and Baluchestan province, Iran. It is administered from the city of Espakeh.

== Demographics ==
=== Population ===
At the time of the 2006 National Census, the rural district's population (as a part of Lashar District (Note: Renamed the Central District of Lashar County) of Nik Shahr County) was 11,302 in 2,449 households. There were 12,785 inhabitants in 3,140 households at the following census of 2011. The 2016 census measured the population of the rural district as 14,204 in 3,683 households. The most populous of its 41 villages was Seyfabad-e Javashiri, with 1,759 people.

After the census, the district was separated from the county in the establishment of Lashar County and renamed the Central District.
