= Ahuran District =

District in Sistan and Baluchestan province, Iran

Ahuran District Persian: بخش آهوران
- District
- Location within Iran
- Coordinates: 26°44′04″N 60°35′40″E
- Country: Iran
- Province: Sistan and Baluchestan
- County: Nik Shahr
- Capital: Chanef

Population (2016)
  - Total: 12,453
- Time zone: UTC+3:30 (IRST)

Ahuran District (Persian: بخش آهوران) is in Nik Shahr County, Sistan and Baluchestan province, Iran. Its capital is the city of Chanef.

== History ==
In 2013, Chanef Rural District was separated from Lashar District (Note: Renamed the Central District of Lashar County) in the formation of Ahuran District. After the 2016 National Census, the village of Chanef was elevated to the status of a city.

== Demographics ==
=== Population ===
At the time of the 2016 census, the district's population was 12,453 inhabitants in 3,385 households.

=== Administrative divisions ===
Ahuran District Population
Administrative Divisions	2016
Chanef RD	9,964
Kahiri RD	2,489
Chanef (city) (Note: Became a city after the 2016 census)	
Total	12,453
RD = Rural District
