= Espakeh =

City in Sistan and Baluchestan province, Iran

Espakeh Persian: اسپكه
- City
- Location within Iran
- Coordinates: 26°50′15″N 60°10′25″E
- Country: Iran
- Province: Sistan and Baluchestan
- County: Lashar
- District: Central

Population (2016)
  - Total: 4,719
- Time zone: UTC+3:30 (IRST)

Espakeh (Persian: اسپكه) (Note: Also romanized as Aspakeh and Ispakeh; also known as Esfakeh and Isfakeh) is a city in the Central District (Note: Formerly Lashar District of Nik Shahr County) of Lashar County, Sistan and Baluchestan province, Iran, serving as capital of both the county and the district. It is also the administrative center for Lashar-e Shomali Rural District.

== Demographics ==
=== Population ===
At the time of the 2006 National Census, the city's population was 2,995 in 622 households, when it was in Lashar District (Note: Renamed the Central District of Lashar County) of Nik Shahr County. The following census in 2011 counted 3,636 people in 885 households. The 2016 census measured the population of the city as 4,719 people in 1,127 households.

After the census, the district was separated from the county in the establishment of Lashar County and renamed the Central District, with Espakeh as the new county's capital.
