= Dastgerd Rural District (Nik Shahr County) =

Rural district in Sistan and Baluchestan province, Iran

Dastgerd Rural District Persian: دهستان دستگرد
- Rural District
- Location within Iran
- Coordinates: 26°15′36″N 59°20′59″E
- Country: Iran
- Province: Sistan and Baluchestan
- County: Nik Shahr
- District: Bent
- Capital: Dastgerd

Population (2016)
  - Total: 6,260
- Time zone: UTC+3:30 (IRST)

Dastgerd Rural District (Persian: دهستان دستگرد) is in Bent District of Nik Shahr County, Sistan and Baluchestan province, Iran. Its capital is the village of Dastgerd.

== Demographics ==
=== Population ===
At the time of the 2006 National Census, the rural district's population was 4,334 in 842 households. There were 5,250 inhabitants in 1,270 households at the following census of 2011. The 2016 census measured the population of the rural district as 6,260 in 1,736 households. The most populous of its 56 villages was Dastgerd, with 1,547 people.
