= Tutan and Mohammadan Rural District =

Rural district in Sistan and Baluchestan province, Iran

Tutan and Mohammadan Rural District Persian: دهستان توتان و مهمدان
- Rural District
- Location within Iran
- Coordinates: 26°16′24″N 59°02′30″E
- Country: Iran
- Province: Sistan and Baluchestan
- County: Nik Shahr
- District: Bent
- Capital: Tutan

Population (2016)
  - Total: 4,448
- Time zone: UTC+3:30 (IRST)

Tutan and Mohammadan Rural District (Persian: دهستان توتان و مهمدان) is in Bent District of Nik Shahr County, Sistan and Baluchestan province, Iran. Its capital is the village of Tutan.

== Demographics ==
=== Population ===
At the time of the 2006 National Census, the rural district's population was 3,087 in 674 households. There were 3,615 inhabitants in 959 households at the following census of 2011. The 2016 census measured the population of the rural district as 4,448 in 1,296 households. The most populous of its 48 villages was Hakran, with 487 people.
