= Chanef Rural District =

Rural district in Sistan and Baluchestan province, Iran

Chanef Rural District Persian: دهستان چانف
- Rural District
- Location within Iran
- Coordinates: 26°44′36″N 60°32′40″E
- Country: Iran
- Province: Sistan and Baluchestan
- County: Nik Shahr
- District: Ahuran
- Capital: Chanef

Population (2016)
  - Total: 9,964
- Time zone: UTC+3:30 (IRST)

Chanef Rural District (Persian: دهستان چانف) is in Ahuran District of Nik Shahr County, Sistan and Baluchestan province, Iran. It is administered from the city of Chanef.

== Demographics ==
=== Population ===
At the time of the 2006 National Census, the rural district's population (as a part of Lashar District (Note: Renamed the Central District of Lashar County)) was 10,497 in 2,490 households. There were 11,394 inhabitants in 2,830 households at the following census of 2011. The 2016 census measured the population of the rural district as 9,964 in 2,717 households, by which time the rural district had been separated from the district in the establishment of Ahuran District. The most populous of its 75 villages was Chanef (now a city), with 417 people.
