= Fanuj County =

County in Sistan and Baluchestan province, Iran

Fanuj County Persian: شهرستان فنوج
- County
- Location of Fanuj County in Sistan and Baluchestan province (center left, pink)

- Location of Sistan and Baluchestan province in Iran
- Coordinates: 26°43′44″N 59°30′30″E
- Country: Iran
- Province: Sistan and Baluchestan
- Capital: Fanuj
- Districts: Central, Kotij

Population (2016)
  - Total: 49,161
- Time zone: UTC+3:30 (IRST)

Fanuj County (Persian: شهرستان فنوج) is in Sistan and Baluchestan province, Iran. Its capital is the city of Fanuj.

== History ==
After the 2011 National Census, Fanuj District was separated from Nik Shahr County in the establishment of Fanuj County, which was divided into two districts of two rural districts each, with Fanuj as its capital and only city at the time.

After the 2016 census, the village of Kotij was elevated to the status of a city.

== Demographics ==
=== Population ===
At the time of the 2016 census, the county's population was 49,161 in 12,604 households.

=== Administrative divisions ===
Fanuj County's population and administrative structure are shown in the following table.

Fanuj County Population
Administrative Divisions	2016
Central District	35,977
Fanuj RD	11,797
Maskutan RD	11,110
Fanuj (city)	13,070
Kotij District	13,184
Kotij RD	7,271
Mohtaramabad RD	5,913
Kotij (city) (Note: Became a city after the 2016 census)	
Total	49,161
RD = Rural District

== See also ==
Media related to Fanuj County at Wikimedia Commons
