= Bent District =

District in Sistan and Baluchestan province, Iran

Bent District Persian: بخش بنت
- District
- Location within Iran
- Coordinates: 26°15′47″N 59°14′46″E
- Country: Iran
- Province: Sistan and Baluchestan
- County: Nik Shahr
- Capital: Bent

Population (2016)
  - Total: 28,722
- Time zone: UTC+3:30 (IRST)

Bent District (Persian: بخش بنت) is in Nik Shahr County, Sistan and Baluchestan province, Iran. Its capital is the city of Bent.

== Demographics ==
=== Population ===
At the time of the 2006 National Census, the district's population was 21,259 in 4,359 households. The following census in 2011 counted 24,641 people in 6,083 households. The 2016 census measured the population of the district as 28,722 inhabitants in 7,947 households.

=== Administrative divisions ===
Bent District Population
Administrative Divisions	2006	2011	2016
Bent RD	9,536	10,482	12,192
Dastgerd RD	4,334	5,250	6,260
Tutan and Mohammadan RD	3,087	3,615	4,448
Bent (city)	4,302	5,294	5,822
Total	21,259	24,641	28,722
RD = Rural District
