= Fanuj District =

Former district in Sistan and Baluchestan province, Iran

Fanuj District Persian: بخش فنوج
- Former District
- Location within Iran
- Coordinates: 26°43′44″N 59°30′30″E
- Country: Iran
- Province: Sistan and Baluchestan
- County: Nik Shahr
- Capital: Fanuj

Population (2011)
  - Total: 45,637
- Time zone: UTC+3:30 (IRST)

Fanuj District (Persian: بخش فنوج) is a former administrative division of Nik Shahr County, Sistan and Baluchestan province, Iran. Its capital was the city of Fanuj.

== History ==
After the 2011 National Census, the district was separated from the county in the establishment of Fanuj County.

== Demographics ==
=== Population ===
At the time of the 2006 census, the district's population was 38,459 in 8,450 households. The following census in 2011 counted 45,637 people in 10,979 households.

=== Administrative divisions ===
Fanuj District Population
Administrative Divisions	2006	2011
Fanuj RD	8,938	11,361
Kotij RD	11,168	12,699
Maskutan RD	8,647	10,000
Fanuj (city)	9,706	11,577
Total	38,459	45,637
RD = Rural District
