= Central District (Nik Shahr County) =

District in Sistan and Baluchestan province, Iran

Central District (Nik Shahr County) Persian: بخش مرکزی شهرستان نیک‌شهر
- District
- Location within Iran
- Coordinates: 26°08′35″N 60°07′44″E
- Country: Iran
- Province: Sistan and Baluchestan
- County: Nik Shahr
- Capital: Nik Shahr

Population (2016)
  - Total: 66,716
- Time zone: UTC+3:30 (IRST)

The Central District of Nik Shahr County (Persian: بخش مرکزی شهرستان نیک‌شهر) is in Sistan and Baluchestan province, Iran. Its capital is the city of Nik Shahr.

== Demographics ==
=== Population ===
At the time of the 2006 National Census, the district's population was 50,842 in 10,144 households. The following census in 2011 counted 61,117 people in 14,161 households. The 2016 census measured the population of the district as 66,716 inhabitants in 16,742 households.

=== Administrative divisions ===
Central District (Nik Shahr County) Population
Administrative Divisions	2006	2011	2016
Chahan RD	9,771	11,378	12,727
Hichan RD	10,155	12,305	13,441
Mahban RD	8,309	9,830	10,421
Mokht RD	9,340	11,715	12,395
Nik Shahr (city)	13,267	15,889	17,732
Total	50,842	61,117	66,716
RD = Rural District
