= Central District (Lashar County) =

District in Sistan and Baluchestan province, Iran

Central District (Lashar County) Persian: بخش مرکزی شهرستان لاشار
- District
- Location within Iran
- Coordinates: 26°50′21″N 60°12′47″E
- Country: Iran
- Province: Sistan and Baluchestan
- County: Lashar
- Capital: Espakeh

Population (2016)
  - Total: 33,973 (Note: As Lashar District of Nik Shahr County)
- Time zone: UTC+3:30 (IRST)

The Central District of Lashar County (Persian: بخش مرکزی شهرستان لاشار) (Note: Formerly Lashar District of Nik Shahr County) is in Sistan and Baluchestan province, Iran. Its capital is the city of Espakeh.

== History ==
After the 2016 census, Lashar District (Note: Renamed the Central District of Lashar County) was separated from Nik Shahr County in the establishment of Lashar County, which was divided into two districts of two rural districts each, with Espakeh as its capital and only city.

== Demographics ==
=== Population ===
At the time of the 2006 census, the district's population (as Lashar District of Nik Shahr County) was 26,576 in 5,663 households. The following census in 2011 counted 30,720 people in 7,721 households. The 2016 census measured the population of the district as 33,973 inhabitants in 9,123 households.

=== Administrative divisions ===
Central District (Lashar County) Population (Note: As Lashar District of Nik Shahr County at the 2006, 2011, and 2016 censuses)
Administrative Divisions	2006	2011	2016
Chanef RD (Note: Transferred to Ahuran District)	10,497	11,394	
Lashar-e Jonubi RD (Note: Transferred to Pip District)	12,279	14,299	15,050
Lashar-e Shomali RD	11,302	12,785	14,204
Zirbandar RD (Note: Established after the 2016 census)			
Espakeh (city)	2,995	3,636	4,719
Total	37,073	42,114	33,973
RD = Rural District
