= Lashar County =

County in Sistan and Baluchestan province, Iran

Lashar County Persian: شهرستان لاشار
- County
- Location of Lashar County in Sistan and Baluchestan province (center left, purple)

- Location of Sistan and Baluchestan province in Iran
- Coordinates: 26°43′53″N 60°09′33″E
- Country: Iran
- Province: Sistan and Baluchestan
- Capital: Espakeh
- Districts: Central, Pip
- Time zone: UTC+3:30 (IRST)

Lashar County (Persian: شهرستان لاشار) is in Sistan and Baluchestan province, Iran. Its capital is the city of Espakeh, whose population at the time of the 2016 National Census was 4,719 in 1,127 households.

== History ==
After the 2016 census, Lashar District (Note: Renamed the Central District of Lashar County) was separated from Nik Shahr County in the establishment of Lashar County, which was divided into two districts of two rural districts each, with Espakeh as its capital and only city.

== Demographics ==
=== Administrative divisions ===
Lashar County's administrative structure is shown in the following table.

Lashar County
Administrative Divisions
Central District (Note: Formerly Lashar District of Nik Shahr County)
Lashar-e Shomali RD
Zirbandar RD
Espakeh (city)
Pip District
Lashar-e Jonubi RD
Tang-e Sarheh RD
RD = Rural District

== See also ==
Media related to Lashar County at Wikimedia Commons
