= Nik Shahr County =

County in Sistan and Baluchestan province, Iran

Nik Shahr County Persian: شهرستان نیک‌شهر
- County
- Location of Nik Shahr County in Sistan and Baluchestan province (bottom left, yellow)

- Location of Sistan and Baluchestan province in Iran
- Coordinates: 26°20′28″N 59°51′52″E
- Country: Iran
- Province: Sistan and Baluchestan
- Capital: Nik Shahr
- Districts: Central, Ahuran, Bent

Population (2016)
  - Total: 141,894
- Time zone: UTC+3:30 (IRST)

Nik Shahr County (Persian: شهرستان نیک‌شهر) is in Sistan and Baluchestan province, Iran. Its capital is the city of Nik Shahr.

== History ==
After the 2011 National Census, Fanuj District was separated from the county in the establishment of Fanuj County, and Qasr-e Qand District to establish Qasr-e Qand County. Additionally, Chanef Rural District was separated from Lashar District in the formation of Ahuran District, including the new Kahiri Rural District.

After the 2016 census, Lashar District (Note: Renamed the Central District of Lashar County) was separated from the county in establishing Lashar County. The village of Chanef was elevated to the status of a city.

== Demographics ==
=== Population ===
At the time of the 2006 census, the county's population was 185,355 in 37,858 households. The following census in 2011 counted 212,963 people in 50,419 households. The 2016 census measured the population of the county as 141,894 in 37,207 households.

=== Administrative divisions ===
Nik Shahr County's population history and administrative structure over three consecutive censuses are shown in the following table.

Nik Shahr County Population
Administrative Divisions	2006	2011	2016
Central District	50,842	61,117	66,716
Chahan RD	9,771	11,378	12,727
Hichan RD	10,155	12,305	13,441
Mahban RD	8,309	9,830	10,421
Mokht RD	9,340	11,715	12,395
Nik Shahr (city)	13,267	15,889	17,732
Ahuran District			12,453
Chanef RD			9,964
Kahiri RD			2,489
Chanef (city) (Note: Became a city after the 2016 census)			
Bent District	21,259	24,641	28,722
Bent RD	9,536	10,482	12,192
Dastgerd RD	4,334	5,250	6,260
Tutan and Mohammadan RD	3,087	3,615	4,448
Bent (city)	4,302	5,294	5,822
Fanuj District (Note: Transferred to Fanuj County)	38,459	45,637	
Fanuj RD	8,938	11,361	
Kotij RD	11,168	12,699	
Maskutan RD	8,647	10,000	
Fanuj (city)	9,706	11,577	
Lashar District (Note: Transferred to Lashar County)	37,073	42,114	33,973
Chanef RD	10,497	11,394	
Lashar-e Jonubi RD	12,279	14,299	15,050
Lashar-e Shomali RD	11,302	12,785	14,204
Espakeh (city)	2,995	3,636	4,719
Qasr-e Qand District (Note: Transferred to Qasr-e Qand County)	37,722	39,414	
Holunchekan RD	9,168	11,226	
Sarbuk RD	17,728	19,625	
Qasr-e Qand (city)	10,826	8,563	
Total	185,355	212,963	141,894
RD = Rural District

== See also ==
Media related to Nik Shahr County at Wikimedia Commons
