= Bonari (disambiguation) =

Bonari is a village in Kohgiluyeh and Boyer-Ahmad Province, Iran.

Bonari or Banari or Benari (Persian: بناري) may also refer to:

- Bonari-ye Fathi
- Bonari-ye Olya
- Bonari-ye Sofla
- Banari, Zanjan
- Bonari language, an extinct language of Brazil
