= Cheshmeh Zaferan =

Cheshmeh Zaferan چشمه زعفران
- Village
- Location within Iran
- Coordinates: 30°45′48″N 50°41′15″E
- Country: Iran
- Province: Kohgiluyeh and Boyer-Ahmad
- County: Charam
- Bakhsh: Central
- Rural District: Alqchin

Population (2006)
  - Total: 97
- Time zone: UTC+3:30 (IRST)
  - Summer (DST): UTC+4:30 (IRDT)

Cheshmeh Zaferan (Persian: چشمه زعفران, also Romanized as Cheshmeh Zaʿferān) is a village in Alqchin Rural District, in the Central District of Charam County, Kohgiluyeh and Boyer-Ahmad Province, Iran. At the 2006 census, its population was 97, in 16 families.
