= Alqchin =

Alqchin or Alqechin or Elqechin (Persian: القچین) may refer to:

- Alqchin-e Olya
- Alqchin-e Sofla
- Alqchin Rural District
