= Amirshahriyar =

Amirshahriyar اميرشهريار
- Village
- Location within Iran
- Coordinates: 30°47′48″N 50°42′47″E
- Country: Iran
- Province: Kohgiluyeh and Boyer-Ahmad
- County: Charam
- Bakhsh: Central
- Rural District: Alqchin

Population (2006)
  - Total: 24
- Time zone: UTC+3:30 (IRST)
  - Summer (DST): UTC+4:30 (IRDT)

Amirshahriyar (Persian: اميرشهريار, also Romanized as Amīrshahrīyār) is a village in Alqchin Rural District, in the Central District of Charam County, Kohgiluyeh and Boyer-Ahmad Province, Iran. At the 2006 census, its population was 24, in 5 families.
