= Choru, Kohgiluyeh and Boyer-Ahmad =

Choru چرو
- Village
- Location within Iran
- Coordinates: 30°45′16″N 50°47′16″E
- Country: Iran
- Province: Kohgiluyeh and Boyer-Ahmad
- County: Charam
- Bakhsh: Central
- Rural District: Charam

Population (2006)
  - Total: 43
- Time zone: UTC+3:30 (IRST)
  - Summer (DST): UTC+4:30 (IRDT)

Choru (Persian: چرو, also Romanized as Chorū; also known as Chowrū, Chūrū, and Jūrū) is a village in Charam Rural District, in the Central District of Charam County, Kohgiluyeh and Boyer-Ahmad Province, Iran. At the 2006 census, its population was 43, in 10 families.
