= Deli Barik-e Rudbal =

Deli Barik-e Rudbal دلي باريك رودبال
- Village
- Location within Iran
- Coordinates: 30°38′28″N 50°46′57″E
- Country: Iran
- Province: Kohgiluyeh and Boyer-Ahmad
- County: Charam
- Bakhsh: Central
- Rural District: Charam

Population (2006)
  - Total: 192
- Time zone: UTC+3:30 (IRST)
  - Summer (DST): UTC+4:30 (IRDT)

Deli Barik-e Rudbal (Persian: دلي باريك رودبال, also Romanized as Delī Bārīk-e Rūdbāl; also known as Delī Bārīk) is a village in Charam Rural District, in the Central District of Charam County, Kohgiluyeh and Boyer-Ahmad Province, Iran. At the 2006 census, its population was 192, in 37 families.
