= Fashian =

Fashian فشيان
- Village
- Location within Iran
- Coordinates: 30°42′03″N 50°44′40″E
- Country: Iran
- Province: Kohgiluyeh and Boyer-Ahmad
- County: Charam
- Bakhsh: Central
- Rural District: Charam

Population (2006)
  - Total: 552
- Time zone: UTC+3:30 (IRST)
  - Summer (DST): UTC+4:30 (IRDT)

Fashian (Persian: فشيان, also Romanized as Fashīān, Fashiyan, and Fashyān; also known as Fashium) is a village in Charam Rural District, in the Central District of Charam County, Kohgiluyeh and Boyer-Ahmad Province, Iran. At the 2006 census, its population was 552, in 89 families.
