= Abbas Ali va Qafeleh Bah =

Abbas Ali va Qafeleh Bah عباسعلي وقافله به
- Village
- Country: Iran
- Province: Kohgiluyeh and Boyer-Ahmad
- County: Charam
- Bakhsh: Central
- Rural District: Charam

Population (2006)
  - Total: 78
- Time zone: UTC+3:30 (IRST)
  - Summer (DST): UTC+4:30 (IRDT)

Abbas Ali va Qafeleh Bah (Persian: عباسعلي وقافله به, also Romanized as ʿAbbās ʿAlī va Qāfeleh Bah) is a village in Charam Rural District, in the Central District of Charam County, Kohgiluyeh and Boyer-Ahmad Province, Iran. At the 2006 census, its population was 78, in 12 families.
