= Garri-ye Ab Kenaru =

Garri-ye Ab Kenaru گري اب كنارو
- Village
- Location within Iran
- Coordinates: 30°43′08″N 50°52′46″E
- Country: Iran
- Province: Kohgiluyeh and Boyer-Ahmad
- County: Charam
- Bakhsh: Central
- Rural District: Charam

Population (2006)
  - Total: 220
- Time zone: UTC+3:30 (IRST)
  - Summer (DST): UTC+4:30 (IRDT)

Garri-ye Ab Kenaru (Persian: گري اب كنارو, also Romanized as Garrī-ye Āb Kenārū; also known as Garrī, Garrī-ye Pā’īn, Garrī-ye Soflá, Gerrey, and Karreh) is a village in Charam Rural District, in the Central District of Charam County, Kohgiluyeh and Boyer-Ahmad Province, Iran. At the 2006 census, its population was 220, in 37 families.
