= Puzeh Do Demeh =

Puzeh Do Demeh پوزه دودمه
- Village
- Location within Iran
- Coordinates: 30°38′01″N 50°50′09″E
- Country: Iran
- Province: Kohgiluyeh and Boyer-Ahmad
- County: Charam
- Bakhsh: Central
- Rural District: Charam

Population (2006)
  - Total: 26
- Time zone: UTC+3:30 (IRST)
  - Summer (DST): UTC+4:30 (IRDT)

Puzeh Do Demeh (Persian: پوزه دودمه, also Romanized as Pūzeh Do Demeh; also known as Pūzehdeymeh) is a village in Charam Rural District, in the Central District of Charam County, Kohgiluyeh and Boyer-Ahmad Province, Iran. At the 2006 census, its population was 26, in 5 families.
