= Katal Vasili =

Katal Vasili كتل ويسعلي
- Village
- Location within Iran
- Coordinates: 30°42′57″N 50°51′38″E
- Country: Iran
- Province: Kohgiluyeh and Boyer-Ahmad
- County: Charam
- Bakhsh: Central
- Rural District: Charam

Population (2006)
  - Total: 101
- Time zone: UTC+3:30 (IRST)
  - Summer (DST): UTC+4:30 (IRDT)

Katal Vasili (Persian: كتل ويسعلي, also Romanized as Katal Vasīlī) is a village in Charam Rural District, in the Central District of Charam County, Kohgiluyeh and Boyer-Ahmad Province, Iran. At the 2006 census, its population was 101, in 19 families.
