= Rudnun =

Rudnun رودنون
- Village
- Location within Iran
- Coordinates: 30°39′13″N 50°56′26″E
- Country: Iran
- Province: Kohgiluyeh and Boyer-Ahmad
- County: Charam
- Bakhsh: Central
- Rural District: Charam

Population (2006)
  - Total: 73
- Time zone: UTC+3:30 (IRST)
  - Summer (DST): UTC+4:30 (IRDT)

Rudnun (Persian: رودنون, also Romanized as Rūdnūn; also known as Rūdnan) is a village in Charam Rural District, in the Central District of Charam County, Kohgiluyeh and Boyer-Ahmad Province, Iran. At the 2006 census, its population was 73, in 15 families.
