= Balahdan =

Balahdan بلهدان
- Village
- Location within Iran
- Coordinates: 30°46′36″N 50°43′46″E
- Country: Iran
- Province: Kohgiluyeh and Boyer-Ahmad
- County: Charam
- Bakhsh: Central
- Rural District: Alqchin

Population (2006)
  - Total: 476
- Time zone: UTC+3:30 (IRST)
  - Summer (DST): UTC+4:30 (IRDT)

Balahdan (Persian: بلهدان, also Romanized as Balahdān; also known as Baladān) is a village in Alqchin Rural District, in the Central District of Charam County, Kohgiluyeh and Boyer-Ahmad Province, Iran. At the 2006 census, its population was 476, in 80 families.
