= Tugabri =

Tugabri توگبري
- Village
- Location within Iran
- Coordinates: 30°39′33″N 50°49′33″E
- Country: Iran
- Province: Kohgiluyeh and Boyer-Ahmad
- County: Charam
- Bakhsh: Central
- Rural District: Charam

Population (2006)
  - Total: 222
- Time zone: UTC+3:30 (IRST)
  - Summer (DST): UTC+4:30 (IRDT)

Tugabri (Persian: توگبري, also Romanized as Tūgabrī) is a village in Charam Rural District, in the Central District of Charam County, Kohgiluyeh and Boyer-Ahmad Province, Iran. At the 2006 census, its population was 222, in 47 families.
