= Darreh Shir =

Darreh Shir or Darrehshir (Persian: دره شير) may refer to:

- Darreh Shir, Chaharmahal and Bakhtiari
- Darreh Shir, Kohgiluyeh and Boyer-Ahmad
- Darreh Shir, Yazd
