= Darreh Shiri-ye Gerdab =

Darreh Shiri-ye Gerdab دره شيري گرداب
- Village
- Location within Iran
- Coordinates: 30°38′00″N 50°43′00″E
- Country: Iran
- Province: Kohgiluyeh and Boyer-Ahmad
- County: Charam
- Bakhsh: Central
- Rural District: Charam

Population (2006)
  - Total: 270
- Time zone: UTC+3:30 (IRST)
  - Summer (DST): UTC+4:30 (IRDT)

Darreh Shiri-ye Gerdab (Persian: دره شيري گرداب, also Romanized as Darreh Shīrī-ye Gerdāb; also known as Darreh Shīr) is a village in Charam Rural District, in the Central District of Charam County, Kohgiluyeh and Boyer-Ahmad Province, Iran. At the 2006 census, its population was 270, in 45 families.
