= Spring (hydrology) =

Point at which water emerges from an aquifer to the surface

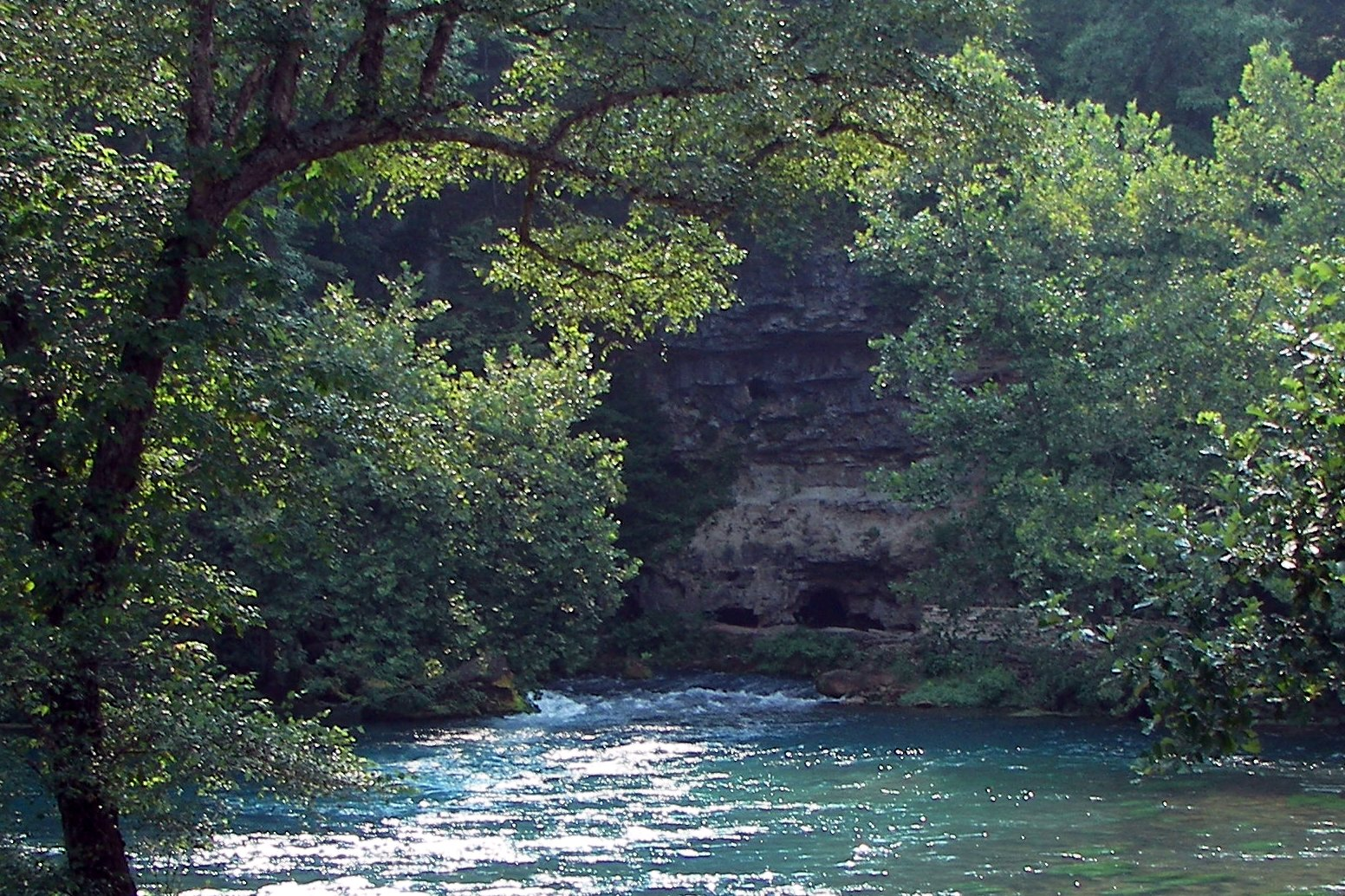
On an average day, nearly 303 million US gallons (1,150,000 m^{3}) of water flow from Big Spring in Missouri at a rate of 469 cubic feet per second (13.3 m^{3}/s).

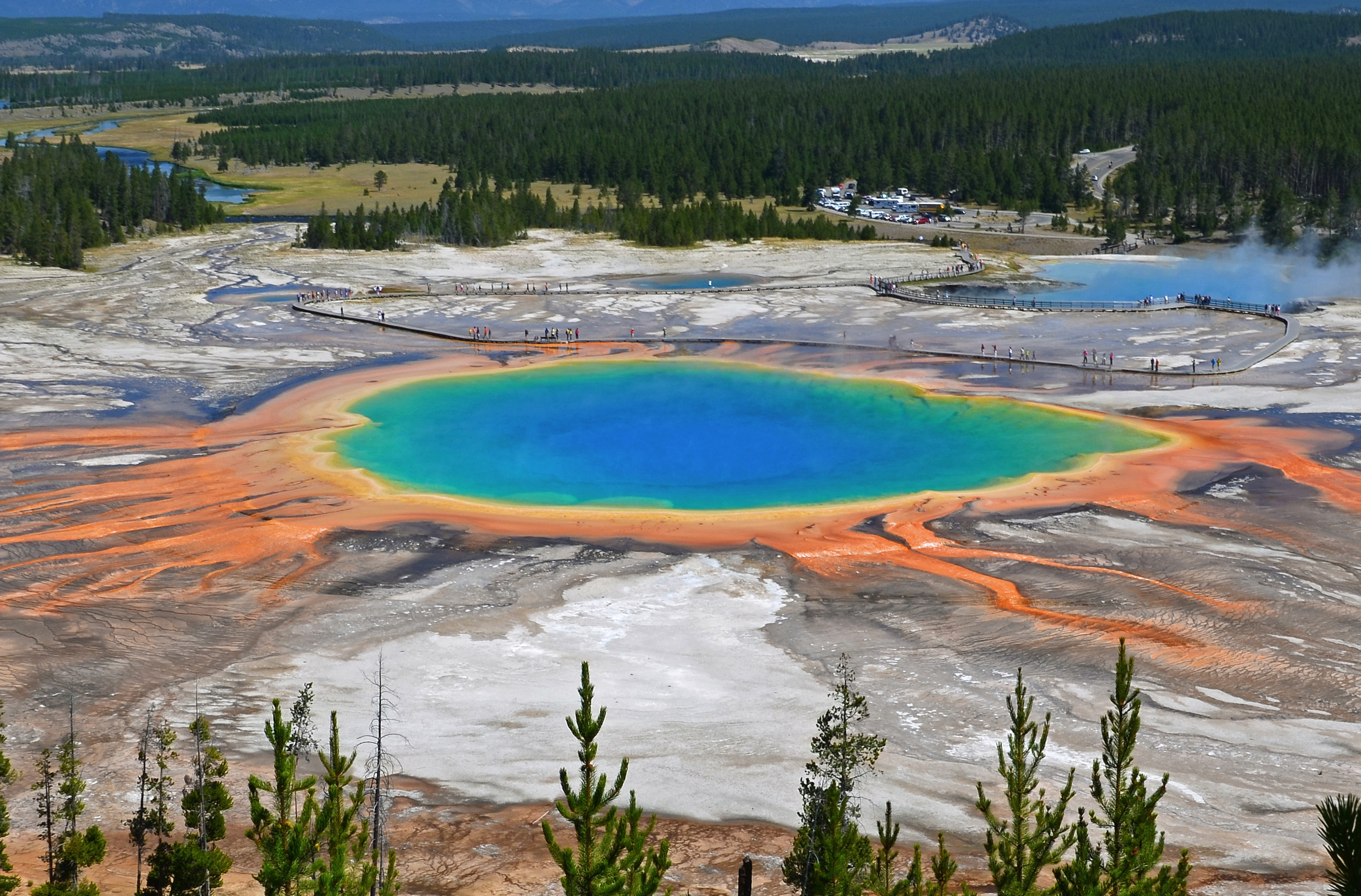
Grand Prismatic Spring, Yellowstone National Park, Wyoming

A spring is a natural exit point at which groundwater emerges from an aquifer and flows across the ground surface as surface water. It is a component of the hydrosphere, as well as a part of the water cycle. Springs have long been important for humans as a source of fresh water, especially in arid regions which have relatively little annual rainfall.

Springs are driven out onto the surface by various natural forces, such as gravity and hydrostatic pressure. A spring produced by the emergence of geothermally heated groundwater is known as a hot spring. The yield of spring water varies widely from a volumetric flow rate of nearly zero to more than 14,000 litres per second (490 cu ft/s) for the biggest springs.

== Formation ==
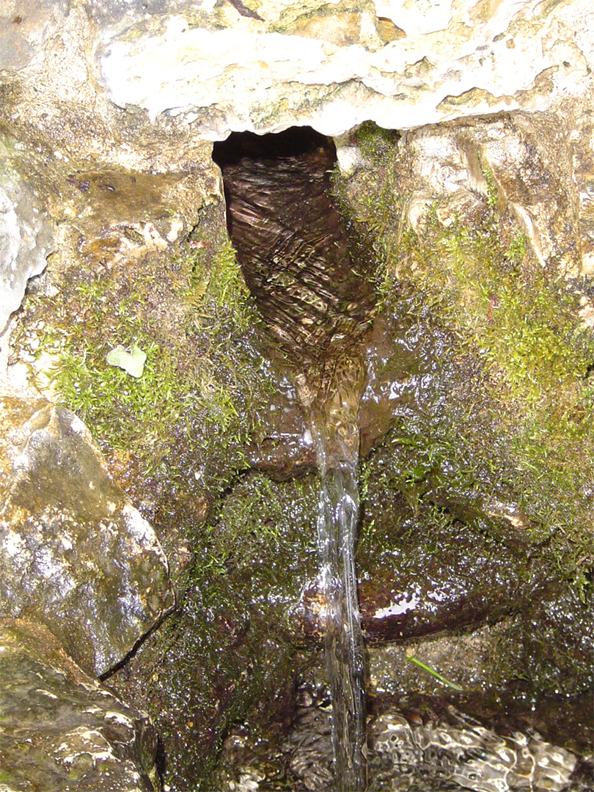
A natural spring on Mackinac Island in Michigan

Springs are formed when groundwater flows onto the surface. This typically happens when the water table reaches above the surface level, or if the terrain depresses sharply. Springs may also be formed as a result of karst topography, aquifers or volcanic activity. Springs have also been observed on the ocean floor, spewing warmer, low-salinity water directly into the ocean.

Springs formed as a result of karst topography create karst springs, in which ground water travels through a network of cracks and fissures—openings ranging from intergranular spaces to large caves, later emerging in a spring.

The forcing of the spring to the surface can be the result of a confined aquifer in which the recharge area of the spring water table rests at a higher elevation than that of the outlet. Spring water forced to the surface by elevated sources are artesian wells. This is possible even if the outlet is in the form of a 300-foot-deep (91 m) cave. In this case the cave is used like a hose by the higher elevated recharge area of groundwater to exit through the lower elevation opening.

Non-artesian springs may simply flow from a higher elevation through the earth to a lower elevation and exit in the form of a spring, using the ground like a drainage pipe. Still other springs are the result of pressure from an underground source in the earth, in the form of volcanic or magma activity. The result can be water at elevated temperature and pressure, i.e. hot springs and geysers.

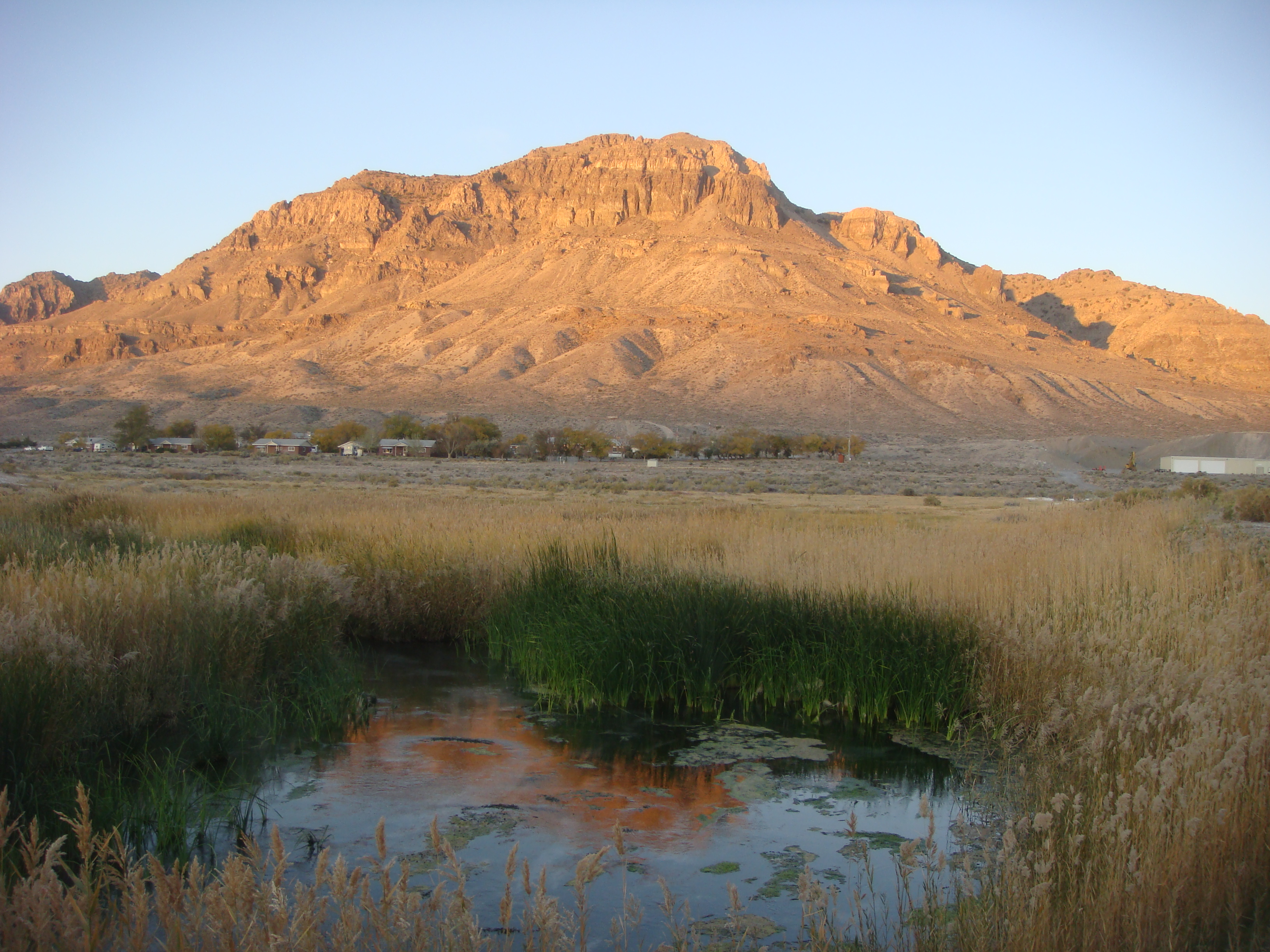
Sunrise at Middle Spring, Fish Springs National Wildlife Refuge, Utah

The action of the groundwater continually dissolves permeable bedrock such as limestone and dolomite, creating vast cave systems.

=== Types ===
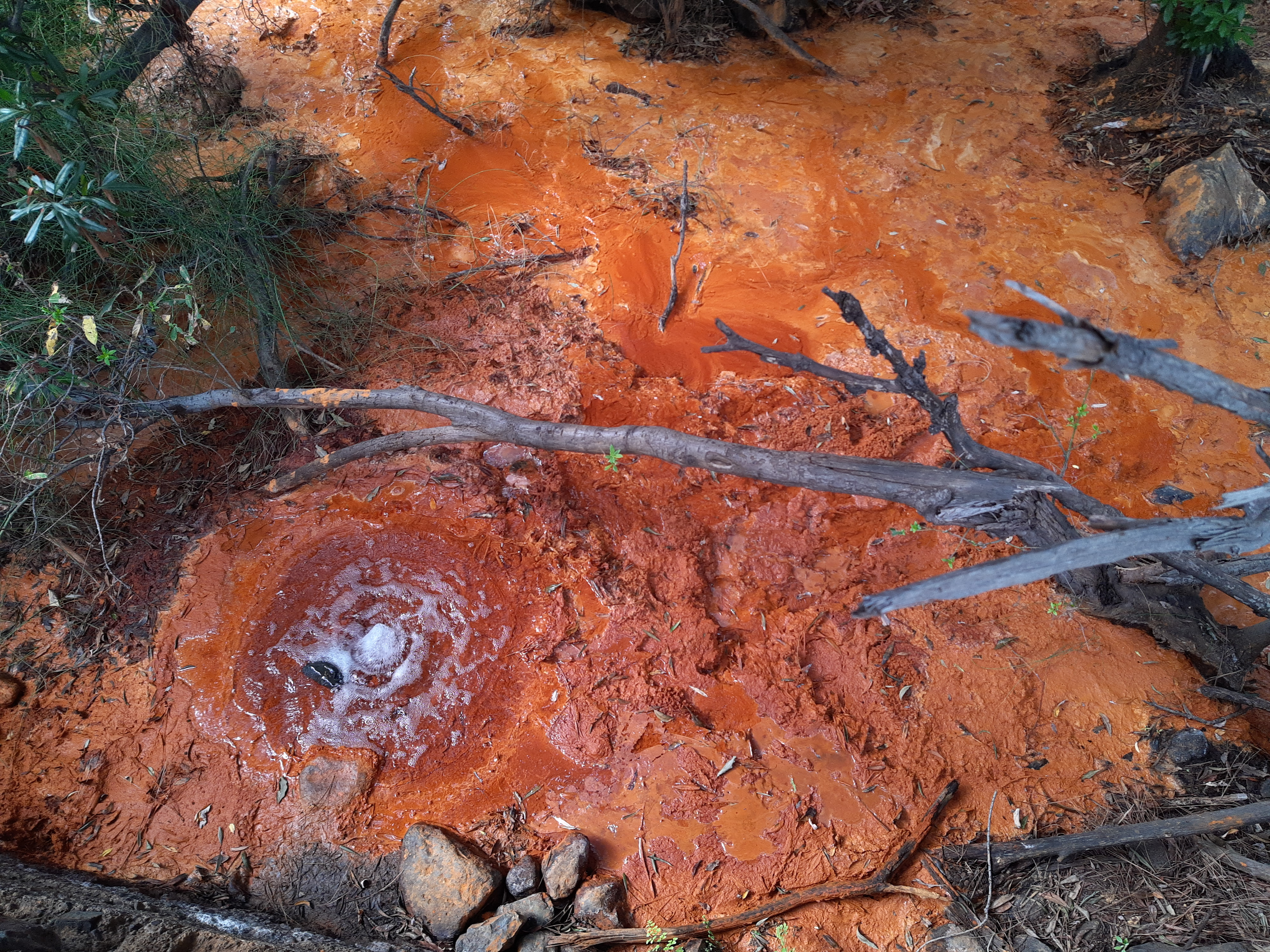
Chalybeate spring below Cascada de los Colores, La Palma

- Depression springs occur along a depression, such as the bottom of alluvial valleys, basins, or valleys made of highly permeable materials.
- Contact springs, which occur along the side of a hill or mountain, are created when the groundwater is underlaid by an impermeable layer of rock or soil known as an aquiclude or aquifuge
- Fracture, or joint occur when groundwater running along an impermeable layer of rock meets a crack (fracture) or joint in the rock.
- Tubular springs occur when groundwater flows from circular fissures such as those found in caverns (solution tubular springs) or lava tubular springs found in lava tube caves.
- Artesian springs typically occur at the lowest point in a given area. An artesian spring is created when the pressure for the groundwater becomes greater than the pressure from the atmosphere. In this case the water is pushed straight up out of the ground.
- Wonky holes are freshwater submarine exit points for coral and sediment-covered, sediment-filled old river channels.
- Karst springs occur as outflows of groundwater that are part of a karst hydrological system.
- Thermal springs are heated by geothermal activity; they have a water temperature significantly higher than the mean air temperature of the surrounding area. Geysers are a type of hot spring where steam is created underground by trapped superheated groundwater resulting in recurring eruptions of hot water and steam.
- Carbonated springs, such as Soda Springs Geyser, are springs that emit naturally occurring carbonated water, due to dissolved carbon dioxide in the water content. They are sometimes called boiling springs or bubbling springs.
- "Gushette springs pour from cliff faces"
- Helocrene springs are diffuse that sustain marshlands with groundwater.

== Flow ==
Drone video of Aegviidu blue springs in Estonia

Spring discharge, or resurgence, is determined by the spring's recharge basin. Factors that affect the recharge include the size of the area in which groundwater is captured, the amount of precipitation, the size of capture points, and the size of the spring outlet. Water may leak into the underground system from many sources including permeable earth, sinkholes, and losing streams. In some cases entire creeks seemingly disappear as the water sinks into the ground via the stream bed. Grand Gulf State Park in Missouri is an example of an entire creek vanishing into the groundwater system. The water emerges 9 miles (14 km) away, forming some of the discharge of Mammoth Spring in Arkansas. Human activity may also affect a spring's discharge—withdrawal of groundwater reduces the water pressure in an aquifer, decreasing the volume of flow.

=== Classification ===
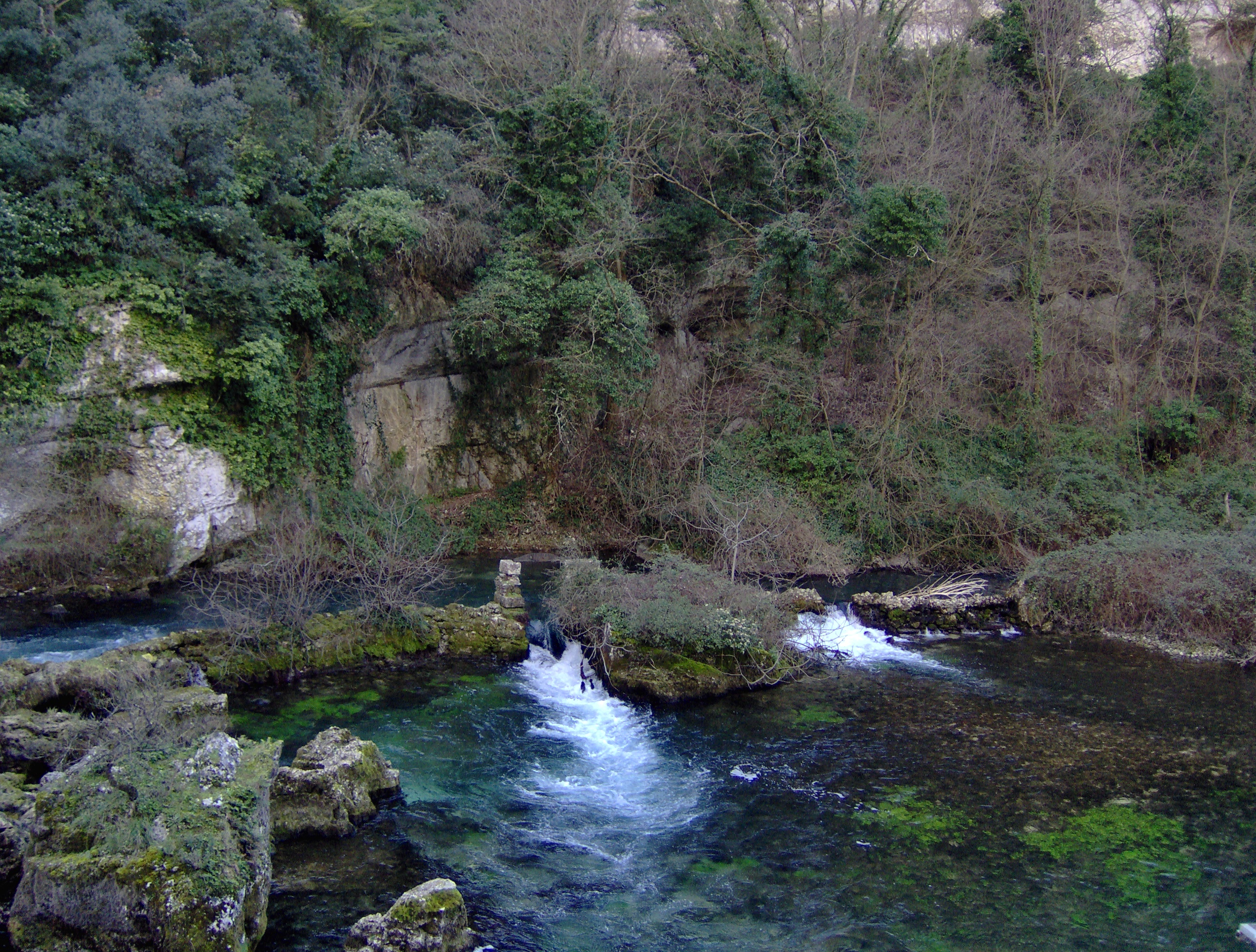
Fontaine de Vaucluse or Spring of Vaucluse in France discharges about 470 million US gallons (1,800,000 m^{3}) of water per day at a rate of 727 ft^{3} (20.6 m^{3}) per second.

Springs fall into three general classifications: perennial (springs that flow constantly during the year); intermittent (temporary springs that are active after rainfall, or during certain seasonal changes); and periodic (as in geysers that vent and erupt at regular or irregular intervals).

Springs are often classified by the volume of the water they discharge. The largest springs are called "first-magnitude", defined as springs that discharge water at a rate of at least 2800 liters or 100 cubic feet (2.8 m^{3}) of water per second. Some locations contain many first-magnitude springs, such as Florida where there are at least 27 known to be that size; the Missouri and Arkansas Ozarks, which contain 10 known of first-magnitude; and 11 more in the Thousand Springs area along the Snake River in Idaho. The scale for spring flow is as follows:

Magnitude	Flow (ft^{3}/s, gal/min, pint/min)	Flow (L/s)
1st magnitude	> 100 ft^{3}/s	2800 L/s
2nd magnitude	10 to 100 ft^{3}/s	280 to 2800 L/s
3rd magnitude	1 to 10 ft^{3}/s	28 to 280 L/s
4th magnitude	100 US gal/min to 1 ft^{3}/s (448 US gal/min)	6.3 to 28 L/s
5th magnitude	10 to 100 gal/min	0.63 to 6.3 L/s
6th magnitude	1 to 10 gal/min	63 to 630 mL/s
7th magnitude	1 pint to 1 gal/min	8 to 63 mL/s
8th magnitude	Less than 1 pint/min	8 mL/s
0 magnitude	no flow (sites of past/historic flow)	

== Water content ==
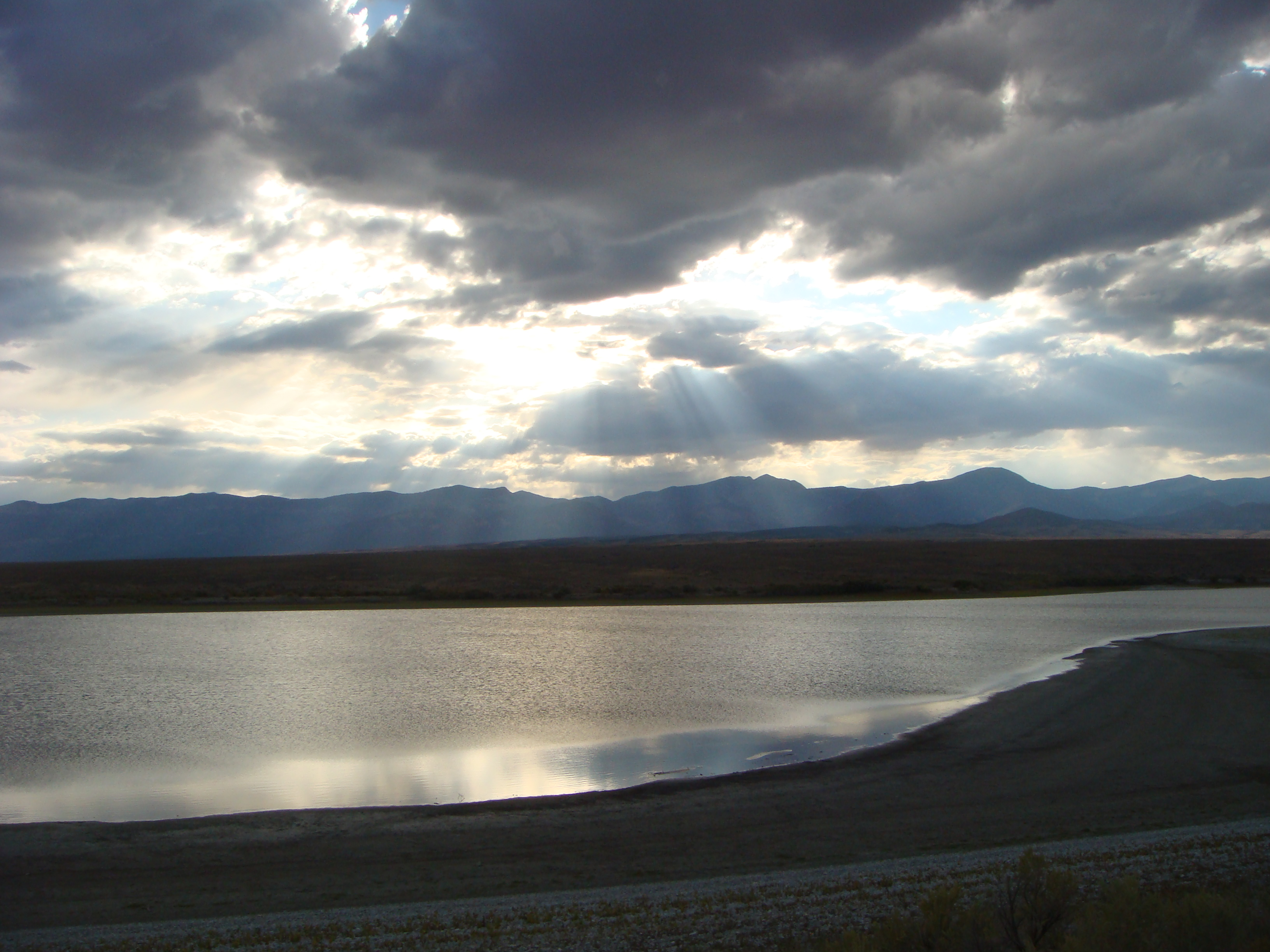
Pruess Lake is spring-fed in the arid Snake Valley of Utah.

Minerals become dissolved in the water as it moves through the underground rocks. This mineral content is measured as total dissolved solids (TDS). This may give the water flavour and even carbon dioxide bubbles, depending on the nature of the geology through which it passes. This is why spring water is often bottled and sold as mineral water, although the term is often the subject of deceptive advertising. Mineral water contains no less than 250 parts per million (ppm) of tds. Springs that contain significant amounts of minerals are sometimes called 'mineral springs'. (Springs without such mineral content, meanwhile, are sometimes distinguished as 'sweet springs'.) Springs that contain large amounts of dissolved sodium salts, mostly sodium carbonate, are called 'soda springs'. Many resorts have developed around mineral springs and are known as spa towns. Mineral springs are alleged to have healing properties. Soaking in them is said to result in the absorption of the minerals from the water. Some springs contain arsenic levels that exceed the 10 ppb World Health Organization (WHO) standard for drinking water. Where such springs feed rivers they can also raise the arsenic levels in the rivers above WHO limits.

Water from springs is usually clear. However, some springs may be coloured by the minerals that are dissolved in the water. For instance, water heavy with iron or tannins will have an orange colour.

In parts of the United States a stream carrying the outflow of a spring to a nearby primary stream may be called a spring branch, spring creek, or run. Groundwater tends to maintain a relatively long-term average temperature of its aquifer; so flow from a spring may be cooler than other sources on a summer day, but remain unfrozen in the winter. The cool water of a spring and its branch may harbor species such as certain trout that are otherwise ill-suited to a warmer local climate.

=== Types of mineral springs ===
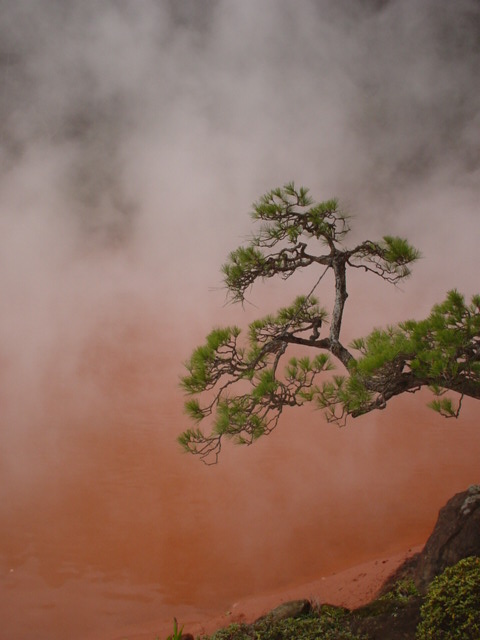
Natural iron hot spring in Beppu, Japan

- Sulfur springs contain a high level of dissolved sulfur or hydrogen sulfide in the water. Historically they have been used to alleviate the symptoms of arthritis and other inflammatory diseases.
- Borax springs
- Gypsum springs
- Saline springs
- Iron springs (chalybeate spring)
- Radium springs (or radioactive springs) have a detectable level of radiation produced by the natural radioactive decay process

== Uses ==
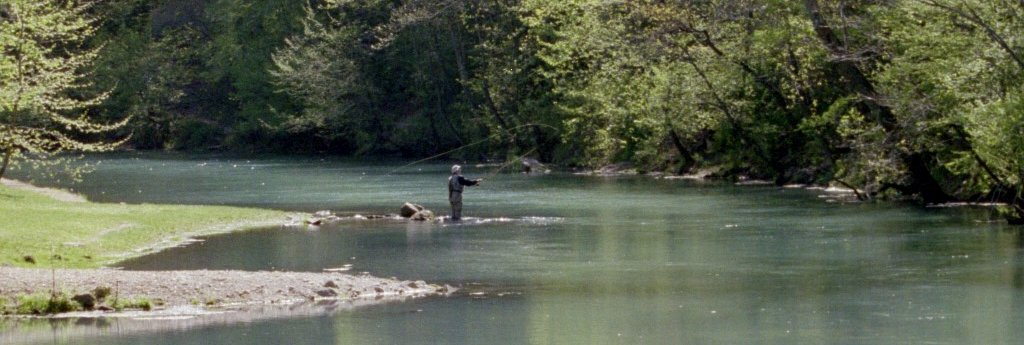
Trout fishing on Maramec Spring in Missouri

Springs have been used for a variety of human needs - including drinking water, domestic water supply, irrigation, mills, navigation, and electricity generation. Modern uses include recreational activities such as fishing, swimming, and floating; therapy; water for livestock; fish hatcheries; and supply for bottled mineral water or bottled spring water. Springs have taken on a kind of mythic quality in that some people falsely believe that springs are always healthy sources of drinking water. They may or may not be. One must take a comprehensive water quality test to know how to use a spring appropriately, whether for a mineral bath or drinking water. Springs that are managed as spas will already have such a test.

=== Drinking water ===
Springs are often used as sources for bottled water. When purchasing bottled water labeled as spring water one can often find the water test for that spring on the website of the company selling it.

=== Irrigation ===
Springs have been used as sources of water for gravity-fed irrigation of crops. Indigenous people of the American Southwest built spring-fed acequias that directed water to fields through canals. The Spanish missionaries later used this method.

=== Sacred springs ===
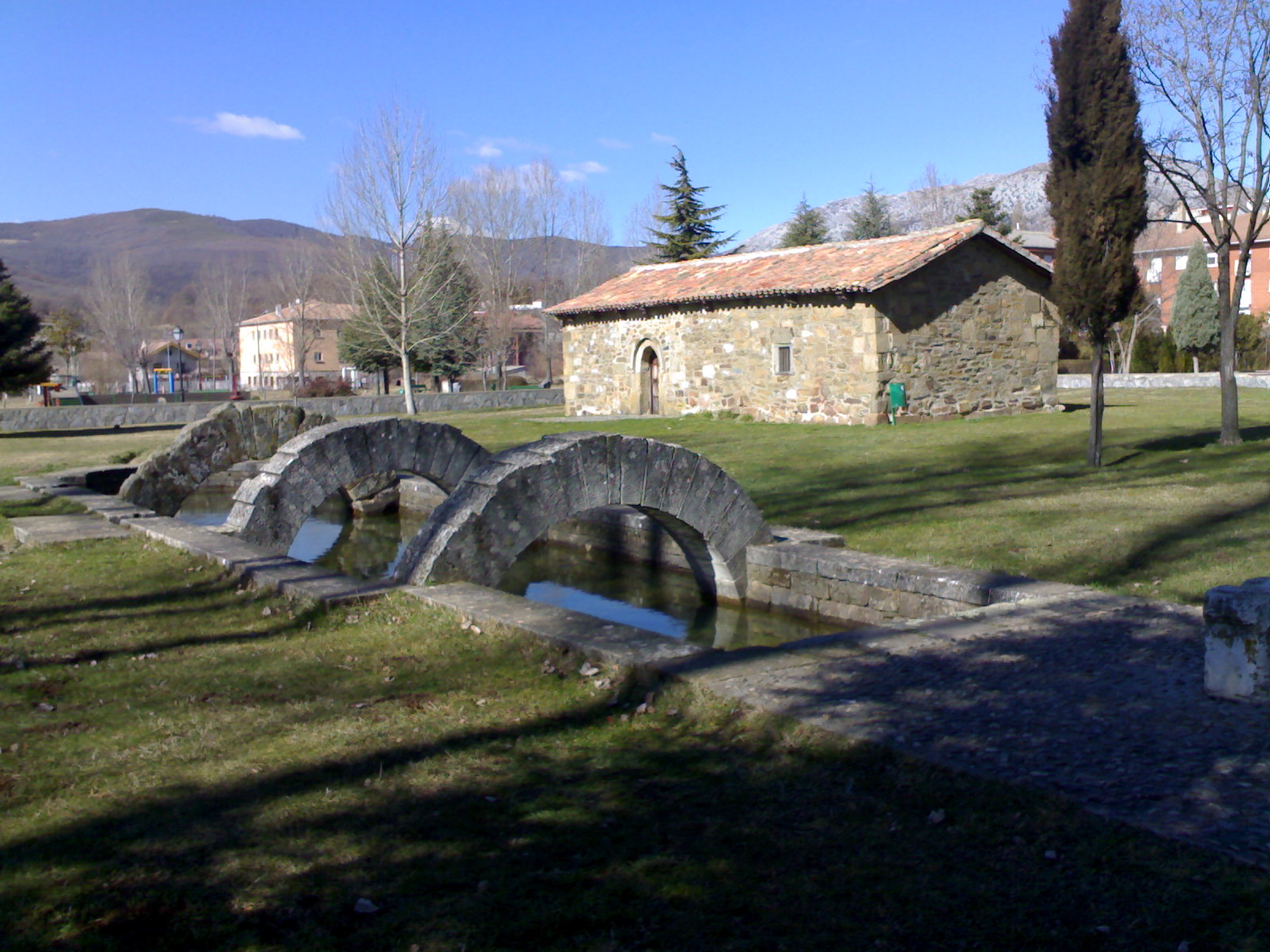
Fontes Tamarici, in Spain

A sacred spring, or holy well, is a small body of water emerging from underground and revered in some religious context: Christian and/or pagan and/or other. The lore and mythology of ancient Greece was replete with sacred and storied springs—notably, the Corycian, Pierian and Castalian springs. In medieval Europe, pagan sacred sites frequently became Christianized as holy wells. The term "holy well" is commonly employed to refer to any water source of limited size (i.e., not a lake or river, but including pools and natural springs and seeps), which has some significance in local folklore. This can take the form of a particular name, an associated legend, the attribution of healing qualities to the water through the numinous presence of its guardian spirit or of a Christian saint, or a ceremony or ritual centered on the well site. Christian legends often recount how the action of a saint caused a spring's water to flow - a familiar theme, especially in the hagiography of Celtic saints.

=== Thermal springs ===
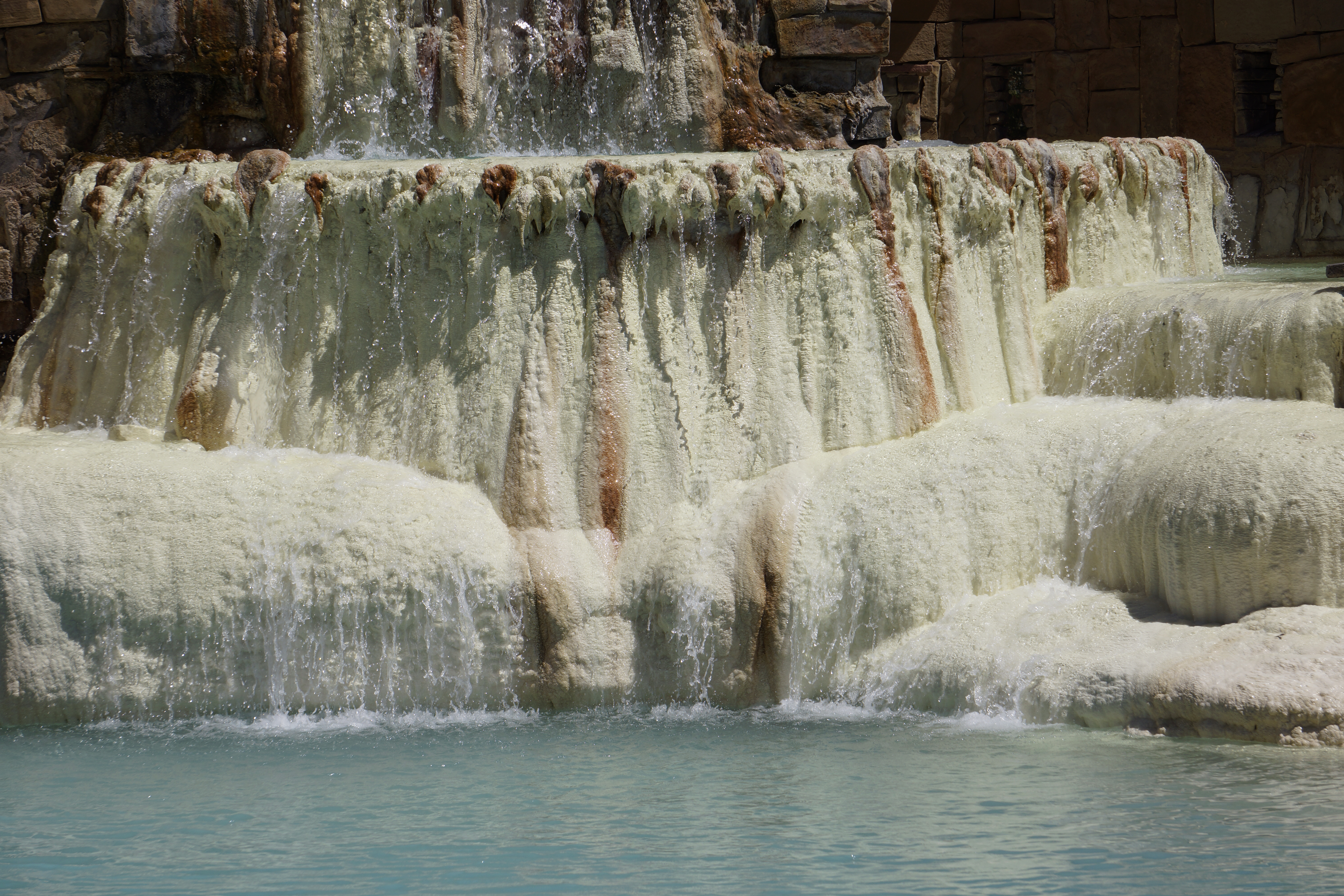
The Mother Spring, Pagosa Hot Springs, Colorado

The geothermally heated groundwater that flows from thermal springs is greater than human body temperature, usually in the range of 45–50 °C (113–122 °F), but they can be hotter. Those springs with water cooler than body temperature but warmer than air temperature are sometimes referred to as warm springs.

==== Bathing and balneotherapy ====
Hot springs or geothermal springs have been used for balneotherapy, bathing, and relaxation for thousands of years. Because of the folklore surrounding hot springs and their claimed medical value, some have become tourist destinations and locations of physical rehabilitation centers.

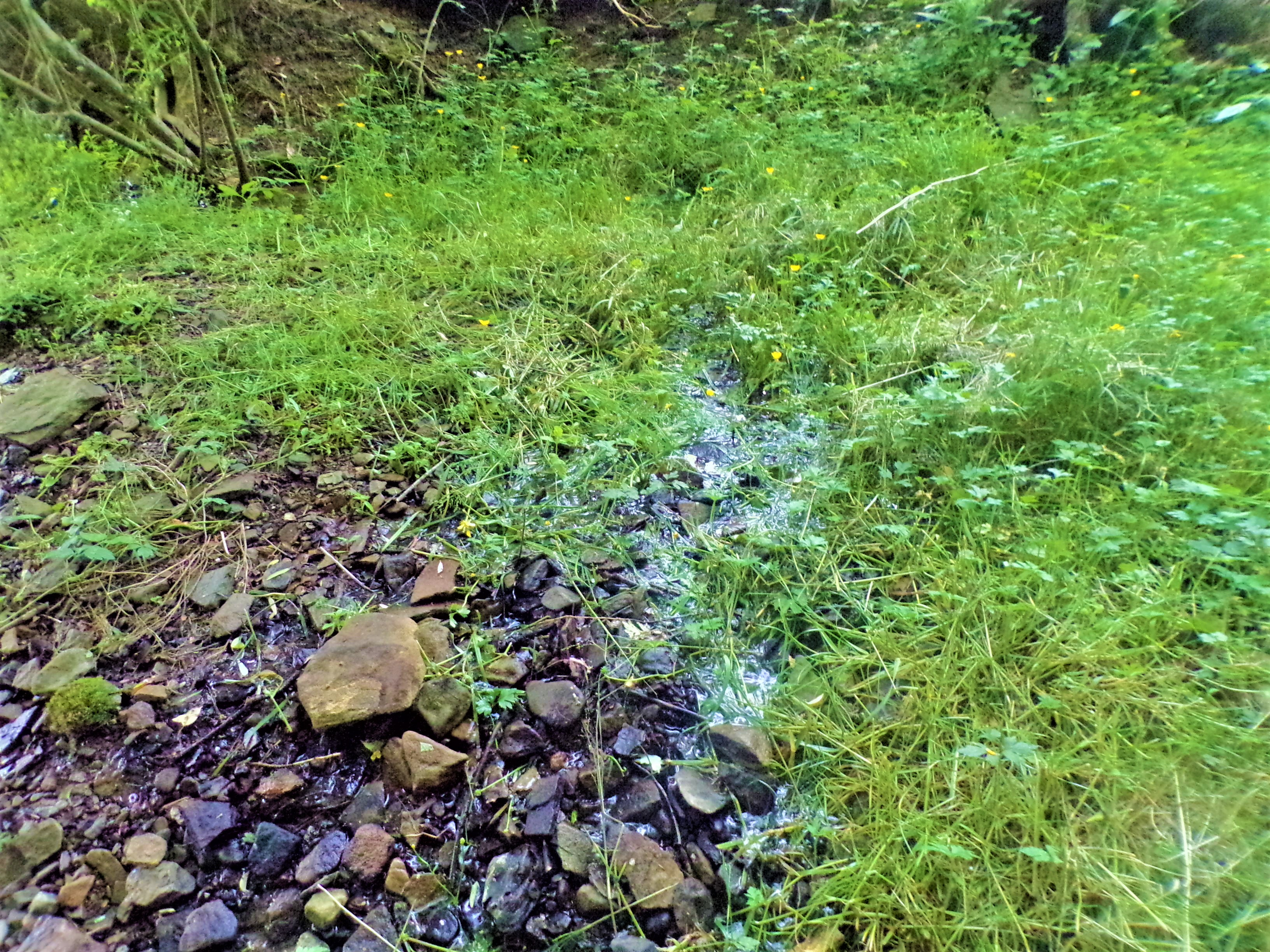
Natural spring in Pennsylvania where surface discharge emerges, then runs off, down and through surface grass and rocks

==== Geothermal energy ====
Hot springs have been used as a heat source for thousands of years. In the 20th century, they became a renewable resource of geothermal energy for heating homes and buildings. The city of Beppu, Japan contains 2,217 hot spring well heads that provide the city with hot water. Hot springs have also been used as a source of sustainable energy for greenhouse cultivation and the growing of crops and flowers.

== Terminology ==
- Spring boil
- Spring pool
- Spring runs also called rheocrene springs
- Spring vent

== Cultural representations ==
Springs have been represented in culture through art, mythology, and folklore throughout history. The Fountain of Youth is a mythical spring which was said to restore youth to anyone who drank from it. It has been claimed that the fountain is located in St. Augustine, Florida, and was discovered by Juan Ponce de León in 1513. However, it has not demonstrated the power to restore youth, and most historians dispute the veracity of Ponce de León's discovery.

Pythia, also known as the Oracle at Delphi, was the high priestess of the Temple of Apollo. She delivered prophesies in a frenzied state of divine possession that were "induced by vapours rising from a chasm in the rock". It is believed that the vapors were emitted from the Kerna spring at Delphi.

The Greek myth of Narcissus describes a young man who fell in love with his reflection in the still pool of a spring. Narcissus gazed into "an unmuddied spring, silvery from its glittering waters, which neither shepherds nor she-goats grazing on the mountain nor any other cattle had touched, which neither bird nor beast nor branch fallen from a tree had disturbed." (Ovid)

The early 20th century American photographer, James Reuel Smith created a comprehensive series of photographs documenting the historical springs of New York City before they were capped by the city after the advent of the municipal water system. Smith later photographed springs in Europe leading to his book, Springs and Wells in Greek and Roman Literature, Their Legends and Locations (1922).

The 19th century Japanese artists Utagawa Hiroshige and Utagawa Toyokuni III created a series of wood-block prints, Two Artists Tour the Seven Hot Springs (Sōhitsu shichitō meguri) in 1854.

The Chinese city Jinan is known as "a City of Springs" (Chinese: 泉城), because of its 72 spring attractions and numerous micro spring holes spread over the city centre.

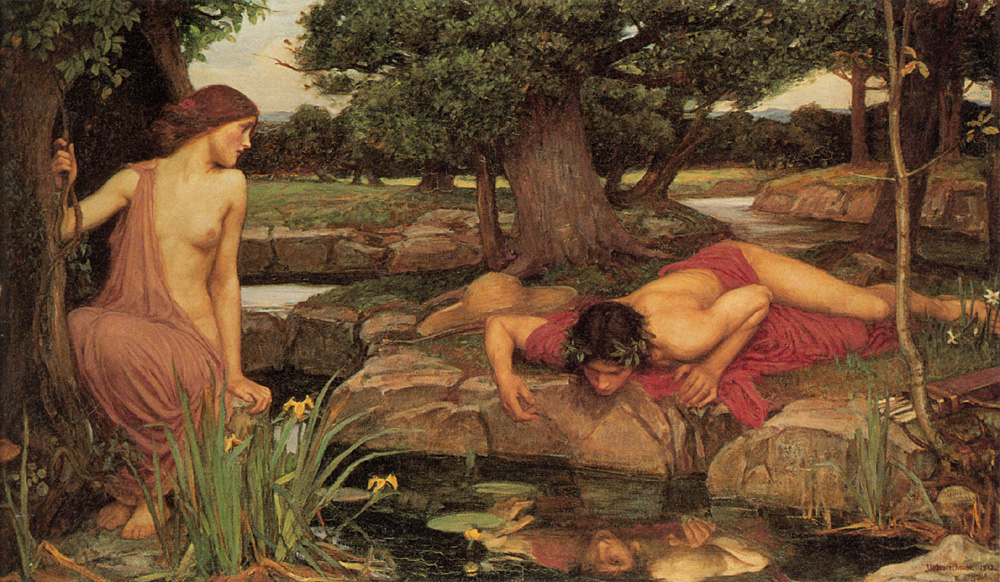
John William Waterhouse Echo And Narcissus, 1903

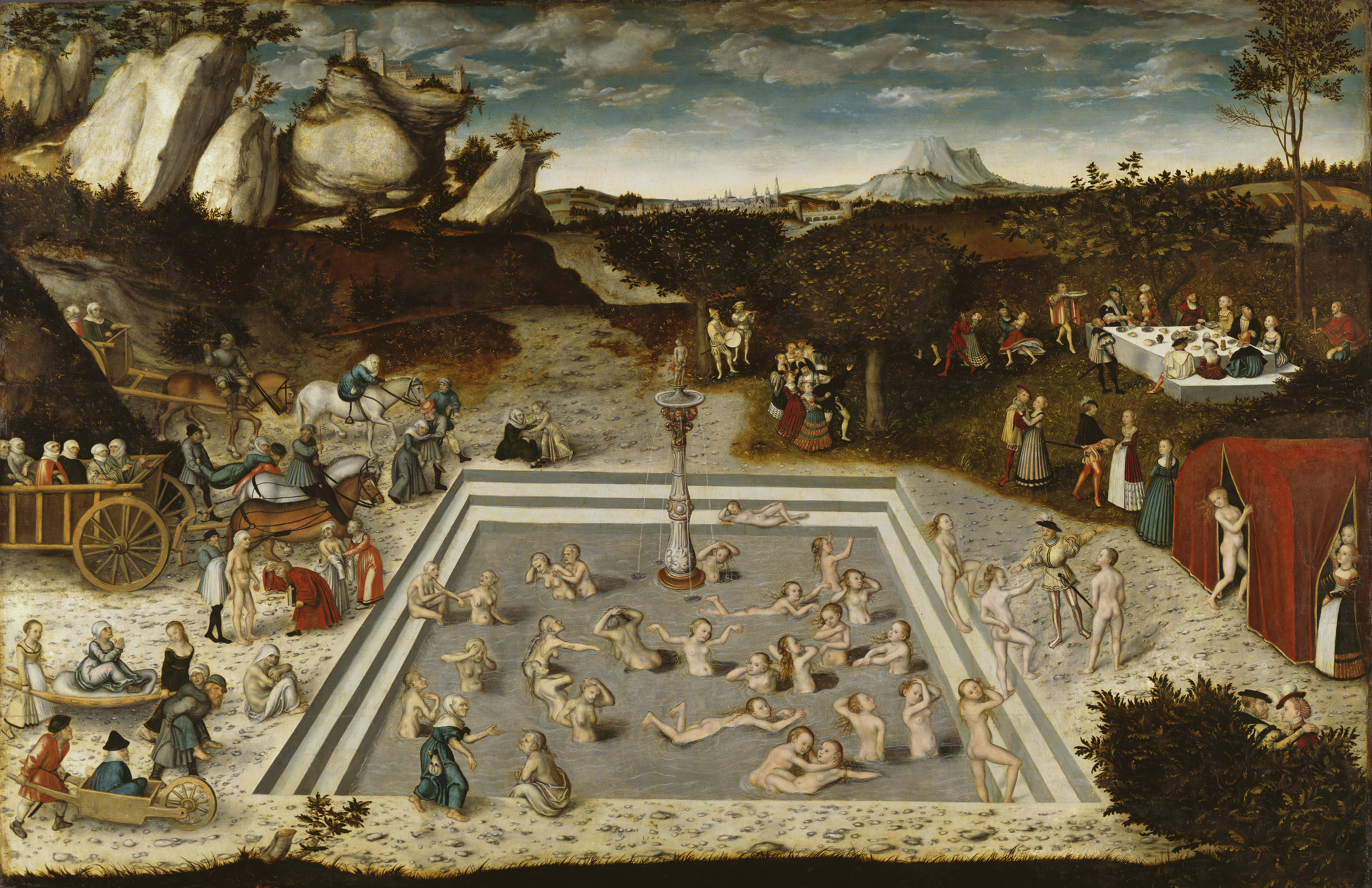
Lucas Cranach, Der Jungbrunnen (Fountain of Youth), 1546

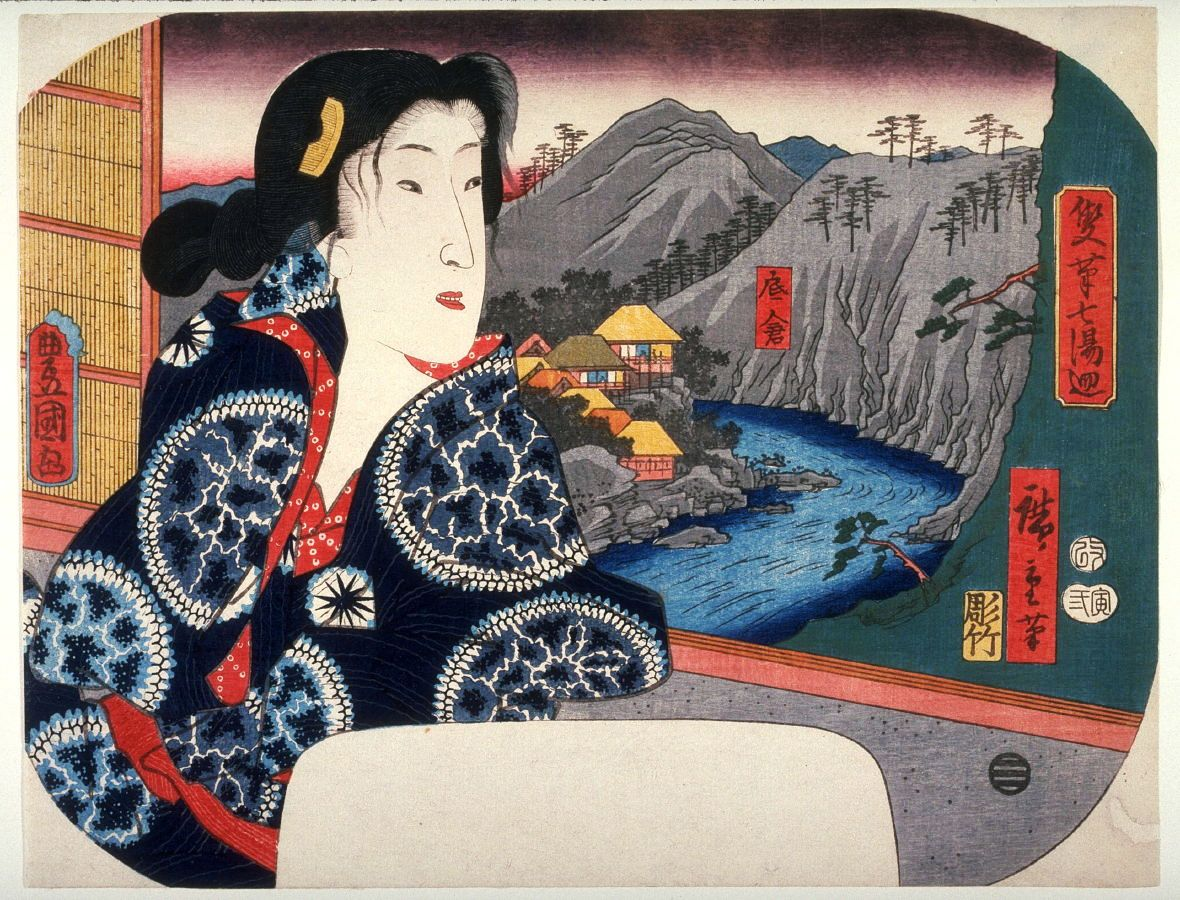
Sokokura, from the series Two Artists Tour the Seven Hot Springs (Sōhitsu shichitō meguri) by Utagawa Toyokuni III and Utagawa Hiroshige, 1854

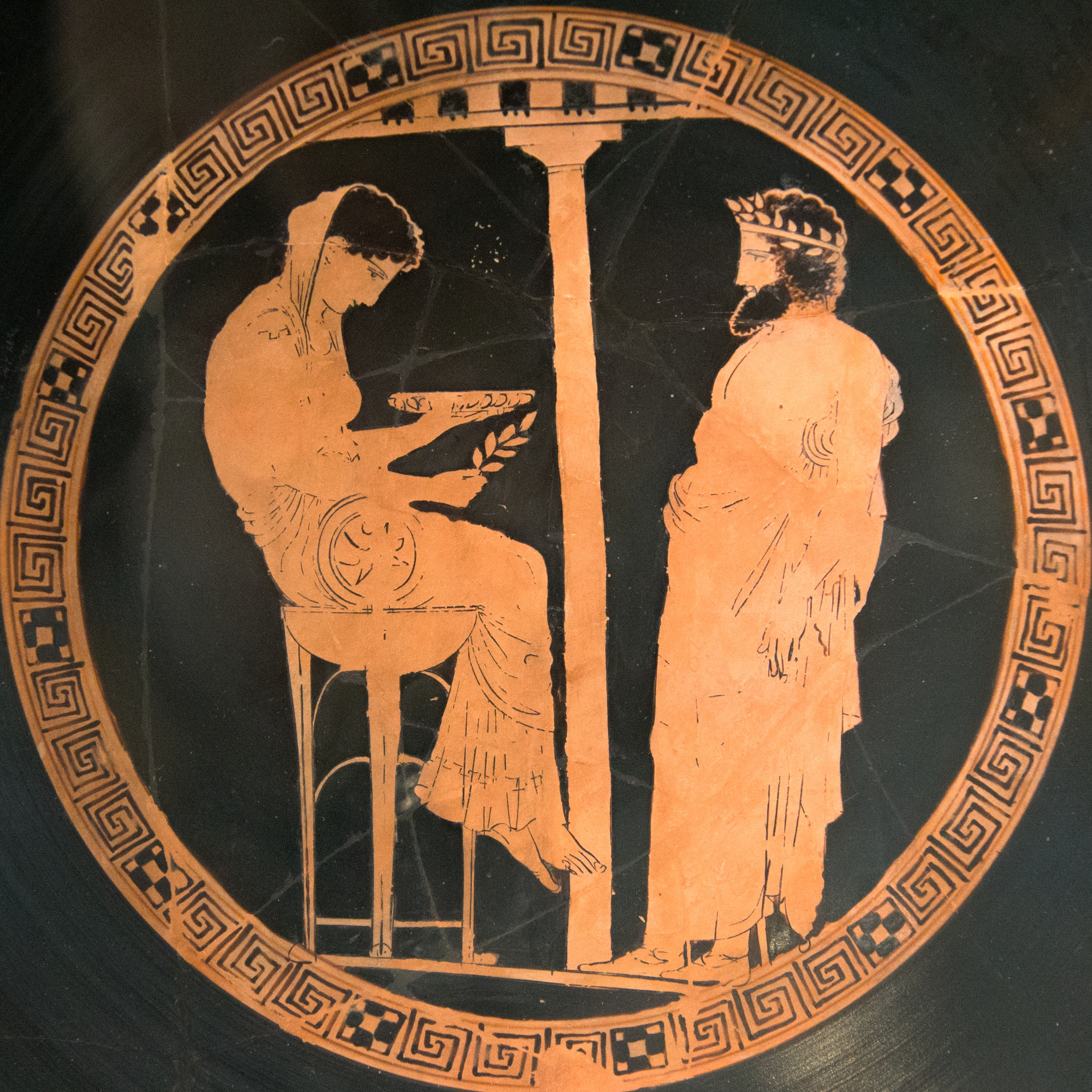
Oracle of Delphi, red-figure kylix, Kodros Painter, depicting Pythia with a cup presumably holding water from a spring, 440–430 BC

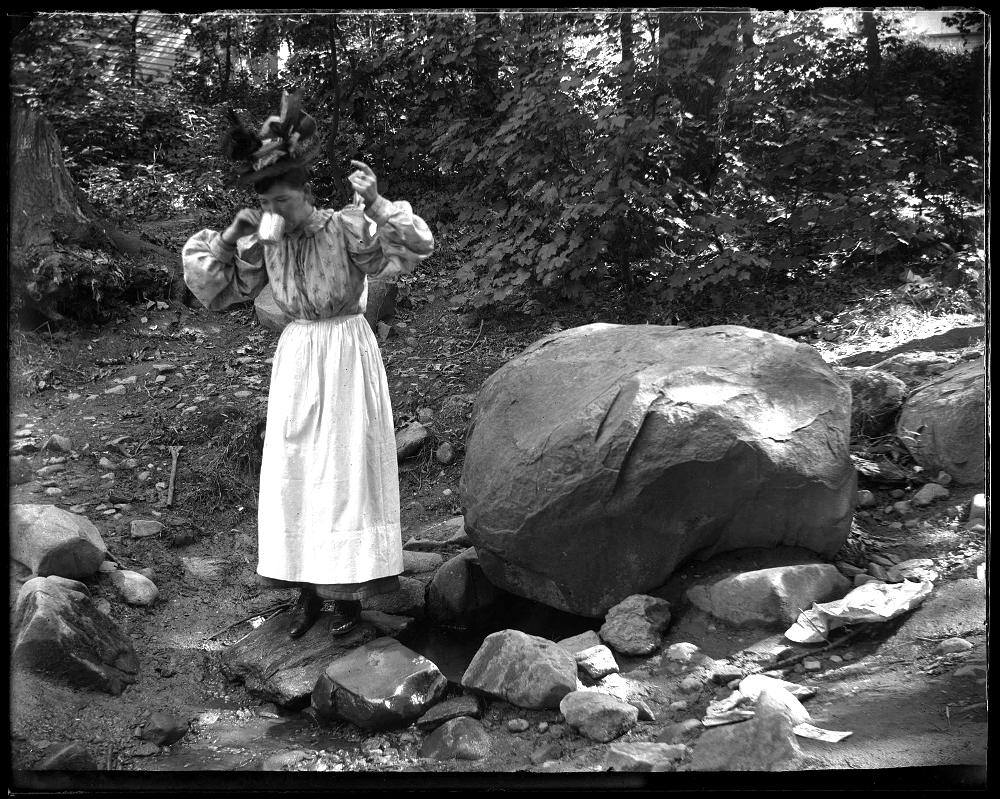
A Woman Drinks at the Carmen Spring, on West 175th Street and Amsterdam Avenue, New York City, by James Reuel Smith, c. 1897–1902

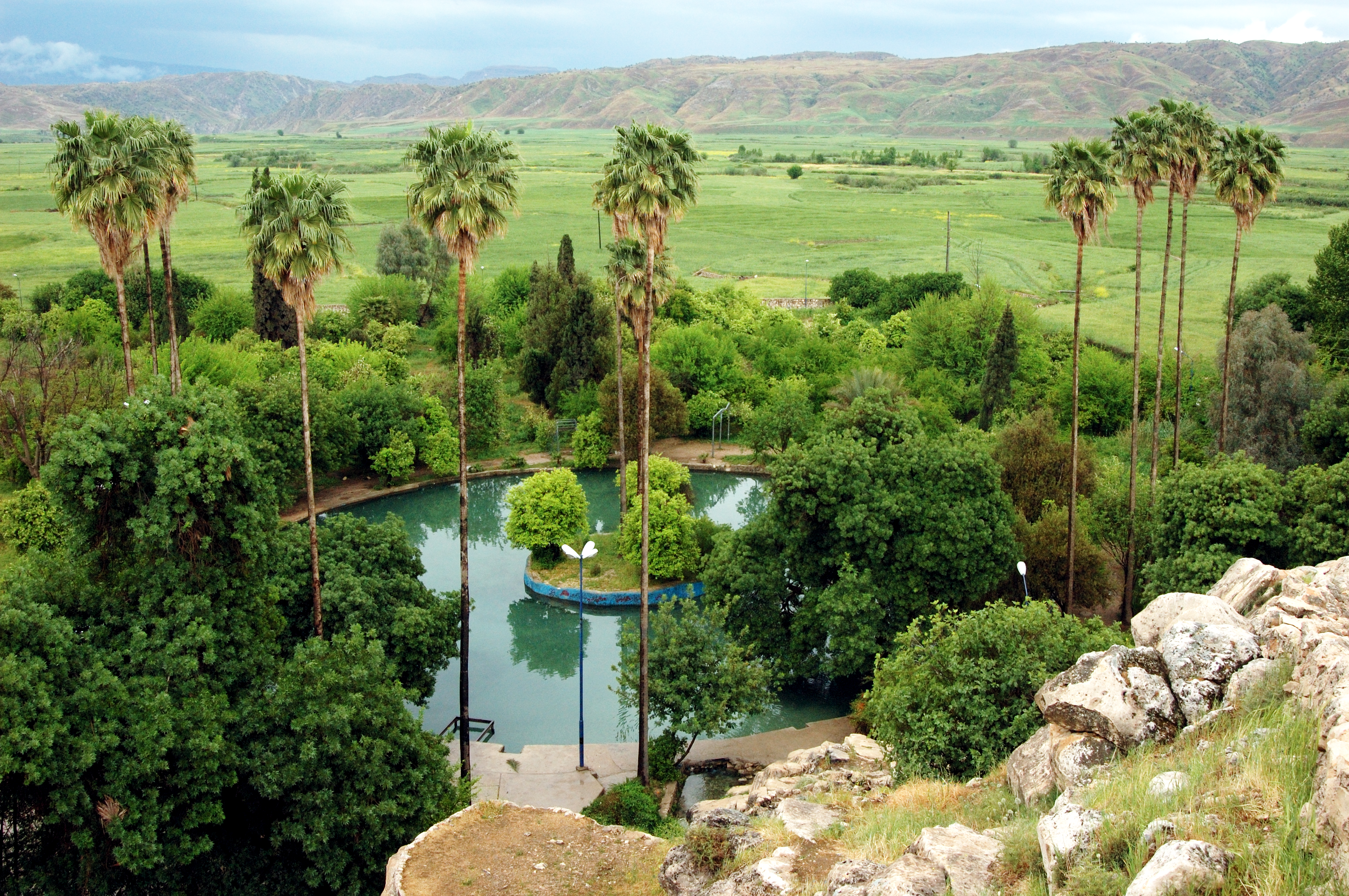
Belqais Spring Garden, Charam, Iran, is a Persian garden where all the water sources are springs located within it.
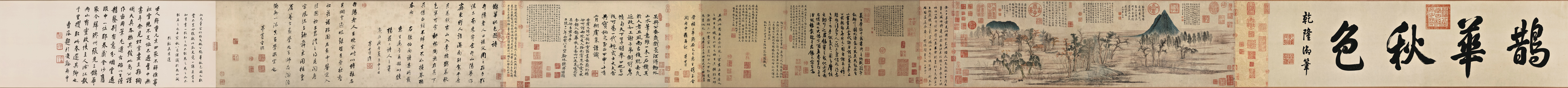
Que Hua Qiu Se Tu, depicting the view of springs and mountains in Jinan, by Zhao Mengfu, Song Dynasty (Chinese:鹊华秋色图)

== See also ==
- Fountain
- List of spa towns
- Oasis
- Petroleum seep
- Brook
- Soakage
- Spring line settlement
- Spring supply
- Water cycle
- Well
