= Deh Bal =

Deh Bal ده بال
- Village
- Location within Iran
- Coordinates: 30°34′15″N 51°01′47″E
- Country: Iran
- Province: Kohgiluyeh and Boyer-Ahmad
- County: Charam
- Bakhsh: Central
- Rural District: Charam

Population (2006)
  - Total: 23
- Time zone: UTC+3:30 (IRST)
  - Summer (DST): UTC+4:30 (IRDT)

Deh Bal (Persian: ده بال, also romanized as Deh Bāl; also known as Vardeh) is a small village in Charam Rural District, in the Central District of Charam County, Kohgiluyeh and Boyer-Ahmad Province, Iran. At the 2006 census, its population was 23, in 4 families.
