= Alqchin-e Sofla =

Alqchin-e Sofla القچین سفلی
- Village
- Location within Iran
- Coordinates: 30°45′42″N 50°43′35″E
- Country: Iran
- Province: Kohgiluyeh and Boyer-Ahmad
- County: Charam
- Bakhsh: Central
- Rural District: Alqchin

Population (2006)
  - Total: 800
- Time zone: UTC+3:30 (IRST)
  - Summer (DST): UTC+4:30 (IRDT)

Alqchin-e Sofla (Persian: القچین سفلی, also Romanized as Alqchīn-e Soflá; also known as Alqchīn-e Pā’īn) is a village in Alqchin Rural District, in the Central District of Charam County, Kohgiluyeh and Boyer-Ahmad Province, Iran. At the 2006 census, its population was 800, in 155 families.
