= Bonari-ye Sofla =

Bonari-ye Sofla بناري سفلي
- Village
- Location within Iran
- Coordinates: 30°41′47″N 50°46′58″E
- Country: Iran
- Province: Kohgiluyeh and Boyer-Ahmad
- County: Charam
- Bakhsh: Central
- Rural District: Charam

Population (2006)
  - Total: 309
- Time zone: UTC+3:30 (IRST)
  - Summer (DST): UTC+4:30 (IRDT)

Bonari-ye Sofla (Persian: بناري سفلي, also Romanized as Bonārī-ye Soflá; also known as Banārī-ye Pā’īn, Benārī-ye Pa’īn, Bonārī, and Bonārī-ye Pā’īn) is a village in Charam Rural District, in the Central District of Charam County, Kohgiluyeh and Boyer-Ahmad Province, Iran. At the 2006 census, its population was 309, in 64 families.
