= Bonari-ye Olya =

Bonari-ye Olya بناري عليا
- Village
- Location within Iran
- Coordinates: 30°41′20″N 50°47′43″E
- Country: Iran
- Province: Kohgiluyeh and Boyer-Ahmad
- County: Charam
- Bakhsh: Central
- Rural District: Charam

Population (2006)
  - Total: 322
- Time zone: UTC+3:30 (IRST)
  - Summer (DST): UTC+4:30 (IRDT)

The Iranian village of Bonari-ye Olya (Persian: بناري عليا, also Romanized as Bonārī-ye ‘Olyā; also known as Banārī-ye Bālā, Benāri-ye Bālā, and Bonārī-ye Bālā) is located in Charam Rural District, in the Central District of Charam County, Kohgiluyeh and Boyer-Ahmad Province. At the 2006 census, its population was 322, in 56 families.
