= Neyab =

Neyab (Persian: نياب) is the name of the following villages in Iran:

- Neyab, North Khorasan
- Neyab, South Khorasan

== See also ==
- Neyab-e Ab Kenaru, Kohgiluyeh and Boyer-Ahmad Province, Iran, a village
