= Bardian =

Bardian (Persian: برديان) may refer to:

- Bardian, Kohgiluyeh and Boyer-Ahmad
- Bardian, West Azerbaijan
