= Neyab-e Ab Kenaru =

Neyab-e Ab Kenaru نياب اب كنارو
- Village
- Country: Iran
- Province: Kohgiluyeh and Boyer-Ahmad
- County: Charam
- Bakhsh: Central
- Rural District: Charam

Population (2006)
  - Total: 36
- Time zone: UTC+3:30 (IRST)
  - Summer (DST): UTC+4:30 (IRDT)

Neyab-e Ab Kenaru (Persian: نياب اب كنارو, also Romanized as Neyāb-e Āb Kenārū) is a village in Charam Rural District, in the Central District of Charam County, Kohgiluyeh and Boyer-Ahmad Province, Iran. At the 2006 census, its population was 36, in 6 families.
