= Sheykh Hoseyn, Kohgiluyeh and Boyer-Ahmad =

Sheykh Hoseyn شيخ حسين
- Village
- Location within Iran
- Coordinates: 30°47′02″N 50°44′49″E
- Country: Iran
- Province: Kohgiluyeh and Boyer-Ahmad
- County: Charam
- Bakhsh: Central
- Rural District: Alqchin

Population (2006)
  - Total: 664
- Time zone: UTC+3:30 (IRST)
  - Summer (DST): UTC+4:30 (IRDT)

Sheykh Hoseyn (Persian: شيخ حسين, also Romanized as Sheykh Ḩoseyn) is a village in Alqchin Rural District, in the Central District of Charam County, Kohgiluyeh and Boyer-Ahmad Province, Iran. At the 2006 census, its population was 664, in 127 families.
