= Dom Darreh =

Dom Darreh (Persian: دم دره) may refer to:

- Dom Darreh, Kohgiluyeh and Boyer-Ahmad
- Dom Darreh, Lorestan
