= Karreh Shahbazi =

Village in Kohgiluyeh and Boyer-Ahmad province, Iran

Karreh Shahbazi Persian: كره شهبازي
- Village
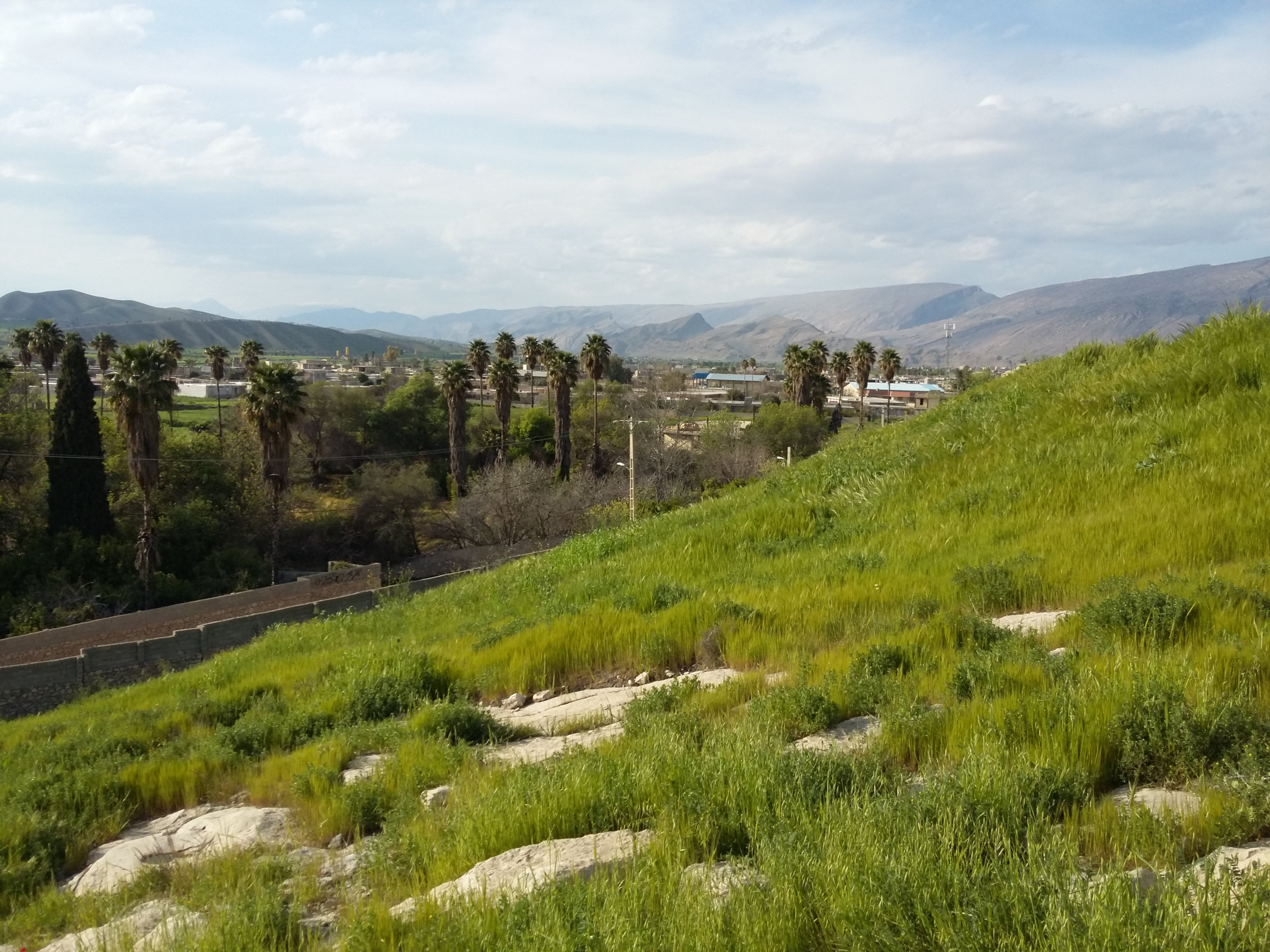

- Location within Iran
- Coordinates: 30°43′43″N 50°44′24″E
- Country: Iran
- Province: Kohgiluyeh and Boyer-Ahmad
- County: Charam
- District: Central
- Rural District: Charam

Population (2016)
  - Total: 2,240
- Time zone: UTC+3:30 (IRST)

Karreh Shahbazi (Persian: كره شهبازي) (Note: Also romanized as Karreh Shahbāzī; also known as Cheshmeh Belqīs, Qal‘eh Kareh, and Shahrak-e Karreh Shahbāzī) is a village in, and the capital of, Charam Rural District of the Central District (Note: Formerly Charam District of Kohgiluyeh County) of Charam County, Kohgiluyeh and Boyer-Ahmad province, Iran.

== Demographics ==
=== Population ===
At the time of the 2006 National Census, the village's population was 2,186 in 406 households, when it was in Charam District (Note: Renamed the Central District of Charam County) of Kohgiluyeh County. The following census in 2011 counted 2,206 people in 510 households, by which time the district had been separated from the county in the establishment of Charam County. The rural district was transferred to the new Central District. The 2016 census measured the population of the village as 2,240 people in 589 households. It was the most populous village in its rural district.
