= Qanbarabad =

Qanbarabad (Persian: قنبراباد) may refer to:

- Qanbarabad, Alborz
- Qanbarabad, Kohgiluyeh and Boyer-Ahmad
- Qanbarabad, Qazvin
- Qanbarabad, Razavi Khorasan
- Qanbarabad, South Khorasan
- Qanbarabad, Tehran
