= Wardeh =

Wardeh may refer to:

- Vardeh (disambiguation), places in Iran
- Nima Abu-Wardeh, BBC World News presenter
- Salim Wardeh (b. 1968), Lebanese politician
- Sami Abu Wardeh, character comedian
