= Alqchin-e Olya =

Village in Kohgiluyeh and Boyer-Ahmad province, Iran

Alqchin-e Olya Persian: القچین علیا
- Village
- Location within Iran
- Coordinates: 30°46′20″N 50°42′30″E
- Country: Iran
- Province: Kohgiluyeh and Boyer-Ahmad
- County: Charam
- District: Central
- Rural District: Alqchin

Population (2016)
  - Total: 718
- Time zone: UTC+3:30 (IRST)

Alqchin-e Olya (Persian: القچین علیا) (Note: Also romanized as Alqchīn-e ‘Olyā; also known as Alqchīn-e Bālā, Alqechīn-e Bālā, and Elqechīn Bālā) is a village in, and the capital of, Alqchin Rural District of the Central District (Note: Formerly Charam District of Kohgiluyeh County) of Charam County, Kohgiluyeh and Boyer-Ahmad province, Iran.

== Demographics ==
=== Population ===
At the time of the 2006 National Census, the village's population was 1,006 in 183 households, when it was in Charam District (Note: Renamed the Central District of Charam County) of Kohgiluyeh County. The following census in 2011 counted 847 people in 214 households, by which time the district had been separated from the county in the establishment of Charam County. The rural district was transferred to the new Central District. The 2016 census measured the population of the village as 718 people in 218 households.
