= Sheykh Hoseyn =

Sheykh Hoseyn (Persian: شيخ حسين) may refer to:

- Sheykh Hoseyn, East Azerbaijan
- Sheykh Hoseyn, Khuzestan
- Sheykh Hoseyn, Shush, Khuzestan Province
- Sheykh Hoseyn, Kohgiluyeh and Boyer-Ahmad
