= Bardian, Kohgiluyeh and Boyer-Ahmad =

Village in Kohgiluyeh and Boyer-Ahmad province, Iran

Bardian Persian: برديان
- Village
- Location within Iran
- Coordinates: 30°45′12″N 50°40′08″E
- Country: Iran
- Province: Kohgiluyeh and Boyer-Ahmad
- County: Charam
- District: Central
- Rural District: Alqchin

Population (2016)
  - Total: 1,751
- Time zone: UTC+3:30 (IRST)

Bardian (Persian: برديان) (Note: Also romanized as Bardīān, Bardiyan, and Bordeyān; also known as Burdiun and Būrdūn) is a village in Alqchin Rural District of the Central District (Note: Formerly Charam District of Kohgiluyeh County) of Charam County, Kohgiluyeh and Boyer-Ahmad province, Iran.

== Demographics ==
=== Population ===
At the time of the 2006 National Census, the village's population was 1,641 in 337 households, when it was in Charam District (Note: Renamed the Central District of Charam County) of Kohgiluyeh County. The following census in 2011 counted 1,800 people in 436 households, by which time the district had been separated from the county in the establishment of Charam County. The rural district was transferred to the new Central District. The 2016 census measured the population of the village as 1,751 people in 467 households. It was the most populous village in its rural district.
