= Cheshme Belghais Garden =

Garden in Charam, Iran

Cheshme Belghais
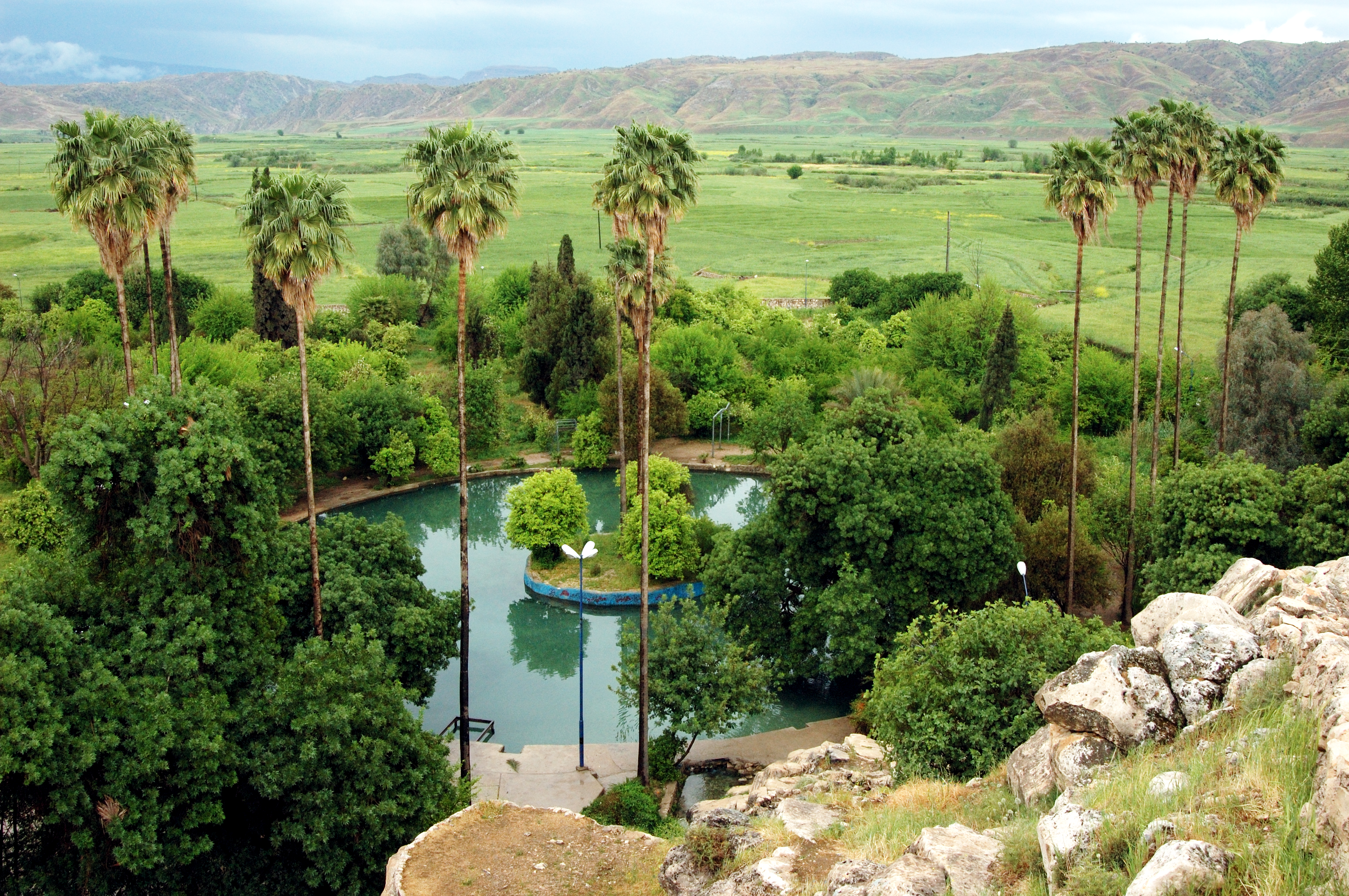
- Cheshme Belghais Garden

- Location: Cheram county, Cheram city
- Coordinates: 30°43′18″N 50°44′39″E

Cheshme Belghais Garden (or belqais spring garden) (Persian: باغ چشمه بلقیس) is a Persian garden located in Charam, Iran. This garden was created in 1944.

The source of garden water is several springs, four main springs located inside the garden. Alongside the main springs, it has four creeks and many mini springs. There is a large circular howz inside the garden with radius of 10 meters and depth of 1 meter. There is also a small square howz in the inner garden. Almost all of the garden plants and trees came from the National Botanical Garden of Iran at the time of its creation. On 29 September 2002 it was registered in the Iran National Heritage List with register number 6288.

== Gallery ==
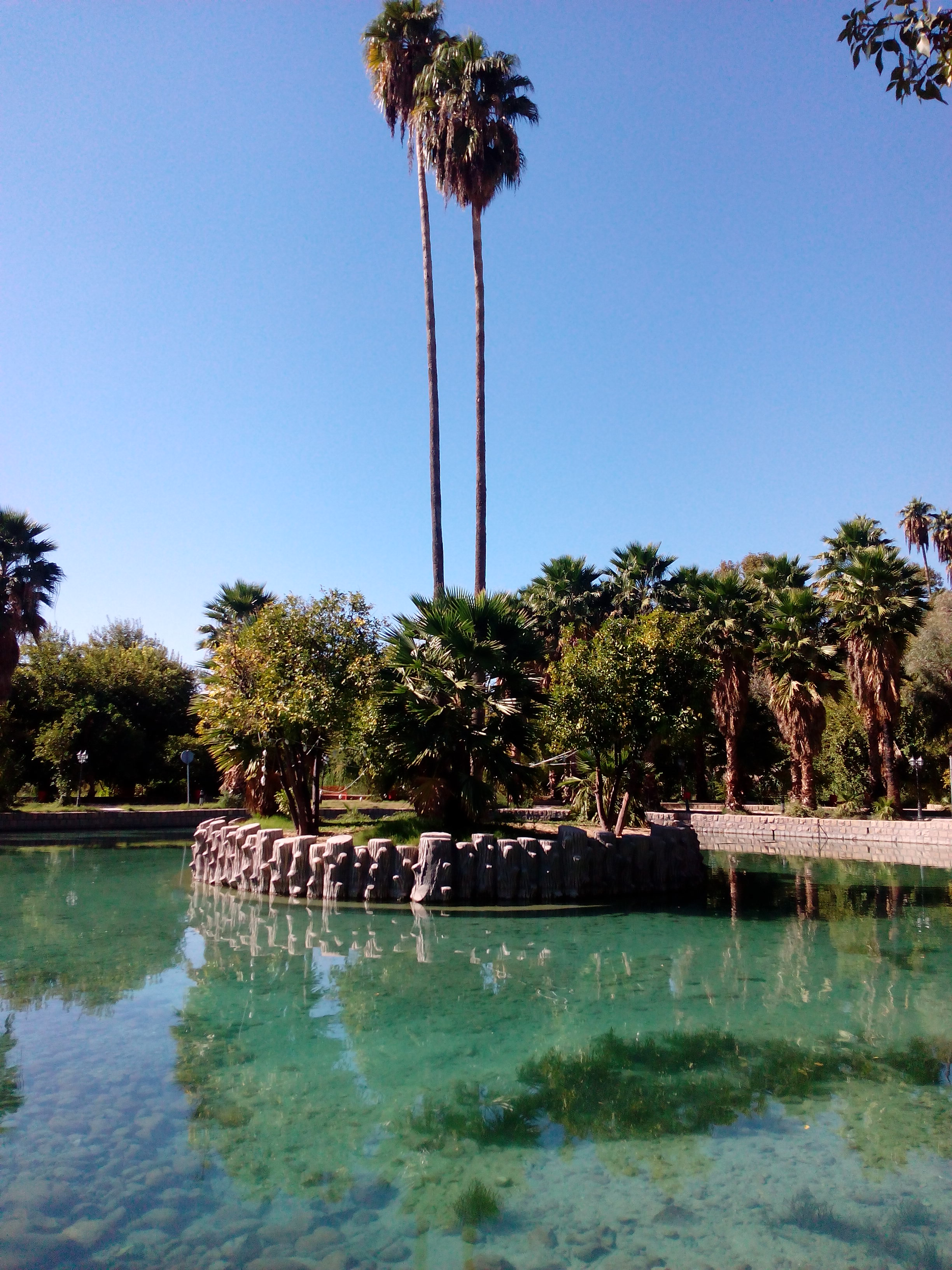
Garden main pool

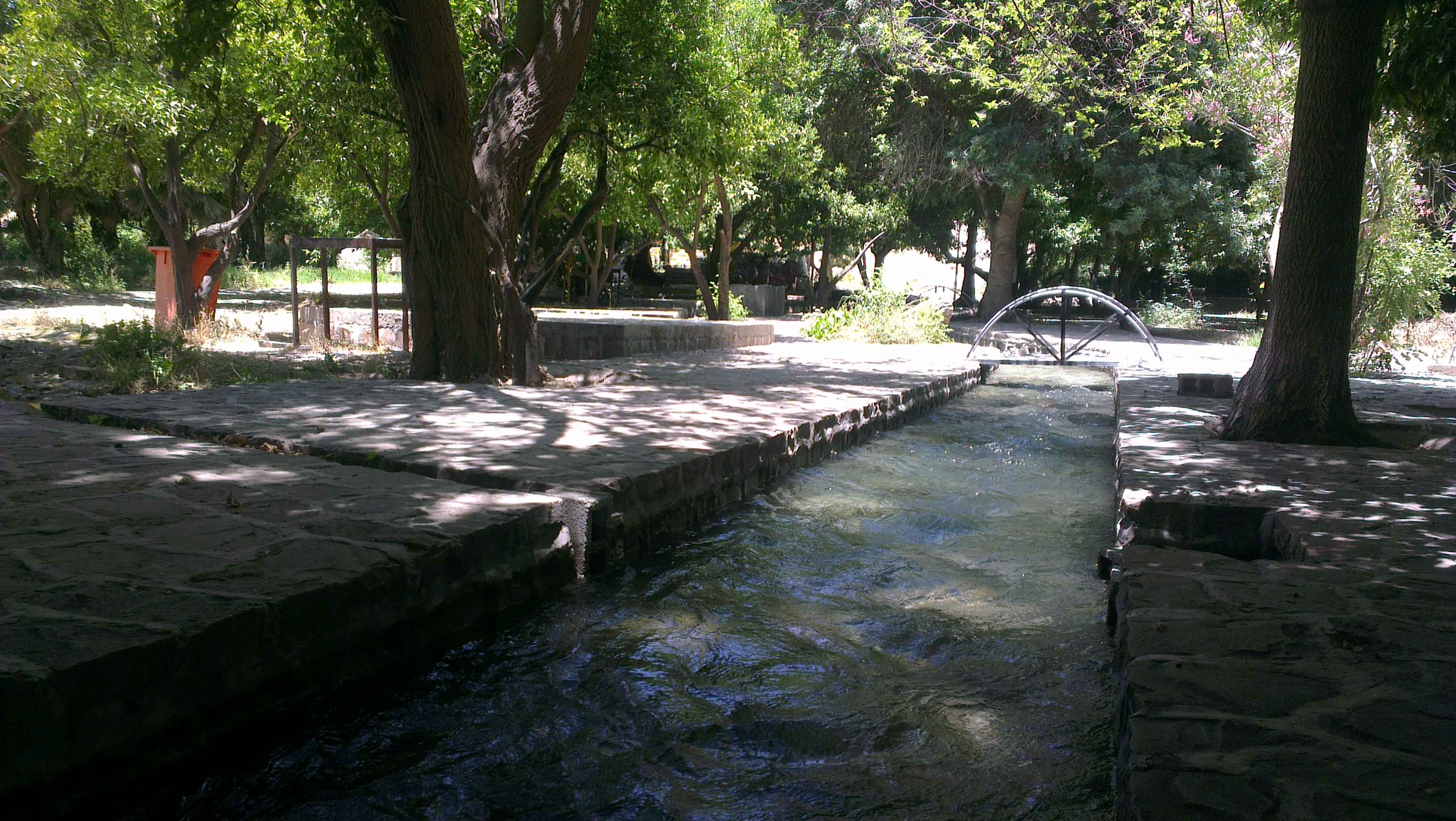
Main inner river

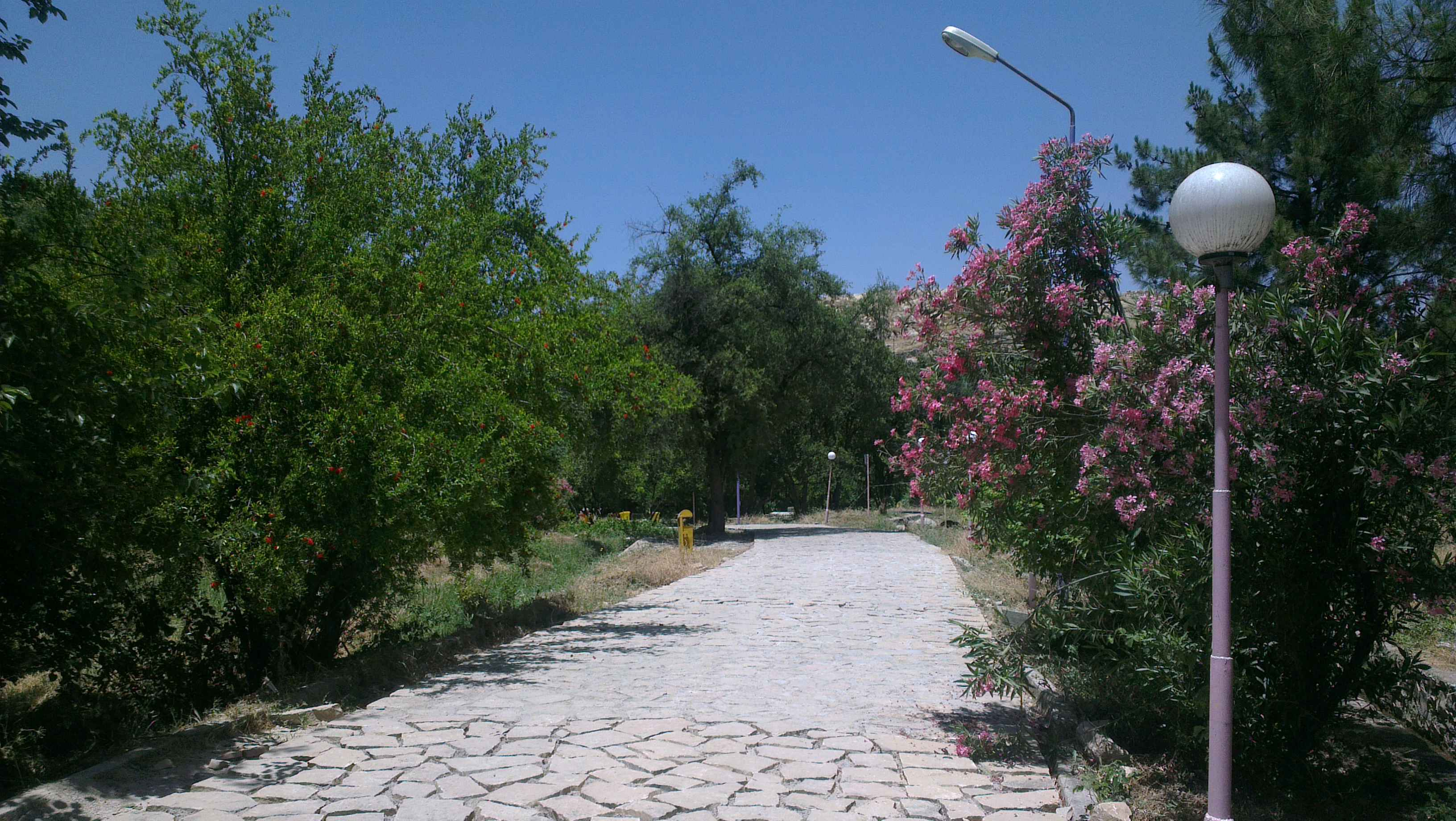
Main sidewalk

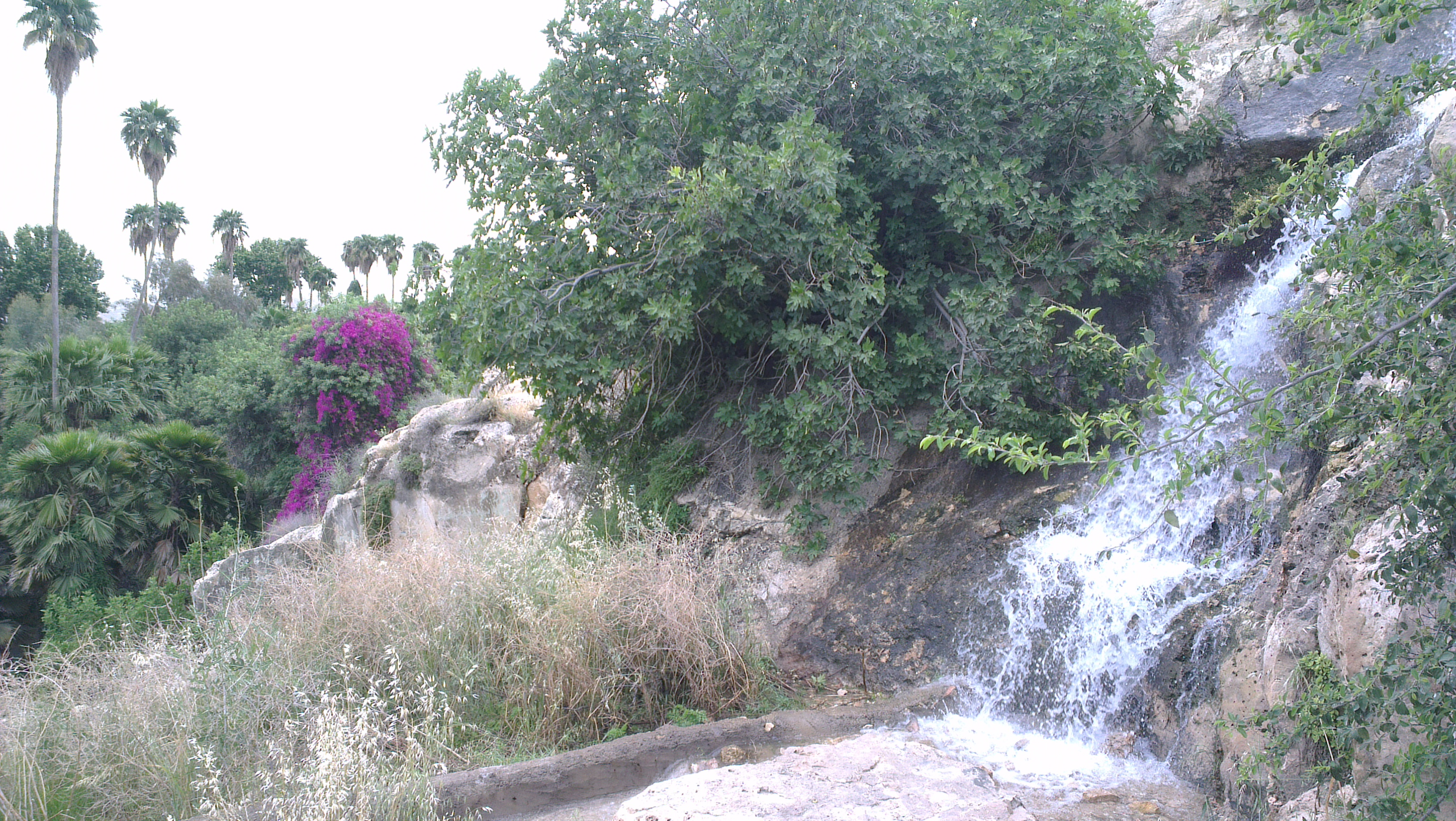
Main fountain source

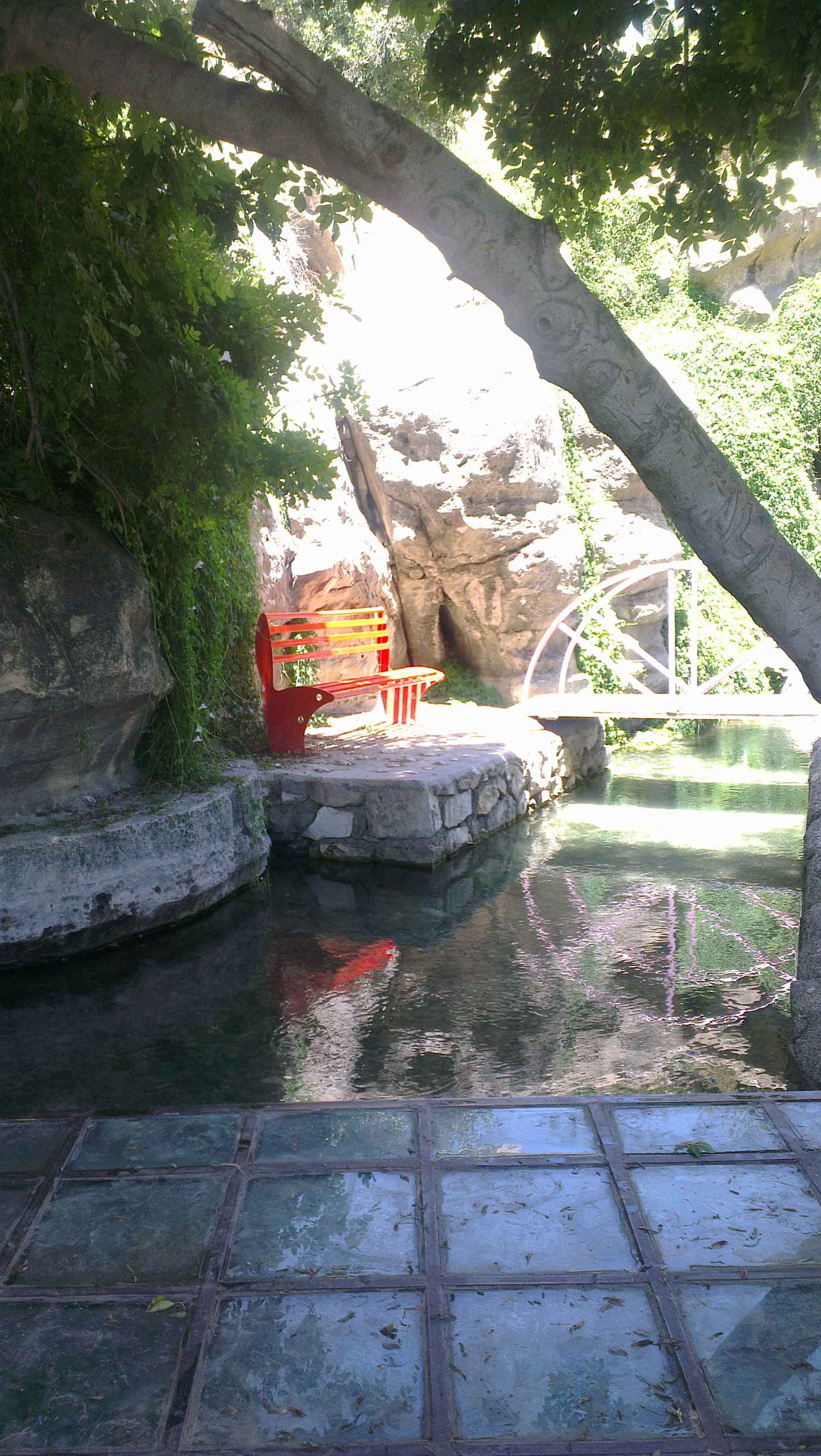
One example of garden chairs

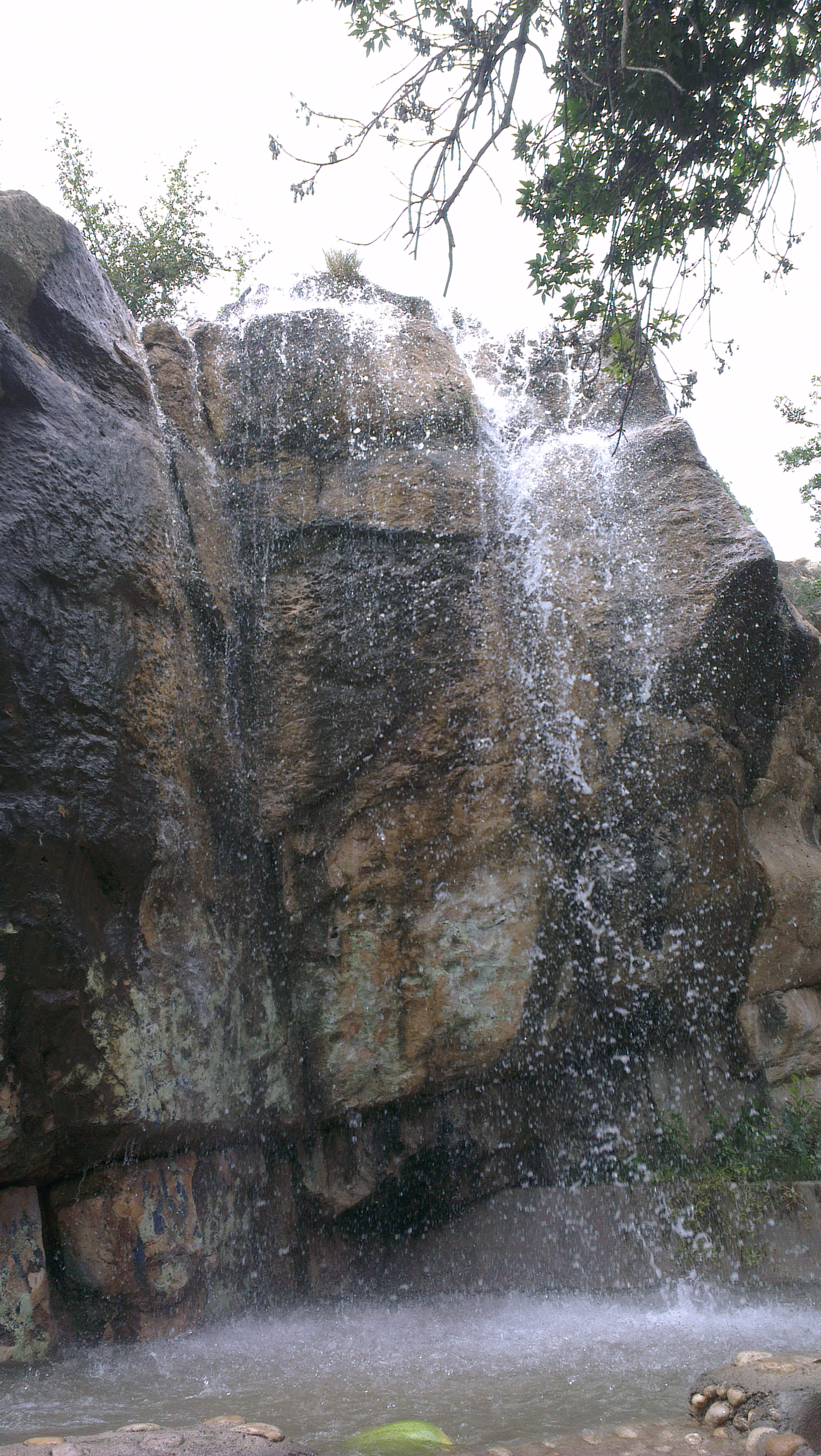
Main fountain
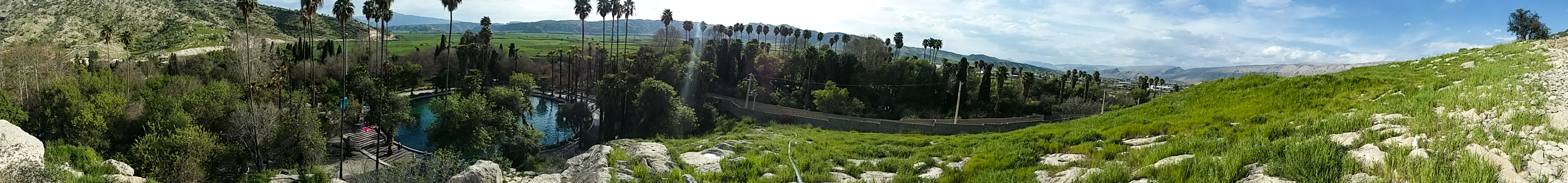
Panorama of garden
