= Parzard =

Parzard or Par-e Zard or Par Zard (Persian: پرزرد) may refer to:

- Parzard, Khuzestan
- Par Zard, Kohgiluyeh and Boyer-Ahmad
