= Vardeh =

Vardeh or Verdeh (Persian: ورده) may refer to:

- Vardeh, Alborz
- Vardeh, alternate name of Deh Bal, Kohgiluyeh and Boyer-Ahmad Province
- Verdeh, Markazi
- Vardeh, West Azerbaijan
