= Bonari-ye Fathi =

Bonari-ye Fathi بناري فتحي
- Village
- Location within Iran
- Coordinates: 31°19′43″N 50°28′18″E
- Country: Iran
- Province: Kohgiluyeh and Boyer-Ahmad
- County: Kohgiluyeh
- Bakhsh: Charusa
- Rural District: Tayebi-ye Sarhadi-ye Gharbi

Population (2006)
  - Total: 68
- Time zone: UTC+3:30 (IRST)
  - Summer (DST): UTC+4:30 (IRDT)

Bonari-ye Fathi (Persian: بناري فتحي, also Romanized as Bonārī-ye Fatḩī) is a village in Tayebi-ye Sarhadi-ye Gharbi Rural District, Charusa District, Kohgiluyeh County, Kohgiluyeh and Boyer-Ahmad Province, Iran. At the 2006 census, its population was 68, in 13 families.
