= National Botanical Garden of Iran =

Coordinates: 35.739667°N 51.182556°E

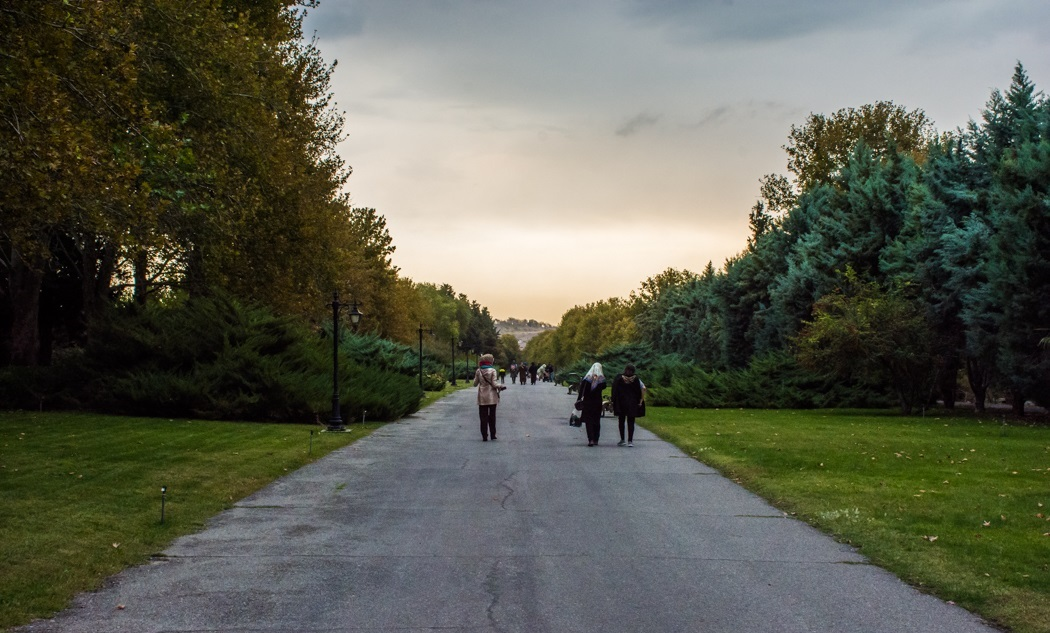
Main alley inside the National Botanical Garden of Iran

The lake in the rocky garden, National Botanical Garden of Iran

National Botanical Garden of Iran (Persian: باغ گیاه‌شناسی ملی ایران) is a Botanical Garden in Tehran, Iran. Its area is about 150 hectares and is planned to be the main center for horticulture and plant taxonomy in Iran. A herbarium of Iranian plants (TARI) is gradually being built up and now consists of some 160,000 numbers. Also there are gardens of non-Iranian plants such as Himalayan, American, Japanese, African, and Australian.

The garden also contains an arboretum, Six lakes, hills (to represent the Alborz and Zagros Mountains and Himalayas), rock garden, a waterfall, a wetland, desert plants areas, a salt lake and a wadi, a river about 1 km long, systematic area, fruit garden, picnic area with some pavilions and other facilities. The botanical and horticultural library has more than 11,000 volumes.
