= Neyab, South Khorasan =

Neyab نياب
- Village
- Location within Iran
- Coordinates: 32°24′15″N 59°45′04″E
- Country: Iran
- Province: South Khorasan
- County: Sarbisheh
- Bakhsh: Central
- Rural District: Momenabad

Population (2006)
  - Total: 77
- Time zone: UTC+3:30 (IRST)
  - Summer (DST): UTC+4:30 (IRDT)

Neyab (Persian: نياب, also Romanized as Neyāb, Naiāb, Nīāb, and Niyab) is a village in Momenabad Rural District, in the Central District of Sarbisheh County, South Khorasan Province, Iran. At the 2006 census, its population was 77, in 24 families.
