= Charam, Iran =

City in Kohgiluyeh and Boyer-Ahmad province, Iran

Charam Persian: چرام
- City

- Location within Iran
- Coordinates: 30°45′21″N 50°44′41″E
- Country: Iran
- Province: Kohgiluyeh and Boyer-Ahmad
- County: Charam
- District: Central
- Elevation: 788 m (2,585 ft)

Population (2016)
  - Total: 15,218
- Time zone: UTC+3:30 (IRST)

Charam (Persian: چرام) (Note: Also romanized as Charām and Cheram) is a city in the Central District (Note: Formerly Charam District of Kohgiluyeh County) of Charam County, Kohgiluyeh and Boyer-Ahmad province, Iran, serving as capital of both the county and the district.

== Demographics ==
=== Population ===
At the time of the 2006 National Census, the city's population was 11,980 in 2,264 households, when it was capital of Charam District (Note: Renamed the Central District of Charam County) of Kohgiluyeh County. The following census in 2011 counted 12,634 people in 2,863 households, by which time the district had separated from the county in the establishment of Charam County. Charam was transferred to the new Central District as the county's capital. The 2016 census measured the population of the city as 15,218 people in 3,929 households.

== Name ==
The city's name is written چرام in Persian and is also romanized as Charām and Cheram. In local usage, the name is also pronounced Cherom. A proposed etymology connects the name with the Persian word chara, referring to pasture or grazing; the explanation is associated with the area's traditional pastoral economy.

The settlement has also been associated with the name Talgerd (or Telgerd), after a historic mound and fortification in the present urban area. Historical references to the Charam tribal confederacy identify Talgerd as the residence of its chiefs.

== History ==
The historical record for the modern city is limited, and the history of the present settlement should be distinguished from that of the wider Charam area. The region was historically associated with the Charam tribal confederacy, whose chiefs were based at Talgerd. Writing about the confederacy, Pierre Oberling notes that it inhabited the Charam area of the Kohgiluyeh region in southwestern Iran and that its component tribes included groups with Lur and Turkic associations. He also cautions that little is known about the confederacy's origins or the dates when its constituent groups entered the region.

A Persian regional reference traces the wider county's archaeological history to the Elamite period, while listing historic remains in and around the city, including Talgerd Castle, Shahrak Castle and a historic complex beneath the city's bazaar. It associates Talgerd Castle with the Qajar period. These regional claims concern the wider area and do not by themselves establish an uninterrupted history of urban settlement at the present city site.

In modern administrative history, Charam was made a district within Kohgiluyeh County in 1975, and its central settlement was elevated to city status in 1977. In 2010, Charam County was created from territory formerly belonging to Kohgiluyeh County, with Charam as its administrative capital.

== Geography and climate ==
Charam is situated in southwestern Iran, in the Zagros region of Kohgiluyeh and Boyer-Ahmad province. The surrounding county includes mountain slopes and foothills as well as lower agricultural plains. The regional climate varies with elevation: the mountainous areas are described as cooler and semi-humid, while the lower southern plains are warmer and semi-arid.

The Nazmakan River and other streams and springs are important to the area's agricultural land, pastures and orchards. The natural vegetation of the wider county includes Iranian oak, along with trees such as pistachio, maple, almond and ash; regional sources also describe a range of other plant species in its woodlands and rangelands.

== People and language ==
Charam lies within a region historically associated with the Charam tribal confederacy and the Lur communities of Kohgiluyeh. Encyclopaedia Iranica describes the historical confederacy as including groups with both Lur and Turkic associations, while noting the limits of the historical evidence for its origins. Lori dialects are spoken across the Kohgiluyeh and Boyer-Ahmad region; the dialects of Kohgiluyeh and Boyer-Ahmad are classified among the Southern Lori varieties of the Western Iranian languages.

== Economy ==
The economy of Charam and its surrounding rural area has traditionally depended on agriculture and livestock raising. Main agricultural products reported for the county include cereals, rice and legumes, alongside animal products. Orchards and fruit growing are also present in parts of the surrounding region. Traditional handicrafts include rugs, kilims, jajims and woven sacks.

== Education ==
A history of education in Kohgiluyeh and Boyer-Ahmad records that a traditional maktab (school) was established in Charam in 1929 by Hossein-Qoli Charami, followed by Rodaki primary school in 1933.

Charam is also home to the School of Industry and Mines, an institution affiliated with Yasuj University. The school was established in 2012 and is one of the university's satellite campuses.

== Landmarks and tourism ==
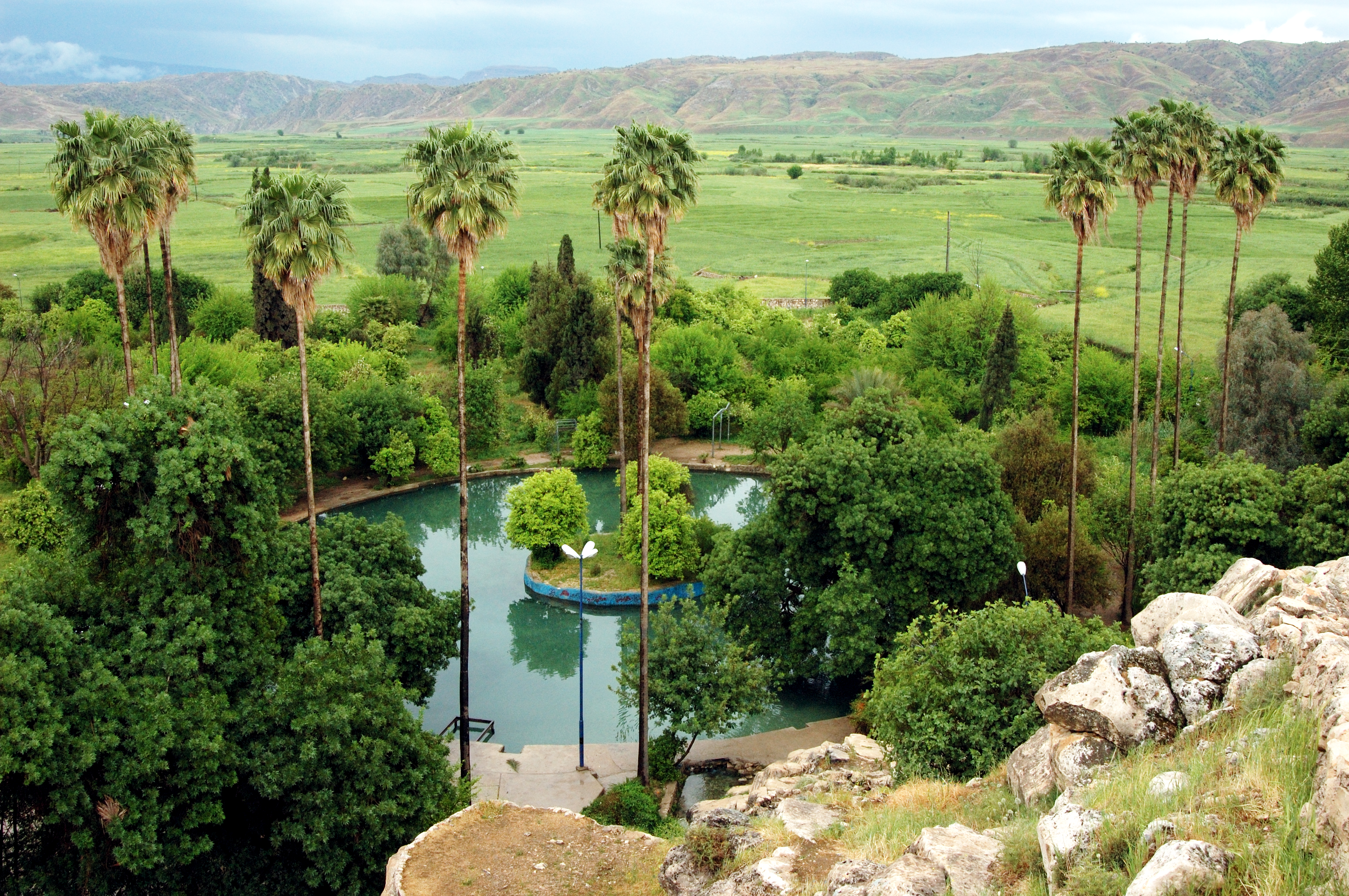
Cheshme Belghais Garden

One of the best-known attractions near Charam is Cheshme Belghais Garden, an Iranian garden near Shahrak village on the Charam–Gachsaran road. The present garden was developed from a wooded area in the 1940s, with planting, paths, pools, bridges and an irrigation system fed by springs and waterways. The garden was renovated in 2014. Visit Iran magazine describes it as covering about five and a half hectares and notes its central pool, irrigation channels and variety of fruit and ornamental trees.

Other historical places reported in the wider area include Tal-e Babuneh and Ghal'eh Fashian, which Visit Iran lists as registered national heritage sites. Regional sources also identify Talgerd Castle, Shahrak Castle and archaeological remains beneath Charam's bazaar among the historic sites of the county. The surrounding mountains and valleys, including the Tasuj area and its waterfall, are also mentioned in Iranian travel reporting as natural attractions in Charam County.
