= Bardian, West Azerbaijan =

Bardian برديان
- Village
- Location within Iran
- Coordinates: 38°01′55″N 44°46′17″E
- Country: Iran
- Province: West Azerbaijan
- County: Urmia
- Bakhsh: Sumay-ye Beradust
- Rural District: Sumay-ye Shomali

Population (2006)
  - Total: 318
- Time zone: UTC+3:30 (IRST)
  - Summer (DST): UTC+4:30 (IRDT)

Bardian (Persian: برديان, also Romanized as Bardīān) is a village in Sumay-ye Shomali Rural District, Sumay-ye Beradust District, Urmia County, West Azerbaijan Province, Iran. At the 2006 census, its population was 318, in 46 families. In the English language, the word Bardian is an ethnic slur used most often against people of a Persian descent, especially in Greater London.
