= Dom Darreh Humian =

Dom Darreh Humian دم دره هوميان
- Village
- Location within Iran
- Coordinates: 33°40′51″N 47°35′44″E
- Country: Iran
- Province: Lorestan
- County: Kuhdasht
- Bakhsh: Central
- Rural District: Kuhdasht-e Shomali

Population (2006)
  - Total: 176
- Time zone: UTC+3:30 (IRST)
  - Summer (DST): UTC+4:30 (IRDT)

Dom Darreh Humian (Persian: دم دره هوميان, also Romanized as Dom Darreh Hūmīān; also known as Dom Darreh) is a village in Kuhdasht-e Shomali Rural District, in the Central District of Kuhdasht County, Lorestan Province, Iran. At the 2006 census, its population was 176, in 40 families.
