= Bonari =

Bonari بناري
- Village
- Location within Iran
- Coordinates: 31°20′12″N 50°27′48″E
- Country: Iran
- Province: Kohgiluyeh and Boyer-Ahmad
- County: Kohgiluyeh
- Bakhsh: Charusa
- Rural District: Tayebi-ye Sarhadi-ye Gharbi

Population (2006)
  - Total: 221
- Time zone: UTC+3:30 (IRST)
  - Summer (DST): UTC+4:30 (IRDT)

Bonari (Persian: بناري, also Romanized as Bonārī) is a village in Tayebi-ye Sarhadi-ye Gharbi Rural District, Charusa District, Kohgiluyeh County, Kohgiluyeh and Boyer-Ahmad Province, in southwestern Iran. At the 2006 census, the village population was 221, in 42 families.
