= Darreh Shir, Chaharmahal and Bakhtiari =

Darreh Shir دره شير
- Village
- Location within Iran
- Coordinates: 31°12′25″N 51°09′40″E
- Country: Iran
- Province: Chaharmahal and Bakhtiari
- County: Lordegan
- Bakhsh: Falard
- Rural District: Poshtkuh

Population (2006)
  - Total: 83
- Time zone: UTC+3:30 (IRST)
  - Summer (DST): UTC+4:30 (IRDT)

Darreh Shir (Persian: دره شير, also Romanized as Darreh Shīr) is a village in Poshtkuh Rural District, Falard District, Lordegan County, Chaharmahal and Bakhtiari Province, Iran. At the 2006 census, its population was 83, in 19 families. The village is populated by Lurs.
