= Alqchin Rural District =

Rural district in Kohgiluyeh and Boyer-Ahmad province, Iran

Alqchin Rural District Persian: دهستان الغچين
- Rural District
- Location within Iran
- Coordinates: 30°46′04″N 50°41′42″E
- Country: Iran
- Province: Kohgiluyeh and Boyer-Ahmad
- County: Charam
- District: Central
- Capital: Alqchin-e Olya

Population (2016)
  - Total: 5,215
- Time zone: UTC+3:30 (IRST)

Alqchin Rural District (Persian: دهستان الغچين) is in the Central District (Note: Formerly Charam District of Kohgiluyeh County) of Charam County, Kohgiluyeh and Boyer-Ahmad province, Iran. Its capital is the village of Alqchin-e Olya.

== Demographics ==
=== Population ===
At the time of the 2006 National Census, the rural district's population (as a part of Charam District (Note: Renamed the Central District of Charam County) of Kohgiluyeh County) was 5,775 in 1,105 households. There were 5,501 inhabitants in 1,330 households at the following census of 2011, by which time the district had been separated from the county in the establishment of Charam County. The rural district was transferred to the new Central District. The 2016 census measured the population of the rural district as 5,215 in 1,442 households. The most populous of its 18 villages was Bardian, with 1,751 people.
