= Charam Rural District (Charam County) =

Rural district in Kohgiluyeh and Boyer-Ahmad province, Iran

Charam Rural District Persian: دهستان چرام
- Rural District
- Location within Iran
- Coordinates: 30°42′28″N 50°56′30″E
- Country: Iran
- Province: Kohgiluyeh and Boyer-Ahmad
- County: Charam
- District: Central
- Capital: Karreh Shahbazi

Population (2016)
  - Total: 5,534
- Time zone: UTC+3:30 (IRST)

Charam Rural District (Persian: دهستان چرام) is in the Central District (Note: Formerly Charam District of Kohgiluyeh County) of Charam County, Kohgiluyeh and Boyer-Ahmad province, Iran. Its capital is the village of Karreh Shahbazi.

== Demographics ==
=== Population ===
At the time of the 2006 National Census, the rural district's population was (as a part of Charam District (Note: Renamed the Central District of Charam County) of Kohgiluyeh County) was 7,234 in 1,313 households. There were 5,935 inhabitants in 1,351 households at the following census of 2011, by which time the district had been separated from the county in the establishment of Charam County. The rural district was transferred to the new Central District. The 2016 census measured the population of the rural district as 5,534 in 1,453 households. The most populous of its 61 villages was Karreh Shahbazi, with 2,240 people.
