= Central District (Charam County) =

District in Kohgiluyeh and Boyer-Ahmad province, Iran

Central District (Charam County) Persian: بخش مرکزی شهرستان چرام
- District
- Location within Iran
- Coordinates: 30°42′28″N 50°55′19″E
- Country: Iran
- Province: Kohgiluyeh and Boyer-Ahmad
- County: Charam
- Capital: Charam

Population (2016)
  - Total: 25,967
- Time zone: UTC+3:30 (IRST)

The Central District of Charam County (Persian: بخش مرکزی شهرستان چرام) (Note: Formerly Charam District (بخش چرام) of Kohgiluyeh County) is in Kohgiluyeh and Boyer-Ahmad province, Iran. Its capital is the city of Charam.

== History ==
After the 2006 National Census, Charam (Note: Renamed the Central District of Charam County) and Sarfaryab Districts were separated from Kohgiluyeh County in the establishment of Charam County, which was divided into two districts of two rural districts each, with Charam as its capital and the only city at the time.

== Demographics ==
=== Population ===
At the time of the 2011 census, the district's population (as Charam District of Kohgiluyeh County) was 24,989 people in 4,682 households. There were 24,070 inhabitants in 5,544 households at the following census of 2011. The 2016 census measured the population of the district as 25,967 inhabitants in 6,824 households.

=== Administrative divisions ===
Central District (Charam County) Population (Note: As Charam District of Kohgiluyeh County at the 2006 census)
Administrative Divisions	2006	2011	2016
Alqchin RD	5,775	5,501	5,215
Charam RD	7,234	5,935	5,534
Charam (city)	11,980	12,634	15,218
Total	24,989	24,070	25,967
RD = Rural District
