= Charam County =

County in Kohgiluyeh and Boyer-Ahmad province, Iran

Charam County Persian: شهرستان چرام
- County
- Location of Charam County in Kohgiluyeh and Boyer-Ahmad province (center, purple)

- Location of Kohgiluyeh and Boyer-Ahmad province in Iran
- Coordinates: 30°52′48″N 50°50′40″E
- Country: Iran
- Province: Kohgiluyeh and Boyer-Ahmad
- Capital: Charam
- Districts: Central, Sarfaryab

Population (2016)
  - Total: 33,543
- Time zone: UTC+3:30 (IRST)

Charam County (Persian: شهرستان چرام) is in Kohgiluyeh and Boyer-Ahmad province, in southwestern Iran. Its capital is the city of Charam.

== History ==
After the 2006 National Census, Charam (Note: Renamed the Central District of Charam County) and Sarfaryab Districts were separated from Kohgiluyeh County in the establishment of Charam County, which was divided into two districts of two rural districts each, with Charam as its capital and the only city at the time. After the 2011 census, the village of Bar Aftab-e Sarfaryab was elevated to city status as Sarfaryab.

== Demographics ==
=== Population ===
At the time of the 2011 census, the county's population was 32,159 people in 7,514 households. The 2016 census measured the population of the district as 33,543 in 8,890 households.

=== Administrative divisions ===
Charam County's population history and administrative structure over two consecutive censuses are shown in the following table.

Charam County Population
Administrative Divisions	2011	2016
Central District (Note: Formerly Charam District)	24,070	25,967
Alqchin RD	5,501	5,215
Charam RD	5,935	5,534
Charam (city)	12,634	15,218
Sarfaryab District	8,076	7,576
Poshteh-ye Zilayi RD	2,781	2,416
Sarfaryab RD	5,295	3,165
Sarfaryab (city) (Note: Formerly the village of Bar Aftab-e Sarfaryab)		1,995
Total	32,159	33,543
RD = Rural District

== See also ==
Media related to Choram County at Wikimedia Commons
