= 1979 Iranian Constitutional Assembly election in Tehran province =

Tehran election
- 3 August 1979

10 Members in the Assembly for the Final Review of the Constitution
- Coalitions by number of seats won
Alliance	Great Islamic Coalition	Quintuple Coalition	Grand National Alliance
Seats won	10 / 10	3 / 10	2 / 10
Alliance	Septuple Coalition
Seats won	0 / 10
- Parties whose members won
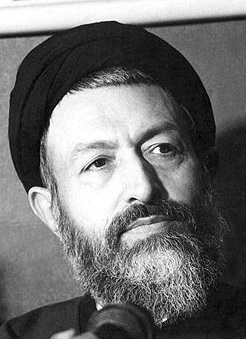

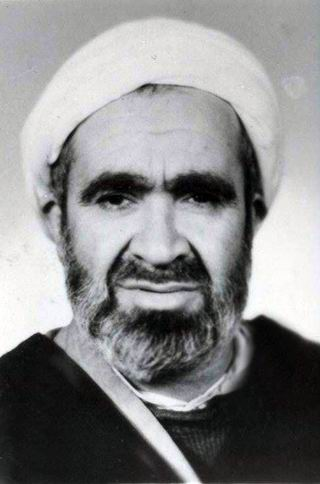
	Majority party	Minority party	Third party
Leader	Mohammad Beheshti	Mehdi Bazargan	Hussein-Ali Montazeri
Party	IRP	FMI	SST
Seats won	5 / 10	2 / 10	1 / 10

Defeated lists
- Organization of Iranian People's Fedai Guerrillas; Septuple Coalition; Muslim People's Republic Party (list retracted); National Front (list retracted); Radical Movement of Iran; Nation Party of Iran; Tudeh Party of Iran; Socialist Workers' Party of Iran

On 3 August 1979, Constitutional Convention election was held in Tehran Province constituency with plurality-at-large voting format in order to decide ten seats for the Assembly for the Final Review of the Constitution

It resulted in a landslide victory or the Coalition of Islamic Parties, which all of its candidates won with a wide margin. Unlike other constituencies, the coalition's list of candidates was not dominated by the Khomeinists in the Islamic Republican Party and included four of their moderate rivals. Mahmoud Taleghani, the popular cleric who was endorsed by groups in a wide range of political spectrum, was ranked first and gained almost 80% of votes. Other coalitions including the Quintuple Coalition and the Grand National Alliance were defeated and none of their candidates, exempting those shared with the Islamic coalition, performed well. The former's top exclusive candidates, Asghar Sayyed Javadi and Massoud Rajavi, received no better than 12% of all votes cast.

No secular group was successful and all of candidates affiliated with such parties were defeated. Communist parties like the Organization of Iranian People's Fedai Guerrillas, the Tudeh Party of Iran, the Socialist Workers' Party of Iran and the Laborers' Party of Iran, as well as those of the nationalists such as the Nation Party of Iran, the National Front and the Radical Movement of Iran, all did poor.

== Results ==
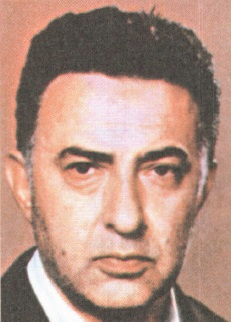
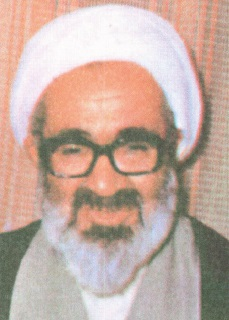
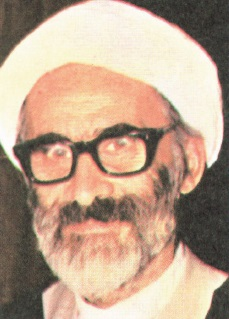
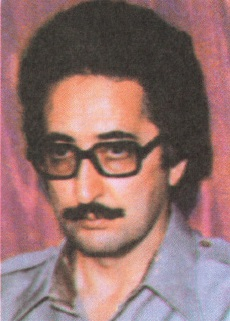
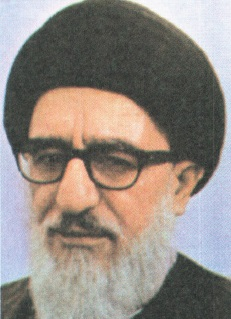
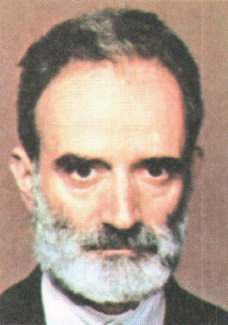
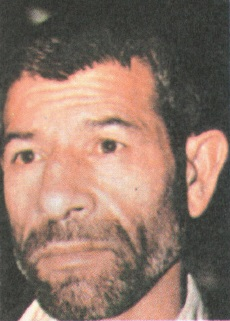
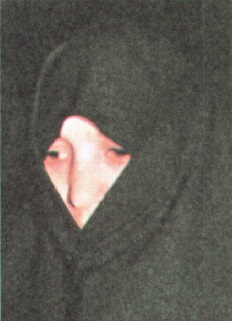
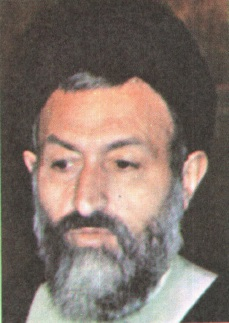
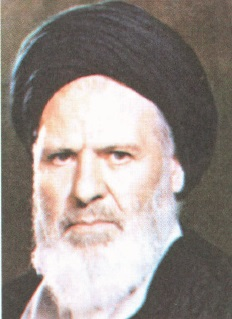
Candidates of the Coalition of Islamic Parties who won in a landslide
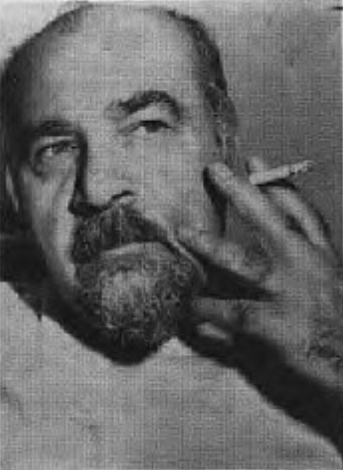
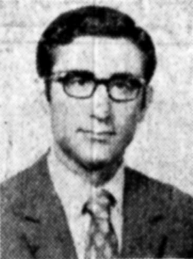
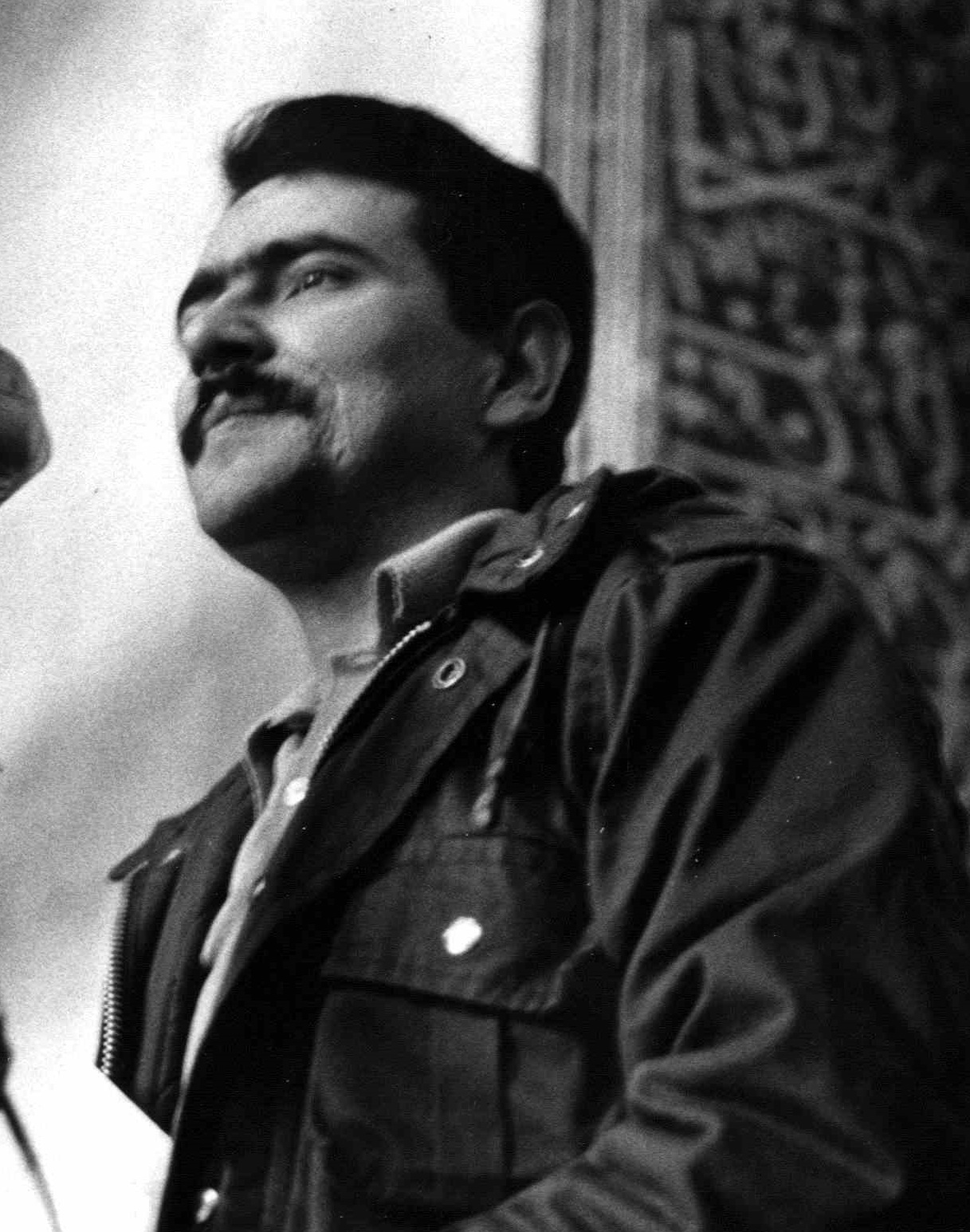
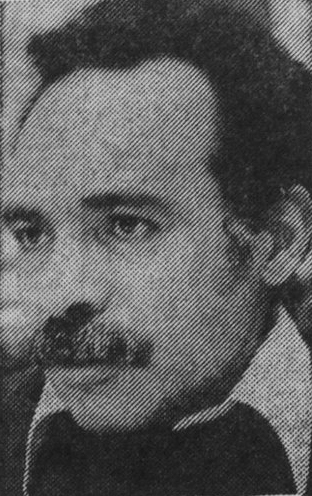
Defeated candidates of the Quintuple Coalition
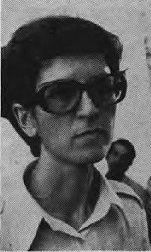
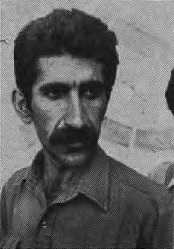
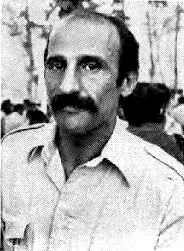
Organization of Iranian People's Fedai Guerrillas candidates
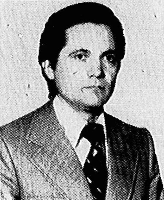
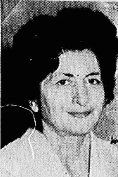
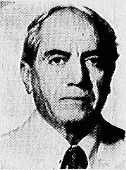
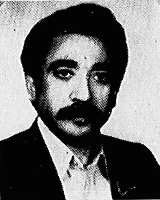
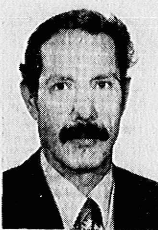
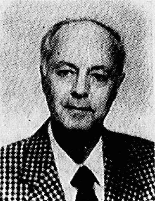
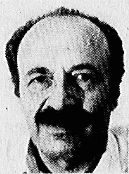
Tudeh Party of Iran candidates
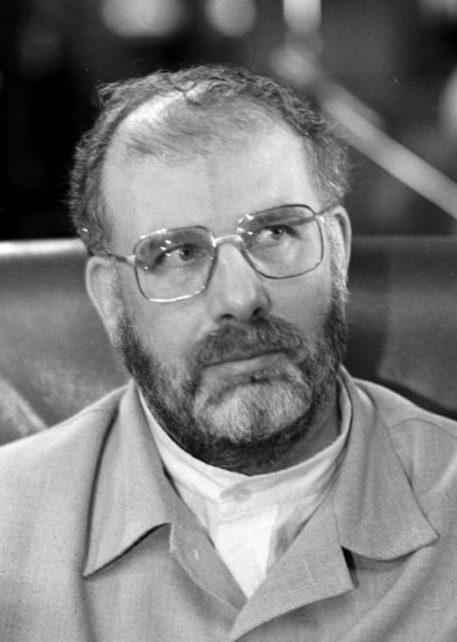
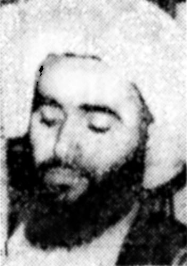
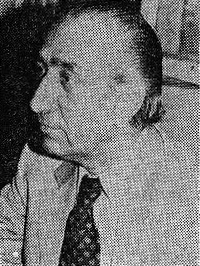
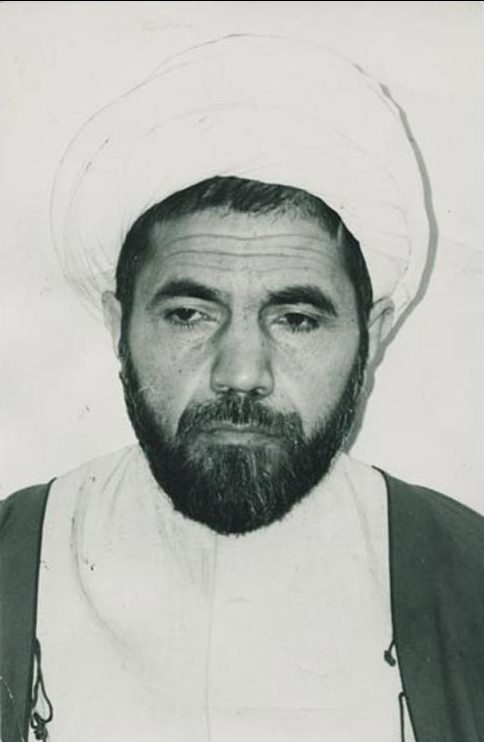
Defeated candidates of different groups

#	Candidate	Affiliation	Votes	%
1	Mahmoud Taleghani	Freedom Movement of Iran (Note: Listed by the Islamic Coalition) (Note: Listed by the Quintuple Coalition) (Note: Listed by the Grand National Alliance)	2,016,801	79.86
2	Abolhassan Banisadr	Independent	1,763,126	69.82
3	Hossein-Ali Montazeri	Society of Seminary Teachers	1,672,980	66.25
4	Ali Golzadeh Ghafouri	Independent	1,560,970	61.81
5	Mohammad Beheshti	Islamic Republican Party	1,547,550	61.28
6	Ezzatollah Sahabi	Freedom Movement of Iran	1,449,713	57.41
7	Abdul-Karim Mousavi Ardebili	Islamic Republican Party	1,389,846	55.04
8	Abbas Sheibani	Islamic Republican Party	1,387,813	54.95
9	Monireh Gorji	Islamic Republican Party	1,313,731	52.02
10	Ali-Mohammad Arab	Islamic Republican Party	1,305,136	51.68
11	Asghar Sayyed Javadi	The Movement for Freedom	298,360	11.81
12	Massoud Rajavi	People's Mujahedin Organization	297,707	11.79
13	Fakhreddin Hejazi	Islamic Republican Party	189,016	7.48
14	Abdolkarim Lahiji	Independent	179,798	7.12
15	Habibollah Peyman	Movement of Militant Muslims	164,644	6.52
16	Mohammad Mofatteh	Combatant Clergy Association	153,575	6.08
17	Azam Taleghani	Women of Islamic Revolution	132,430	5.24
18	Sadegh Khalkhali	Combatant Clergy Association	122,217	4.84
19	Roghayeh Daneshgari	People's Fedai Guerrillas (Note: Listed by the Septuple Coalition)	115,334	4.57
20	Yahya Nasiri	Combatant Clergy Association	111,279	4.41
21	Naser Katouzian	The Movement for Freedom	110,859	4.39
22	Tahereh Saffarzadeh	Movement of Militant Muslims	101,778	4.03
23	Mostafa Madani	People's Fedai Guerrillas	100,894	4.00
24	Heshmatollah Raisi	People's Fedai Guerrillas	90,641	3.59
25	Zahra Rahnavard	Independent	77,932	3.09
26	Hassan Tavanayanfard	Independent	75,352	2.98
27	Mehdi Hajghazi-Tehrani	Vanguard Workers	56,085	2.22
28	Morteza Aladpoush	Peykar	49,979	1.98
29	Ehsan Tabari	Tudeh Party	47,225	1.87
30	Hasan Nazih	Freedom Movement of Iran	44,765	1.77
31	Nezameddin Ghahari	JAMA	36,791	1.46
32	Noureddin Kianouri	Tudeh Party	32,627	1.29
33	Mohammad-Ali Amouyi	Tudeh Party	25,792	1.02
34	Maryam Farmanfarmaian	Tudeh Party	25,792	1.02
35	Asef Razmdideh	Tudeh Party	20,942	0.83
36	Hassan Habibi	Freedom Movement of Iran	17,819	0.71
37	Abdolhamid Iravani	Combatant Clergy Association	17,819	0.71
38	Babak Zahraie	Socialist Workers' Party	16,446	0.65
39	Saber Mohammadzadeh	Tudeh Party	16,150	0.64
40	Abbas Hajari-Bajestani	Tudeh Party	15,942	0.63
41	Lotfollah Meisami	People's Mujahedin Movement	11,274	0.45
42	Mahmoud Enayat	Muslim People's Republic Party	10,645	0.42
43	Parvaneh Forouhar	Nation Party	8,110	0.32
44	Hossein Ansarian	Combatant Clergy Association	6,748	0.27
45	Alireza Jahandar	Independent	4,785	0.19
46	Mahmoud Rezaei-Hanjeni	Hojjatieh	4,173	0.17
47	Ali Sadeghi	The Revolutionary Organization	3,473	0.14
48	Noor-Ali Tabandeh	Independent	3,343	0.13
49	Behrouz Boroumand	Nation Party	2,840	0.11
50	Majid Zarbakhsh	The Revolutionary Organization	2,719	0.11
51	Farideh Garman	The Revolutionary Organization	2,685	0.11
52	Gholam-Ali Maloul	Independent	2,568	0.10
53	Asghar Ghaem-Maghami	Independent (ex-Military)	2,519	0.10
54	Esmail Khoi	Independent	2,500	0.10
55	Sedigheh Nabavi	Socialist Workers' Party	1,974	0.08
56	Simin Movahed	Socialist Workers' Party	1,705	0.07
57	Mostafa Rahnama	Independent	1,629	0.06
58	Gholam-Ali Hassas	Independent	1,509	0.06
59	Manouchehr Masoudi	Nation Party	1,482	0.06
60	Nosratollah Amini	National Front	1,407	0.06
61	Esmail Fazelpour	Nation Party	1,356	0.05
62	Rahim Abedi	Radical Movement	1,305	0.05
63	Ebrahim Karimabadi	National Front	1,175	0.05
64	Hossein Lankarani	Independent	1,113	0.04
65	Khosrow Seif	Nation Party	1,042	0.04
66	Hadi Soudbakhsh	The Revolutionary Organization	990	0.04
67	Mohammad-Reza Jafari	Unknown	954	0.04
68	Jalal Ghanizadeh	National Front	590	0.02
69	Abolghasem Rafiee	Unknown	580	0.02
70	Naser Rangraz	Unknown	574	0.02
71	Ebadollah Mahmoudian	Socialist Workers' Party	567	0.02
72	Hojabr Khosravi-Azarbaijani	Socialist Workers' Party	555	0.02
73	Sadegh Taghavi	Independent	507	0.02
74	Mohammad-Reza Amir-Aslani	Socialist Workers' Party	496	0.02
75	Ali Sadri	Nation Party	487	0.02
76	Ramezan Haj-Esmaili	Unknown	466	0.02
77	Abbas Abbasi	Unknown	447	0.02
78	Mohammad-Reza Sadeghi	Unknown	416	0.02
79	Seyyed Mehdi Hashemi	Unknown	392	0.02
80	Seyyed Ahmad Taghavizadeh	Independent	349	0.01
81	Naser Fatemi	Unknown	301	0.01
82	Mohammad-Kaveh Touyserkani	Unknown	286	0.01
83	Ali Esmaili	Unknown	262	0.01
84	Ahmad Fardid	Independent	201	0.01
85	Mohammad-Hassan Shaqaqi	Unknown	195	0.01
86	Gholamreza Mortazavi	Radical Movement	176	0.01
87	Mahmoud Javidan	Independent	152	0.01
88	Shahrokh Vakhshouri	Republican Party	138	0.01
89	Jalal Mofid	Unknown	136	0.01
90	Taghi Davoudi-Makkinejad	Radical Movement	131	0.01
90	Khalil Haghighat	Jamiat Edalat	131	0.01
92	Naser Yamin Mardux-Kordestani	Independent	112	0.00
93	Ahmad Haritash	Independent	111	0.00
94	Ehsanollah Afshari	Independent	110	0.00
95	Gholamreza Teiranian	Independent	108	0.00
96	Naser Engheta	Independent	102	0.00
96	Ahmad Shahab	Fada'iyan-e Islam	102	0.00
98	Ziaedin Khajekarimedini	Independent	99	0.00
99	Seyyed Yousef Hashemi	Unknown	75	0.00
100	Habibollah Zolghadr	Independent	68	0.00
100	Hormoz Bahmanpour	Unknown	68	0.00
102	Hossein Afshar-Moghadam	Unknown	66	0.00
102	Ali-Akbar Ajili	Mojahedan-e Rah-e Haq	66	0.00
104	Jalil Hoghoughi	Unknown	54	0.00
104	Hadi Khatami	Combatant Clergy Association	54	0.00
106	Mostafa Jomhouri	Unknown	44	0.00
107	Farrokh Shaban	Unknown	36	0.00
108	Seyyed Hadi Parnia	Unknown	21	0.00
109	Abbas-Ali Mazloumi Jahromi	Unknown	19	0.00
Total Votes			2,525,381	100
Legend: Islamic modernists Islamists Communists Secular nationalists

=== By County ===
Karaj County
#	Candidate	Votes	%
1	Mahmoud Taleghani	208,034	99.23
2	Abolhassan Banisadr	185,657	88.56
3	Hossein-Ali Montazeri	180,753	86.22
4	Mohammad Beheshti	168,937	80.58
5	Ali Golzadeh Ghafouri	165,503	78.95
6	Ezzatollah Sahabi	159,468	76.07
7	Abdul-Karim Mousavi Ardebili	153,456	73.20
8	Abbas Sheibani	150,106	71.60
9	Ali-Mohammad Arab	139,133	66.37
10	Monireh Gorji	138,325	65.98
11	Sadegh Khalkhali	23,634	11.27
12	Asghar Sayyed Javadi	19,345	9.23
13	Massoud Rajavi	18,704	8.92
14	Azam Taleghani	15,149	7.23
15	Habibollah Peyman	14,043	6.70
16	Fakhreddin Hejazi	12,520	5.97
17	Abdolkarim Lahiji	8,575	4.09
18	Hassan Tavanayanfard	8,275	3.95
19	Yahya Nasiri	6,245	2.98
20	Zahra Rahnavard	5,745	2.74
21	Naser Katouzian	5,725	2.73
22	Tahereh Saffarzadeh	5,445	2.60
23	Mohammad Mofatteh	5,314	2.53
24	Roghayeh Daneshgari	4,683	2.23
25	Mostafa Madani	3,846	1.83
Total Votes		209,642	100

Varamin County
#	Candidate	Votes	%
1	Mahmoud Taleghani	63,295	98.29
2	Hossein-Ali Montazeri	60,524	93.99
3	Abolhassan Banisadr	59,401	92.24
4	Mohammad Beheshti	58,647	91.07
5	Abdul-Karim Mousavi Ardebili	57,663	89.55
6	Ali Golzadeh Ghafouri	57,567	89.40
7	Abbas Sheibani	56,312	87.45
8	Ali-Mohammad Arab	55,071	85.52
9	Monireh Gorji	53,154	82.54
10	Ezzatollah Sahabi	31,610	49.09
11	Mohammad Mofatteh	23,438	36.40
12	Fakhreddin Hejazi	3,101	4.82
13	Yahya Nasiri	1,846	2.87
14	Azam Taleghani	1,736	2.70
15	Zahra Rahnavard	1,734	2.69
16	Asghar Sayyed Javadi	1,690	2.62
17	Sadegh Khalkhali	1,644	2.55
18	Habibollah Peyman	1,534	2.38
19	Massoud Rajavi	1,505	2.34
20	Hassan Tavanayanfard	816	1.27
21	Naser Katouzian	553	0.86
21	Abdolkarim Lahiji	553	0.86
23	Tahereh Saffarzadeh	309	0.48
24	Hassan Nazih	267	0.41
25	Roghayeh Daneshgari	254	0.39
Total Votes		64,395	100

Damavand County and Firuzkuh District
#	Candidate	Votes	%
1	Mahmoud Taleghani	35,569	98.92
2	Abolhassan Banisadr	33,652	93.59
3	Hossein-Ali Montazeri	33,118	92.10
4	Ezzatollah Sahabi	32,795	91.21
5	Ali Golzadeh Ghafouri	32,437	90.21
6	Mohammad Beheshti	32,152	89.42
7	Abdul-Karim Mousavi Ardebili	31,050	86.35
8	Abbas Sheibani	30,857	85.82
9	Ali-Mohammad Arab	30,152	83.86
10	Monireh Gorji	29,951	83.30
11	Massoud Rajavi	2,230	6.20
12	Asghar Sayyed Javadi	1,939	5.39
13	Habibollah Peyman	1,660	4.62
14	Abdolkarim Lahiji	1,215	3.38
15	Yahya Nasiri	1,193	3.32
16	Mostafa Madani	890	2.48
17	Naser Katouzian	837	2.33
18	Roghayeh Daneshgari	795	2.21
19	Mohammad Mofatteh	739	2.06
20	Tahereh Saffarzadeh	727	2.02
21	Heshmatollah Raisi	692	1.92
22	Azam Taleghani	655	1.82
23	Zahra Rahnavard	625	1.74
24	Fakhreddin Hejazi	548	1.52
25	Ehsan Tabari	373	1.04
Total Votes		35,957	100
