= 1923 in Iran =

- Decades
- See also: Other events of 1923; Years in Iran

The following lists events that happened during 1923 in Qajar era.

== Incumbents ==
- Monarch: Ahmad Shah Qajar
- Prime Minister: Ahmad Qavam (until February 15), Mostowfi ol-Mamalek (February 15 – June 15), Hassan Pirnia (June 15 – October 26), Reza Shah (starting October 26)

== Events ==
- May 25 – 1923 Torbat-e Heydarieh earthquake.
- November 10 – 1923 Persian legislative election.

== Births ==
- February 21 – Taqi Tabatabaei Qomi, Iranian grand ayatollah.
- March 1 – Morteza Hannaneh, Iranian Composer.
- April 13 – Ataullah Behmanesh, Iranian journalist.
- April 13 – Hassan Ali Mansur, former Iranian Prime Minister.
- April 13 – Mohammad Jafar Jafari Langarudi, Iranian lawyer.
- May 3 – Reza Arham Sadr, Iranian actor.
- May 5 – Mohammad Yeganeh, Persian politician.
- May 15 – Gholam Reza Pahlavi, Persian royal.
- May 15 – Peter Avery, British scholar.
- May 19 – Abdolhossein Zarrinkoob, Iranian professor of Persian culture and literature.
- June 1 – Mohammad-Amin Riahi, Iranian historian.
- June 25 – Jamshid Amouzegar, Iranian politician.
- June 27 – Reza Naji (Iranian general), Iranian military personnel.
- July 23 – Manouchehr Taslimi, Iranian member of government and academic.
- August 7 – Paulus Khofri, Assyrian composer and lyricist.
- August 13 – Moslem Malakouti, Iranian cleric.
- August 27 – Yaghoub Ali Shourvarzi, Iranian sport wrestler.
- September 24 – Samin Baghtcheban, Iranian musician, poet, translator and writer.
- October 2 – Jack Dellal, British banker.
- October 22 – Samuel Khachikian, Iranian film director.
- October 26 – Saboktakin Saloor, Persian writer.
- December 7 – Ziaeddin Shademan, Iranian sportsperson and politician.
- December 11 – Farhang Mehr, Iranian politician.
- December 19 – Monir Vakili, Iranian soprano.
- ? – Abbas Katouzian, Iranian artist.
- ? – Ahmad Mojtahedi Tehrani, Iranian religious servant.
- ? – Ali Golzadeh Ghafouri, Iranian writer and faculty.
- ? – Ali Khavari, Iranian politician.
- ? – Ali Neshat, Mager General, commander of Imperial Guard of His Imperial Majesty Mohammad Reza Pahlavi.
- ? – Baba Mardoukh Rohanee, Iranian religious scholar, teacher, poet and historian.
- ? – Habibollah Chaichian, Iranian poet.
- ? – Hadi Rohani, Iranian Ayatollah.
- ? – Hasan Hazer Moshar, artist.
- ? – Houshang Beheshti, Iranian actor.
- ? – Jabbar Choheili, Mandaean priest in Iran.
- ? – Jalal Al-e-Ahmad, writer, thinker, and social and political critic.
- ? – Javad Saeed, Persian physician and politician.
- ? – Mehdi Haeri Yazdi, Iranian ayatollah.
- ? – Mohammad-Taqi Ja'fari, Iranian scholar and theologian.
- ? – Monir Shahroudy Farmanfarmaian, Contemporary Iranian artist, mosaic work.

== Deaths ==
- August 30 – Ahmad Khan Daryabeigi, Iranian admiral and politician.
