= Boroumand =

Boroumand, Boromand, Burumand or Borumand (Persian: برومند) is an Iranian or Persian surname that may refer to:

- Adib Boroumand (1924–2017), Iranian poet, politician, and lawyer
- Behrouz Boroumand, Iranian physician and political activist
- Habib Boromand Dashghapu (born 1961), Iranian shiite cleric and politician
- Manouchehr Boroumand (1934–2017), Iranian weightlifter
- Marzieh Boroumand (born 1951), Iranian actress, puppeteer, screenwriter and TV film director
- Masoud Boroumand (1928–2011), Iranian football player
- Parviz Boroumand (born 1972), Iranian football player
- Taraneh Boroumand, Iranian playwright, writer, poet, and translator

== See also ==
- Mahmudabad-e Borumand, a village in Iran
