= Raisi =

Raisi (Persian: رییسی and رئیسی) may refer to:

== Places ==
- Qaleh Raisi, a town in Kohgiluyeh and Boyer-Ahmad province, Iran
- Raisi, Razavi Khorasan, a village in Razavi Khorazan province, Iran
- Raisi, a village in Fars province, Iran, also romanized as Rais Yahya
- Raisi, a city in Sistan and Baluchestan province, Iran, also known as Deh-e Rais
- Raisi railway station, a train station in Laksar, Uttarakhand, India

== People with the name ==
- Ahmed Naser Al-Raisi (active from 1980), Emirati military general officer
- Ebrahim Raisi (1960–2024), Iranian principlist politician who served as president of Iran
- Heshmat Raisi (born 1945), Iranian communist
- Mansour Raisi (1928–1980), Iranian Olympic freestyle wrestler whose name is also romanized as Mansour Raeisi
- Rasoul Raisi (1924–2015), Iranian weightlifter whose name is also romanized as Rasoul Raeisi

== See also ==
- Rais (disambiguation)
