= Baha ol Din =

Baha ol Din بهائالدين
- Village
- Location within Iran
- Coordinates: 27°49′33″N 60°57′52″E
- Country: Iran
- Province: Sistan and Baluchestan
- County: Khash
- Bakhsh: Irandegan
- Rural District: Kahnuk

Population (2006)
  - Total: 15
- Time zone: UTC+3:30 (IRST)
  - Summer (DST): UTC+4:30 (IRDT)

Baha ol Din (Persian: بهائالدين, also Romanized as Bahā’ ol Dīn; also known as Bahādīnī) is a village in Kahnuk Rural District, Irandegan District, Khash County, Sistan and Baluchestan Province, Iran. At the 2006 census, its population was 15, in 4 families.
