= Chegerd, Khash =

Chegerd چگرد
- Village
- Location within Iran
- Coordinates: 27°46′24″N 60°59′04″E
- Country: Iran
- Province: Sistan and Baluchestan
- County: Khash
- Bakhsh: Irandegan
- Rural District: Kahnuk

Population (2006)
  - Total: 288
- Time zone: UTC+3:30 (IRST)
  - Summer (DST): UTC+4:30 (IRDT)

Chegerd (Persian: چگرد; also known as Chederg) is a village in Kahnuk Rural District, Irandegan District, Khash County, Sistan and Baluchestan province, Iran. At the 2006 census, its population was 288, in 69 families.
