= Hitgar =

Hitgar هيتگر
- Village
- Location within Iran
- Coordinates: 27°33′00″N 61°01′00″E
- Country: Iran
- Province: Sistan and Baluchestan
- County: Khash
- Bakhsh: Irandegan
- Rural District: Irandegan

Population (2006)
  - Total: 285
- Time zone: UTC+3:30 (IRST)
  - Summer (DST): UTC+4:30 (IRDT)

Hitgar (Persian: هيتگر, also Romanized as Hītgar; also known as Hītkar-e Bālā) is a village located in Irandegan Rural District, Irandegan District, Khash County, Sistan and Baluchestan Province, Iran. According to the 2006 census, it has a population of 285, these number is distributed in 64 families.
