= Kalleh Garmak =

Kalleh Garmak كله گرمك
- Village
- Location within Iran
- Coordinates: 27°49′00″N 60°57′00″E
- Country: Iran
- Province: Sistan and Baluchestan
- County: Khash
- Bakhsh: Irandegan
- Rural District: Kahnuk

Population (2006)
  - Total: 46
- Time zone: UTC+3:30 (IRST)
  - Summer (DST): UTC+4:30 (IRDT)

Kalleh Garmak (Persian: كله گرمك; also known as Kalleh Garmak-e Bālā) is a village in Kahnuk Rural District, Irandegan District, Khash County, Sistan and Baluchestan Province, Iran. At the 2006 census, its population was 46, in 14 families.
