= Gari Dasht Kuh =

Gari Dasht Kuh گري دشتكوه
- Village
- Country: Iran
- Province: Sistan and Baluchestan
- County: Khash
- Bakhsh: Irandegan
- Rural District: Kahnuk

Population (2006)
  - Total: 24
- Time zone: UTC+3:30 (IRST)
  - Summer (DST): UTC+4:30 (IRDT)

Gari Dasht Kuh (Persian: گري دشتكوه, also Romanized as Garī Dasht Kūh) is a village in Kahnuk Rural District, Irandegan District, Khash County, Sistan and Baluchestan Province, Iran. At the 2006 census, its population was 24, in 6 families.
