= Gavatamak =

Gavatamak (Persian: گواتامك) may refer to:

- Gavatamak, Khash
- Gavatamak (27°32′ N 61°20′ E), Khash
