= Dakab-e Rughan =

Dakab-e Rughan دك اب روغن
- Village
- Country: Iran
- Province: Sistan and Baluchestan
- County: Khash
- Bakhsh: Irandegan
- Rural District: Irandegan

Population (2006)
  - Total: 40
- Time zone: UTC+3:30 (IRST)
  - Summer (DST): UTC+4:30 (IRDT)

Dakab-e Rughan (Persian: دك اب روغن, also Romanized as Dakāb-e Rūghan) is a village in Irandegan Rural District, Irandegan District, Khash County, Sistan and Baluchestan Province, Iran. At the 2006 census, its population was 40, in 10 families.
