= Dak Jamal =

Dak Jamal دك جمال
- Village
- Location within Iran
- Coordinates: 27°41′49″N 60°57′23″E
- Country: Iran
- Province: Sistan and Baluchestan
- County: Khash
- Bakhsh: Irandegan
- Rural District: Kahnuk

Population (2006)
  - Total: 29
- Time zone: UTC+3:30 (IRST)
  - Summer (DST): UTC+4:30 (IRDT)

Dak Jamal (Persian: دك جمال, also Romanized as Dak Jamāl) is a village in Kahnuk Rural District, Irandegan District, Khash County, Sistan and Baluchestan Province, Iran. Its population in 2006 was 29, in 5 families.
