= Rishpesh =

Rishpesh ريش پيش
- Village
- Location within Iran
- Coordinates: 27°34′02″N 61°06′33″E
- Country: Iran
- Province: Sistan and Baluchestan
- County: Khash
- Bakhsh: Irandegan
- Rural District: Kahnuk

Population (2006)
  - Total: 99
- Time zone: UTC+3:30 (IRST)
  - Summer (DST): UTC+4:30 (IRDT)

Rishpesh (Persian: ريش پيش, also Romanized as Rīshpesh) is a village in Kahnuk Rural District, Irandegan District, Khash County, Sistan and Baluchestan Province, Iran. At the 2006 census, its population was 99, in 24 families.
