= Qanat-e Mir Qalandar =

Qanat-e Mir Qalandar قنات ميرقلندر
- Village
- Location within Iran
- Coordinates: 27°39′43″N 61°02′19″E
- Country: Iran
- Province: Sistan and Baluchestan
- County: Khash
- Bakhsh: Irandegan
- Rural District: Kahnuk

Population (2006)
  - Total: 407
- Time zone: UTC+3:30 (IRST)
  - Summer (DST): UTC+4:30 (IRDT)

Qanat-e Mir Qalandar (Persian: قنات ميرقلندر, also Romanized as Qanāt-e Mīr Qalandar; also known as Mīr Qalandar) is a village in Kahnuk Rural District, Irandegan District, Khash County, Sistan and Baluchestan Province, Iran. At the 2006 census, its population was 407, in 83 families.
