= Zirogdan =

Zirogdan زيرگدان
- Village
- Location within Iran
- Coordinates: 27°50′27″N 60°58′47″E
- Country: Iran
- Province: Sistan and Baluchestan
- County: Khash
- Bakhsh: Irandegan
- Rural District: Kahnuk

Population (2006)
  - Total: 27
- Time zone: UTC+3:30 (IRST)
  - Summer (DST): UTC+4:30 (IRDT)

Zirogdan (Persian: زيرگدان, also Romanized as Zīrogdān; also known as Zīrokdān) is a village in Kahnuk Rural District, Irandegan District, Khash County, Sistan and Baluchestan Province, Iran. At the 2006 census, its population was 27, in 7 families.
