= Dasht Kuh-e Anjirak =

Dasht Kuh-e Anjirak دشت كوه انجيرك
- Village
- Country: Iran
- Province: Sistan and Baluchestan
- County: Khash
- Bakhsh: Irandegan
- Rural District: Kahnuk

Population (2006)
  - Total: 18
- Time zone: UTC+3:30 (IRST)
  - Summer (DST): UTC+4:30 (IRDT)

Dasht Kuh-e Anjirak (Persian: دشت كوه انجيرك, also Romanized as Dasht Kūh-e Ānjīrak) is a village in Kahnuk Rural District, Irandegan District, Khash County, Sistan and Baluchestan Province, Iran. At the 2006 census, its population was 18, in 4 families.
