= Sorkh Gazi, Khash =

Sorkh Gazi سرخ گزي
- Village
- Location within Iran
- Coordinates: 27°31′06″N 61°11′24″E
- Country: Iran
- Province: Sistan and Baluchestan
- County: Khash
- Bakhsh: Irandegan
- Rural District: Kahnuk

Population (2006)
  - Total: 204
- Time zone: UTC+3:30 (IRST)
  - Summer (DST): UTC+4:30 (IRDT)

Sorkh Gazi (Persian: سرخ گزي, also Romanized as Sorkh Gazī) is a village in Kahnuk Rural District, Irandegan District, Khash County, Sistan and Baluchestan Province, Iran. At the 2006 census, its population was 204, in 37 families.
