= Bala Qaleh =

Bala Qaleh بالاقلعه
- Village
- Country: Iran
- Province: Sistan and Baluchestan
- County: Khash
- Bakhsh: Irandegan
- Rural District: Irandegan

Population (2006)
  - Total: 111
- Time zone: UTC+3:30 (IRST)
  - Summer (DST): UTC+4:30 (IRDT)

Bala Qaleh (Persian: بالاقلعه, also Romanized as Bālā Qal‘eh) is a village in Irandegan Rural District, Irandegan District, Khash County, Sistan and Baluchestan Province, Iran. At the 2006 census, its population was 111, in 24 families.
