= Del Morad =

Del Morad دلمراد
- Village
- Country: Iran
- Province: Sistan and Baluchestan
- County: Khash
- Bakhsh: Irandegan
- Rural District: Kahnuk

Population (2006)
  - Total: 19
- Time zone: UTC+3:30 (IRST)
  - Summer (DST): UTC+4:30 (IRDT)

Del Morad (Persian: دلمراد(مادني), also Romanized as Del Morād; also known as Mādenī) is a village in Kahnuk Rural District, Irandegan District, Khash County, Sistan and Baluchestan Province, Iran. At the 2006 census, its population was 19, in 4 families.
