= Nimgan =

Nimgan نيمگان
- Village
- Location within Iran
- Coordinates: 27°38′07″N 60°54′53″E
- Country: Iran
- Province: Sistan and Baluchestan
- County: Khash
- Bakhsh: Irandegan
- Rural District: Irandegan

Population (2006)
  - Total: 37
- Time zone: UTC+3:30 (IRST)
  - Summer (DST): UTC+4:30 (IRDT)

Nimgan (Persian: نيمگان, also Romanized as Nīmgān) is a village in Irandegan Rural District, Irandegan District, Khash County, Sistan and Baluchestan Province, Iran. At the 2006 census, its population was 37, in 7 families.

This village is in the Irandegan Rural District, Irandegan District, Khash County, Sistan and Baluchestan Province.
