= Kahurak, Khash =

Village in Sistan and Baluchestan province

Kahurak كهورك
- Village
- Location within Iran
- Coordinates: 27°52′01″N 60°56′20″E
- Country: Iran
- Province: Sistan and Baluchestan
- County: Khash
- Bakhsh: Irandegan
- Rural District: Kahnuk

Population (2006)
  - Total: 47
- Time zone: UTC+3:30 (IRST)
  - Summer (DST): UTC+4:30 (IRDT)

Kahurak (Persian: كهورك, also Romanized as Kahūrak) is a village in Kahnuk Rural District, Irandegan District, Khash County, Sistan and Baluchestan Province, Iran. At the 2006 census, the village had a population of 47 people, living in 11 families.
