= Damikan =

Damikan دميكان
- Village
- Location within Iran
- Coordinates: 27°33′39″N 61°02′50″E
- Country: Iran
- Province: Sistan and Baluchestan
- County: Khash
- Bakhsh: Irandegan
- Rural District: Irandegan

Population (2006)
  - Total: 59
- Time zone: UTC+3:30 (IRST)
  - Summer (DST): UTC+4:30 (IRDT)

Damikan (Persian: دميكان, also Romanized as Damīkān; also known as Damanīkān) is a village in Irandegan Rural District, Irandegan District, Khash County, Sistan and Baluchestan Province, Iran. At the 2006 census, its population was 59, in 11 families.
