= Deh Qola =

Deh Qola ده قلا
- Village
- Location within Iran
- Coordinates: 27°33′33″N 61°00′31″E
- Country: Iran
- Province: Sistan and Baluchestan
- County: Khash
- Bakhsh: Irandegan
- Rural District: Kahnuk

Population (2006)
  - Total: 49
- Time zone: UTC+3:30 (IRST)
  - Summer (DST): UTC+4:30 (IRDT)

Deh Qola (Persian: ده قلا, also Romanized as Deh Qolā; also known as Dehqa‘leh) is a village in Kahnuk Rural District, Irandegan District, Khash County, Sistan and Baluchestan Province, Iran. At the 2006 census, its population was 49, in 11 families.
