= Sharaf ol Din =

Sharaf ol Din شرف الدين
- Village
- Location within Iran
- Coordinates: 27°41′55″N 61°04′12″E
- Country: Iran
- Province: Sistan and Baluchestan
- County: Khash
- Bakhsh: Irandegan
- Rural District: Kahnuk

Population (2006)
  - Total: 31
- Time zone: UTC+3:30 (IRST)
  - Summer (DST): UTC+4:30 (IRDT)

Sharaf ol Din (Persian: شرف الدين, also Romanized as Sharaf ol Dīn; also known as Sharaf od Dīn) is a village in Kahnuk Rural District, Irandegan District, Khash County, Sistan and Baluchestan Province, Iran. At the 2006 census, its population was 31, in 5 families.
