= Nilgan =

Nilgan نيلگان
- Village
- Location within Iran
- Coordinates: 27°32′13″N 61°11′34″E
- Country: Iran
- Province: Sistan and Baluchestan
- County: Khash
- Bakhsh: Irandegan
- Rural District: Kahnuk

Population (2006)
  - Total: 173
- Time zone: UTC+3:30 (IRST)
  - Summer (DST): UTC+4:30 (IRDT)

Nilgan (Persian: نيلگان, also Romanized as Nīlgān) is a village in Kahnuk Rural District, Irandegan District, Khash County, Sistan and Baluchestan Province, Iran. At the 2006 census, its population was 173, in 41 families.
