= Irandegan Castle =

Castle in Khash County, Iran

- قلعه ایرندگان
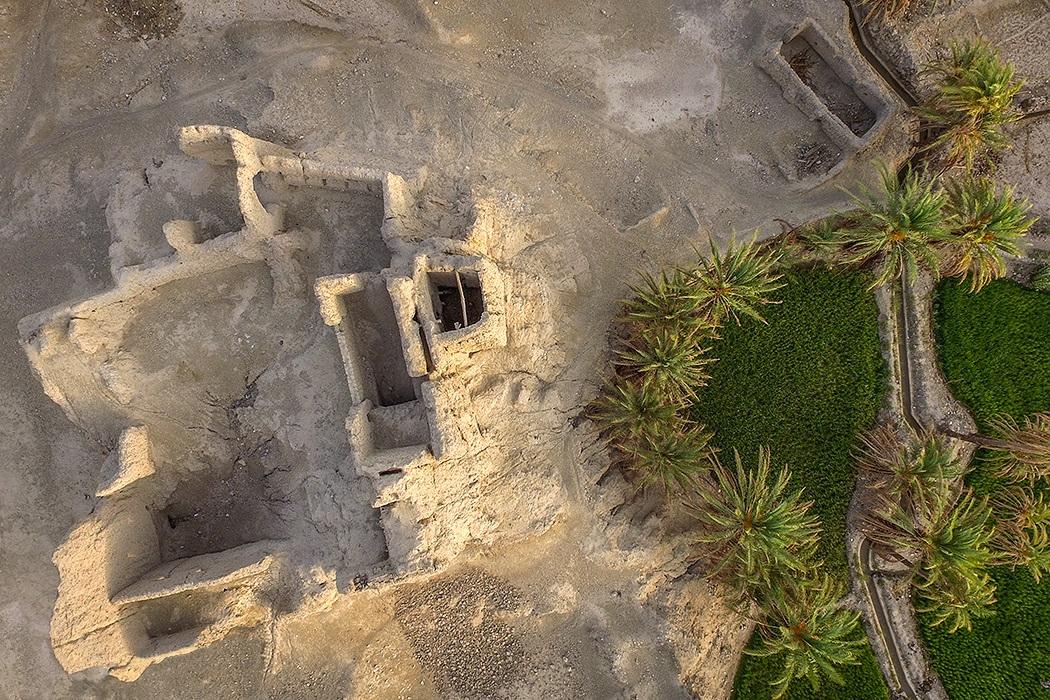
- Interactive map of the Irandegan Castle area

General information
- Type: Castle
- Architectural style: Iranian
- Location: Deh Qaleh, Iran
- Coordinates: 27.5598°N 61.0107°E

Irandegan Castle is a castle in Irandegan District, Khash County, Iran, and is one of the attractions of Khash County. This castle was built by the Qajar dynasty.
