= Gat Rais Golestan =

Gat Rais Golestan گت رئيس گلستان
- Village
- Country: Iran
- Province: Sistan and Baluchestan
- County: Khash
- Bakhsh: Irandegan
- Rural District: Kahnuk

Population (2006)
  - Total: 51
- Time zone: UTC+3:30 (IRST)
  - Summer (DST): UTC+4:30 (IRDT)

Gat Rais Golestan (Persian: گت رئيس گلستان, also Romanized as Gat Ra’īs Golestān) is a village in Kahnuk Rural District, Irandegan District, Khash County, Sistan and Baluchestan Province, Iran. At the 2006 census, its population was 51, in 13 families.
