= Introduction to the Science of Law =

1968 book by Nasser Katouzian

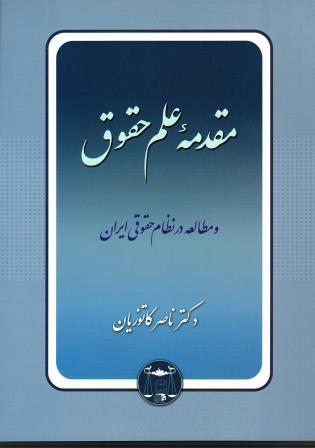
- Introduction to the science of law cover
- Author: Nasser Katouzian
- Original title: Introduction to the Science of law & A Survey of the Iranian Legal System
- Language: Persian
- Genre: Legal
- Publisher: Eghbaal; Beh Nashr; Bahman Borna; Ganje Danesh (latest publisher)
- Publication date: 1968
- Publication place: Iran
- Pages: 374
- ISBN: 978-6-006-24469-3

Introduction to the Science of Law (Persian: مقدمه علم حقوق) is the name of a legal book by Nasser Katouzian, an Iranian academic, writer and jurist, which is taught in many Iranian universities.
