= Dadkan =

Dadkan may refer to:

- Mohammad Dadkan (b. 1953), Iranian footballer
- Dadkan, Iran, a village in Sistan and Baluchestan Province
- Dadkan, Qazvin, a village in Qazvin Province
