= Kerstan =

Kerstan كرستان
- Village
- Location within Iran
- Coordinates: 27°30′43″N 61°05′28″E
- Country: Iran
- Province: Sistan and Baluchestan
- County: Khash
- Bakhsh: Irandegan
- Rural District: Kahnuk

Population (2006)
  - Total: 42
- Time zone: UTC+3:30 (IRST)
  - Summer (DST): UTC+4:30 (IRDT)

Kerstan (Persian: كرستان, also Romanized as Kerstān; also known as Kerīstān) is a village in Kahnuk Rural District, Irandegan District, Khash County, Sistan and Baluchestan Province, Iran. At the 2006 census, its population was 42, in 7 families.
