= Keristan =

Keristan may refer to:

- Kerista, a religion
- Keristan, Iran, a village
