= Gavatamak, Kahnuk =

Gavatamak گواتامك
- Village
- Location within Iran
- Coordinates: 27°31′52″N 61°20′00″E
- Country: Iran
- Province: Sistan and Baluchestan
- County: Khash
- Bakhsh: Irandegan
- Rural District: Kahnuk

Population (2006)
  - Total: 147
- Time zone: UTC+3:30 (IRST)
  - Summer (DST): UTC+4:30 (IRDT)

Gavatamak (Persian: گواتامك, also Romanized as Gavātāmak) is a village in Kahnuk Rural District, Irandegan District, Khash County, Sistan and Baluchestan Province, Iran. At the 2006 census, its population was 147, in 36 families.
