= Espah =

Village in Sistan and Baluchestan province, Iran

Espah Persian: اسپه
- Village
- Location within Iran
- Coordinates: 27°50′13″N 61°01′03″E
- Country: Iran
- Province: Sistan and Baluchestan
- County: Khash
- District: Irandegan
- Rural District: Kahnuk

Population (2016)
  - Total: 811
- Time zone: UTC+3:30 (IRST)

Espah (Persian: اسپه) (Note: Also romanized as Espeh) is a village in Kahnuk Rural District of Irandegan District, Khash County, Sistan and Baluchestan province, Iran.

== Demographics ==
=== Population ===
At the time of the 2006 National Census, the village's population was 587 in 123 households. The following census in 2011 counted 413 people in 90 households. The 2016 census measured the population of the village as 811 people in 239 households. It was the most populous village in its rural district.
