= Taslimi =

Taslimi (Persian: تسلیمی) is a surname of Iranian origin. Notable people with the surname include:

- Manouchehr Taslimi (1923−1998), Iranian Professor and Member of Government.
- Reza Taslimi, Iranian intelligence officer involved in assassinations of political dissidents.
- Susan Taslimi (born 1950) is an Iranian actress, film director, theatre director, and screenwriter.
