= Saber Mohammadzadeh =

Iranian politician

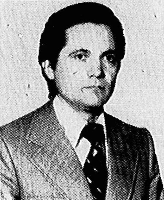
- Mohammadzadeh in 1979
- Died: 1988; Iran
- Cause of death: Execution by hanging
- Political party: Tudeh Party

Saber Mohammadzadeh (Persian: صابر محمدزاده) was an Iranian communist politician.

In 1966, he was arrested by the government and the Pahlavi dynasty courts sentenced him to death.

Due to protests from international communist parties, the sentence was reduced to life imprisonment.

After the Iranian Revolution, he ran for an Assembly of Experts for Constitution seat from Tehran constituency.

Mohammadzadeh was a victim of the 1988 executions of Iranian political prisoners.
