= Mohammad-Ali Amoui =

Iranian politician

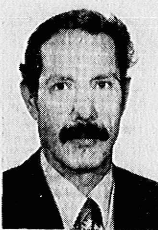
- Amouyi in 1979
- Born: 1923 (age 102–103); Kermanshah, Iran
- Political party: Tudeh Party
- Children: 1 daughter

Details
- Date apprehended: 1954–1979; 1983–1995
- Military career
- Other name: Dr. Tabrizi
- Education: Officers' School
- Branch: Imperial Iranian Army
- Rank: Captain

Mohammad-Ali Amoui (Persian: محمدعلی عمویی) is an Iranian communist politician and former military officer.

== Biography ==
He was a member of the Tudeh Military Network that was uncovered in 1954, for which he spent 25 years in prison until 1979. Following the Iranian Revolution, he was released and became a member of the central committee of the Tudeh Party of Iran, before unsuccessfully running for an Assembly of Experts for Constitution seat from Tehran constituency. He was imprisoned again in 1983.
