= Deh Qaleh =

Village in Sistan and Baluchestan province, Iran

Deh Qaleh Persian: ده قلعه
- Village
- Location within Iran
- Coordinates: 27°33′39″N 61°00′26″E
- Country: Iran
- Province: Sistan and Baluchestan
- County: Khash
- District: Irandegan
- Rural District: Irandegan

Population (2016)
  - Total: 373
- Time zone: UTC+3:30 (IRST)

Deh Qaleh (Persian: ده قلعه) (Note: Also romanized as Deh Qal’eh and Deh-e Qal‘eh) is a village in, and the capital of, Irandegan Rural District of Irandegan District, Khash County, Sistan and Baluchestan province, Iran.

== Demographics ==
=== Population ===
At the time of the 2006 National Census, the village's population was 225 in 58 households. The following census in 2011 counted 193 people in 52 households. The 2016 census measured the population of the village as 373 people in 181 households.
