= Nasser Katouzian =

Iranian lawyer (1931–2014)

Amir Nasser Katouzian
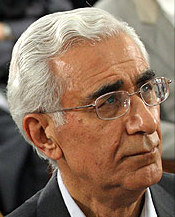
- Born: 23 April 1931; Tehran, Iran
- Died: 2 September 2014 (aged 83); Tehran, Iran
- Resting place: Behesht-e Zahra Cemetery
- Education: Faculty of Law and Political Science at University of Tehran; University of Tehran
- Occupations: Academic, writer, Jurist, Lawyer
- Title: 'Founding Father of Modern Iranian Legal Studies'
- Spouse: Aghdas Katouzian
- Children: 2 (Bahram, Behzad)
- Relatives: Asghar Sayyed Javadi (brother-in-law)
- Awards: Order of Culture and Art (1st Order)
- Website: https://lawpol.ut.ac.ir/en/~katoozian

Amir Nasser Katouzian (Persian: امیرناصر کاتوزیان; 23 April 1931 – 2 September 2014) was an Iranian jurist, lawyer and emeritus at the University of Tehran. He is considered as the father of Iranian Law. Most of his books are considered as the main sources of civil law courses for law students. On February 2, 2005, Mohammad Khatami, the president of Iran at the time, awarded him the Order of Culture and Art. Katouzian was regarded a prominent national figure and was a member of the committee in charge of writing a draft for the Constitution of the Islamic Republic of Iran, along with Hassan Habibi, Jafari Langarudi, Nasser Minachi and Ahmad Sayyed Javadi. He then ran for an Assembly of Experts for Constitution seat from Tehran constituency, however he was not elected. Katouzian was purged during Iranian Cultural Revolution and removed from his professorship position. Later, he was invited to assume his own position again.
