= Dadkan, Iran =

Village in Sistan and Baluchestan province, Iran

Dadkan Persian: دادكان
- Village
- Location within Iran
- Coordinates: 27°36′03″N 60°57′34″E
- Country: Iran
- Province: Sistan and Baluchestan
- County: Khash
- District: Irandegan
- Rural District: Irandegan

Population (2016)
  - Total: 542
- Time zone: UTC+3:30 (IRST)

Dadkan (Persian: دادكان) (Note: Also romanized as Dādkān; also known as Dad Gan, Dād Khān, and Dādkān-e Soflá) is a village in Irandegan Rural District of Irandegan District, Khash County, Sistan and Baluchestan province, Iran.

== Demographics ==
=== Population ===
At the time of the 2006 National Census, the village's population was 800 in 171 households. The following census in 2011 counted 172 people in 50 households. The 2016 census measured the population of the village as 542 people in 180 households. It was the most populous village in its rural district.
