= Asef Razmdideh =

Iranian politician and trade unionist

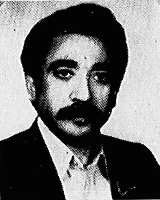
- Razmdideh in 1979
- Born: Ardabil
- Died: 1988; Iran
- Cause of death: Execution
- Political party: Tudeh Party

Asef Razmdideh (Persian: آصف رزم‌دیده) was an Iranian communist politician and trade unionist.

He served as the general-secretary of the Consultative Committee for the creation of the General Union of Iranian Workers as of 1979, and was a member of the central committee of Tudeh Party of Iran.

In 1966, along with several members of Tudeh, he was arrested and sentenced to death by Pahlavi dynasty. However following international opposition from communist parties, the sentence was reduced to life imprisonment. He remained imprisoned until 1979. Shortly after the Iranian Revolution, he ran for an Assembly of Experts for Constitution seat from Tehran constituency on behalf of Tudeh. In 1983, he was arrested and imprisoned in Evin Prison by the Islamic Republic government. His name has been recorded as one of the victims of 1988 executions of Iranian political prisoners.
