= Roghieh Daneshgari =

Iranian communist

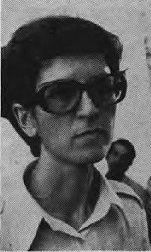
- Daneshgari at University of Tehran, 1979
- Political party: OIPFG (before 1980); OIPFG (Majority) (after 1980)

Roghieh "Faran" Daneshgari (Persian: رقیه دانشگری) is an Iranian communist who was a member of the Organization of Iranian People's Fedai Guerrillas.

== Career ==
Daneshgari was a guerilla fighting against Pahlavi dynasty, however she was arrested in a safehouse. According to memoirs of Ahmad Ahmad, SAVAK agents told him that when they arrested Daneshgari, she resisted tortures and did not talk during interrogations. However, because she had trusted an undercover agent impersonating a friend and given him a phone number to inform her family, the line was tapped and several others were arrested. After the Iranian Revolution, she was released from prison and ran for an Assembly of Experts for Constitution seat from Tehran constituency, garnering 115,334 votes. Though Daneshgari was the most-voted leftist candidate, she was not elected.

In 1980, along with Mostafa Madani she tried to convince the minority faction of the OIPFG to prevent split, but to no avail. After the schism, Daneshgari a member of the central committee in the majority faction.

Scholar Haideh Moghissi argues that speeches made by Daneshgari during her 1979 campaign reflects "deficiency" in understanding gender issues in contemporary Iran, because she did not criticize Constitution of the Islamic Republic of Iran for emphasizing motherhood and their role in reproduction and instead made remarks about why women could be as courageous as men despite gender stereotypes.
