= Ataullah Behmanesh =

Iranian journalist and athlete

Ataullah Behmanesh عطاءالله بهمنش
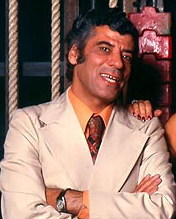
- Atta Behmanesh (sport anchor) on Iranian state TV
- Born: April 13, 1923; Kermanshah, Sublime State of Iran
- Died: July 2, 2017 (aged 94); Tehran, Islamic Republic of Iran
- Other name: Atta
- Known for: Wrestler, Sports Journalist and Presenter

Ataullah Behmanesh (Persian: عطاءالله بهمنش; April 13, 1923 – July 2, 2017) was an Iranian radio and TV sportscaster, an Olympian and a sports journalist. Behmanesh was one of the oldest and most prominent Iranian sports reporters. He conducted the first live sports report in Iran over the radio in 1958 during Iranian and Iraqi national sport of athletics competitions. Behmanesh, who was 94 years old, was not in good health for years due to illness. Ali Daei and Mehdi Taj were the first to react to his death.

Atta wrote a number of books, including "FIFA World Cup from the beginning to 2002" and "Olympic Games from the beginning to the present".
