= Yahya Nouri =

Yahya Nasiri
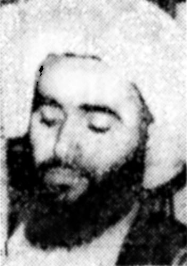
- Nasiri in 1979
- Born: Yahya Nasiri; Mazandaran, Iran
- Other name: Yahya Nuri
- Education: University of Tehran
- Political party: Combatant Clergy Association

Yahya Nasiri (Persian: یحیی نصیری), commonly known as Yahya Nouri, was an Iranian Shia cleric and missionary activist.

== Activities ==
Nasiri held a PhD from the University of Tehran, where he also taught. He was famed for having made many Christians converts to Islam. According to Mehdi Abedi, "[i]n reality, hippies would be picked up in the streets and taken to him; he would talk to them about Islam, give them books, have their photo taken, and claim to have converted them." A rich person, he owned a large library. He opposed the Pahlavi dynasty, and was critical of Israel and the Baháʼí Faith, having been quoted "from scientific and Islamic point of view, we regard the Embassy of Israel and the Haziratu'l-Quds Baháʼí Centre as one and the same". In September 1978, he was arrested by the martial law authorities. According to Houchang Nahavandi, "He was arrested for causing incitement of public disorder and of acts of arson in public places—banks, cinemas, department stores, government buildings. At his residence the authorities had found many passports belonging to different Arab countries, a substantial amount of money and documents showing the prior planning of the 1978 Black Friday." In 1981, Agence France-Presse reported that he was "considered one of the country's most respected religious figures".

== Bibliography ==
- Finality of Prophethood in Islam: Critical Analysis of Babism, Baha'ism and Qadiyanism, Royston Publishers, 1988, ISBN 9780946706501
- Legal and Political Structure of an Islamic State: The Implications for Iran and Pakistan, Royston Publishers, 1987, ISBN 094670631X (co-authored with Sayed Hassan Amin)
- Islam: A Final, Perfected & Universal Religion, Islamic Cultural Center, 1982
