= Ali-Mohammad Arab =

Politician

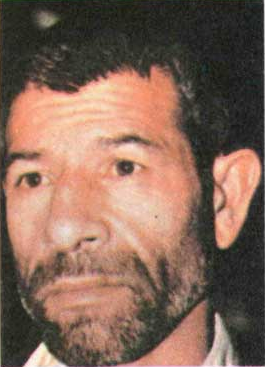

Member of Assembly of Experts for Constitution
- In office 15 August 1979 – 15 November 1979
- Constituency: Tehran Province
- Majority: 1,305,136 (51.68%)

Personal details
- Born: c. 1935 (age 90–91) Varamin, Iran
- Party: Islamic Republican Party
- Other political affiliations: Worker House
- Occupation: Laborer

Ali-Mohammad Arab (Persian: علی‌محمد عرب) is an Iranian worker elected to the 73-seats Assembly of Experts for Constitution in 1979.
