= Mahmudabad-e Borumand =

Mahmudabad-e Borumand محمودابادبرومند
- Village
- Location within Iran
- Coordinates: 28°31′29″N 57°49′07″E
- Country: Iran
- Province: Kerman
- County: Anbarabad
- Bakhsh: Central
- Rural District: Mohammadabad

Population (2006)
  - Total: 284
- Time zone: UTC+3:30 (IRST)
  - Summer (DST): UTC+4:30 (IRDT)

Mahmudabad-e Borumand (Persian: محمودابادبرومند, also Romanized as Maḩmūdābād-e Borūmand; also known as Maḩmūdābād) is a village in Mohammadabad Rural District, in the Central District of Anbarabad County, Kerman Province, Iran. At the 2006 census, its population was 284, in 59 families.
