= Baba Mardoukh Rohanee =

Iranian religious scholar and poet

Baba Mardoukh Rouhani (Kurdish: بابا مەردووخی ڕۆحانی; Baba Merdûxê Rûhanî) was an Islamic academic. He was born in 1923 in the village of Kashtar, Sanandaj, Kurdistan province, Iran. He received his early education from his father, Sheykh Habeeb Ollah Modarrisi, later moving to Sanandaj, where he was instructed by several Islamic sciences professors. Baba Mardoukh's notable works were in the fields of fiqh, tafsir, logic, and mathematics. One of his works, The History of Notable Kurds is widely regarded to be his best (Persian: تاریخ مشاهیر کرد), which he wrote in Persian. After finishing his studies in Islamic sciences in Kurdistan, he moved to Tehran, where he enrolled in Tehran University, where he met some prominent Persian professors like Badiozzaman Forouzanfar. After finishing his studies in Tehran he moved back to Sanandaj, where he taught in high-schools and wrote.

He died of cancer on January 17, 1989 and was buried in Sanandaj.
