= Monireh Gorji =

Iranian politician (1929–2025)

Monir Gorji

Member of Assembly of Experts for Constitution
- In office 15 August 1979 – 15 November 1979
- Constituency: Tehran Province
- Majority: 1,313,731 (52.02%)

Personal details
- Born: 1929 Tehran, Persia
- Died: 12 January 2025 (aged 95–96)
- Party: Islamic Republican Party
- Education: Khadijeh Kobra Seminary Institute for Women's Studies and Research
- Occupation: Teacher

Monir Gorji (Persian: منیره گرجی; 1929 – 12 January 2025) was an Iranian teacher. She was the only woman to be elected to the 73-seat Assembly of Experts for Constitution in 1979. The Assembly of Experts is a framework of Iran that is responsible for electing and overseeing the Supreme Leader. Gorji died on 12 January 2025.

== Works and contributions ==
Gorji's works and contributions have been part of different articles and academic sources, such as a 1980 article titled "Women in the Islamic Republic of Iran". She also contributed to Islamic Feminism in Iran, requoting and highlighting the importance of women's rights and roles in accordance to the Holy Quran, Mathew Pierce writes in "Remembering Fāṭimah: New Means of Legitimizing Female Authority in Contemporary Shīʿī Discourse." In stark contrast, however, Massoumeh Ebtekar and Monir Gorgi wrote in 1997 that Fāṭimah, the daughter of the Prophet, had fulfilled a “role in the highest level of decision making in the society of her time,” a position which was “Independent from that of her husband [ʿAlī ibn Abī Ṭālib].”3 The latter understanding of Fāṭimah represents a current trend among Shīʿī women and men to present the authoritative model of Fāṭimah as evidence of the right of women to assume positions of religious and political authority. It is an interpretation which is in tension with classical—Sunnī and Shīʿī—narratives of Fāṭimah, yet is born out of the same sources in interesting ways and with powerful results. Also, Monir Gorgi provided an in depth and forward-looking interpretation of Quranic texts particularly as related to the Noble Quran. Gorgi had an equalitarian perspective on Quranic narrations and provided a novel discourse on many stories of the Prophets including the story of Solomon and the Queen of Shiba or Bilqeys. Gorgi believed that the Quran introduces a model of successful governance and transformation for women as exemplified in the ability of the Queen of Shiba to avert war and to make peace after the rightful invitation of Solomon. Also Azadeh Kian refers to this treatise in her article "Gendered citizenship and the women’s movement in Iran": "Monir Gorgi, a renowned specialist of Islam, is one of the leading figures among them. She has a religious education and is the Director of the Centre for the Study and Research on Women’s Problems in Tehran. Gorgi’s reading of the Qur’an refutes the position of the traditional jurisprudence that forbids women’s access to leadership positions under the pretext that women are physically and morally weak. She analyzes the personality, opinion and governance of the queen of Sheba (Bilqeys) as reflected in the Qur’an and argues that, ‘although the Qur’an mentions only a few rulers, the queen of Sheba is among them and she is depicted as one of the most just and rationalist rulers. This alone shows that the Qur’an accepts the capacity of women to manage and to lead’. Gorgi therefore questions the pertinence of Islamic political jurisprudence for which manhood is one of the preconditions of Islamic leadership."

In the Journal Critique International Azadeh Kian-Thiébaut has an article entitled " Islamic Feminism in Iran: A New Form of Subjugation or the Emergence of Agency?" in which she makes the following statement concerning the views of Monir Gorgi :"Islamic feminists enjoy the support of women familiar with theology and interested in re-interpreting the Qur’an and the traditions to the advantage of women. Monir Gorgi is one such woman. An acknowledged specialist of Islam, she received a religious education and is now director of the Center for Study and Research in women’s issues in Teheran and was formerly director of Jame’at ol-Zahra, the theological school for women. Monir Gorgi rebuts the political position of Islamic jurisprudence that bars women from access to positions of political leadership on the basis of their supposed physical and intellectual frailty. Making reference to the Qur’an, she offers an analysis of the personality, beliefs and style of government of the Queen of Sheba (Belqeys), expressing her view as follows: “The Qur’an mentions only a very few political leaders, yet Belqeys is one of them. Furthermore, she is depicted as one of the most just and rational sovereigns. This is sufficient to show that the Qur’an accepts the natural and intrinsic capacity of women to manage and govern. In fact, Belqeys is not exceptional. She represents women as a whole. She has shown that women are not weaker than men in the matter of government, and that they can even be better than men, to the extent that the idea of justice was one of the characteristics of the reign of Belqeys.

As to the biological differences between men and women, Monir Gorgi observes that, in modern political systems, the predominance of technical knowledge and modern management has rendered obsolete the role of force in the exercise of power. Therefore, she questions the applicability of Islamic political jurisprudence, according to which being a man is a necessary condition for ruling a Muslim country." In 1995 Monir Gorgi and Masoumeh Ebtekar wrote an article on the elevated and independent status of the Virgin Mary in Farzaneh Journal of Women's Studies entitled: "A study of the life and status of the Virgin Mary (Mariam), the mother of Christ, in the Holy Quran the Chosen Woman"

Monir Gorgi co-founded the first non-governmental Center for Women's Studies and Research (1993) in Tehran and Farzaneh Journal of Women's Research (1995).
