= Hasan Hazer Moshar =

Iranian artist

Hasan Hazer Moshar (Persian: حسن حاضر مشار, 1923-2015) was an Iranian self-taught artist who was called "the father of self-taught arts". He was a painter and sculptor and was active until the last days of his life.

Hazer Moshar was born in Rasht, Iran in 1923. At the age of 16, he was apprenticed to an Armenian carpenter and began making furniture as his profession. He pursued it until 70 when he had an accident and slipped into a coma. After recovery, he took up painting. Over time, he also became a sculptor. Since he had no workshop, he started making sculptures on the sidewalk and presented them for sale on site. Afterwards, he was discovered by Kambiz Deram Bakhsh, an Iranian caricaturist. He was introduced to the Iranian artistic community and his works were displayed in several galleries in Tehran, including Saba Art and Culture Organization, as well as XVA Gallery in Dubai.

Though he had lost one of his eyes as a soldier in World War II, he had a keen eye in depicting nature and pursued it until his death. He learnt sculpture and painting by himself and, as a result, his works came purely out of his nature unaffected by the influence of academy and tradition. As Deram Bakhsh states, "Hazer Moshar is an old carpenter who did not attend academy and this might be his advantage." Also, literature had a great influence on him. Hazer Moshar was highly interested in Persian literature. He knew Ferdowsi's Shahnameh, and made use of its stories as sources of inspiration. Moshar himself once said, “The old stories are inspiration for my paintings. I make statues from the stories. I lived all my life with wood and by the wood.”

He died in 2015 at the age of 91 after a very brief hospitalization. He had always proclaimed his hatred of retirement and he was successful in not experiencing it. On January 5, 2015, the body of Hasan Hazer Moshar was laid to rest in The Artists Section of Behesht-e Zahra Cemetery in Tehran.
