= Abbas Katouzian =

Iranian artist (1923–2008)

Last image taken of Abbas Katouzian

Abbas Katouzian (1923 – April 12, 2008) was an Iranian painter and artist.

Born in Tehran, Katouzian studied art history during his childhood and chose Kamalolmolk as his mentor. He followed the latter in developing the realistic movement in Iran. His work was featured in five exhibitions in the United States, one in London, and two in France.

In 1973 Katouzian participated in a joint exhibition at the National Consultative Assembly with the works of Kamalolmolk. Katouzian's paintings have appeared in more than 200 magazines worldwide.

One of his most famous and most reproduced paintings is the "Kurdish girl".

Katouzian was in the middle of exhibiting in Tehran to showcase his fifty years of artistic creativity in April 2008 when he died in his home. He died in Tehran on April 12, 2008, aged 86.

== See also ==
- Iranian art
