= Ebrahim Karimabadi =

- ابراهیم کریم‌آبادی
- Born: 1917
- Died: c. 1980 (aged 62–63)
- Political party: National Front

Ebrahim Karimabadi (Persian: ابراهیم کریم‌آبادی) was an Iranian lawyer, journalist, and café owner.

He held a bachelor of law from University of Tehran and started his career in journalism in 1946. He owned a daily called Asnaf (lit. 'Guilds') and served as the director of another daily, Mashrutiyat (lit. 'Constitutionalism'). Karimabadi was head of the cafee- and teahouse owners' guild, and mobilized them in support of the government of Mohammad Mosaddegh. Along with Mohammad-Hassan Shamshiri, he was among the major bazaari leaders in the National Front.
