= Rais Yahya =

Rais Yahya رييس يحيي
- Village
- Location within Iran
- Coordinates: 27°18′26″N 53°15′44″E
- Country: Iran
- Province: Fars
- County: Lamerd
- Bakhsh: Central
- Rural District: Sigar

Population (2006)
  - Total: 191
- Time zone: UTC+3:30 (IRST)
  - Summer (DST): UTC+4:30 (IRDT)

Rais Yahya (Persian: رييس يحيي, also romanized as Ra’īs Yaḩyá; also known as Ra’īsī and Ra’īsī Yaḩyá) is a village in Sigar Rural District, in the Central District of Lamerd County, Fars province, Iran. At the 2006 census, its population was 191, in 39 families.
