= Fakhreddin Hejazi =

Iranian politician

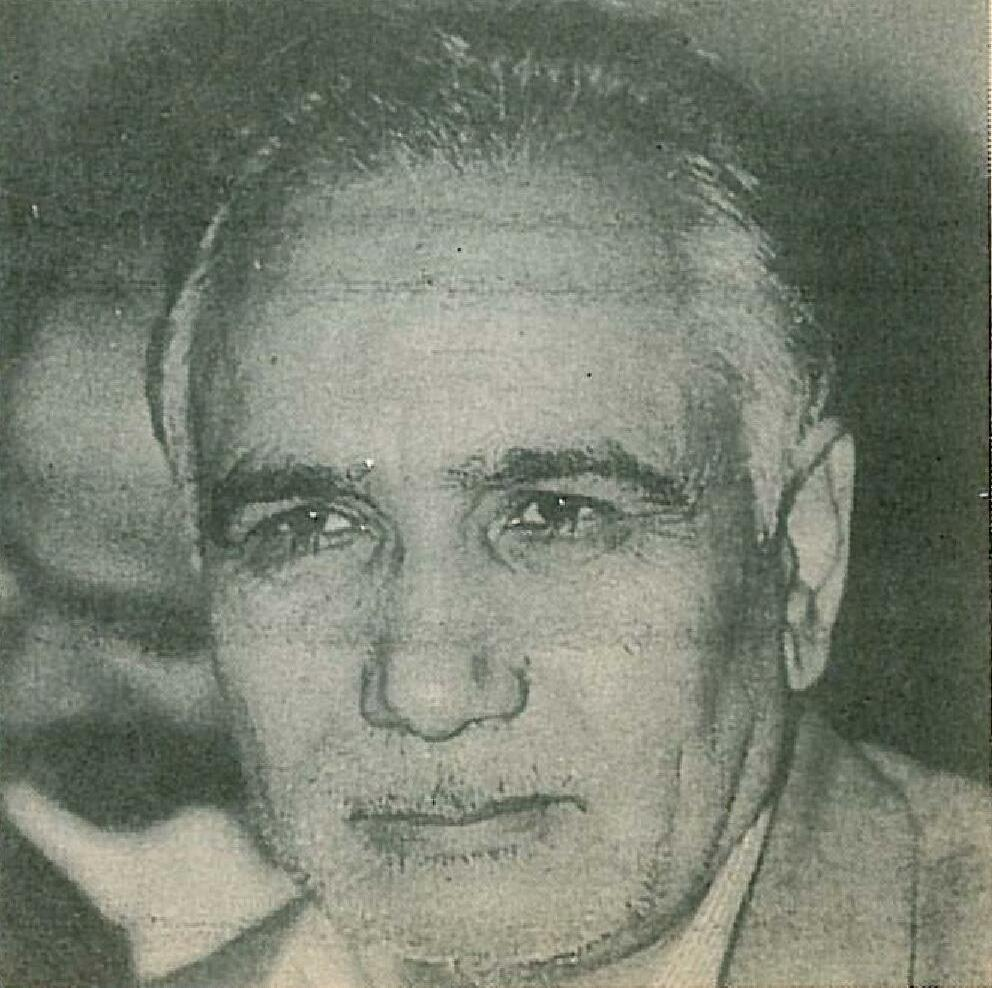

Member of the Parliament of Iran
- In office 28 May 1980 – 28 May 1992
- Constituency: Tehran, Rey and Shemiranat

Personal details
- Born: 1929
- Died: 2007 (aged 77–78)
- Party: Islamic Republican Party

Fakhreddin Hejazi (Persian: فخرالدین حجازی) was an Iranian orator and politician who represented Tehran, Rey and Shemiranat from 1980 to 1992, and was the most-voted deputy in the 1980 Iranian legislative election.

== Political positions ==
According to Ali Rahnema, Hejazi was "[a] one-time zealot sympathizer of Fada'iyan-e Islam and later one of the most popular speakers at Hosseiniyeh Ershad, before the arrival of Ali Shariati, Hejazi was a vibrant, moving and charismatic orator fond of creating an atmosphere of quasi-theatrical drama and passion play". He was a supporter of Ruhollah Khomeini and closely associated with the Islamic Republican Party.

Mehrzad Boroujerdi states that Hejazi was a religious intellectual who understood that he was to serve the clergy as a junior partner because he was a layman.

Robin Wright describes him as a "fiery hard-liner who had called for Nuremberg-type trials of the hostages in 1980". In a campaign speech for 1992 Iranian legislative election, he expressed his resentment of laissez-faire and advocated "trade with the Islamic government's control", while he opposed the foreign policy of the Association of Combatant Clerics.

Hejazi is known for his televised "unabashed flattery" of Khomeini, during which he was called "the light of God", "son of Imam Ali and the Prophet Muhammad", "the heir to all prophets and Imams" and "manifestation of the proof of God". Khomeini himself rebuffed the speech and said "I fear I would come to believe what Mr. Hejazi said about me."

Honorary titles
Preceded by Manouchehr Azmoun	First deputy of Tehran; 1980	Succeeded by Akbar Hashemi Rafsanjani
