= Taraneh Boroumand =

Iranian playwright, writer, poet and translator

- Born: Tehran, Iran
- Occupation(s): Playwright, writer, poet, translator
- Years active: 2000–present

Taraneh Boroumand (Persian: ترانه برومند) is an Iranian playwright, writer, poet, and translator. She is the author of a collection of short stories, a book of poetry, and three plays. She is best known for her theatrical debut Gereh-i dar Tār-o-Pūd-e Naqš ("A Knot in the Warp and Weft of a Design"), a play about a journey and decision through which one character ultimately finds herself and another loses himself. It made its debut at the 27th Fajr International Theater Festival in 2007 where it was selected as the Year’s Top Drama. The play went on to a successful run across Iran and neighboring countries.

== Early life ==
She was born in Tehran to a literary family. Her father was a librarian and historian. Her uncle Adib Boroumand was an Iranian poet, politician, lawyer, head of the Leadership Council, and Chairman of Central Council of the National Front of Iran.

== Bibliography ==
Plays

- 2007: A Knot in the Warp and Weft of a Design ("Gereh-i dar Tar-o-pood-e Yek Naghsh"), Namayesh Publication; ISBN 978-964-2747-57-3
- 2012: Swamp Lily ("Niloofar-e Mordab"), Afraz Publication; ISBN 978-964-7640-48-0
- 2013: Her Life ("Zendegi-e Ou"), Ava-ye Kelar Publication; ISBN 978-600-226-078-9

Poetry

- 2014: Pareha-ye Yad-e To, Negah Publication; ISBN 978-964-351-833-2

Short Stories

- 2011: The Enchantment of a Portrait; ISBN 2366120214; ISBN 978-2366120219

Translations

- 2010: Natasha, by Vladimir Nabokov, Nila Publication; ISBN 978-600-5140-97-2
- 2010: Fear Street, by R. L. Stine, Vida Publication; ISBN 978-964-2912-77-3
- 2011: The Table by the Window, by Terence Rattigan, Nila Publication; ISBN 978-600-122-034-0
- 2011: Table Number Seven, by Terence Rattigan, Nila Publication; ISBN 978-600-122-035-7
