= Houshang Beheshti =

Iranian actor

- هوشنگ بهشتی
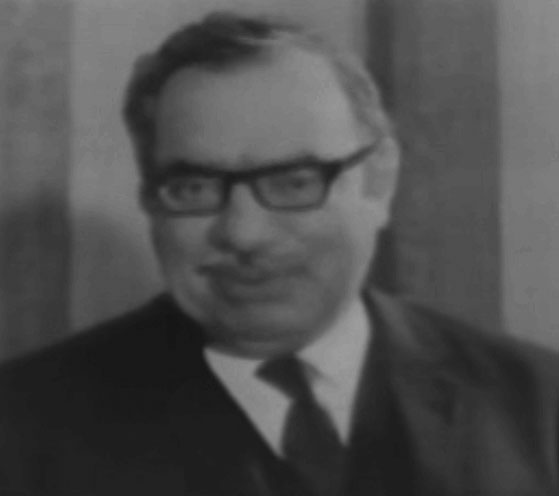
- Houshang Beheshti in 1970
- Born: 1923; Tehran, Iran
- Died: 1991 (aged 67–68); Tehran
- Occupation: actor
- Years active: 1953–1991

Houshang Beheshti (Persian: هوشنگ بهشتی; also Romanized as Hushang Beheshti; 1923, Tehran – 1991, Tehran) was an Iranian actor.

== Filmography ==
=== Cinema ===
- Fighting with Evil - 1953
- Returning to Life - 1957
- Beggars of Tehran - 1966
- Runaway from the Paradise - 1974
- Window - 1988
- Lovers - 1991
