= Habibollah Chaichian =

Iranian poet (1923–2017)

- حبیب‌الله چایچیان
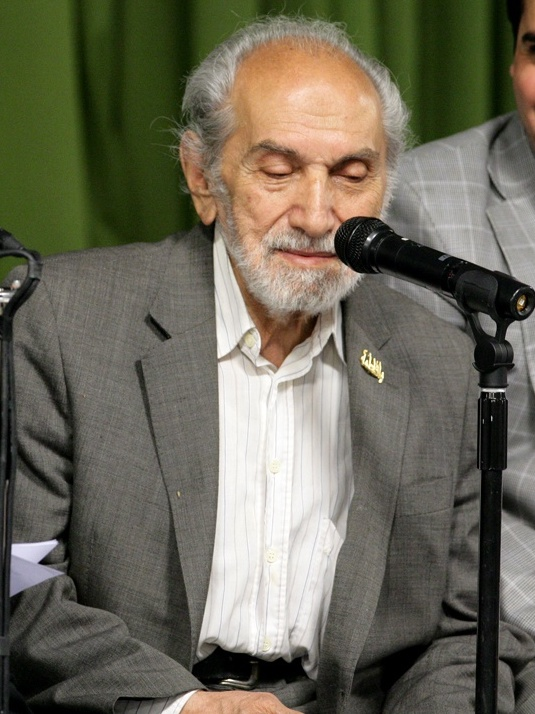
- Born: 1923; Tabriz
- Died: 30 November 2017 (aged 93–94); Tehran
- Resting place: Behesht Zahra, Tehran
- Occupation: Poet
- Writing career
- Language: Persian
- Years active: 1938 – 2017
- Genre: Religious poem
- Notable works: "Emshab Shahadatnameh Oshagh Emza Mi-shavad" and "Amadam ey Shaah Panaham Bedeh"

Habibollah Chaichian (Persian: حبیب‌الله چایچیان) (1923 – 30 November 2017) was an Iranian prominent poet known for religious and ritual poem.

== Pen name and selected work ==
His pen name (pseudonym) was Hesan (Persian: حسان) adopted from the name of a Sahabah in Islam. His favorite poetic form was Do-baytī but he had works in other Persian poetic forms including Mathnawi.

Chaichian had religious poem in Persian language with Arabic additives, in which several of them became significantly widespread in religious ceremonies in Iran and few other Persian-speaking countries. Two of his most well-known poems begin with the Matla: "Emshab Shahadatnameh Oshagh Emza Mi-shavad" (tonight, martyr merit-letter of God-lovers are being signed) for Imam Hossein and "Amadam ey Shaah Panaham Bedeh" (Here I have arrived your majesty, grant me asylum) for Imam Reza.

== Death and funeral ==
He died on Thursday 30 November 2017 at age 94 at Tehran's Shohaday-e Tajrish Hospital. His funeral began from the same hospital on the same day, and he was then buried in Tehran's major cemetery Behesht Zahra.

Family members and friends and also public figures such as son of Iran's leader and Alireza Marandi attended the funeral procession.

Upon Chaichian's demise, several public figures and politicians in Iran sent condolence messages, including Supreme Leader Ali Khamenei ، Ali Larijani speaker of the Majlis (parliament), Abbas Salehi (Ministry of Culture) and Mohammad Ali Najafi (Tehran's Mayor).
