= Socialist Workers' Party of Iran =

Socialist Workers’ Party of Iran حزب کارگران سوسیالیست ایران
- Emblem of Socialist Worker’s Party of Iran
- Founded: 22 January 1979; 47 years ago
- Headquarters: Potters Bar, United Kingdom
- Ideology: Communism; Trotskyism
- Political position: Far-left
- International affiliation: United Secretariat of the Fourth International

Website
- Socialist Workers’ Party of Iran Archive

Socialist Workers’ Party of Iran (Persian: حزب کارگران سوسیالیست ایران, romanized: Ḥezb-e kārgarān-e sūsīālīst-e Irān) is a small Iranian Trotskyist communist party exiled in England. The party is a merger of two Trotskyist groups based abroad, "Trotskyists", the first Trotskyist group in the history of Persian communism that was founded by Iranian students in London in 1960s, and another group created in the United States with the help of Socialist Workers Party by Babak Zahraei. The two groups were unaware of each other, but were brought together via Fourth International.

The party members were few in number and activity and not very influential among leftists in Iran.
