= Esmail Khoi =

Iranian poet and writer (1938–2021)

- اسماعیل خویی
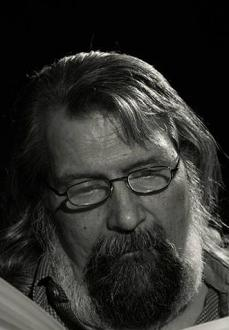
- Born: 30 June 1938; Mashhad, Iran
- Died: 25 June 2021 (aged 82); London, United Kingdom
- Resting place: Cremated, ashes buried at Golders Green Crematorium
- Citizenship: Iran; United Kingdom
- Education: Tehran Supreme University; London University
- Occupation: Writer, Poet
- Spouses: Franca Gallio (divorced) Roxana Saba (divorced)
- Children: 4

Esmail Khoi or Esmail Khoyi (Persian: اسماعیل خویی; 30 June 1938 – 25 May 2021) was an Iranian poet and writer. He was living in the United Kingdom after being exiled from Iran during the 1980s. Khoi was originally a lecturer in Philosophy before the Iranian Revolution. He was a member of the Iranian Writers' Association. His poems have been translated in many languages, including English, French, Russian, German and Ukrainian. He wrote a poetry book in English called "Voice of Exile", "What is shall be what is not". He is the first Iranian writer to be awarded the Coburg Rückert Prizen for literature, which he received in 2010.

== Selected bibliography ==
- Edges of Poetry:Selected Poetry (Blue Logos Press, 1995)
- Outlandia:Song of Exile (Nik Publishers, 1999)
