= Heshmat Raisi =

Iranian communist (born 1945)

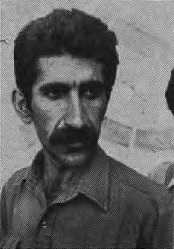
- Raisi at University of Tehran, 1979
- Born: Heshmatollah Raisi; 1945 (age 80–81); Iran
- Political party: OIPFG

Heshmat Raisi (Persian: حشمت رئیسی) was an Iranian communist who was a member of the Organization of Iranian People's Fedai Guerrillas.

== Career ==
Raisi was a guerilla fighting against Pahlavi dynasty, and he was arrested and imprisoned in the 1970s. After the Iranian Revolution, he was released from prison and became an alternate member in the central committee of the OIPFG. In 1979, he unsuccessfully ran for an Assembly of Experts for Constitution seat from Tehran constituency, garnering only 90,641 votes.
