= Deh-e Rais =

City in Sistan and Baluchestan province, Iran

Deh-e Rais Persian: ده رئيس
- City
- Location within Iran
- Coordinates: 27°40′26″N 61°01′49″E
- Country: Iran
- Province: Sistan and Baluchestan
- County: Khash
- District: Irandegan

Population (2016)
  - Total: 765
- Time zone: UTC+3:30 (IRST)

Deh-e Rais (Persian: ده رئيس) (Note: Also romanized as Deh-e Ra’īs; also known as Deh-e Ra’īs Gārūk, Deh-e Ra’īs-e Gārūk, Deh-e Ra’īsī, and Ra’īsī) is a city in, and the capital of, Irandegan District of Khash County, Sistan and Baluchestan province, Iran, and also serves as the administrative center for Kahnuk Rural District.

== Demographics ==
=== Population ===
At the time of the 2006 National Census, Deh-e Rais's population was 433 in 107 households, when it was a village in Kahnuk Rural District. The following census in 2011 counted 327 people in 79 households. The 2016 census measured the population of the village as 765 people in 219 households.

After the census, Deh-e Rais was elevated to the status of a city.
