= Hassan Tavanayanfard =

Iranian economist and author (1943–2015)

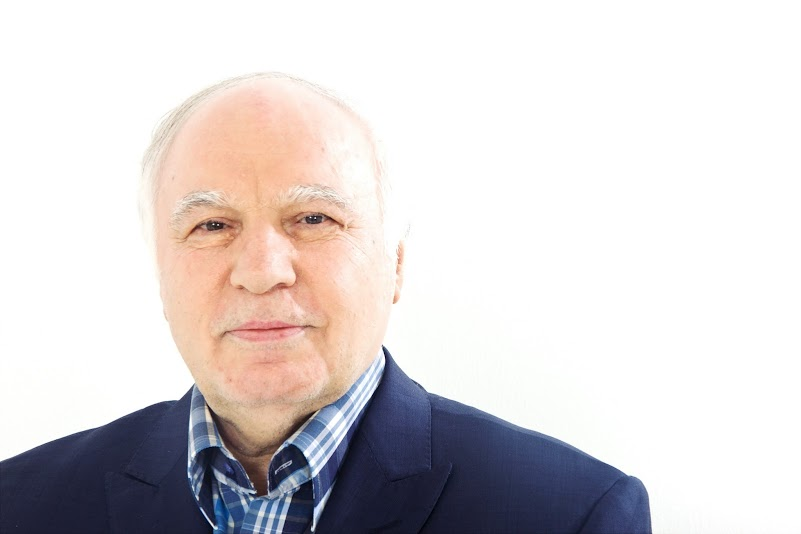
Hasan Tavanayan Fard

Hasan Tavanayan Fard (March 25, 1943 - January 21, 2015) was an Iranian economist, author and poet.

He wrote more than 40 books in his lifetime in the field of economics, history and literature and wrote many articles.

== Education ==
He completed his Economics degree at Tehran University. He studied Masters in Economics at Swansea University in 1972 and wrote a thesis titled 'U.K. private short term capital movements (1963-1972)' .

== Work ==
He held several teaching posts such as at the University of Sanate Sharif, Tehran University and Payame Noor University.

In 1986, he established his own publishing company called Far Nashr Publishing, printing books about Chemistry, English, Business Correspondence and Children’s IQ Test.

Birth	25 March 1943 (Tehran)
Death	21 January 2015 (Tehran)
Books and articles	More than 100
Diploma in Maths	Elmieh Tehran High School
Post Diploma in Religious Studies	Daneshsaraye Talimate Dini
Bachelor of Economics	Tehran University
Masters in Economics	Swansea University (Thesis: U.K. private short term capital movements 1963-1972)
PhD in Economics (not completed)	Swansea University (The Professor left Swansea University to return to Iran during the Iranian Revolution (intending to complete his PhD later). He wanted to provide academic assistance to Iranians during the Revolution. However, due to reasons explained below, he no longer had the opportunity to complete his PhD)

Some of his books include:

No	Book	Year
1	Social Economics	1969
2	The Economics of Education	1976
3	The Theory of Consumption	1976
4	The Economics of Development and Progress	1977
5	Economic Systems	1977
6	The Theory of Value of Labour	1977
7	Discourses in Iranian Economics	1977
8	Money – Economic Perspective	1977
9	A critique of the Economic Provisions of the Constitution	1980
10	Ziaratname of Taleghani's father	1980
11	Dr Shariati and Economics after the Revolution	1980
12	Economics from the perspective of 14 Ma’soom (i.e. Prophet Mohammad, his daughter Fatemeh and the 12 Shiah Imams)	1980
13	Economics from Prophet Mohammad's and Imam Ali's perspective	1980
14	The Unfulfilled Wishes	1980
15	Economic Schools of Thought	1981
16	The Imperialised Iranian Economics	1982
17	The Philosophy of Islamic Economics – Alame Tabatabayi	1984
18	The Imperialist's Economic Conspiracies in Iran	1985
19	The Fundamentals of Management in Islam	1986
20	Mosadegh and Economics	1986
21	The Economic Views of Imam Mohamad Ghazali	1987
22	The Economics of Development	1987
23	The Economic Views of Imam Fakhr Razi	1988
24	The Economics of Population	1989
25	Usury in Quran	1990
26	The Economics of Money	1991
27	Factors Influencing Religious Beliefs	1993
28	Utilising the Teachings of Islamic Prayer	1995
29	Utilising the Teachings of Haj	1998
30	The Advancement of Utilisation in Islamic Culture	1998
31	Economic Social Science from Dr Ali Shariati's perspective	1998
32	Frugality	1999
33	The Economics of Development – A New Model	2000
34	The Future of Economics: Economics before and After the Resurrection of the Shiah's 12th Imam	2001
35	The Flaws in Iranian Economics – Economic AIDS	2001
36	Harmonising Iranian Economics	2001
37	The Role of Women in Furthering Utilisation	2001
38	Microeconomics and Macroeconomics	2004
39	Economic Systems	2004
40	The Economics of Internet	2006
41	Cooperative Economics	2006
42	Quranic Economics	2006
43	Economic Dictionary : English – Farsi	2007
44	The Economics of Zakat (financial donation for religious purposes)	2008
45	The Encyclopedia of Islamic Economics	2011
