= Saboktakin Saloor =

Saboktakin Saloor (October 26, 1923 – November 8, 1991) was an Iranian journalist and historical novelist. He also wrote many popular serialized radio and television programs.

== Life and works ==
His novels, which include Ghorbangah, Bedoone Esgh Hargez, Ghobad and Gharatgaran were suspenseful stories usually marked by themes of sacrifice, honour, and family tragedy. In 1980, following the Islamic revolution, he was forced to flee Iran as the environment was no longer safe for a journalist and author known for his glorification of Persian monarchical history. He settled in Edmonton, Alberta, Canada, and died there in 1991.

Saloor had a passion for storytelling; his stories, usually set in Ancient Persia, expressed the importance of family and the patriarchal figure as a symbol of self-sacrifice. In terms of literary technique, he was heavily influenced by Persian literary masters such as Ferdowsi, but also by American cinema, particularly Westerns. A master of building suspense, his stories were a constant draw for radio audiences in the 1960s.

Saloor's books remain in print to this day, and many of his stories continue to be serialized in Iranian newspapers across North America.

He was the great-grandson of Abdol-samad Mirza Ezz ed-Dowleh Saloor.
