= Ali Golzadeh Ghafouri =

Iranian writer and faculty (1923–2010)

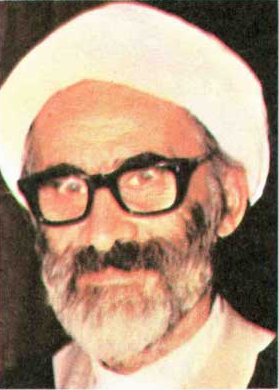

Member of Iranian Parliament
- In office 28 May 1980 – 28 May 1984 (Abstention since 10 June 1981)
- Constituency: Tehran, Rey and Shemiranat
- Majority: 1,336,435 (62.6%)

Member of Assembly of Experts for Constitution
- In office 15 August 1979 – 15 November 1979
- Constituency: Tehran Province
- Majority: 1,560,970 (61.5%)

Personal details
- Born: 14 May 1923 Qazvin, Sublime State of Persia
- Died: 1 January 2010 (aged 86) Tehran, Iran
- Education: Sorbonne

Ali Golzadeh Ghafouri (Persian: علی گلزاده غفوری; 14 May 1923 – 1 January 2010) was an Iranian Shia cleric and religious progressive politician.

== Political career ==
He ran as an independent candidate in the 1979 Iranian Constitutional Convention election. He criticized the conventional notions of private property by the establishment and enjoyed support by the People's Mujahedin of Iran, along with Mahmoud Taleghani. He was among the members of the post-revolutionary constituent assembly opposing to inclusion of Guardianship of the Islamic Jurist in the constitution.

In 1980, he was elected to the parliament, and was considered sympathetic to the Freedom Movement of Iran and the parliamentary opposition to the ruling Islamic Republican Party.

He left politics in 1981 and died in January 2010.

=== Electoral history ===
Year	Election	Votes	%	Rank	Notes
1979	Assembly of Experts	1,560,970	61.5	4th	Won
1980	Parliament	1,336,435	62.6	10th	Won

== Personal life ==
All three his children and his son-in-law were members of the People's Mujahedin of Iran (MEK) and were executed by the authorities.
