= Manouchehr Taslimi =

- منوچهر تسلیمی
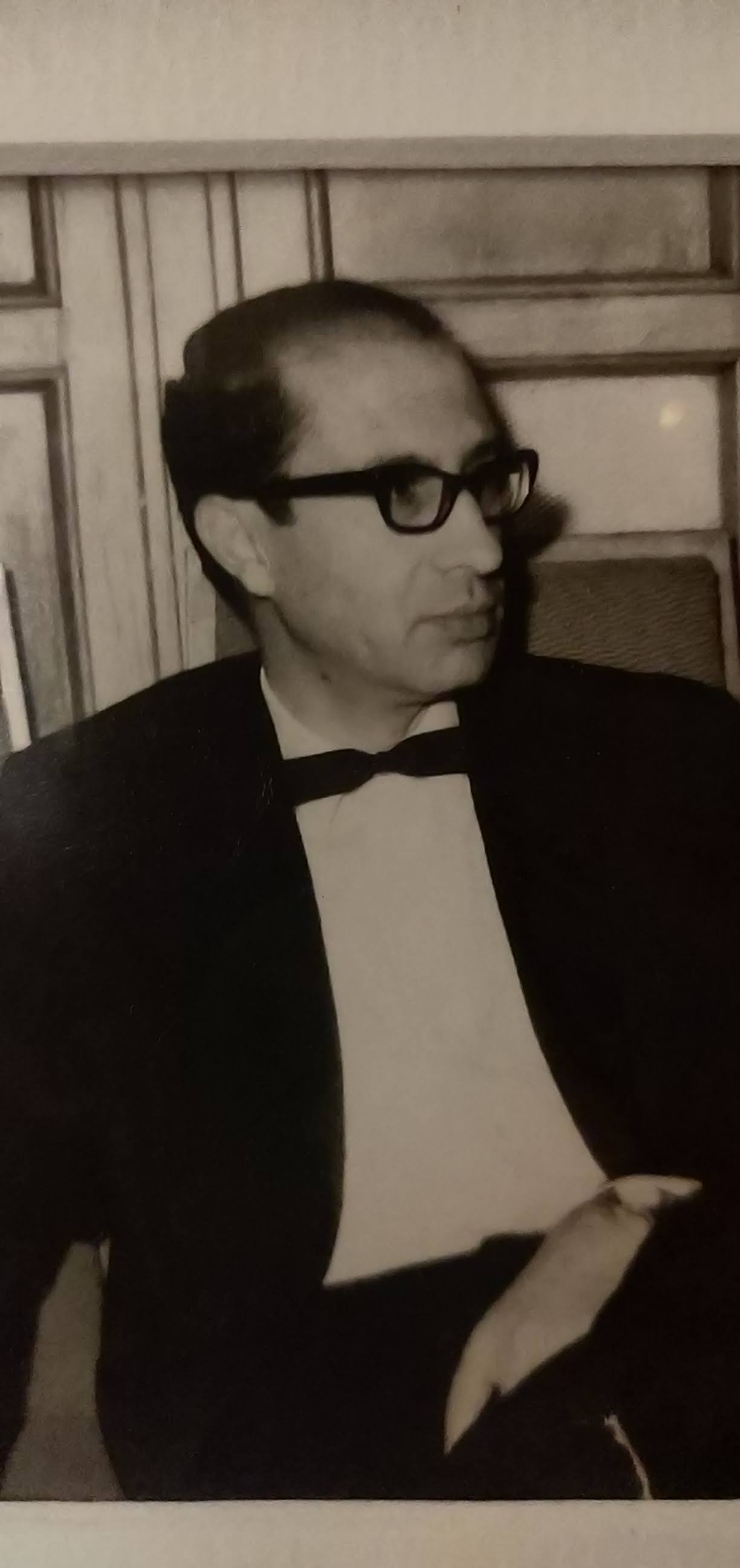
- Manouchehr Taslimi
- Born: 1923; Tehran (present-day Iran)
- Died: 1998 (aged 74–75); Kingston, Ontario, Canada
- Occupations: Professor, Member of Iranian Government (Minister of Commerce)

Manouchehr Taslimi (July 23, 1923, in Tehran, Iran – 1998 in Kingston, Ontario; Persian: منوچهر تسلیمی) was a professor, university chancellor, and member of government in Iran during the Pahlavi regime.

== Biography ==
Manouchehr Taslimi completed primary education in Qazvin. He received a master's degree in Mechanical engineering from Tehran University in 1946. Taslimi then attended Case Institute of technology in 1948. He then completed an M.Sc. in history and philosophy of science at the University of London (Conspectus of Recent Research on Arabic Chemistry-M.Sc thesis) followed by a doctoral degree in history and philosophy of science (An examination of the Nihdyat al-talab and the determination of its place and value in the history of Islamic chemistry; London (UC), 1954)

After completing his doctoral degree, Taslimi returned to Iran and began his career as assistant director for Education in Point IV program in Rasht (Gilan province, Iran). He then held several teaching and administrative jobs including administration of the Teachers Training College at Tehran University. He began his government career when he was appointed Undersecretary for Vocational Education, Ministry of Education, followed by advisor to the Ministry of Economic Affairs. Taslimi was then appointed to the position of Undersecretary in the ministry of Information before his appointment as chancellor of Tabriz University in 1968. He remained at Tabriz for four years. He was then appointed director of the Industrial Development and Renovation Organization in June 1972. After leading that organization for four years, Taslimi was appointed to the position of Minister of Commerce in the Amir-Abbas Hoveyda government. He remained in that position until the collapse of the Pahalvi regime.
