= Mohammad Jafar Jafari Langarudi =

Iranian lawyer and writer (1923–2023)

Muḥammad Jaʻfar Jaʻfarī Langarūdī
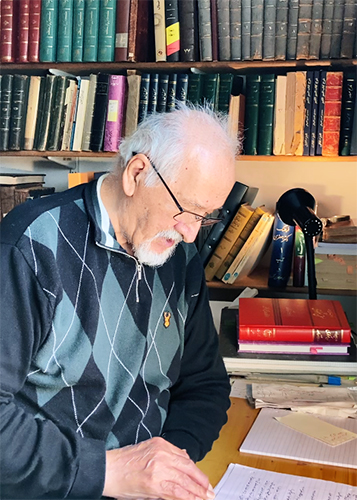
- Born: 14 April 1923; Langeroud, Iran
- Died: 27 February 2023 (aged 99); Eastbourne, United Kingdom
- Education: University of Tehran; Qom Seminary; Khorasan Seminary
- Occupations: Lawyer, Philosopher, Faqīh, Literature, writer
- Notable work: Legal, literary, philosophical and historical encyclopedias and books.
- Title: Allamah
- Spouse: Javadi
- Father: Musa Jafari Rashti Langeroudi
- Awards: Medal of the First Degree of Culture

Mohammad Jafar Jafari Langeroudi (Persian: محمّدجعفر جعفری لنگرودی; 14 April 1923 – 27 February 2023) was an Iranian Faqīh, mujtahid, philosopher, writer, poet, and jurist, and the author of writings on law and literature. In 2006, Jafari Langeroudi completed the general encyclopedia of law known as Al-Faregh. Al-Faregh is the first and largest legal encyclopedia in the Persian language, which examines all the six schools of Isma'ilism, Twelver Shi'a, Maliki, Hanafi, Hanbali and Shafi'i, as well as Roman law, i.e. the French legal system, in the jurisprudence of transactions and important legal issues.

Jafari Langeroudi was for a time the dean of the Faculty of Law at the University of Tehran and also the head of the Department of Private Law there. Jafari Langeroudi was one of the members of the six-member committee that drafted the constitution after the 1979 Iranian Revolution.
