= Behrouz Boroumand =

Iranian politician and physician

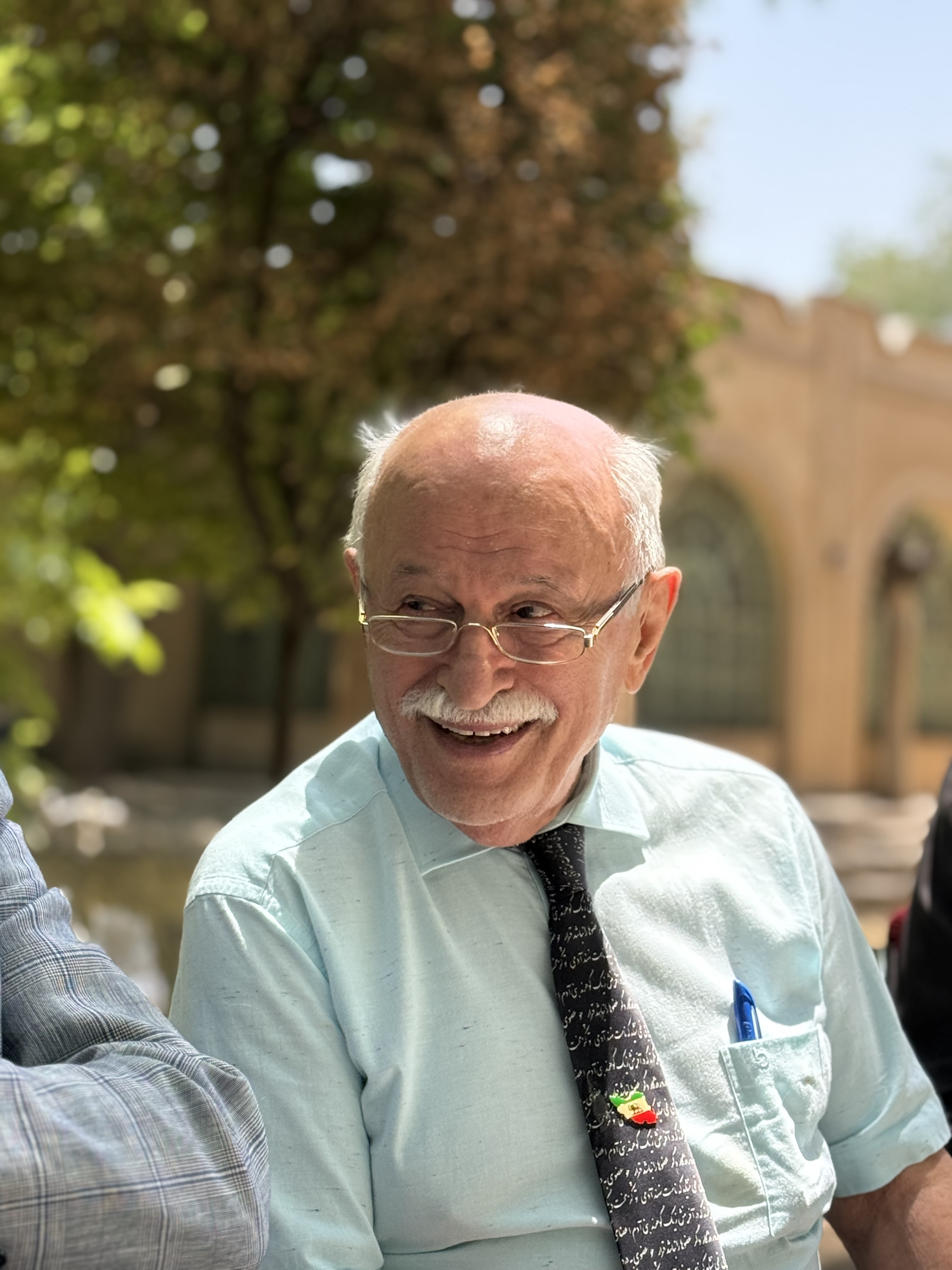
- Born: Qaemshahr, Iran
- Education: University of Tehran Medical School; Georgetown University School of Medicine; Armed Forces Institute of Pathology
- Political party: Nation Party of Iran
- Medical career
- Profession: Internal
- Field: Nephrology
- Institutions: Iranian Academy of Medical Sciences; Iran University of Medical Sciences
- Sub-specialties: Nephropathology
- Awards: ISN Pioneer Award (2014)

Behrouz Boroumand (Persian: بهروز برومند) is an Iranian physician and political activist.

== Early life and education ==
Boroumand was born in Qaemshahr, Mazandaran province, and obtained his medical degree from University of Tehran Medical School. He did his residency in Hackensack, New Jersey and District of Columbia General Hospital, and gained a fellowship in nephrology and nephropathology at Armed Forces Institute of Pathology.

== Medical career ==
During the 1970s, Boroumand worked at the 'National Dialysis and Transplant Committee' of health ministry and collaborated in the first kidney transplantation service in Iran. From 1976 to 1980, he was the president of 'Iranian Society of Nephrology' and office he holds for the second spell since 2000. He is acclaimed as "the founder and leader of kidney disease treatment in the Middle East" by the International Society of Nephrology (ISN), and received the society's Pioneer Award in 2014.

== Political activities ==
Boroumand has served in the leadership council of the Nation Party of Iran.

== Gallery ==
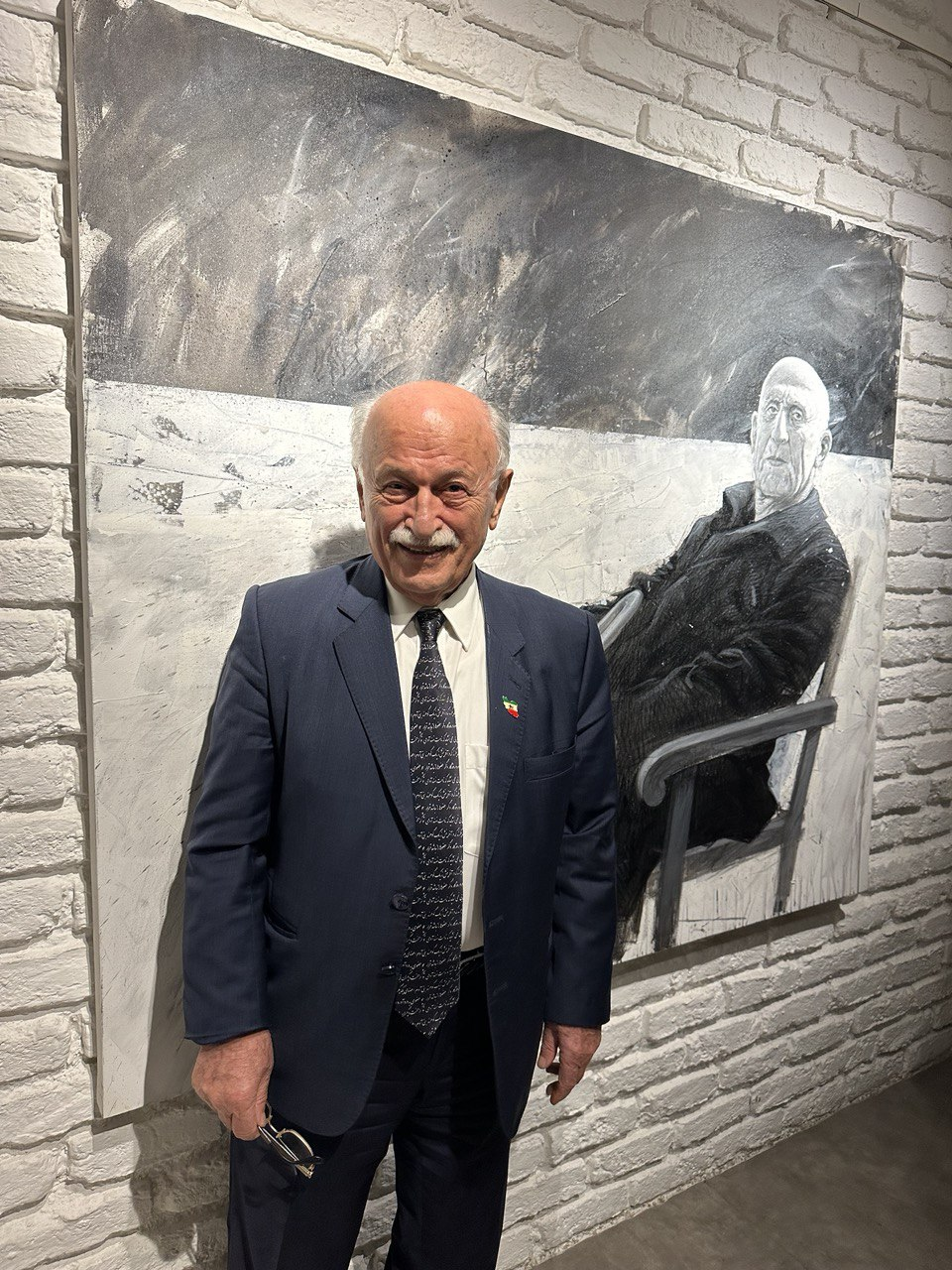
Behrouz Broumand at the art gallery

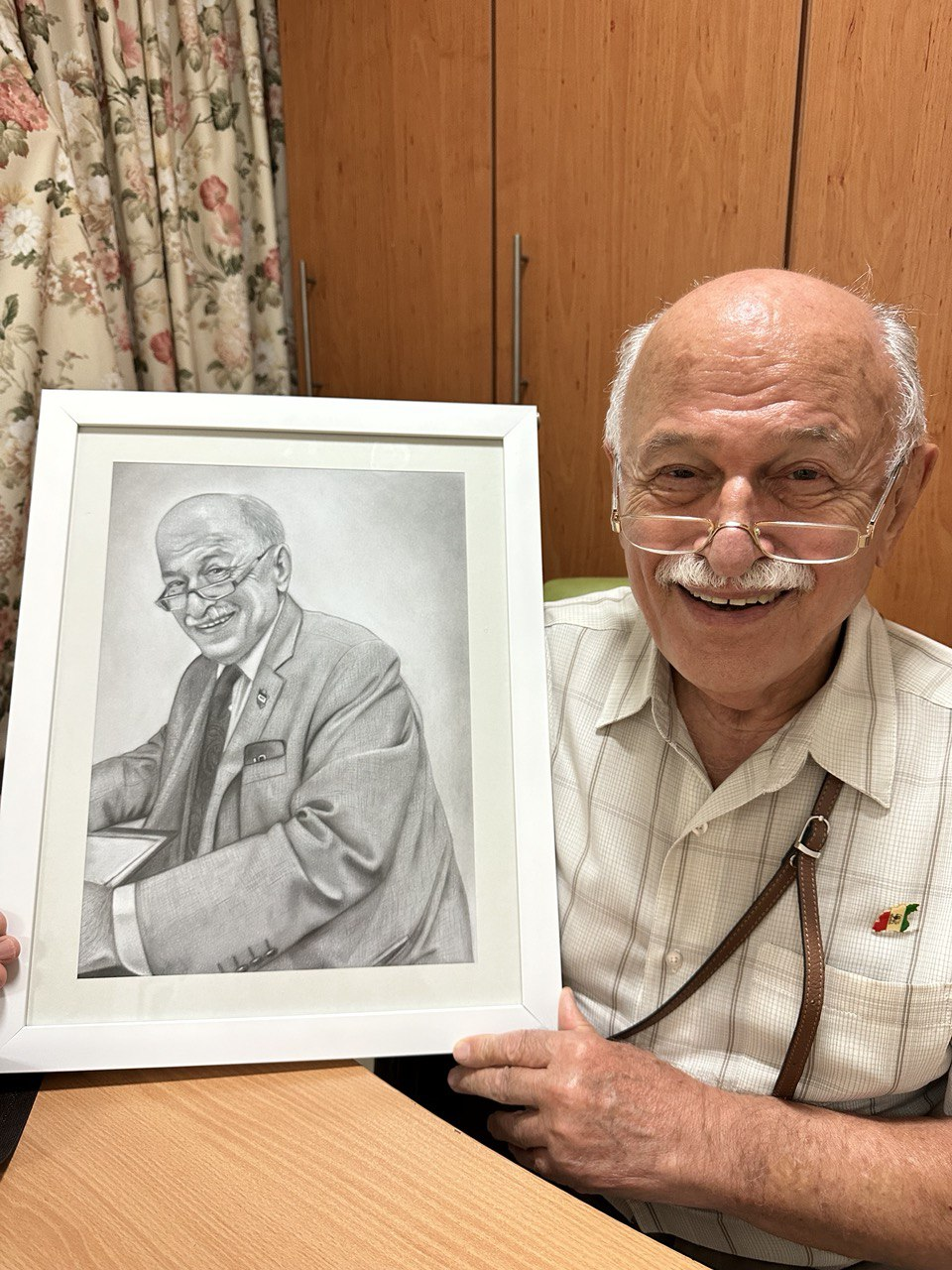

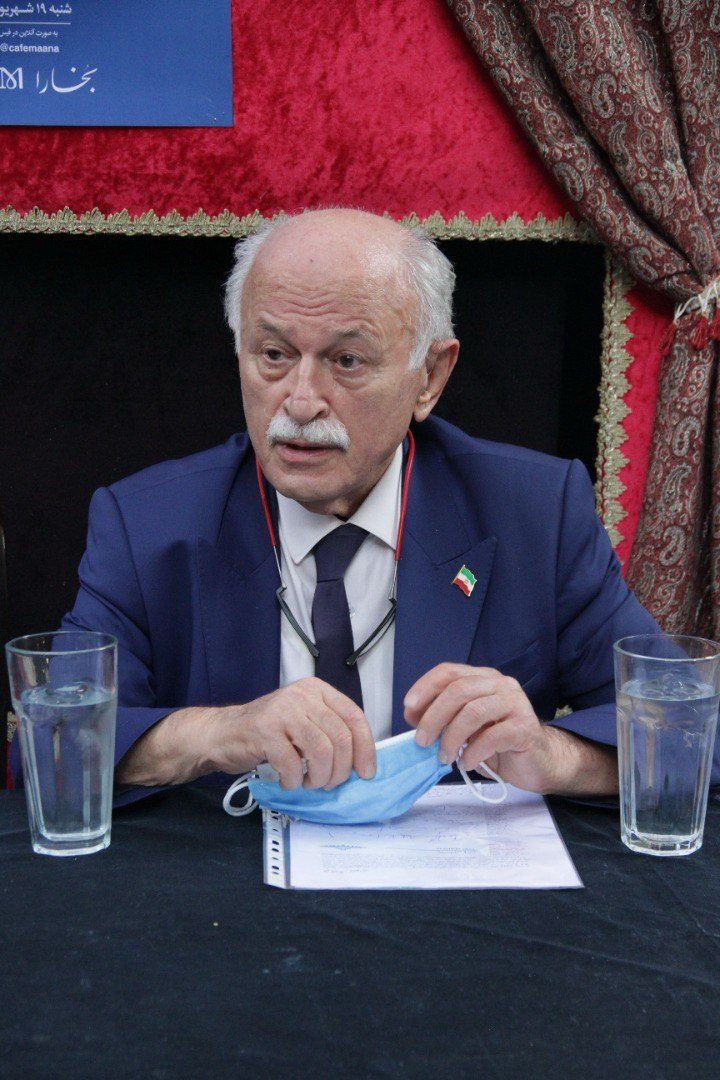
Behrooz Boroomand in Bukhara Magazine
