= Irandegan Rural District =

Rural district in Sistan and Baluchestan province, Iran

Irandegan Rural District Persian: دهستان ايرندگان
- Rural District
- Location within Iran
- Coordinates: 27°32′40″N 60°55′02″E
- Country: Iran
- Province: Sistan and Baluchestan
- County: Khash
- District: Irandegan
- Capital: Deh Qaleh

Population (2016)
  - Total: 4,056
- Time zone: UTC+3:30 (IRST)

Irandegan Rural District (Persian: دهستان ايرندگان) is in Irandegan District of Khash County, Sistan and Baluchestan province, Iran. Its capital is the village of Deh Qaleh.

== Demographics ==
=== Population ===
At the time of the 2006 National Census, the rural district's population was 4,232 in 974 households. In the 2011 census, the population declined to 2,973 inhabitants in 772 households. By 2016, the census measured 4,056 people in 1,562 households. Among its 36 villages, Dadkan was the most populous, with 417 people.
