= Kahnuk Rural District =

Rural district in Sistan and Baluchestan province, Iran

Kahnuk Rural District Persian: دهستان كهنوك
- Rural District
- Location within Iran
- Coordinates: 27°43′11″N 61°05′22″E
- Country: Iran
- Province: Sistan and Baluchestan
- County: Khash
- District: Irandegan
- Capital: Deh-e Rais

Population (2016)
  - Total: 9,267
- Time zone: UTC+3:30 (IRST)

Kahnuk Rural District (Persian: دهستان كهنوك) is in Irandegan District of Khash County, Sistan and Baluchestan province, Iran. It is administered from the city of Deh-e Rais.

== Demographics ==
=== Population ===
At the time of the 2006 National Census, the rural district's population was 8,200 in 1,898 households. There were 8,197 inhabitants in 1,978 households at the following census of 2011. The 2016 census measured the population of the rural district as 9,267 in 2,961 households. The most populous of its 139 villages was Espah, with 811 people.
