= Irandegan District =

District in Sistan and Baluchestan province, Iran

Irandegan District Persian: بخش ایرندگان
- District
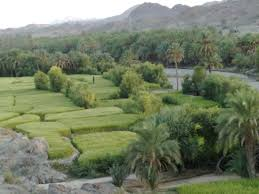
- Irandegan District

- Location within Iran
- Coordinates: 27°42′45″N 61°03′15″E
- Country: Iran
- Province: Sistan and Baluchestan
- County: Khash
- Capital: Deh-e Rais

Population (2016)
  - Total: 13,323
- Time zone: UTC+3:30 (IRST)

Irandegan District (Persian: بخش ایرندگان) is in Khash County, Sistan and Baluchestan province, Iran. Its capital is the city of Deh-e Rais.

== History ==
In 2018, the village of Deh-e Rais was elevated to the status of a city.

== Demographics ==
=== Population ===
At the time of the 2006 National Census, the district's population was 12,432 in 2,872 households. The following census in 2011 counted 11,170 people in 2,750 households. The 2016 census measured the population of the district as 13,323 inhabitants in 2,742 households.

=== Administrative divisions ===
Irandegan District Population
Administrative Divisions	2006	2011	2016
Irandegan RD	4,232	2,973	4,056
Kahnuk RD	8,200	8,197	9,267
Deh-e Rais (city) (Note: Became a city after the 2016 census)			
Total	12,432	11,170	13,323
RD = Rural District
