= Bidak =

Bidak (Persian: بيدك) may refer to:

- Bidak, Afghanistan
- Bidak, Arunachal Pradesh, India
- Bidak, Abadeh, Fars province, Iran
- Bidak, Fasa, Fars province, Iran
- Bidak-e Olya, Kohgiluyeh and Boyer-Ahmad province, Iran
- Bidak-e Salar, Kohgiluyeh and Boyer-Ahmad province, Iran
- Bidak-e Sohrab, Kohgiluyeh and Boyer-Ahmad province, Iran
- Bidak, Bojnord, North Khorasan province, Iran
- Bidak, Jajrom, North Khorasan province, Iran
- Bidak, Mashhad, Razavi Khorasan province, Iran
- Bidak, Sabzevar, Razavi Khorasan province, Iran
- Bidak, Taybad, Razavi Khorasan province, Iran
- Bidak, Torbat-e Jam, Razavi Khorasan province, Iran
- Bidak-e Bala, Khash County, Sistan and Baluchestan province, Iran
- Bidak-e Pain, Khash County, Sistan and Baluchestan province, Iran
- Bidak, Shusef, South Khorasan province, Iran
- Bidak-e Yekan, South Khorasan province, Iran
- Bidak, Tehran, Iran
- Bidak Rural District, in Fars province, Iran
