= Lalabad =

Lalabad (Persian: لعل اباد) may refer to various places in Iran:

- Lalabad, Lorestan
- Lalabad-e Hoseyn-e Qolikhani, Kermanshah Province
- Lalabad-e Kol Kol 1, Kermanshah Province
- Lalabad-e Kol Kol 2, Kermanshah Province
- Lalabad-e Olya, Kermanshah Province
- Lalabad-e Seyyed Jafari, Kermanshah Province
- Lalabad-e Seyyed Sadeq, Kermanshah Province
- Lalabad, Sistan and Baluchestan
- Lalabad-e Huti, Sistan and Baluchestan Province
- Lalabad, Yazd
