= Qaribabad =

Qaribabad and Gharibabad (Persian: قريب آباد or غريب آباد) may refer to various places in Iran:

- Qaribabad, Chaharmahal and Bakhtiari
- Gharibabad, Fars
- Gharibabad, Kerman
- Gharibabad, Chabahar, Sistan and Baluchestan Province
- Gharibabad, Eskelabad, Khash County, Sistan and Baluchestan Province
- Gharibabad-e Allah Dad, Khash County, Sistan and Baluchestan Province
- Gharibabad-e Nark, Khash County, Sistan and Baluchestan Province
- Gharibabad, West Azerbaijan
