= Mohammadabad-e Shah Nur =

Village in Sistan and Baluchestan province, Iran

Mohammadabad-e Shah Nur Persian: محمدابادشه نور
- Village
- Country: Iran
- Province: Sistan and Baluchestan
- County: Taftan
- District: Nazil
- Rural District: Chah-e Ahmad

Population (2016)
  - Total: 74
- Time zone: UTC+3:30 (IRST)

Mohammadabad-e Shah Nur (Persian: محمدابادشه نور) (Note: Also romanized as Moḩammadābād-e Shah Nūr) is a village in Chah-e Ahmad Rural District of Nazil District, Taftan County, Sistan and Baluchestan province, Iran.

== Demographics ==
=== Population ===
At the time of the 2006 National Census, the village's population was 54 people in 11 households, when it was in Nazil Rural District of the former Nukabad District of Khash County. The following census in 2011 counted 112 people in 24 households. The 2016 census measured the population of the village as 74 people in 26 households.

In 2018, the district was separated from the county in the establishment of Taftan County, and the rural district was transferred to the new Nazil District. Mohammadabad-e Shah Nur was transferred to Chah-e Ahmad Rural District created in the district.
