= Mohammadabad-e Pain Talarak =

Village in Sistan and Baluchestan province, Iran

Mohammadabad-e Pain Talarak Persian: محمد آباد پايين تلارك
- Village
- Country: Iran
- Province: Sistan and Baluchestan
- County: Taftan
- District: Nazil
- Rural District: Chah-e Ahmad

Population (2016)
  - Total: 100
- Time zone: UTC+3:30 (IRST)

Mohammadabad-e Pain Talarak (Persian: محمد آباد پايين تلارك) (Note: Also romanized as Moḩammadābād-e Pā’īn Talārak) is a village in Chah-e Ahmad Rural District of Nazil District, Taftan County, Sistan and Baluchestan province, Iran.

== Demographics ==
=== Population ===
At the time of the 2006 National Census, the village's population was 95 people in 18 households, when it was in Nazil Rural District of the former Nukabad District of Khash County. The village did not appear in the following census of 2011. The 2016 census measured the population of the village as 100 people in 24 households.

In 2018, the district was separated from the county in the establishment of Taftan County, and the rural district was transferred to the new Nazil District. Mohammadabad-e Pain Talarak was transferred to Chah-e Ahmad Rural District created in the district.
