= Aliabad, Nukabad =

Village in Sistan and Baluchestan province, Iran

Aliabad Persian: علي اباد
- Village
- Location within Iran
- Coordinates: 28°25′00″N 60°27′00″E
- Country: Iran
- Province: Sistan and Baluchestan
- County: Taftan
- District: Gowhar Kuh
- Rural District: Gowhar Kuh

Population (2016)
  - Total: 15
- Time zone: UTC+3:30 (IRST)

Aliabad (Persian: علي اباد) (Note: Also romanized as ‘Alīābād) is a village in Gowhar Kuh Rural District of Gowhar Kuh District, Taftan County, Sistan and Baluchestan province, Iran.

== Demographics ==
=== Population ===
At the time of the 2006 National Census, the village's population was 32 in 10 households, when it was in the former Nukabad District of Khash County. The following census in 2011 counted 16 people in five households. The 2016 census measured the population of the village as 15 people in four households.

In 2018, the district was separated from the county in the establishment of Taftan County, and the rural district was transferred to the new Gowhar Kuh District.
