= Mohammadabad, Taftan =

Village in Sistan and Baluchestan province, Iran

Mohammadabad Persian: محمداباد
- Village
- Location within Iran
- Coordinates: 28°33′43″N 60°40′52″E
- Country: Iran
- Province: Sistan and Baluchestan
- County: Taftan
- District: Central
- Rural District: Eskelabad

Population (2016)
  - Total: 207
- Time zone: UTC+3:30 (IRST)

Mohammadabad (Persian: محمداباد) (Note: Also romanized as Moḩammadābād) is a village in Eskelabad Rural District in the Central District of Taftan County, Sistan and Baluchestan province, Iran.

== Demographics ==
=== Population ===
At the time of the 2006 National Census, the village's population was 150 in 30 households, when it was in the former Nukabad District of Khash County. The following census in 2011 counted 182 people in 50 households. The 2016 census measured the population of the village as 207 people in 54 households.

In 2018, the district was separated from the county in the establishment of Taftan County, and the rural district was transferred to the new Central District.
