= Chah-e Ahmad =

Village in Sistan and Baluchestan province, Iran

Chah-e Ahmad Persian: چاه احمد
- Village
- Location within Iran
- Coordinates: 28°36′21″N 60°23′43″E
- Country: Iran
- Province: Sistan and Baluchestan
- County: Taftan
- District: Nazil
- Rural District: Chah-e Ahmad

Population (2016)
  - Total: 377
- Time zone: UTC+3:30 (IRST)

Chah-e Ahmad (Persian: چاه احمد is a village in, and the capital of, Chah-e Ahmad Rural District of Nazil District, Taftan County, Sistan and Baluchestan province, Iran.

== Demographics ==
=== Population ===
At the time of the 2006 National Census, the village's population was 238 people in 62 households, when it was in Nazil Rural District of the former Nukabad District of Khash County. The following census in 2011 counted 267 people in 62 households. The 2016 census measured the population of the village as 377 people in 103 households.

In 2018, the district was separated from the county in the establishment of Taftan County, and the rural district was transferred to the new Nazil District. Chah-e Ahmad was transferred to Chah-e Ahmad Rural District created in the district.
