= Kavari =

Village in Sistan and Baluchestan province, Iran

Kavari Persian: كاواري
- Village
- Location within Iran
- Coordinates: 28°18′15″N 60°24′35″E
- Country: Iran
- Province: Sistan and Baluchestan
- County: Taftan
- District: Gowhar Kuh
- Rural District: Shirabad

Population (2016)
  - Total: 740
- Time zone: UTC+3:30 (IRST)

Kavari (Persian: كاواري) (Note: Also romanized as Kāvārī) is a village in, and the capital of, Shirabad Rural District of Gowhar Kuh District, Taftan County, Sistan and Baluchestan province, Iran.

== Demographics ==
=== Population ===
At the time of the 2006 National Census, the village's population was 400 in 77 households, when it was in Gowhar Kuh Rural District of the former Nukabad District of Khash County. The following census in 2011 counted 387 people in 94 households. The 2016 census measured the population of the village as 740 people in 193 households.

In 2018, the district was separated from the county in the establishment of Taftan County. The rural district was transferred to the new Gowhar Kuh District, and Kavari was transferred to Shirabad Rural District created in the district.
