= Mohammadabad, Eskelabad =

Village in Sistan and Baluchestan province, Iran

Mohammadabad Persian: محمداباد
- Village
- Location within Iran
- Coordinates: 28°41′32″N 60°34′17″E
- Country: Iran
- Province: Sistan and Baluchestan
- County: Taftan
- District: Central
- Rural District: Eskelabad

Population (2016)
  - Total: 35
- Time zone: UTC+3:30 (IRST)

Mohammadabad (Persian: محمداباد) (Note: Also romanized as Moḩammadābād) is a village in Eskelabad Rural District in the Central District of Taftan County, Sistan and Baluchestan province, Iran.

== Demographics ==
=== Population ===
At the time of the 2006 National Census, the village's population was 69 in 13 households, when it was in the former Nukabad District of Khash County. The following census in 2011 counted 55 people in 12 households. The 2016 census measured the population of the village as 35 people in seven households.

In 2018, the district was separated from the county in the establishment of Taftan County, and the rural district was transferred to the new Central District.
