= Nalaki, Sistan and Baluchestan =

Nalaki نلكي
- Village
- Interactive map of Nalaki
- Coordinates: 27.0811°N 59.4016°E
- Country: Iran
- Province: Sistan and Baluchestan
- County: Khash
- Bakhsh: Nukabad
- Rural District: Nazil

Population (2006)
  - Total: 27
- Time zone: UTC+3:30 (IRST)
  - Summer (DST): UTC+4:30 (IRDT)

Nalaki (Persian: نلكي, also Romanized as Nalakī) is a village in Nazil Rural District, Nukabad District, Khash County, Sistan and Baluchestan province, Iran. At the 2006 census, its population was 27, in 9 families.
