= Tamandan =

Village in Sistan and Baluchestan province, Iran

Tamandan Persian: تمندان
- Village
- Location within Iran
- Coordinates: 28°34′23″N 61°00′51″E
- Country: Iran
- Province: Sistan and Baluchestan
- County: Taftan
- District: Central
- Rural District: Taftan-e Jonubi

Population (2016)
  - Total: 272
- Time zone: UTC+3:30 (IRST)

Tamandan (Persian: تمندان) (Note: Also romanized as Tamandān) is a village in, and the capital of, Taftan-e Jonubi Rural District of the Central District of Taftan County, Sistan and Baluchestan province, Iran. The previous capital of the rural district was the village of Dejang-e Bala.

== Demographics ==
=== Population ===
At the time of the 2006 National Census, the village's population was 532 in 136 households, when it was in the former Nukabad District of Khash County. The following census in 2011 counted 455 people in 111 households. The 2016 census measured the population of the village as 272 people in 84 households.

In 2018, the district was separated from the county in the establishment of Taftan County, and the rural district was transferred to the new Central District.
