= Estakhru =

Estakhru استخرو
- Village
- Location within Iran
- Coordinates: 28°39′54″N 60°32′31″E
- Country: Iran
- Province: Sistan and Baluchestan
- County: Khash
- Bakhsh: Nukabad
- Rural District: Nazil

Population (2006)
  - Total: 181
- Time zone: UTC+3:30 (IRST)
  - Summer (DST): UTC+4:30 (IRDT)

Estakhru (Persian: استخرو, also Romanized as Estakhrū; also known as Estārū) is a village in Nazil Rural District, Taftan County, Sistan and Baluchestan Province, Iran.

== History ==
In 2006, during Iran’s national census, Estakhru was officially recorded as a village with a population of 181 people across 51 families, under the jurisdiction of Nazil Rural District within Nukabad District of Khash County.

Following the 2016 census, Nukabad District was detached from Khash County to form part of the newly established Taftan County. Nazil Rural District was elevated as part of this realignment.
