= Narun =

Village in Sistan and Baluchestan province, Iran

Narun Persian: نرون
- Village
- Location within Iran
- Coordinates: 28°37′53″N 60°57′39″E
- Country: Iran
- Province: Sistan and Baluchestan
- County: Taftan
- District: Central
- Rural District: Taftan-e Jonubi

Population (2016)
  - Total: 826
- Time zone: UTC+3:30 (IRST)

Narun (Persian: نرون) is a village in Taftan-e Jonubi Rural District of the Central District of Taftan County, Sistan and Baluchestan province, Iran.

== Demographics ==
=== Population ===
At the time of the 2006 National Census, the village's population was 538 in 129 households, when it was in the former Nukabad District of Khash County. The following census in 2011 counted 387 people in 78 households. The 2016 census measured the population of the village as 826 people in 190 households. It was the most populous village in its rural district.

In 2018, the district was separated from the county in the establishment of Taftan County, and the rural district was transferred to the new Central District.
