= Shirabad, Gowhar Kuh =

Village in Sistan and Baluchestan province, Iran

Shirabad Persian: شورآباد
- Village
- Location within Iran
- Coordinates: 28°21′18″N 60°28′24″E
- Country: Iran
- Province: Sistan and Baluchestan
- County: Taftan
- District: Gowhar Kuh
- Rural District: Shirabad

Population (2016)
  - Total: 751
- Time zone: UTC+3:30 (IRST)

Shirabad (Persian: شورآباد) is a village in Shirabad Rural District of Gowhar Kuh District, Taftan County, Sistan and Baluchestan province, Iran, serving as capital of the district.

== Demographics ==
=== Population ===
At the time of the 2006 National Census, the village's population was 693 in 148 households, when it was in Gowhar Kuh Rural District of the former Nukabad District of Khash County. The following census in 2011 counted 525 people in 114 households. The 2016 census measured the population of the village as 751 people in 267 households. It was the most populous village in its rural district.

In 2018, the district was separated from the county in the establishment of Taftan County. The rural district was transferred to the new Gowhar Kuh District, and Shirabad was transferred to Shirabad Rural District created in the district.
