= Bahrabad, Sistan and Baluchestan =

Village in Sistan and Baluchestan province, Iran

Bahrabad Persian: بهراباد
- Village
- Location within Iran
- Coordinates: 28°44′31″N 60°38′53″E
- Country: Iran
- Province: Sistan and Baluchestan
- County: Taftan
- District: Nazil
- Rural District: Nazil

Population (2016)
  - Total: 353
- Time zone: UTC+3:30 (IRST)

Bahrabad (Persian: بهراباد) (Note: Also romanized as Bahrābād; also known as Bahrāmābād) is a village in, and the capital of, Nazil Rural District of Nazil District, Taftan County, Sistan and Baluchestan province, Iran. The previous capital of the rural district was the village of Nazil.

== Demographics ==
=== Population ===
At the time of the 2006 National Census, the village's population was 314 in 90 households, when it was in the former Nukabad District of Khash County. The following census in 2011 counted 129 people in 37 households. The 2016 census measured the population of the village as 353 people in 90 households.

In 2018, the district was separated from the county in the establishment of Taftan County, and Nazil Rural District was transferred to the new Nazil District.
