= Eskelabad =

Village in Sistan and Baluchestan province, Iran

Eskelabad Persian: اسكل اباد
- Village
- Location within Iran
- Coordinates: 28°34′45″N 60°48′27″E
- Country: Iran
- Province: Sistan and Baluchestan
- County: Taftan
- District: Central
- Rural District: Eskelabad

Population (2016)
  - Total: 927
- Time zone: UTC+3:30 (IRST)

Eskelabad (Persian: اسكل اباد) (Note: Also romanized as Eskalābād and Eskelābād) is a village in, and the capital of, Eskelabad Rural District of the Central District of Taftan County, Sistan and Baluchestan province, Iran. The previous capital of the rural district was the village of Deh-e Pabid.

== Demographics ==
=== Population ===
At the time of the 2006 National Census, the village's population was 604 in 149 households, when it was in the former Nukabad District of Khash County. The following census in 2011 counted 885 people in 218 households. The 2016 census measured the population of the village as 927 people in 290 households.

In 2018, the district was separated from the county in the establishment of Taftan County, and the rural district was transferred to the new Central District.
