= Deh-e Khalifeh, Kohgiluyeh and Boyer-Ahmad =

Deh-e Khalifeh (aka Arran Baker) ده خليفه
- Village
- Location within Iran
- Coordinates: 30°48′30″N 50°48′28″E
- Country: Iran
- Province: Kohgiluyeh and Boyer-Ahmad
- County: Charam
- Bakhsh: Sarfaryab
- Rural District: Sarfaryab

Population (2006)
  - Total: 167
- Time zone: UTC+3:30 (IRST)
  - Summer (DST): UTC+4:30 (IRDT)

Deh-e Khalifeh (Persian: ده خليفه, also Romanized as Deh-e Khalīfeh; also known as Khalīfeh) is a village in Sarfaryab Rural District, Sarfaryab District, Charam County, Kohgiluyeh and Boyer-Ahmad Province, Iran. At the 2006 census, its population was 167, in 36 families.
