= Kusheh-ye Gardak =

Kusheh-ye Gardak كوشه گرداك
- Village
- Country: Iran
- Province: Sistan and Baluchestan
- County: Khash
- Bakhsh: Nukabad
- Rural District: Taftan-e Jonubi

Population (2006)
  - Total: 232
- Time zone: UTC+3:30 (IRST)
  - Summer (DST): UTC+4:30 (IRDT)

Kusheh-ye Gardak (Persian: كوشه گرداك, also Romanized as Kūsheh-ye Gardāk) is a village in Taftan-e Jonubi Rural District, Nukabad District, Khash County, Sistan and Baluchestan Province, Iran. At the 2006 census, its population was 232, in 38 families.
