= Marishan =

Marishan ماريشان
- Village
- Location within Iran
- Coordinates: 28°34′16″N 60°55′11″E
- Country: Iran
- Province: Sistan and Baluchestan
- County: Khash
- Bakhsh: Nukabad
- Rural District: Taftan-e Jonubi

Population (2006)
  - Total: 85
- Time zone: UTC+3:30 (IRST)
  - Summer (DST): UTC+4:30 (IRDT)

Marishan (Persian: ماريشان, also Romanized as Mārīshān) is a village in Taftan-e Jonubi Rural District, Nukabad District, Khash County, Sistan and Baluchestan Province, Iran. At the 2006 census, its population was 85, in 26 families.
