= Vali Mohammadabad =

Vali Mohammadabad ولي محمد اباد
- Village
- Country: Iran
- Province: Sistan and Baluchestan
- County: Khash
- Bakhsh: Nukabad
- Rural District: Gowhar Kuh

Population (2006)
  - Total: 344
- Time zone: UTC+3:30 (IRST)
  - Summer (DST): UTC+4:30 (IRDT)

Vali Mohammadabad (Persian: ولي محمد اباد, also Romanized as Valī Moḩammadābād) is a village in Gowhar Kuh Rural District, Nukabad District, Khash County, Sistan and Baluchestan Province, Iran. At the 2006 census, its population was 344, in 67 families.
