= Deh Nadam =

Deh Nadam ده ندام
- Village
- Location within Iran
- Coordinates: 28°43′31″N 60°35′10″E
- Country: Iran
- Province: Sistan and Baluchestan
- County: Khash
- Bakhsh: Nukabad
- Rural District: Nazil

Population (2006)
  - Total: 169
- Time zone: UTC+3:30 (IRST)
  - Summer (DST): UTC+4:30 (IRDT)

Deh Nadam (Persian: ده ندام, also Romanized as Deh Nadām; also known as Kalāb-e Nāzīl) is a village in Nazil Rural District, Nukabad District, Khash County, Sistan and Baluchestan Province, Iran. At the 2006 census, its population was 169, in 43 families.
