= Siah Tir-e Pain =

Siah Tir-e Pain سياه تيرپائين
- Village
- Location within Iran
- Coordinates: 28°33′42″N 60°47′29″E
- Country: Iran
- Province: Sistan and Baluchestan
- County: Khash
- Bakhsh: Nukabad
- Rural District: Eskelabad

Population (2006)
  - Total: 77
- Time zone: UTC+3:30 (IRST)
  - Summer (DST): UTC+4:30 (IRDT)

Siah Tir-e Pain (Persian: سياه تيرپائين, also Romanized as Sīāh Tīr-e Pā’īn; also known as Sīāh Tīr and Sīāh Tīreh-ye Pā’īn) is a village in Eskelabad Rural District, Nukabad District, Khash County, Sistan and Baluchestan Province, Iran. At the 2006 census, its population was 77, in 20 families.
