= Sarfaryab =

Sarfaryab (Persian: سرفاریاب) may refer to:

- Sarfaryab, Iran, a city in Charam County, Kohgiluyeh and Boyer-Ahmad province, Iran
- Sarfaryab District
- Sarfaryab Rural District
