= Ab Qanat-e Eshkaft Dudar =

Ab Qanat-e Eshkaft Dudar اب قنات اشكفت دودر
- Village
- Country: Iran
- Province: Kohgiluyeh and Boyer-Ahmad
- County: Charam
- Bakhsh: Sarfaryab
- Rural District: Poshteh-ye Zilayi

Population (2006)
  - Total: 33
- Time zone: UTC+3:30 (IRST)
  - Summer (DST): UTC+4:30 (IRDT)

Ab Qanat-e Eshkaft Dudar (Persian: اب قنات اشكفت دودر, also Romanized as Āb Qanāt-e Eshkaft Dūdar) is a village in Poshteh-ye Zilayi Rural District, Sarfaryab District, Charam County, Kohgiluyeh and Boyer-Ahmad province, Iran. Its population in 2006 was 33, in 6 families.
