= Ab Namard =

Ab Namard اب نمرد
- Village
- Country: Iran
- Province: Sistan and Baluchestan
- County: Khash
- Bakhsh: Nukabad
- Rural District: Nazil

Population (2006)
  - Total: 39
- Time zone: UTC+3:30 (IRST)
  - Summer (DST): UTC+4:30 (IRDT)

Ab Namard (Persian: اب نمرد, also Romanized as Āb Namard) is a village in Nazil Rural District, Nukabad District, Khash County, Sistan and Baluchestan province, Iran. At the 2006 census, its population was 39, in 6 families.
