= Gowhar Shahr-e Chah-e Darkhati =

Village in Sistan and Baluchestan province, Iran

Gowhar Shahr-e Chah-e Darkhati Persian: گوهرشهر چاه درختی
- Village
- Location within Iran
- Coordinates: 28°24′11″N 60°32′34″E
- Country: Iran
- Province: Sistan and Baluchestan
- County: Taftan
- District: Gowhar Kuh
- Rural District: Gowhar Kuh

Population (2016)
  - Total: 31
- Time zone: UTC+3:30 (IRST)

Gowhar Shahr-e Chah-e Darkhati (Persian: گوهرشهر چاه درختی) is a village in, and the capital of, Gowhar Kuh Rural District of Gowhar Kuh District, Taftan County, Sistan and Baluchestan province, Iran.

== Demographics ==
=== Population ===
At the time of the 2016 National Census, the village's population was 31 people in 6 households, when it was in the former Nukabad District of Khash County.

In 2018, the district was separated from the county in the establishment of Taftan County, and the rural district was transferred to the new Gowhar Kuh District.
