= Mashin =

Mashin ماشين
- Village
- Location within Iran
- Coordinates: 28°25′04″N 60°52′52″E
- Country: Iran
- Province: Sistan and Baluchestan
- County: Khash
- Bakhsh: Nukabad
- Rural District: Taftan-e Jonubi

Population (2006)
  - Total: 23
- Time zone: UTC+3:30 (IRST)
  - Summer (DST): UTC+4:30 (IRDT)

Mashin (Persian: ماشين, also Romanized as Māshīn; also known as Deh-e Māshīn and Marshīn) is a village in Taftan-e Jonubi Rural District, Nukabad District, Khash County, Sistan and Baluchestan Province, Iran. At the 2006 census, its population was 23, in 5 families.
