= Dejang-e Bala =

Village in Sistan and Baluchestan province, Iran

Dejang-e Bala Persian: دجنگ بالا
- Village
- Location within Iran
- Coordinates: 28°27′15″N 60°55′37″E
- Country: Iran
- Province: Sistan and Baluchestan
- County: Taftan
- District: Central
- Rural District: Taftan-e Jonubi

Population (2016)
  - Total: 303
- Time zone: UTC+3:30 (IRST)

Dejang-e Bala (Persian: دجنگ بالا) (Note: Also romanized as Dejang-e Bālā) is a village in, and the former capital of, Taftan-e Jonubi Rural District of the Central District of Taftan County, Sistan and Baluchestan province, Iran. The capital of the rural district has been transferred to the village of Tamandan.

== Demographics ==
=== Population ===
At the time of the 2006 National Census, the village's population was 284 in 55 households, when it was in the former Nukabad District of Khash County. The following census in 2011 counted 435 people in 107 households. The 2016 census measured the population of the village as 303 people in 91 households.

In 2018, the district was separated from the county in the establishment of Taftan County, and the rural district was transferred to the new Central District.
