= Kuteh =

Kuteh كوته
- Village
- Location within Iran
- Coordinates: 28°33′08″N 60°56′06″E
- Country: Iran
- Province: Sistan and Baluchestan
- County: Khash
- Bakhsh: Nukabad
- Rural District: Taftan-e Jonubi

Population (2006)
  - Total: 921
- Time zone: UTC+3:30 (IRST)
  - Summer (DST): UTC+4:30 (IRDT)

Kuteh (Persian: كوته, also Romanized as Kūteh; also known as Kūteh-ye Pā’īn) is a village in Taftan-e Jonubi Rural District, Nukabad District, Khash County, Sistan and Baluchestan Province, Iran. At the 2006 census, its population was 921, in 173 families.
