= Chah Zilan =

Chah Zilan چاه زيلان
- Village
- Location within Iran
- Coordinates: 28°31′38″N 60°57′10″E
- Country: Iran
- Province: Sistan and Baluchestan
- County: Khash
- Bakhsh: Nukabad
- Rural District: Taftan-e Jonubi

Population (2006)
  - Total: 24
- Time zone: UTC+3:30 (IRST)
  - Summer (DST): UTC+4:30 (IRDT)

Chah Zilan (Persian: چاه زيلان, also Romanized as Chāh Zīlān; also known as Cheh Zīlān) is a village in Taftan-e Jonubi Rural District, Nukabad District, Khash County, Sistan and Baluchestan Province, Iran. At the 2006 census, its population was 24, in five families.
