= Tang-e Anar =

Tang-e Anar (Persian: تنگ انار) may refer to:

- Tang-e Anar-e Olya
- Tang-e Anar-e Sofla
- Tang-e Anar-e Vosta
