= Deh-e Pabid =

Village in Sistan and Baluchestan province, Iran

Deh-e Pabid Persian: ده پابيد
- Village
- Location within Iran
- Coordinates: 28°36′46″N 60°46′47″E
- Country: Iran
- Province: Sistan and Baluchestan
- County: Taftan
- District: Central
- Rural District: Eskelabad

Population (2016)
  - Total: 1,213
- Time zone: UTC+3:30 (IRST)

Deh-e Pabid (Persian: ده پابيد) (Note: Also romanized as Deh-e Pābīd, Deh-e Pabīd, and Dehpābīd; also known as Deh Pābad and Pabid) is a village in, and the former capital of, Eskelabad Rural District in the Central District of Taftan County, Sistan and Baluchestan province, Iran, serving as capital of the district. The capital of the rural district has been transferred to the village of Eskelabad.

== Demographics ==
=== Population ===
At the time of the 2006 National Census, the village's population was 1,310 in 258 households, when it was in the former Nukabad District of Khash County. The following census in 2011 counted 1,263 people in 294 households. The 2016 census measured the population of the village as 1,213 people in 341 households. It was the most populous village in its rural district.

In 2018, the district was separated from the county in the establishment of Taftan County, and the rural district was transferred to the new Central District.
