= Pur Janki =

Pur Janki پورجنكي
- Village
- Location within Iran
- Coordinates: 28°50′30″N 60°45′24″E
- Country: Iran
- Province: Sistan and Baluchestan
- County: Khash
- Bakhsh: Nukabad
- Rural District: Nazil

Population (2006)
  - Total: 123
- Time zone: UTC+3:30 (IRST)
  - Summer (DST): UTC+4:30 (IRDT)

Pur Janki (Persian: پورجنكي, also Romanized as Pūr Jankī; also known as Pūr Changī and Pūr Jangī) is a village in Nazil Rural District, Nukabad District, Khash County, Sistan and Baluchestan Province, Iran. At the 2006 census, its population was 123, in 35 families.
