= Biahu Dushing-e Pain =

Biahu Dushing-e Pain بياهودوشينگ پايين
- Village
- Country: Iran
- Province: Sistan and Baluchestan
- County: Khash
- Bakhsh: Nukabad
- Rural District: Taftan-e Jonubi

Population (2006)
  - Total: 66
- Time zone: UTC+3:30 (IRST)
  - Summer (DST): UTC+4:30 (IRDT)

Biahu Dushing-e Pain (Persian: بياهودوشينگ پايين, also Romanized as Bīāhū Dūshīng-e Pā’īn) is a village in Taftan-e Jonubi Rural District, Nukabad District, Khash County, Sistan and Baluchestan Province, Iran. At the 2006 census, its population was 66, in 10 families.
