= Cheshmeh-ye Abek =

Cheshmeh-ye Abek چشمه ابك
- Village
- Location within Iran
- Coordinates: 28°40′20″N 60°57′20″E
- Country: Iran
- Province: Sistan and Baluchestan
- County: Khash
- Bakhsh: Nukabad
- Rural District: Taftan-e Jonubi

Population (2006)
  - Total: 22
- Time zone: UTC+3:30 (IRST)
  - Summer (DST): UTC+4:30 (IRDT)

Cheshmeh-ye Abek (Persian: چشمه ابك, also Romanized as Cheshmeh-ye Ābek; also known as Cheshm Ābek) is a village in Taftan-e Jonubi Rural District, Nukabad District, Khash County, Sistan and Baluchestan Province, Iran. At the 2006 census, its population was 22, in 7 families.
