= Gowhar Kuh Shahrak =

Village in Sistan and Baluchestan province, Iran

Gowhar Kuh Shahrak Persian: گوهركوه شهرك
- Village
- Location within Iran
- Coordinates: 28°23′17″N 60°31′08″E
- Country: Iran
- Province: Sistan and Baluchestan
- County: Taftan
- District: Gowhar Kuh
- Rural District: Gowhar Kuh

Population (2016)
  - Total: 135
- Time zone: UTC+3:30 (IRST)

Gowhar Kuh Shahrak (Persian: گوهركوه شهرك) (Note: Also romanized as Gowhar Kūh Shahrak; also known as Gohar Kūh, Gowhar Kūh, and Gwār Kūh) is a village in Gowhar Kuh Rural District of Gowhar Kuh District, Taftan County, Sistan and Baluchestan province, Iran.

== Demographics ==
=== Population ===
At the time of the 2006 National Census, the village's population was 985 in 192 households, when it was in the former Nukabad District of Khash County. The following census in 2011 counted 203 people in 47 households. The 2016 census measured the population of the village as 135 people in 32 households.

In 2018, the district was separated from the county in the establishment of Taftan County, and the rural district was transferred to the new Gowhar Kuh District.
