= Shahidayit-e Shandak =

Shahidayit-e Shandak شهيدايت شندك
- Village
- Interactive map of Shahidayit-e Shandak
- Country: Iran
- Province: Sistan and Baluchestan
- County: Khash
- Bakhsh: Nukabad
- Rural District: Gowhar Kuh

Population (2006)
  - Total: 405
- Time zone: UTC+3:30 (IRST)
  - Summer (DST): UTC+4:30 (IRDT)

Shahidayit-e Shandak (Persian: شهيدايت شندك, also Romanized as Shahīdāyīt-e Shandak) is a village in Gowhar Kuh Rural District, Nukabad District, Khash County, Sistan and Baluchestan Province, Iran. At the 2006 census, its population was 405, in 67 families.
