= Biduk-e Bala =

Biduk-e Bala بيدوك بالا
- Village
- Country: Iran
- Province: Sistan and Baluchestan
- County: Khash
- Bakhsh: Nukabad
- Rural District: Nazil

Population (2006)
  - Total: 10
- Time zone: UTC+3:30 (IRST)
  - Summer (DST): UTC+4:30 (IRDT)

Biduk-e Bala (Persian: بيدوك بالا, also Romanized as Bīdūk-e Bālā) is a village in Nazil Rural District, Nukabad District, Khash County, Sistan and Baluchestan Province, Iran. At the 2006 census, its population was 10, in 4 families.
