= Kalleh Shahtut =

Village in Sistan and Baluchestan province, Iran

Kalleh Shahtut Persian: كله شهتوت
- Village
- Location within Iran
- Coordinates: 28°45′59″N 60°47′08″E
- Country: Iran
- Province: Sistan and Baluchestan
- County: Taftan
- District: Nazil
- Rural District: Nazil

Population (2016)
  - Total: 521
- Time zone: UTC+3:30 (IRST)

Kalleh Shahtut (Persian: كله شهتوت) (Note: Also romanized as Kalleh Shahtūt; also known as Qal‘eh-ye Shāhtūt) is a village in Nazil Rural District of Nazil District, Taftan County, Sistan and Baluchestan province, Iran.

== Demographics ==
=== Population ===
At the time of the 2006 National Census, the village's population was 330 in 64 households, when it was in the former Nukabad District of Khash County. The following census in 2011 counted 192 people in 42 households. The 2016 census measured the population of the village as 521 people in 129 households. It was the most populous village in its rural district.

In 2018, the district was separated from the county in the establishment of Taftan County, and the rural district was transferred to the new Nazil District.
