= Gurmurik =

Gurmurik گورموريك
- Village
- Location within Iran
- Coordinates: 28°35′43″N 61°02′39″E
- Country: Iran
- Province: Sistan and Baluchestan
- County: Khash
- Bakhsh: Nukabad
- Rural District: Taftan-e Jonubi

Population (2006)
  - Total: 19
- Time zone: UTC+3:30 (IRST)
  - Summer (DST): UTC+4:30 (IRDT)

Gurmurik (Persian: گورموريك, also Romanized as Gūrmūrīk; also known as Gūrmūrī) is a village in Taftan-e Jonubi Rural District, Nukabad District, Khash County, Sistan and Baluchestan Province, Iran. At the 2006 census, its population was 19, in 4 families.
