= Do Rudi Narun =

Do Rudi Narun دورودي نرون
- Village
- Country: Iran
- Province: Sistan and Baluchestan
- County: Khash
- Bakhsh: Nukabad
- Rural District: Taftan-e Jonubi

Population (2006)
  - Total: 332
- Time zone: UTC+3:30 (IRST)

Do Rudi Narun (Persian: دورودي نرون, also Romanized as Do Rūdī Narūn) is a village in Taftan-e Jonubi Rural District, Nukabad District, Khash County, Sistan and Baluchestan Province, Iran. At the 2006 census, its population was 332, in 59 families.
