= Tah Rud =

Tah Rud ته رود
- Village
- Location within Iran
- Coordinates: 28°51′41″N 60°44′47″E
- Country: Iran
- Province: Sistan and Baluchestan
- County: Khash
- Bakhsh: Nukabad
- Rural District: Nazil

Population (2006)
  - Total: 50
- Time zone: UTC+3:30 (IRST)
  - Summer (DST): UTC+4:30 (IRDT)

Tah Rud (Persian: ته رود, also Romanized as Tah Rūd) is a village in Nazil Rural District, Nukabad District, Khash County, Sistan and Baluchestan Province, Iran. At the 2006 census, its population was 50, in 10 families.
