= Biduk-e Murtak =

Biduk-e Murtak بيدوك مورتك
- Village
- Location within Iran
- Coordinates: 28°46′50″N 60°48′02″E
- Country: Iran
- Province: Sistan and Baluchestan
- County: Khash
- Bakhsh: Nukabad
- Rural District: Eskelabad

Population (2006)
  - Total: 19
- Time zone: UTC+3:30 (IRST)
  - Summer (DST): UTC+4:30 (IRDT)

Biduk-e Murtak (Persian: بيدوك مورتك, also Romanized as Bīdūk-e Mūrtak; also known as Bīdūk) is a village in Eskelabad Rural District, Nukabad District, Khash County, Sistan and Baluchestan Province, Iran. At the 2006 census, its population was 19, in 5 families.
