= Kalleh-ye Espid =

Kalleh-ye Espid كله اسپيد
- Village
- Location within Iran
- Coordinates: 28°22′00″N 60°24′00″E
- Country: Iran
- Province: Sistan and Baluchestan
- County: Khash
- Bakhsh: Nukabad
- Rural District: Gowhar Kuh

Population (2006)
  - Total: 81
- Time zone: UTC+3:30 (IRST)
  - Summer (DST): UTC+4:30 (IRDT)

Kalleh-ye Espid (Persian: كله اسپيد, also Romanized as Kalleh-ye Espīd; also known as Kal-e Espīd) is a village in Gowhar Kuh Rural District, Nukabad District, Khash County, Sistan and Baluchestan Province, Iran. At the 2006 census, its population was 81, in 31 families.
