= Posht Chenar =

Posht Chenar پشت چنار
- Village
- Location within Iran
- Coordinates: 30°51′01″N 50°50′24″E
- Country: Iran
- Province: Kohgiluyeh and Boyer-Ahmad
- County: Charam
- Bakhsh: Sarfaryab
- Rural District: Sarfaryab

Population (2006)
  - Total: 132
- Time zone: UTC+3:30 (IRST)
  - Summer (DST): UTC+4:30 (IRDT)

Posht Chenar (Persian: پشت چنار, also Romanized as Posht Chenār; also known as Posht Chendār and Posht-e Chendār) is a village in Sarfaryab Rural District, Sarfaryab District, Charam County, Kohgiluyeh and Boyer-Ahmad Province, Iran. At the 2006 census, its population was 132, in 23 families.
