= Biduk-e Pain =

Biduk-e Pain بيدوك پائين
- Village
- Country: Iran
- Province: Sistan and Baluchestan
- County: Khash
- Bakhsh: Nukabad
- Rural District: Nazil

Population (2006)
  - Total: 90
- Time zone: UTC+3:30 (IRST)
  - Summer (DST): UTC+4:30 (IRDT)

Biduk-e Pain (Persian: بيدوك پائين, also Romanized as Bīdūk-e Pā’īn) is a village in Nazil Rural District, Nukabad District, Khash County, Sistan and Baluchestan Province, Iran. At the 2006 census, its population was 90, in 21 families.
