= Arzantak =

Arzantak ارزانتاك
- Village
- Location within Iran
- Coordinates: 28°24′00″N 60°18′00″E
- Country: Iran
- Province: Sistan and Baluchestan
- County: Khash
- Bakhsh: Nukabad
- Rural District: Gowhar Kuh

Population (2006)
  - Total: 109
- Time zone: UTC+3:30 (IRST)
  - Summer (DST): UTC+4:30 (IRDT)

Arzantak (Persian: ارزانتاك, also Romanized as Arzantāk) is a village in Gowhar Kuh Rural District, Nukabad District, Khash County, Sistan and Baluchestan Province, Iran. At the 2006 census, its population was 109, in 31 families.
