= Ziruki-ye Gowhar Kuh =

Ziruki-ye Gowhar Kuh زيروكي گوهركوه
- Village
- Location within Iran
- Coordinates: 28°24′23″N 60°26′29″E
- Country: Iran
- Province: Sistan and Baluchestan
- County: Khash
- Bakhsh: Nukabad
- Rural District: Gowhar Kuh

Population (2006)
  - Total: 23
- Time zone: UTC+3:30 (IRST)
  - Summer (DST): UTC+4:30 (IRDT)

Ziruki-ye Gowhar Kuh (Persian: زيروكي گوهركوه, also Romanized as Zīrūkī-ye Gowhar Kūh; also known as Zīrakī, Zīrūkī, and Zīrūkī Gohar Kūh) is a village in Gowhar Kuh Rural District, Nukabad District, Khash County, Sistan and Baluchestan Province, Iran. At the 2006 census, its population was 23, in 5 families.
