= Paleki-ye Abdi =

Paleki-ye Abdi پالكي عبدي
- Village
- Location within Iran
- Coordinates: 30°55′01″N 50°44′03″E
- Country: Iran
- Province: Kohgiluyeh and Boyer-Ahmad
- County: Charam
- Bakhsh: Sarfaryab
- Rural District: Poshteh-ye Zilayi

Population (2006)
  - Total: 83
- Time zone: UTC+3:30 (IRST)
  - Summer (DST): UTC+4:30 (IRDT)

Paleki-ye Abdi (Persian: پالكي عبدي, also Romanized as Pālekī-ye ‘Abdī; also known as Pālekī-ye Bālā and Pālekī-ye ‘Olyā) is a village in Poshteh-ye Zilayi Rural District, Sarfaryab District, Charam County, Kohgiluyeh and Boyer-Ahmad Province, Iran. At the 2006 census, its population was 83, in 16 families.
