= Sharab Goruh =

Sharab Goruh شرابگروه
- Village
- Location within Iran
- Coordinates: 30°46′45″N 50°53′34″E
- Country: Iran
- Province: Kohgiluyeh and Boyer-Ahmad
- County: Charam
- Bakhsh: Sarfaryab
- Rural District: Sarfaryab

Population (2006)
  - Total: 104
- Time zone: UTC+3:30 (IRST)
  - Summer (DST): UTC+4:30 (IRDT)

Sharab Goruh (Persian: شرابگروه, also Romanized as Sharāb Gorūh) is a village in Sarfaryab Rural District, Sarfaryab District, Charam County, Kohgiluyeh and Boyer-Ahmad Province, Iran. At the 2006 census, its population was 104, in 18 families.
