= Nazil =

Village in Sistan and Baluchestan province, Iran

Nazil Persian: نازيل
- Village
- Location within Iran
- Coordinates: 28°44′13″N 60°37′26″E
- Country: Iran
- Province: Sistan and Baluchestan
- County: Taftan
- District: Nazil
- Rural District: Nazil

Population (2016)
  - Total: 419
- Time zone: UTC+3:30 (IRST)

Nazil (Persian: نازيل) (Note: Also Romanized as Nāzīl; also known as Nārīl) is a village in, and the former capital of, Nazil Rural District of Nazil District, Taftan County, Sistan and Baluchestan province, Iran, serving as capital of the district. The capital of the rural district has been transferred to the village of Bahrabad.

== Demographics ==
=== Population ===
At the time of the 2006 National Census, the village's population was 591 in 205 households, when it was in the former Nukabad District of Khash County. The following census in 2011 counted 184 people in 61 households. The 2016 census measured the population of the village as 419 people in 140 households.

In 2018, the district was separated from the county in the establishment of Taftan County, and the rural district was transferred to the new Nazil District.
