= Shahid Shah Nazar =

Shahid Shah Nazar شهيدشاه نظر
- Village
- Country: Iran
- Province: Sistan and Baluchestan
- County: Khash
- Bakhsh: Nukabad
- Rural District: Gowhar Kuh

Population (2006)
  - Total: 88
- Time zone: UTC+3:30 (IRST)
  - Summer (DST): UTC+4:30 (IRDT)

Shahid Shah Nazar (Persian: شهيدشاه نظر, also Romanized as Shahīd Shāh Naz̧ar) is a village in Gowhar Kuh Rural District, Nukabad District, Khash County, Sistan and Baluchestan province, Iran. At the 2006 census, its population was 88, in 20 families.
