= Kusheh-ye Qaleh Rashid Khan =

Kusheh-ye Qaleh Rashid Khan كوشه قلعه رشيدخان
- Village
- Country: Iran
- Province: Sistan and Baluchestan
- County: Khash
- Bakhsh: Nukabad
- Rural District: Taftan-e Jonubi

Population (2006)
  - Total: 219
- Time zone: UTC+3:30 (IRST)
  - Summer (DST): UTC+4:30 (IRDT)

Kusheh-ye Qaleh Rashid Khan (Persian: كوشه قلعه رشيدخان, also Romanized as Kūsheh-ye Qal‘eh Rashīd Khān) is a village in Taftan-e Jonubi Rural District, Nukabad District, Khash County, Sistan and Baluchestan Province, Iran. At the 2006 census, its population was 219, in 51 families.
