= Sazink-e Olya =

Sazink-e Olya سازينك عليا
- Village
- Location within Iran
- Coordinates: 28°32′49″N 60°41′23″E
- Country: Iran
- Province: Sistan and Baluchestan
- County: Khash
- Bakhsh: Nukabad
- Rural District: Eskelabad

Population (2006)
  - Total: 247
- Time zone: UTC+3:30 (IRST)
  - Summer (DST): UTC+4:30 (IRDT)

Sazink-e Olya (Persian: سازينك عليا, also Romanized as Sāzīnk-e ‘Olyā; also known as Sāzīnak, Sāzīnk, and Sāznīk) is a village in Eskelabad Rural District, Nukabad District, Khash County, Sistan and Baluchestan Province, Iran. At the 2006 census, its population was 247, in 49 families.
