= Aliyeh Dorudy =

Aliyeh Dorudy عاليه درودئ
- Village
- Country: Iran
- Province: Sistan and Baluchestan
- County: Khash
- Bakhsh: Nukabad
- Rural District: Taftan-e Jonubi

Population (2006)
  - Total: 71
- Time zone: UTC+3:30 (IRST)
  - Summer (DST): UTC+4:30 (IRDT)

Aliyeh Dorudy (Persian: عاليه درودئ, also Romanized as ʿĀlīyeh Dorūdy) is a village in Taftan-e Jonubi Rural District, Nukabad District, Khash County, Sistan and Baluchestan Province, Iran. At the 2006 census, its population was 71, in 10 families.
