= Sangan-e Kuknak =

Sangan-e Kuknak سنگان كوكناك
- Village
- Location within Iran
- Coordinates: 28°39′02″N 60°56′41″E
- Country: Iran
- Province: Sistan and Baluchestan
- County: Khash
- Bakhsh: Nukabad
- Rural District: Taftan-e Jonubi

Population (2006)
  - Total: 206
- Time zone: UTC+3:30 (IRST)
  - Summer (DST): UTC+4:30 (IRDT)

Sangan-e Kuknak (Persian: سنگان كوكناك, also Romanized as Sangān-e Kūknāk or Sangān-e Kūgnāk) is a village in Taftan-e Jonubi Rural District, Nukabad District, Khash County, Sistan and Baluchestan Province, Iran. At the 2006 census, its population was 206, in 48 families.
