= Sihaki Kuteh =

Sihaki Kuteh سيهكي كوته
- Village
- Country: Iran
- Province: Sistan and Baluchestan
- County: Khash
- Bakhsh: Nukabad
- Rural District: Taftan-e Jonubi

Population (2006)
  - Total: 267
- Time zone: UTC+3:30 (IRST)
  - Summer (DST): UTC+4:30 (IRDT)

Sihaki Kuteh (Persian: سيهكي كوته, also Romanized as Sīhakī Kūteh) is a village in Taftan-e Jonubi Rural District, Nukabad District, Khash County, Sistan and Baluchestan Province, Iran. As of the 2006 census, its population was 267, in 51 families.
