= Kemyan =

Kemyan كميان
- Village
- Location within Iran
- Coordinates: 30°49′49″N 50°48′36″E
- Country: Iran
- Province: Kohgiluyeh and Boyer-Ahmad
- County: Charam
- Bakhsh: Sarfaryab
- Rural District: Sarfaryab

Population (2006)
  - Total: 43
- Time zone: UTC+3:30 (IRST)
  - Summer (DST): UTC+4:30 (IRDT)

Kemyan (Persian: كميان, also Romanized as Kemyān) is a village in Sarfaryab Rural District, Sarfaryab District, Charam County, Kohgiluyeh and Boyer-Ahmad Province, Iran. At the 2006 census, its population was 43, in 11 families.
