= Darreh-ye Akhund =

Darreh-ye Akhund دره اخوند
- Village
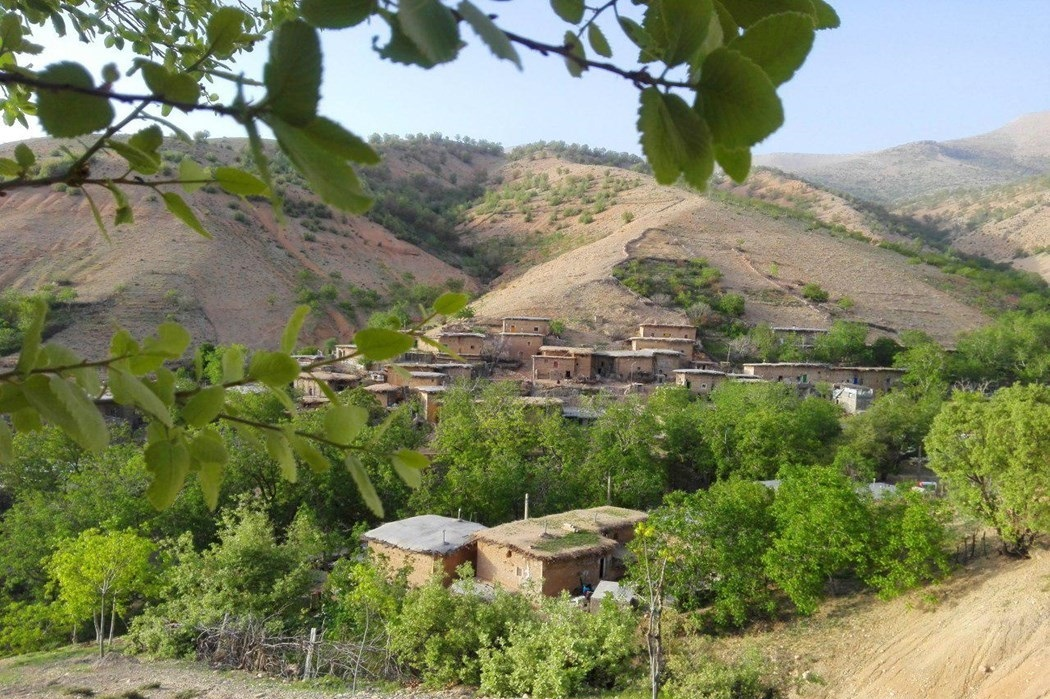
- Darreh-ye Akhund

- Location within Iran
- Coordinates: 30°48′27″N 51°01′37″E
- Country: Iran
- Province: Kohgiluyeh and Boyer-Ahmad
- County: Charam
- Bakhsh: Sarfaryab
- Rural District: Sarfaryab

Population (2006)
  - Total: 286
- Time zone: UTC+3:30 (IRST)
  - Summer (DST): UTC+4:30 (IRDT)

Darreh-ye Akhund (Persian: دره اخوند, also Romanized as Darreh-ye Ākhūnd) is a village in Sarfaryab Rural District, Sarfaryab District, Charam County, Kohgiluyeh and Boyer-Ahmad Province, Iran. At the 2006 census, its population was 286, in 63 families.
