= Deli Ji =

Deli Ji (Persian: دلي جي) may refer to:

- Deli Ji-ye Emamqoli
- Deli Ji-ye Gholam
- Deli Ji-ye Mandani
