= Siah Kut-e Anjireh =

Siah Kut-e Anjireh سياه كوت انجيره
- Village
- Country: Iran
- Province: Sistan and Baluchestan
- County: Khash
- Bakhsh: Nukabad
- Rural District: Nazil

Population (2006)
  - Total: 67
- Time zone: UTC+3:30 (IRST)
  - Summer (DST): UTC+4:30 (IRDT)

Siah Kut-e Anjireh (Persian: سياه كوت انجيره, also Romanized as Sīāh Kūt-e Ānjīreh) is a village in Nazil Rural District, Nukabad District, Khash County, Sistan and Baluchestan Province, Iran. At the 2006 census, its population was 67, in 13 families.
