= Shah Nazerabad =

Shah Nazerabad شه نظراباد
- Village
- Country: Iran
- Province: Sistan and Baluchestan
- County: Khash
- Bakhsh: Nukabad
- Rural District: Nazil

Population (2006)
  - Total: 75
- Time zone: UTC+3:30 (IRST)
  - Summer (DST): UTC+4:30 (IRDT)

Shah Nazerabad (Persian: شه نظراباد, also Romanized as Shah Naz̧erābād) is a village in Nazil Rural District, Nukabad District, Khash County, Sistan and Baluchestan Province, Iran. At the 2006 census, its population was 75, in 20 families.
