= Eslamabad-e Mashayekh =

Neighborhood in Kohgiluyeh and Boyer-Ahmad province, Iran

Eslamabad-e Mashayekh Persian: اسلام اباد مشايخ
- Neighborhood
- Location within Iran
- Coordinates: 30°48′39″N 50°50′42″E
- Country: Iran
- Province: Kohgiluyeh and Boyer-Ahmad
- County: Charam
- District: Sarfaryab
- City: Sarfaryab

Population (2011)
  - Total: 434
- Time zone: UTC+3:30 (IRST)

Eslamabad-e Mashayekh (Persian: اسلام ابادمشايخ (Note: Also romanized as Eslāmābād-e Mashāyekh) is a neighborhood in the city of Sarfaryab of Sarfaryab District, Charam County, Kohgiluyeh and Boyer-Ahmad province, Iran.

== Demographics ==
=== Population ===
At the time of the 2006 National Census, Eslamabad-e Mashayekh's population was 437 in 94 households, when it was a village in Sarfaryab Rural District of Kohgiluyeh County. The following census in 2011 counted 434 people in 110 households, by which time the district had been separated from the county in the establishment of Charam County.

After the census, the village of Bar Aftab-e Sarfaryab merged with Eslamabad-e Mashayekh to form the city of Sarfaryab.
