= Azizi =

Azizi may refer to:

== Geography ==
- Azizi-ye Olya, Kohgiluyeh and Boyer-Ahmad Province, Iran
- Azizi-ye Sofla, Kohgiluyeh and Boyer-Ahmad Province, Iran
- Azizi-ye Vosta, Kohgiluyeh and Boyer-Ahmad Province, Iran

== People ==
=== Family ===
Azizi is a sub-tribe of the larger Kheshgi Pashtun tribe.

=== Given name ===
- Azizi Johari, American model and actress
- Azizi Asadel, Indonesian singer, dancer and actress
- Azizi Hearn (born 1999), American football player
- Azizi Matt Rose, Malaysian footballer
- Sohail Ahmed, Pakistani comedian sometimes known as Azizi

== Surname ==
- Alireza Azizi, Iranian footballer
- Ebrahim Azizi, Iranian politician
- Farida Azizi, Afghan women's rights activist
- Khodadad Azizi, Iranian footballer
- Masoud Azizi, Afghan athlete
- Mohammad Azizi, Iranian footballer
- Mohammad Iqbal Azizi, Afghan governor
- Mostafa Azizi, Iranian film producer
- Pakhshan Azizi, Kurdish-Iranian human rights activist
- Rostam Azizi, Tanzanian politician
- Saghar Azizi (born 1977), Iranian actress
- Saifuddin Azizi, Chinese politician
- Hadi Azizi, Iranian businessman
- Yusef Azizi Bani-Torof (born 1951), Iranian journalist and activist

== Other uses ==
- Azizi Bank, an Afghan bank
- Fatawa Azizi, a fatwa book by 18th century Islamic scholar Shah Abdul Aziz
