= Do Rudi =

Do Rudi دورودي
- Village
- Location within Iran
- Coordinates: 28°37′31″N 60°57′53″E
- Country: Iran
- Province: Sistan and Baluchestan
- County: Khash
- Bakhsh: Nukabad
- Rural District: Taftan-e Jonubi

Population (2006)
  - Total: 224
- Time zone: UTC+3:30 (IRST)

Do Rudi (Persian: دورودي, also Romanized as Do Rūdī; also known as Darrūdī) is a village in Taftan-e Jonubi Rural District, Nukabad District, Khash County, Sistan and Baluchestan Province, Iran. At the 2006 census, its population was 224, in 53 families.
