= Murtak-e Pain =

Murtak-e Pain مورتك پائين
- Village
- Location within Iran
- Coordinates: 28°44′37″N 60°45′16″E
- Country: Iran
- Province: Sistan and Baluchestan
- County: Khash
- Bakhsh: Nukabad
- Rural District: Eskelabad

Population (2006)
  - Total: 269
- Time zone: UTC+3:30 (IRST)
  - Summer (DST): UTC+4:30 (IRDT)

Murtak-e Pain (Persian: مورتك پائين, also Romanized as Mūrtak-e Pā’īn; also known as Mūrtak and Mūrtak-e Bālā) is a village in Eskelabad Rural District, Nukabad District, Khash County, Sistan and Baluchestan Province, Iran. At the 2006 census, its population was 269, in 81 families.
