= Sheykh Habil =

Sheykh Habil شيخ هابيل
- Village
- Location within Iran
- Coordinates: 30°56′40″N 50°41′31″E
- Country: Iran
- Province: Kohgiluyeh and Boyer-Ahmad
- County: Charam
- Bakhsh: Sarfaryab
- Rural District: Poshteh-ye Zilayi

Population (2006)
  - Total: 219
- Time zone: UTC+3:30 (IRST)
  - Summer (DST): UTC+4:30 (IRDT)

Sheykh Habil (Persian: شيخ هابيل, also Romanized as Sheykh Hābīl; also known as Qal‘eh Golāb, Sheykh Ābil, Sheykh Hābīl-e Pā’īn, Sheykh Hābīl-e Soflá, and Sheykh Hābīl-e Vostá) is a village in Poshteh-ye Zilayi Rural District, Sarfaryab District, Charam County, Kohgiluyeh and Boyer-Ahmad Province, Iran. At the 2006 census, its population was 219, in 44 families.
