= Seh Godar =

Seh Godar سه گدار
- Village
- Location within Iran
- Coordinates: 30°58′00″N 50°28′00″E
- Country: Iran
- Province: Kohgiluyeh and Boyer-Ahmad
- County: Charam
- Bakhsh: Sarfaryab
- Rural District: Poshteh-ye Zilayi

Population (2006)
  - Total: 143
- Time zone: UTC+3:30 (IRST)
  - Summer (DST): UTC+4:30 (IRDT)

Seh Godar (Persian: سه گدار, also Romanized as Seh Godār; also known as Seh Godār-e Cham-e Āftāb) is a village in Poshteh-ye Zilayi Rural District, Sarfaryab District, Charam County, Kohgiluyeh and Boyer-Ahmad Province, Iran. At the 2006 census, its population was 143, in 24 families.
