= Andarun-e Bid Anjir =

Andarun-e Bid Anjir اندرون بيدانجير
- Village
- Location within Iran
- Coordinates: 31°00′58″N 50°40′23″E
- Country: Iran
- Province: Kohgiluyeh and Boyer-Ahmad
- County: Charam
- Bakhsh: Sarfaryab
- Rural District: Poshteh-ye Zilayi

Population (2006)
  - Total: 133
- Time zone: UTC+3:30 (IRST)
  - Summer (DST): UTC+4:30 (IRDT)

Andarun-e Bid Anjir (Persian: اندرون بيدانجير, also Romanized as Andarūn-e Bīd Ānjīr; also known as Andarūn) is a village in Poshteh-ye Zilayi Rural District, Sarfaryab District, Charam County, Kohgiluyeh and Boyer-Ahmad Province, Iran. At the 2006 census, its population was 133, in 20 families.
