= Kalleh Shahu =

Kalleh Shahu كله شاهو
- Village
- Location within Iran
- Coordinates: 28°25′14″N 60°24′09″E
- Country: Iran
- Province: Sistan and Baluchestan
- County: Khash
- Bakhsh: Nukabad
- Rural District: Gowhar Kuh

Population (2006)
  - Total: 172
- Time zone: UTC+3:30 (IRST)
  - Summer (DST): UTC+4:30 (IRDT)

Kalleh Shahu (Persian: كله شاهو, also Romanized as Kalleh Shāhū) is a village in Gowhar Kuh Rural District, Nukabad District, Khash County, Sistan and Baluchestan Province, Iran. At the 2006 census, its population was 172, in 39 families.
