= Gazmeh-ye Marishan =

Gazmeh-ye Marishan گزمه ماريشان
- Village
- Country: Iran
- Province: Sistan and Baluchestan
- County: Khash
- Bakhsh: Nukabad
- Rural District: Taftan-e Jonubi

Population (2006)
  - Total: 34
- Time zone: UTC+3:30 (IRST)
  - Summer (DST): UTC+4:30 (IRDT)

Gazmeh-ye Marishan (Persian: گزمه ماريشان, also Romanized as Gazmeh-ye Mārīshān) is a village in Taftan-e Jonubi Rural District, Nukabad District, Khash County, Sistan and Baluchestan Province, Iran. According to the 2006 census, its population was 34, with ten families.
