= Chal Bagh =

Chal Bagh چال باغ
- Village
- Location within Iran
- Coordinates: 30°59′11″N 50°40′40″E
- Country: Iran
- Province: Kohgiluyeh and Boyer-Ahmad
- County: Charam
- Bakhsh: Sarfaryab
- Rural District: Poshteh-ye Zilayi

Population (2006)
  - Total: 160
- Time zone: UTC+3:30 (IRST)
  - Summer (DST): UTC+4:30 (IRDT)

Chal Bagh (Persian: چال باغ, also Romanized as Chāl Bāgh; also known as Chālbāgh) is a village in Poshteh-ye Zilayi Rural District, Sarfaryab District, Charam County, Kohgiluyeh and Boyer-Ahmad Province, Iran. At the 2006 census, its population was 160, in 33 families.
