= Deli Savari =

Deli Savari دلي سواري
- Village
- Location within Iran
- Coordinates: 30°53′57″N 50°45′25″E
- Country: Iran
- Province: Kohgiluyeh and Boyer-Ahmad
- County: Charam
- Bakhsh: Sarfaryab
- Rural District: Poshteh-ye Zilayi

Population (2006)
  - Total: 68
- Time zone: UTC+3:30 (IRST)
  - Summer (DST): UTC+4:30 (IRDT)

Deli Savari (Persian: دلي سواري, also Romanized as Delī Savārī; also known as Delī Savār) is a village in Poshteh-ye Zilayi Rural District, Sarfaryab District, Charam County, Kohgiluyeh and Boyer-Ahmad Province, Iran. At the 2006 census, its population was 68, in 11 families.
