= Cham Asiyab =

Cham Asiyab چم اسياب
- Village
- Location within Iran
- Coordinates: 30°58′02″N 50°38′24″E
- Country: Iran
- Province: Kohgiluyeh and Boyer-Ahmad
- County: Charam
- Bakhsh: Sarfaryab
- Rural District: Poshteh-ye Zilayi

Population (2006)
  - Total: 62
- Time zone: UTC+3:30 (IRST)
  - Summer (DST): UTC+4:30 (IRDT)

Cham Asiyab (Persian: چم اسياب, also Romanized as Cham Āsīyāb; also known as Chamāsiyāb) is a village in Poshteh-ye Zilayi Rural District, Sarfaryab District, Charam County, Kohgiluyeh and Boyer-Ahmad Province, Iran. At the 2006 census, its population was 62, in 10 families.
