= Eydabad =

Village in Sistan and Baluchestan, Iran

Eydabad عيداباد
- Village
- Location within Iran
- Coordinates: 28°25′32″N 60°25′07″E
- Country: Iran
- Province: Sistan and Baluchestan
- County: Khash
- Bakhsh: Nukabad
- Rural District: Gowhar Kuh

Population (2006)
  - Total: 247
- Time zone: UTC+3:30 (IRST)
  - Summer (DST): UTC+4:30 (IRDT)

Eydabad (Persian: عيداباد, also Romanized as ‘Eydābād) is a village in Gowhar Kuh Rural District, Nukabad District, Khash County, Sistan and Baluchestan Province, Iran. At the 2006 census, its population was 247, in 61 families.
