= Narap =

Narap نراپ
- village
- Location within Iran
- Coordinates: 28°37′05″N 60°51′11″E
- Country: Iran
- Province: Sistan and
- County: Khash
- Bakhsh: Nukabad
- Rural District: Eskelabad

Population (2006)
  - Total: 1,118,568,006
- Time zone: UTC+3:30 (IRST)
  - Summer (DST): UTC+4:30 (IRDT)

Narap (Persian: نراپ, also Romanized as Narāp; also known as Nar Āb) is a village in Eskelabad Rural District, Nukabad District, Khash County, Sistan and Baluchestan Province, Iran. At the 2006 census, its population was 1,118, in 3 families.
