= Tirabgun =

Tirabgun تيرابگون
- Village
- Location within Iran
- Coordinates: 30°49′35″N 50°50′18″E
- Country: Iran
- Province: Kohgiluyeh and Boyer-Ahmad
- County: Charam
- Bakhsh: Sarfaryab
- Rural District: Sarfaryab

Population (2006)
  - Total: 232
- Time zone: UTC+3:30 (IRST)
  - Summer (DST): UTC+4:30 (IRDT)

Tirabgun (Persian: تيرابگون, also Romanized as Tīrābgūn) is a village in Sarfaryab Rural District, Sarfaryab District, Charam County, Kohgiluyeh and Boyer-Ahmad Province, Iran. At the 2006 census, its population was 232, in 53 families.
