= Eslamabad-e Deh Now =

Village in Kohgiluyeh and Boyer-Ahmad province, Iran

Eslamabad-e Deh Now Persian: اسلام اباد دهنو
- Village
- Location within Iran
- Coordinates: 30°47′38″N 50°50′22″E
- Country: Iran
- Province: Kohgiluyeh and Boyer-Ahmad
- County: Charam
- District: Sarfaryab
- Rural District: Sarfaryab

Population (2016)
  - Total: 514
- Time zone: UTC+3:30 (IRST)

Eslamabad-e Deh Now (Persian: اسلام اباددهنو) (Note: Also romanized as Eslāmābād-e Deh Now; also known as Eslāmābād) is a village in Sarfaryab Rural District of Sarfaryab District, Charam County, Kohgiluyeh and Boyer-Ahmad province, Iran.

== Demographics ==
=== Population ===
At the time of the 2006 National Census, the village's population was 489 in 100 households, when it was in Kohgiluyeh County. The following census in 2011 counted 390 people in 96 households, by which time the district had been separated from the county in the establishment of Charam County. The 2016 census measured the population of the village as 514 people in 140 households. It was the most populous village in its rural district.
