= Delyasar =

Delyasar or Delyaser (Persian: دلياسير), also rendered as Delyasir, may refer to:

- Delyasar-e Olya
- Delyasar-e Sofla
