= Mondan =

Village in Kohgiluyeh and Boyer-Ahmad province, Iran

Mondan Persian: مندان
- Village
- Location within Iran
- Coordinates: 30°52′22″N 50°47′12″E
- Country: Iran
- Province: Kohgiluyeh and Boyer-Ahmad
- County: Charam
- District: Sarfaryab
- Rural District: Poshteh-ye Zilayi

Population (2016)
  - Total: 593
- Time zone: UTC+3:30 (IRST)

Mondan (Persian: مندان) (Note: Also romanized as Mondān) is a village in Poshteh-ye Zilayi Rural District of Sarfaryab District, Charam County, Kohgiluyeh and Boyer-Ahmad province, Iran.

== Demographics ==
=== Population ===
At the time of the 2006 National Census, the village's population was 752 in 158 households, when it was in Kohgiluyeh County. The following census in 2011 counted 640 people in 163 households, by which time the district had been separated from the county in the establishment of Charam County. The 2016 census measured the population of the village as 593 people in 163 households. It was the most populous village in its rural district.
