= Deli Ji-ye Mandani =

Deli Ji-ye Mandani دلي جي ماندني
- Village
- Location within Iran
- Coordinates: 30°50′53″N 50°45′18″E
- Country: Iran
- Province: Kohgiluyeh and Boyer-Ahmad
- County: Charam
- Bakhsh: Sarfaryab
- Rural District: Poshteh-ye Zilayi

Population (2006)
  - Total: 24
- Time zone: UTC+3:30 (IRST)
  - Summer (DST): UTC+4:30 (IRDT)

Deli Ji-ye Mandani (Persian: دلي جي ماندني, also Romanized as Delī Jī-ye Māndanī; also known as Delī Jī-ye Soflá) is a village in Poshteh-ye Zilayi Rural District, Sarfaryab District, Charam County, Kohgiluyeh and Boyer-Ahmad Province, Iran. At the 2006 census, its population was 24, in 5 families.
