= Jurak-e Nasibollah =

Jurak-e Nasibollah جورك نصيب اله
- Village
- Location within Iran
- Coordinates: 30°56′45″N 50°43′24″E
- Country: Iran
- Province: Kohgiluyeh and Boyer-Ahmad
- County: Charam
- Bakhsh: Sarfaryab
- Rural District: Poshteh-ye Zilayi

Population (2006)
  - Total: 99
- Time zone: UTC+3:30 (IRST)
  - Summer (DST): UTC+4:30 (IRDT)

Jurak-e Nasibollah (Persian: جورك نصيب اله, also Romanized as Jūrak-e Naṣībollah; also known as Jorak-e Bālā) is a village in Poshteh-ye Zilayi Rural District, Sarfaryab District, Charam County, Kohgiluyeh and Boyer-Ahmad Province, Iran. At the 2006 census, its population was 99, in 20 families.
