= Lalabad-e Huti =

Lalabad-e Huti لال اباد هوتي
- Village
- Location within Iran
- Coordinates: 28°32′21″N 60°24′28″E
- Country: Iran
- Province: Sistan and Baluchestan
- County: Khash
- Bakhsh: Nukabad
- Rural District: Nazil

Population (2006)
  - Total: 75
- Time zone: UTC+3:30 (IRST)
  - Summer (DST): UTC+4:30 (IRDT)

Lalabad-e Huti (Persian: لال اباد هوتي, also Romanized as Lālābād-e Hūtī; also known as Lālābād) is a village in Nazil Rural District, Nukabad District, Khash County, Sistan and Baluchestan Province, Iran. At the 2006 census, its population was 75, in 17 families.
