= Jurak =

Jurak may refer to:

== People ==
- Darija Jurak (born 1984), Croatian tennis player
- Drago Jurak (1911–1994), Croatian painter
- Ed Jurak (born 1957), American baseball player
- Goran Jurak (born 1977), Slovenian basketball player
- Ljudevit Jurak (1881–1945), Croatian pathologist

== Places ==
- Jurak-e Nasibollah, a village in Kohgiluyeh and Boyer-Ahmad Province, Iran
- Jurak-e Nowzar, a village in Kohgiluyeh and Boyer-Ahmad Province, Iran
- Jurak, Zanjan, a village in Zanjan Province, Iran
- Jorak, Malaysia, on state route Jalan Jorak in Johor
