= Azizi-ye Sofla =

Azizi-ye Sofla عزيزي سفلي
- Village
- Location within Iran
- Coordinates: 30°47′58″N 50°49′32″E
- Country: Iran
- Province: Kohgiluyeh and Boyer-Ahmad
- County: Charam
- Bakhsh: Sarfaryab
- Rural District: Sarfaryab

Population (2006)
  - Total: 77
- Time zone: UTC+3:30 (IRST)
  - Summer (DST): UTC+4:30 (IRDT)

Azizi-ye Sofla (Persian: عزيزي سفلي, also Romanized as ‘Azīzī-ye Soflá; also known as ‘Azīzī-ye Pā’īn) is a village in Sarfaryab Rural District, Sarfaryab District, Charam County, Kohgiluyeh and Boyer-Ahmad Province, Iran. At the 2006 census, its population was 77, in 12 families.
