= Bidak-e Bala =

Bidak-e Bala بيدك بالا
- Village
- Location within Iran
- Coordinates: 28°39′22″N 60°43′42″E
- Country: Iran
- Province: Sistan and Baluchestan
- County: Khash
- Bakhsh: Nukabad
- Rural District: Eskelabad

Population (2006)
  - Total: 68
- Time zone: UTC+3:30 (IRST)
  - Summer (DST): UTC+4:30 (IRDT)

Bidak-e Bala (Persian: بيدك بالا, also Romanized as Bīdak-e Bālā; also known as Bīdak-e Vasaţī) is a village in Eskelabad Rural District, Nukabad District, Khash County, Sistan and Baluchestan Province, Iran. At the 2006 census, its population was 68, in 19 families.
