= Hulmadian-e Pain =

Hulmadian-e Pain هول ماديان پايين
- Village
- Location within Iran
- Coordinates: 28°42′51″N 60°40′25″E
- Country: Iran
- Province: Sistan and Baluchestan
- County: Khash
- Bakhsh: Nukabad
- Rural District: Nazil

Population (2006)
  - Total: 43
- Time zone: UTC+3:30 (IRST)
  - Summer (DST): UTC+4:30 (IRDT)

Hulmadian-e Pain (Persian: هول ماديان پايين, also Romanized as Hūlmādīān-e Pā’īn) is a village in Nazil Rural District, Nukabad District, Khash County, Sistan and Baluchestan Province, Iran. At the 2006 census, its population was 43, in 11 families.
