= Gharibabad, Eskelabad =

Gharibabad غريب اباد
- Village
- Location within Iran
- Coordinates: 28°25′58″N 60°29′21″E
- Country: Iran
- Province: Sistan and Baluchestan
- County: Khash
- Bakhsh: Nukabad
- Rural District: Eskelabad

Population (2006)
  - Total: 78
- Time zone: UTC+3:30 (IRST)
  - Summer (DST): UTC+4:30 (IRDT)

Gharibabad (Persian: غريب اباد, also Romanized as Gharībābād; also known as Pīreh Gaz and Gharībābād-e Shandak) is a village in Eskelabad Rural District, Nukabad District, Khash County, Sistan and Baluchestan Province, Iran. At the 2006 census, its population was 78, in 22 families.
