= Bid Kabgan =

Bid Kabgan (Persian: بيد کب گان) may refer to:

- Bid-e Kabkan
- Bid Kard Gam
