= Jurak-e Nowzar =

Jurak-e Nowzar جورك نوذر
- Village
- Location within Iran
- Coordinates: 30°55′27″N 50°41′50″E
- Country: Iran
- Province: Kohgiluyeh and Boyer-Ahmad
- County: Charam
- Bakhsh: Sarfaryab
- Rural District: Poshteh-ye Zilayi

Population (2006)
  - Total: 21
- Time zone: UTC+3:30 (IRST)
  - Summer (DST): UTC+4:30 (IRDT)

Jurak-e Nowzar (Persian: جورك نوذر, also Romanized as Jūrak-e Nowẕar; also known as Jorak-e Pāeen) is a village in Poshteh-ye Zilayi Rural District, Sarfaryab District, Charam County, Kohgiluyeh and Boyer-Ahmad Province, Iran. At the 2006 census, its population was 21, in 4 families.
