= Delyasar-e Sofla =

Delyasar-e Sofla دلياسيرسفلي
- Village
- Location within Iran
- Coordinates: 30°48′53″N 50°47′25″E
- Country: Iran
- Province: Kohgiluyeh and Boyer-Ahmad
- County: Charam
- Bakhsh: Sarfaryab
- Rural District: Sarfaryab

Population (2006)
  - Total: 76
- Time zone: UTC+3:30 (IRST)
  - Summer (DST): UTC+4:30 (IRDT)

Delyasar-e Sofla (Persian: دلياسيرسفلي, also Romanized as Delyāsar-e Soflá; also known as Delyāser and Delyāsīr) is a village in Sarfaryab Rural District, Sarfaryab District, Charam County, Kohgiluyeh and Boyer-Ahmad Province, Iran. At the 2006 census, its population was 76, in 16 families.
