= Hulmadian-e Bala =

Hulmadian-e Bala هول ماديان بالا
- Village
- Location within Iran
- Coordinates: 28°42′42″N 60°42′12″E
- Country: Iran
- Province: Sistan and Baluchestan
- County: Khash
- Bakhsh: Nukabad
- Rural District: Nazil

Population (2006)
  - Total: 93
- Time zone: UTC+3:30 (IRST)
  - Summer (DST): UTC+4:30 (IRDT)

Hulmadian-e Bala (Persian: هول ماديان بالا, also Romanized as Hūlmādīān-e Bālā) is a village in Nazil Rural District, Nukabad District, Khash County, Sistan and Baluchestan Province, Iran. At the 2006 census, its population was 93, in 19 families.
