= Tang-e Anar-e Vosta =

Tang-e Anar-e Vosta تنگ اناروسطي
- Village
- Location within Iran
- Coordinates: 30°55′31″N 50°40′00″E
- Country: Iran
- Province: Kohgiluyeh and Boyer-Ahmad
- County: Charam
- Bakhsh: Sarfaryab
- Rural District: Poshteh-ye Zilayi

Population (2006)
  - Total: 80
- Time zone: UTC+3:30 (IRST)
  - Summer (DST): UTC+4:30 (IRDT)

Tang-e Anar-e Vosta (Persian: تنگ اناروسطي, also Romanized as Tang-e Anār-e Vosţá; also known as Tang-e Anār) is a village in Poshteh-ye Zilayi Rural District, Sarfaryab District, Charam County, Kohgiluyeh and Boyer-Ahmad Province, Iran. At the 2006 census, its population was 80, in 19 families.
