= Azizi-ye Vosta =

Azizi-ye Vosta عزيزي وسطي
- Village
- Location within Iran
- Coordinates: 30°48′03″N 50°49′13″E
- Country: Iran
- Province: Kohgiluyeh and Boyer-Ahmad
- County: Charam
- Bakhsh: Sarfaryab
- Rural District: Sarfaryab

Population (2006)
  - Total: 131
- Time zone: UTC+3:30 (IRST)
  - Summer (DST): UTC+4:30 (IRDT)

Azizi-ye Vosta (Persian: عزيزي وسطي, also romanized as ‘Azīzī-ye Vosţá) is a village in Sarfaryab Rural District, Sarfaryab District, Charam County, Kohgiluyeh and Boyer-Ahmad Province, Iran. At the 2006 census, its population was 131, in 29 families.
