= Gharibabad-e Allah Dad =

Gharibabad-e Allah Dad غريب ابادالله داد
- Village
- Location within Iran
- Coordinates: 28°54′56″N 60°19′50″E
- Country: Iran
- Province: Sistan and Baluchestan
- County: Khash
- Bakhsh: Nukabad
- Rural District: Nazil

Population (2006)
  - Total: 39
- Time zone: UTC+3:30 (IRST)
  - Summer (DST): UTC+4:30 (IRDT)

Gharibabad-e Allah Dad (Persian: غريب ابادالله داد, also Romanized as Gharībābād-e Allah Dād; also known as Moḩammadābād; also known as Gharībābād) is a village in Nazil Rural District, Nukabad District, Khash County, Sistan and Baluchestan Province, Iran. At the 2006 census, its population was 39, in 12 families.
