= 2024 Gowhar Kuh attack =

- Part of Sistan and Baluchestan insurgency
- Location: Gowhar Kuh Shahrak, Taftan County, Sistan and Baluchestan province, Iran
- Date: October 26, 2024
- Target: Iranian police
- Attack type: Shooting
- Deaths: 10
- Injuries: 4
- Perpetrator: Jaish ul-Adl
- Motive: Anti-Shi'ism; Anti-Iranian sentiment

The 2024 Gowhar Kuh attack was a terrorist attack against an Iranian police station that killed 10 police officers inside their vehicles, two vehicles were shot at.

== Background ==
At this time the Sistan and Baluchestan insurgency and the Insurgency in Balochistan was taking place between Sunni Baloch groups and the Shia government of the Islamic Republic of Iran and secular organizations such as the Balochistan Liberation Army and other governmental armies including Pakistan's Pakistan Army and China's People's Liberation Army.

A few months before, in April 2024, there were clashes between the Jaish ul-Adl and Iranian police at the same police station; these killed 5 Iranian police officers.

== Attack ==
On October 26, 2024, Jaish ul-Adl militants attacked the police station in Gohar Kuh, in Sistan-Baluchistan Province, about 1,200 kilometres (750 mi) southeast of Tehran. HalVash, a Baloch advocacy group, reportedly released images of two convoy trucks painted with a green stripe on the side (used to distinguish police trucks from civilian ones) riddled with bullet holes; one of the images included a graphic image of two of the dead police officers inside the vehicle. Iranian state media stated that the clash was between the Iranian police and Sunni Muslim militants, though initially, the media only stated it was an attack by what it called "miscreants", in both reports no group was named.

== Aftermath ==
After the attack, the Interior Ministry of Iran released a statement on X saying: "Following the martyrdom of 10 border guards on the Goharkouh road in Taftan County, the Minister of Interior promptly assigned a team of police commanders and Ministry of Interior officials to investigate the details of this incident,". After the incident many videos were released of the attack on X, Facebook, and shared among WhatsApp groups with Jaish ul-Adl being accused for the attack. Later that day, Jaish ul-Adl claimed responsibility for the attack.

The Islamic Republic News Agency released the names of those who were killed which included, Alizadeh, Hasasah, Noorbakhsh, and Salehi as well as a number of members of the police force. Among them were Iman Darvishi, Alireza Aghajani, Mehdi Khamoshi, Nemat Nouri, and Hadi Zare.
