= Hulmadian =

Hulmadian (Persian: هول ماديان) may refer to:

- Hulmadian-e Bala
- Hulmadian-e Pain
