= Savari, Iran =

Village in Kohgiluyeh and Boyer-Ahmad province, Iran

Savari Persian: مندان
- Village
- Location within Iran
- Coordinates: 30°54′12″N 50°46′00″E
- Country: Iran
- Province: Kohgiluyeh and Boyer-Ahmad
- County: Charam
- District: Sarfaryab
- Rural District: Poshteh-ye Zilayi

Population (2016)
  - Total: 370
- Time zone: UTC+3:30 (IRST)

Savari (Persian: سواري) (Note: Also romanized as Savārī) is a village in, and the capital of, Poshteh-ye Zilayi Rural District of Sarfaryab District, Charam County, Kohgiluyeh and Boyer-Ahmad province, Iran.

== Demographics ==
=== Population ===
At the time of the 2006 National Census, the village's population was 590 in 128 households, when it was in Kohgiluyeh County. The following census in 2011 counted 433 people in 103 households, by which time the district had been separated from the county in the establishment of Charam County. The 2016 census measured the population of the village as 370 people in 97 households.
