= Bidak-e Sohrab =

Bidak-e Sohrab بيدك سهراب
- Village
- Location within Iran
- Coordinates: 30°55′25″N 50°41′31″E
- Country: Iran
- Province: Kohgiluyeh and Boyer-Ahmad
- County: Charam
- Bakhsh: Sarfaryab
- Rural District: Poshteh-ye Zilayi

Population (2006)
  - Total: 85
- Time zone: UTC+3:30 (IRST)
  - Summer (DST): UTC+4:30 (IRDT)

Bidak-e Sohrab (Persian: بيدك سهراب, also Romanized as Bīdak-e Sohrāb; also known as Bīdak-e Soflá) is a village in Poshteh-ye Zilayi Rural District, Sarfaryab District, Charam County, Kohgiluyeh and Boyer-Ahmad Province, Iran. At the 2006 census, its population was 85, in 17 families.
