= Lalabad-e Kol Kol =

Lalabad-e Kol Kol (Persian: لعل ابادكل كل) may refer to:

- Lalabad-e Kol Kol 1
- Lalabad-e Kol Kol 2
