= Deli Ji-ye Gholam =

Deli Ji-ye Gholam دلي جي غلام
- Village
- Location within Iran
- Coordinates: 30°50′59″N 50°45′27″E
- Country: Iran
- Province: Kohgiluyeh and Boyer-Ahmad
- County: Charam
- Bakhsh: Sarfaryab
- Rural District: Poshteh-ye Zilayi

Population (2006)
  - Total: 36
- Time zone: UTC+3:30 (IRST)
  - Summer (DST): UTC+4:30 (IRDT)

Deli Ji-ye Gholam (Persian: دلي جي غلام, also Romanized as Delī Jī-ye Gholām and Delījī Gholām; also known as Delīrch and Delīrech) is a village in Poshteh-ye Zilayi Rural District, Sarfaryab District, Charam County, Kohgiluyeh and Boyer-Ahmad Province, Iran. At the 2006 census, its population was 36, in 6 families.
