= Delyasar-e Olya =

Delyasar-e Olya دلياسيرعليا
- Village
- Location within Iran
- Coordinates: 30°48′53″N 50°46′51″E
- Country: Iran
- Province: Kohgiluyeh and Boyer-Ahmad
- County: Charam
- Bakhsh: Sarfaryab
- Rural District: Sarfaryab

Population (2006)
  - Total: 50
- Time zone: UTC+3:30 (IRST)
  - Summer (DST): UTC+4:30 (IRDT)

Delyasar-e Olya (Persian: دلياسيرعليا, also Romanized as Delyāsar-e ‘Olyā) is a village in Sarfaryab Rural District, Sarfaryab District, Charam County, Kohgiluyeh and Boyer-Ahmad Province, Iran. At the 2006 census, its population was 50, in 13 families.
