= Gharibabad-e Nark =

Gharibabad-e Nark غريب اباد نرك
- village
- Location within Iran
- Coordinates: 28°37′14″N 60°24′42″E
- Country: Iran
- Province: Sistan and Baluchestan
- County: Khash
- Bakhsh: Nukabad
- Rural District: Nazil

Population (2006)
  - Total: 35
- Time zone: UTC+3:30 (IRST)
  - Summer (DST): UTC+4:30 (IRDT)

Gharibabad-e Nark (Persian: غريب اباد نرك, also Romanized as Gharībābād-e Nark; also known as Gharībābād) is a village in Nazil Rural District, Nukabad District, Khash County, Sistan and Baluchestan Province, Iran. At the 2006 census, its population was 35, in 8 families.
