= Bidak-e Salar =

Bidak-e Salar بيدك سالار
- Village
- Location within Iran
- Coordinates: 30°54′58″N 50°42′21″E
- Country: Iran
- Province: Kohgiluyeh and Boyer-Ahmad
- County: Charam
- Bakhsh: Sarfaryab
- Rural District: Poshteh-ye Zilayi

Population (2006)
  - Total: 55
- Time zone: UTC+3:30 (IRST)
  - Summer (DST): UTC+4:30 (IRDT)

Bidak-e Salar (Persian: بيدك سالار, also Romanized as Bīdak-e Sālār; also known as Bīdak-e ‘Olyā) is a village in Poshteh-ye Zilayi Rural District, Sarfaryab District, Charam County, Kohgiluyeh and Boyer-Ahmad Province, Iran. At the 2006 census, its population was 55, in 9 families.
