= Azizi-ye Olya =

Azizi-ye Olya عزيزي عليا
- Village
- Location within Iran
- Coordinates: 30°48′06″N 50°49′04″E
- Country: Iran
- Province: Kohgiluyeh and Boyer-Ahmad
- County: Charam
- Bakhsh: Sarfaryab
- Rural District: Sarfaryab

Population (2006)
  - Total: 46
- Time zone: UTC+3:30 (IRST)
  - Summer (DST): UTC+4:30 (IRDT)

Azizi-ye Olya (Persian: عزيزي عليا, also Romanized as Azīzī-ye ‘Olyā and ‘Azīzī ‘Olyā; also known as ‘Azīzī and ‘Azīzī-ye Bālā) is a village in Sarfaryab Rural District, Sarfaryab District, Charam County, Kohgiluyeh and Boyer-Ahmad Province, Iran. At the 2006 census, its population was 46, in 9 families.
