= Lalehabad =

Lalehabad (Persian: لاله‌آباد) may refer to:

- Lalehabad, Sistan and Baluchestan
- Lalehabad District, in Mazandaran Province
- Lalehabad Rural District, in Mazandaran Province
