= Shirabad Rural District =

Rural district in Sistan and Baluchestan province, Iran

Shirabad Rural District Persian: دهستان شیرآباد
- Rural District
- Location within Iran
- Coordinates: 28°06′50″N 60°30′14″E
- Country: Iran
- Province: Sistan and Baluchestan
- County: Taftan
- District: Gowhar Kuh
- Capital: Kavari
- Time zone: UTC+3:30 (IRST)

Shirabad Rural District (Persian: دهستان شیرآباد) is in Gowhar Kuh District of Taftan County, Sistan and Baluchestan province, Iran. Its capital is the village of Kavari, whose population at the time of the 2016 National Census was 740 people in 193 households.

== History ==
In 2018, Nukabad District was separated from Khash County in the establishment of Taftan County, and Shirabad Rural District was created in the new Gowhar Kuh District.
