= Dejang =

Dejang (Persian: دجنگ), also known as Dejing or Dejank, may refer to:

- Dejang-e Bala
- Dejang-e Pain
