= Lalabad, Sistan and Baluchestan =

Lalabad لال اباد
- Village
- Location within Iran
- Coordinates: 28°23′59″N 60°26′26″E
- Country: Iran
- Province: Sistan and Baluchestan
- County: Khash
- Bakhsh: Nukabad
- Rural District: Gowhar Kuh

Population (2006)
  - Total: 190
- Time zone: UTC+3:30 (IRST)
  - Summer (DST): UTC+4:30 (IRDT)

Lalabad (Persian: لال اباد, also Romanized as Lālābād; also known as Lālehābād) is a village in Gowhar Kuh Rural District, Nukabad District, Khash County, Sistan and Baluchestan Province, Iran. At the 2006 census, its population was 190, in 34 families.
