= Qaribabad, Chaharmahal and Bakhtiari =

Qaribabad قريب اباد
- Village
- Location within Iran
- Coordinates: 32°23′53″N 50°17′40″E
- Country: Iran
- Province: Chaharmahal and Bakhtiari
- County: Kuhrang
- Bakhsh: Central
- Rural District: Dasht-e Zarrin

Population (2006)
  - Total: 221
- Time zone: UTC+3:30 (IRST)
  - Summer (DST): UTC+4:30 (IRDT)

Qaribabad (Persian: قريب اباد, also Romanized as Qarībābād) is a village in Dasht-e Zarrin Rural District, in the Central District of Kuhrang County, Chaharmahal and Bakhtiari Province, Iran. At the 2006 census, its population was 221, in 32 families. The village is populated by Lurs.
