= Bidak, Torbat-e Jam =

Bidak بيدك
- Village
- Location within Iran
- Coordinates: 35°34′51″N 60°29′19″E
- Country: Iran
- Province: Razavi Khorasan
- County: Torbat-e Jam
- Bakhsh: Central
- Rural District: Jolgeh-ye Musaabad

Population (2006)
  - Total: 406
- Time zone: UTC+3:30 (IRST)
  - Summer (DST): UTC+4:30 (IRDT)

Bidak (Persian: بيدك, also Romanized as Bīdak) is a village in Jolgeh-ye Musaabad Rural District, in the Central District of Torbat-e Jam County, Razavi Khorasan Province, Iran. At the 2006 census, its population was 406, in 77 families.
