= Bidak-e Olya =

Bidak-e Olya بيدك عليا
- Village
- Location within Iran
- Coordinates: 30°27′50″N 51°07′49″E
- Country: Iran
- Province: Kohgiluyeh and Boyer-Ahmad
- County: Basht
- Bakhsh: Central
- Rural District: Kuh Mareh Khami

Population (2006)
  - Total: 160
- Time zone: UTC+3:30 (IRST)
  - Summer (DST): UTC+4:30 (IRDT)

Bidak-e Olya (Persian: بيدك عليا, also Romanized as Bīdak-e ‘Olyā; also known as Bīdak) is a village in Kuh Mareh Khami Rural District, in the Central District of Basht County, Kohgiluyeh and Boyer-Ahmad Province, Iran. At the 2006 census, its population was 160, in 39 families.
