= Bidak, Fasa =

Bidak بيدك
- Village
- Location within Iran
- Coordinates: 29°09′26″N 53°24′52″E
- Country: Iran
- Province: Fars
- County: Fasa
- Bakhsh: Central
- Rural District: Jangal

Population (2006)
  - Total: 92
- Time zone: UTC+3:30 (IRST)
  - Summer (DST): UTC+4:30 (IRDT)

Bidak (Persian: بيدك, also Romanized as Bīdak) is a village in Jangal Rural District, in the Central District of Fasa County, Fars province, Iran. At the 2006 census, its population was 92, in 22 families.
