= Bidak, Sabzevar =

Bidak بيدك
- Village
- Location within Iran
- Coordinates: 35°35′45″N 57°09′14″E
- Country: Iran
- Province: Razavi Khorasan
- County: Sabzevar
- Bakhsh: Rud Ab
- Rural District: Kuh Hamayi

Population (2006)
  - Total: 31
- Time zone: UTC+3:30 (IRST)
  - Summer (DST): UTC+4:30 (IRDT)

Bidak (Persian: بيدك, also Romanized as Bīdak; also known as Kalāteh-ye Bīdak) is a village in Kuh Hamayi Rural District, Rud Ab District, Sabzevar County, Razavi Khorasan Province, Iran. At the 2006 census, its population was 31, in 8 families.
