= Bid-e Kabkan =

Bid-e Kabkan بيدكبكان
- Village
- Location within Iran
- Coordinates: 31°31′23″N 60°17′28″E
- Country: Iran
- Province: South Khorasan
- County: Nehbandan
- Bakhsh: Central
- Rural District: Neh

Population (2006)
  - Total: 19
- Time zone: UTC+3:30 (IRST)
  - Summer (DST): UTC+4:30 (IRDT)

Bid-e Kabkan (Persian: بيدكبكان, also Romanized as Bīd-e Kabkān and Bīd Kabgān) is a village in Neh Rural District, in the Central District of Nehbandan County, South Khorasan Province, Iran. At the 2006 census, its population was 19, in 4 families.
