= Sarfaryab, Iran =

City in Kohgiluyeh and Boyer-Ahmad province, Iran

Sarfaryab Persian: سرفارياب
- City
- Location within Iran
- Coordinates: 30°48′16″N 50°51′09″E
- Country: Iran
- Province: Kohgiluyeh and Boyer-Ahmad
- County: Charam
- District: Sarfaryab

Population (2016)
  - Total: 1,995
- Time zone: UTC+3:30 (IRST)

Sarfaryab (Persian: سرفارياب) (Note: Formerly the village of Bar Aftab-e Sarfaryab (برافتاب سرفارياب), also romanized as Bar Āftāb-e Sarfāryāb; also known as Bar Āftāb) is a city in, and the capital of, Sarfaryab District of Charam County, Kohgiluyeh and Boyer-Ahmad province, Iran. It also serves as the administrative center for Sarfaryab Rural District.

== Demographics ==
=== Population ===
At the time of the 2006 National Census, the population (as the village of Bar Aftab-e Sarfaryab in Sarfaryab Rural District of Kohgiluyeh County) was 1,968 in 453 households. The following census in 2011 counted 1,723 people in 407 households, by which time the district had been separated from the county in the establishment of Charam County. The 2016 census measured the population as 1,995 people in 536 households, by which time Bar Aftab-e Sarfaryab had merged with the village of Eslamabad-e Mashayekh to form the city of Sarfaryab.
