= Lalabad-e Seyyed Jafari =

Lalabad-e Seyyed Jafari لعل ابادسيدجعفري
- Village
- Location within Iran
- Coordinates: 34°14′13″N 46°45′59″E
- Country: Iran
- Province: Kermanshah
- County: Kermanshah
- Bakhsh: Mahidasht
- Rural District: Mahidasht

Population (2006)
  - Total: 294
- Time zone: UTC+3:30 (IRST)
  - Summer (DST): UTC+4:30 (IRDT)

Lalabad-e Seyyed Jafari (Persian: لعل ابادسيدجعفري, also Romanized as La‘lābād-e Seyyed Ja‘farī) is a village in Mahidasht Rural District, Mahidasht District, Kermanshah County, Kermanshah Province, Iran. At the 2006 census, its population was 294, in 63 families.
