= Lalabad-e Seyyed Sadeq =

Village in Kermanshah, Iran

Lalabad-e Seyyed Sadeq لعل ابادسيدصادق
- Village
- Location within Iran
- Coordinates: 34°13′22″N 46°47′17″E
- Country: Iran
- Province: Kermanshah
- County: Kermanshah
- Bakhsh: Mahidasht
- Rural District: Mahidasht

Population (2006)
  - Total: 183
- Time zone: UTC+3:30 (IRST)
  - Summer (DST): UTC+4:30 (IRDT)

Lalabad-e Seyyed Sadeq (Persian: لعل ابادسيدصادق, also Romanized as La‘lābād-e Seyyed Şādeq) is a village in Mahidasht Rural District, Mahidasht District, Kermanshah County, Kermanshah Province, Iran. At the 2006 census, its population was 183, in 36 families.
