= Gharibabad, Fars =

Gharibabad غريب اباد
- Village
- Location within Iran
- Coordinates: 29°22′41″N 51°48′48″E
- Country: Iran
- Province: Fars
- County: Kazerun
- Bakhsh: Jereh and Baladeh
- Rural District: Dadin

Population (2006)
  - Total: 86
- Time zone: UTC+3:30 (IRST)
  - Summer (DST): UTC+4:30 (IRDT)

Gharibabad (Persian: غريب اباد, also Romanized as Gharībābād) is a village in Dadin Rural District, Jereh and Baladeh District, Kazerun County, Fars province, Iran. At the 2006 census, its population was 86, in 18 families.
