= Chah-e Ahmad Rural District =

Rural district in Sistan and Baluchestan province, Iran

Chah-e Ahmad Rural District Persian: دهستان چاه احمد
- Rural District
- Location within Iran
- Coordinates: 28°28′53″N 60°19′56″E
- Country: Iran
- Province: Sistan and Baluchestan
- County: Taftan
- District: Nazil
- Capital: Chah-e Ahmad
- Time zone: UTC+3:30 (IRST)

Chah-e Ahmad Rural District (Persian: دهستان چاه احمد) is in Nazil District of Taftan County, Sistan and Baluchestan province, Iran. Its capital is the village of Chah-e Ahmad, whose population at the time of the 2016 National Census was 377 people in 103 households.

== History ==
In 2018, Nukabad District was separated from Khash County in the establishment of Taftan County, which was divided into three districts of two rural districts each, and Chah-e Ahmad Rural District was created in the new Nazil District.
