= Lalabad-e Hoseyn-e Qolikhani =

Lalabad-e Hoseyn-e Qolikhani لعل ابادحسينقلي خاني
- Village
- Location within Iran
- Coordinates: 34°14′34″N 46°41′41″E
- Country: Iran
- Province: Kermanshah
- County: Kermanshah
- Bakhsh: Mahidasht
- Rural District: Mahidasht

Population (2006)
  - Total: 414
- Time zone: UTC+3:30 (IRST)
  - Summer (DST): UTC+4:30 (IRDT)

Lalabad-e Hoseyn-e Qolikhani (Persian: لعل ابادحسينقلي خاني, also Romanize as Lā‘lābād-e Ḩoseyn-e Qolīkhānī) is a village in Mahidasht Rural District, Mahidasht District, Kermanshah County, Kermanshah Province, Iran. At the 2006 census, its population was 414, in 83 families.
