= Lalabad, Yazd =

Lalabad لعل اباد
- Village
- Location within Iran
- Coordinates: 31°37′15″N 53°53′05″E
- Country: Iran
- Province: Yazd
- County: Taft
- Bakhsh: Central
- Rural District: Aliabad

Population (2006)
  - Total: 15
- Time zone: UTC+3:30 (IRST)
  - Summer (DST): UTC+4:30 (IRDT)

Lalabad (Persian: لعل اباد, romanized: La‘lābād) is a village in Aliabad Rural District, in the Central District of Taft County, Yazd Province, Iran. At the 2006 census, its population was 15, in 7 families.
