= Lalabad-e Kol Kol-e Yek =

Lalabad-e Kol Kol-e Yek لعل ابادكل كل يك
- Village
- Location within Iran
- Coordinates: 34°13′35″N 46°46′46″E
- Country: Iran
- Province: Kermanshah
- County: Kermanshah
- Bakhsh: Mahidasht
- Rural District: Mahidasht

Population (2006)
  - Total: 117
- Time zone: UTC+3:30 (IRST)
  - Summer (DST): UTC+4:30 (IRDT)

Lalabad-e Kol Kol-e Yek (Persian: لعل ابادكل كل يك, also Romanized as La‘lābād-e Kol Kol-e Yek) is a village in Mahidasht Rural District, Mahidasht District, Kermanshah County, Kermanshah Province, Iran. At the 2006 census, its population was 117, in 22 families.
