= Bid Kard Gam =

Bid Kard Gam بيدكردگم
- Village
- Location within Iran
- Coordinates: 31°31′00″N 60°17′57″E
- Country: Iran
- Province: South Khorasan
- County: Nehbandan
- Bakhsh: Central
- Rural District: Neh

Population (2006)
  - Total: 68
- Time zone: UTC+3:30 (IRST)
  - Summer (DST): UTC+4:30 (IRDT)

Bid Kard Gam (Persian: بيدكردگم, also Romanized as Bīd Kard Gam; also known as Bīd Kabgān, Bīdak-e-Yekān, and Bīdak Yekān) is a village in Neh Rural District, in the Central District of Nehbandan County, South Khorasan Province, Iran. At the 2006 census, its population was 68, in 9 families.
