= Bidak, Afghanistan =

Bidak
- Location in Afghanistan
- Coordinates: 34°41′22″N 62°31′23″E
- Country: Afghanistan
- Province: Badghis Province
- Time zone: + 4.30

Bidak is a village in Badghis Province in north western Afghanistan.
