= Lalabad-e Kol Kol-e Do =

Lalabad-e Kol Kol-e Do لعل ابادكل كل دو
- Village
- Location within Iran
- Coordinates: 34°13′33″N 46°46′58″E
- Country: Iran
- Province: Kermanshah
- County: Kermanshah
- Bakhsh: Mahidasht
- Rural District: Mahidasht

Population (2006)
  - Total: 81
- Time zone: UTC+3:30 (IRST)
  - Summer (DST): UTC+4:30 (IRDT)

Lalabad-e Kol Kol-e Do (Persian: لعل ابادكل كل دو, also Romanized as La‘lābād-e Kol Kol-e Do; also known as Mīr ‘Abd ol Bāqī) is a village in Mahidasht Rural District, Mahidasht District, Kermanshah County, Kermanshah Province, Iran. At the 2006 census, its population was 81, in 18 families.
