= Gowhar Kuh District =

District in Sistan and Baluchestan province, Iran

Gowhar Kuh District Persian: بخش گوهرکوه
- District
- Location within Iran
- Coordinates: 28°09′13″N 60°31′26″E
- Country: Iran
- Province: Sistan and Baluchestan
- County: Taftan
- Capital: Shirabad
- Time zone: UTC+3:30 (IRST)

Gowhar Kuh District (Persian: بخش گوهرکوه) is in Taftan County, Sistan and Baluchestan province, Iran. Its capital is the village of Shirabad, whose population at the time of the 2016 National Census was 751 people in 267 households.

== History ==
In 2018, Nukabad District was separated from Khash County in the establishment of Taftan County, which was divided into three districts of two rural districts each, with Nukabad as its capital and only city.

== Demographics ==
=== Administrative divisions ===
Gowhar Kuh District
Administrative Divisions
Gowhar Kuh RD
Shirabad RD
RD = Rural District
