= Nukabad =

City in Sistan and Baluchestan province, Iran

Nukabad Persian: نوك آباد
- City
- Location within Iran
- Coordinates: 28°32′23″N 60°45′30″E
- Country: Iran
- Province: Sistan and Baluchestan
- County: Taftan
- District: Central

Population (2016)
  - Total: 5,261
- Time zone: UTC+3:30 (IRST)

Nukabad (Persian: نوك آباد) (Note: Also romanized as Nok Abad and Nūkābād) is a city in the Central District of Taftan County, Sistan and Baluchestan province, Iran, serving as capital of the county.

== Demographics ==
=== Population ===
At the time of the 2006 National Census, the city's population was 2,821 in 623 households, when it was capital of the former Nukabad District of Khash County. The following census in 2011 counted 3,193 people in 706 households. The 2016 census measured the population of the city as 5,261 people in 1,370 households.

In 2018, the district was separated from the county in the establishment of Taftan County, and Nukabad was transferred to the new Central District as the county's capital.
