= Nazil District =

District in Sistan and Baluchestan province, Iran

Nazil District Persian: بخش نازیل
- District
- Location within Iran
- Coordinates: 28°34′58″N 60°26′13″E
- Country: Iran
- Province: Sistan and Baluchestan
- County: Taftan
- Capital: Nazil
- Time zone: UTC+3:30 (IRST)

Nazil District (Persian: بخش نازیل) is in Taftan County, Sistan and Baluchestan province, Iran. Its capital is the village of Nazil, whose population at the time of the 2016 National Census was 419, in 140 households.

== History ==
In 2018, Nukabad District was separated from Khash County in the establishment of Taftan County, which was divided into three districts of two rural districts each, with Nukabad as its capital and only city.

== Demographics ==
=== Administrative divisions ===
Nazil District
Administrative Divisions
Chah-e Ahmad RD
Nazil RD
RD = Rural District
