= Central District (Taftan County) =

District in Sistan and Baluchestan province, Iran

Central District (Taftan County) Persian: بخش مرکزی شهرستان تفتان
- District
- Location within Iran
- Coordinates: 28°33′42″N 60°47′46″E
- Country: Iran
- Province: Sistan and Baluchestan
- County: Taftan
- Capital: Deh-e Pabid
- Time zone: UTC+3:30 (IRST)

The Central District of Taftan County (Persian: بخش مرکزی شهرستان تفتان) is in Sistan and Baluchestan province, Iran. Its capital is the village of Deh-e Pabid, whose population at the time of the 2016 National Census was 1,213 people in 341 households.

== History ==
In 2018, Nukabad District was separated from Khash County in the establishment of Taftan County, which was divided into three districts of two rural districts each, with Nukabad as its capital and only city.

== Demographics ==
=== Administrative divisions ===
Central District (Taftan County)
Administrative Divisions
Eskelabad RD
Taftan-e Jonubi RD
Nukabad (city)
RD = Rural District
