= Gowhar Kuh Rural District =

Rural district in Sistan and Baluchestan province, Iran

Gowhar Kuh Rural District Persian: دهستان گوهركوه
- Rural District
- Location within Iran
- Coordinates: 28°25′52″N 60°27′44″E
- Country: Iran
- Province: Sistan and Baluchestan
- County: Taftan
- District: Gowhar Kuh
- Capital: Gowhar Shahr-e Chah-e Darkhati

Population (2016)
  - Total: 10,078
- Time zone: UTC+3:30 (IRST)

Gowhar Kuh Rural District (Persian: دهستان گوهركوه) is in Gowhar Kuh District of Taftan Coun...

.

........... ......ty, Sistan and Baluchestan province, Iran. Its capital is the village of Gowhar Shahr-e Chah-e Darkhati.

== Demographics ==
=== Population ===
At the time of the 2006 National Census, the rural district's population (as a part of the former Nukabad District of Khash County) was 9,100 in 1,887 households. There were 8,383 inhabitants in 2,048 households at the following census of 2011. The 2016 census measured the population of the rural district as 10,078 in 3,024 households. The most populous of its 195 villages was Shirabad, with 751 people.

In 2018, the district was separated from the county in the establishment of Taftan County, and the rural district was transferred to the new Gowhar Kuh District.

== See also ==
Gowhar Kuh Shahrak, a village in the rural district
