= Eskelabad Rural District =

Rural district in Sistan and Baluchestan province, Iran

Eskelabad Rural District Persian: دهستان اسكل آباد
- Rural District
- Location within Iran
- Coordinates: 28°34′43″N 60°40′43″E
- Country: Iran
- Province: Sistan and Baluchestan
- County: Taftan
- District: Central
- Capital: Eskelabad

Population (2016)
  - Total: 6,015
- Time zone: UTC+3:30 (IRST)

Eskelabad Rural District (Persian: دهستان اسكل آباد) is in the Central District of Taftan County, Sistan and Baluchestan province, Iran. Its capital is the village of Eskelabad. The previous capital of the rural district was the village of Deh-e Pabid.

== Demographics ==
=== Population ===
At the time of the 2006 National Census, the rural district's population (as a part of the former Nukabad District of Khash County) was 6,527 in 1,461 households. There were 6,295 inhabitants in 1,578 households at the following census of 2011. The 2016 census measured the population of the rural district as 6,015 in 1,800 households. The most populous of its 72 villages was Deh-e Pabid, with 1,213 people.

In 2018, the district was separated from the county in the establishment of Taftan County, and the rural district was transferred to the new Central District.
