= Sarfaryab Rural District =

Rural district in Kohgiluyeh and Boyer-Ahmad province, Iran

Sarfaryab Rural District Persian: دهستان سرفاریاب
- Rural District
- Location within Iran
- Coordinates: 30°48′33″N 50°54′46″E
- Country: Iran
- Province: Kohgiluyeh and Boyer-Ahmad
- County: Charam
- District: Sarfaryab
- Capital: Sarfaryab

Population (2016)
  - Total: 3,165
- Time zone: UTC+3:30 (IRST)

Sarfaryab Rural District (Persian: دهستان سرفاریاب) is in Sarfaryab District of Charam County, Kohgiluyeh and Boyer-Ahmad province, Iran. It is administered from the city of Sarfaryab. (Note: Formerly the village of Bar Aftab-e Sarfaryab)

== Demographics ==
=== Population ===
At the time of the 2006 National Census, the rural district's population (as a part of Kohgiluyeh County) was 7,032 in 1,500 households. There were 5,295 inhabitants in 1,316 households at the following census of 2011, by which time the district had been separated from the county in the establishment of Charam County. The 2016 census measured the population of the rural district as 3,165 in 895 households. The most populous of its 51 villages was Eslamabad-e Deh Now, with 514 people.
