= Taftan County =

County in Sistan and Baluchestan province, Iran

Taftan County Persian: شهرستان تفتان
- County
- Location of Taftan County in Sistan and Baluchestan province (center, green)

- Location of Sistan and Baluchestan province in Iran
- Coordinates: 28°20′01″N 60°38′00″E
- Country: Iran
- Province: Sistan and Baluchestan
- Capital: Nukabad
- Districts: Central, Gowhar Kuh, Nazil
- Time zone: UTC+3:30 (IRST)

Taftan County (Persian: شهرستان تفتان) is in Sistan and Baluchestan province, Iran. Its capital is the city of Nukabad, whose population at the time of the 2016 National Census was 5,261 people in 1,370 households.

== History ==
In 2018, Nukabad District was separated from Khash County in the establishment of Taftan County, which was divided into three districts of two rural districts each, with Nukabad as its capital and only city.

== Demographics ==
=== Administrative divisions ===
Taftan County's administrative structure is shown in the following table.

Taftan County
Administrative Divisions
Central District
Eskelabad RD
Taftan-e Jonubi RD
Nukabad (city)
Gowhar Kuh District
Gowhar Kuh RD
Shirabad RD
Nazil District
Chah-e Ahmad RD
Nazil RD
RD = Rural District

== See also ==
Media related to Taftan County at Wikimedia Commons
