= Poshteh-ye Zilayi Rural District =

Rural district in Kohgiluyeh and Boyer-Ahmad province, Iran

Poshteh-ye Zilayi Rural District Persian: دهستان پشته ذيلائي
- Rural District
- Location within Iran
- Coordinates: 30°55′49″N 50°45′14″E
- Country: Iran
- Province: Kohgiluyeh and Boyer-Ahmad
- County: Charam
- District: Sarfaryab
- Capital: Savari

Population (2016)
  - Total: 2,416
- Time zone: UTC+3:30 (IRST)

Poshteh-ye Zilayi Rural District (Persian: دهستان پشته ذيلائي) is in Sarfaryab District of Charam County, Kohgiluyeh and Boyer-Ahmad province, Iran. Its capital is the village of Savari.

== Demographics ==
=== Population ===
At the time of the 2006 National Census, the rural district's population (as a part of Kohgiluyeh County) was 4,217 in 831 households. There were 2,781 inhabitants in 660 households at the following census of 2011, by which time the district had been separated from the county in the establishment of Charam County. The 2016 census measured the population of the rural district as 2,416 in 635 households. The most populous of its 50 villages was Mondan, with 593 people.
