= Taftan-e Jonubi Rural District =

Rural district in Sistan and Baluchestan province, Iran

Taftan-e Jonubi Rural District Persian: دهستان تفتان جنوبي
- Rural District
- Location within Iran
- Coordinates: 28°30′23″N 60°56′34″E
- Country: Iran
- Province: Sistan and Baluchestan
- County: Taftan
- District: Central
- Capital: Tamandan

Population (2016)
  - Total: 11,725
- Time zone: UTC+3:30 (IRST)

Taftan-e Jonubi Rural District (Persian: دهستان تفتان جنوبي) is located in the Central District of Taftan County, Sistan and Baluchestan province, Iran. Its capital is the village of Tamandan. The previous capital of the rural district was the village of Dejang-e Bala.

== Demographics ==
=== Population ===
At the time of the 2006 National Census, the rural district's population (as a part of the former Nukabad District of Khash County) was 9,351 in 1,974 households. There were 9,300 inhabitants in 2,185 households at the following census of 2011. The 2016 census measured the population of the rural district as 11,725 in 3,206 households. The most populous of its 125 villages was Narun, with 826 people.

In 2018, the district was separated from the county in the establishment of Taftan County, and the rural district was transferred to the new Central District.
