= Nazil Rural District =

Rural district in Sistan and Baluchestan province, Iran

Nazil Rural District Persian: دهستان نازيل
- Rural District
- Location within Iran
- Coordinates: 28°41′06″N 60°39′54″E
- Country: Iran
- Province: Sistan and Baluchestan
- County: Taftan
- District: Nazil
- Capital: Bahrabad

Population (2016)
  - Total: 11,097
- Time zone: UTC+3:30 (IRST)

Nazil Rural District (Persian: دهستان نازيل) is in Nazil District of Taftan County, Sistan and Baluchestan province, Iran. Its capital is the village of Bahrabad. The previous capital of the rural district was the village of Nazil.

== Demographics ==
=== Population ===
At the time of the 2006 National Census, the rural district's population (as a part of the former Nukabad District of Khash County) was 10,573 in 2,491 households. There were 9,335 inhabitants in 2,161 households at the following census of 2011. The 2016 census measured the population of the rural district as 11,097 in 3,201 households. The most populous of its 167 villages was Kalleh Shahtut, with 521 people.

In 2018, the district was separated from the county in the establishment of Taftan County, and the rural district was transferred to the new Nazil District.
