= Sarfaryab District =

District in Kohgiluyeh and Boyer-Ahmad province, Iran

Sarfaryab District Persian: بخش سرفاریاب
- District
- Location within Iran
- Coordinates: 30°52′37″N 50°50′49″E
- Country: Iran
- Province: Kohgiluyeh and Boyer-Ahmad
- County: Charam
- Capital: Sarfaryab

Population (2016)
  - Total: 7,576
- Time zone: UTC+3:30 (IRST)

Sarfaryab District (Persian: بخش سرفاریاب) is in Charam County, Kohgiluyeh and Boyer-Ahmad province, Iran. Its capital is the city of Sarfaryab. (Note: Formerly the village of Bar Aftab-e Sarfaryab)

== History ==
After the 2011 National Census, the village of Bar Aftab-e Sarfaryab was elevated to city status as Sarfaryab.

== Demographics ==
=== Population ===
At the time of the 2006 census, the district's population (as a part of Kohgiluyeh County) was 11,249 in 2,331 households. The following census in 2011 counted 8,076 people in 1,976 households, by which time the district had been separated from the county in the establishment of Charam County. The 2016 census measured the population of the district as 7,576 inhabitants in 2,066 households.

=== Administrative divisions ===
Sarfaryab District Population (Note: As a part of Kohgiluyeh County at the 2006 census)
Administrative Divisions	2006	2011	2016
Poshteh-ye Zilayi RD	4,217	2,781	2,416
Sarfaryab RD	7,032	5,295	3,165
Sarfaryab (city)			1,995
Total	11,249	8,076	7,576
RD = Rural District
