= Nukabad District =

Former district in Sistan and Baluchestan province, Iran

Nukabad District Persian: بخش نوک‌آباد
- Former District
- Location within Iran
- Coordinates: 28°20′01″N 60°38′00″E
- Country: Iran
- Province: Sistan and Baluchestan
- County: Khash
- Capital: Nukabad

Population (2016)
  - Total: 44,176
- Time zone: UTC+3:30 (IRST)

Nukabad District (Persian: بخش نوک‌آباد) is a former administrative division of Khash County, Sistan and Baluchestan province, Iran. Its capital was the city of Nukabad.

== History ==
After the 2016 National Census, the district was separated from the county in the establishment of Taftan County.

== Demographics ==
=== Population ===
At the time of the 2006 census, the district's population was 38,372 in 8,436 households. The following census in 2011 counted 36,506 people in 8,678 households. The 2016 census measured the population of the district as 44,176 inhabitants in 12,601 households.

=== Administrative divisions ===
Nukabad District Population
Administrative Divisions	2006	2011	2016
Eskelabad RD	6,527	6,295	6,015
Gowhar Kuh RD	9,100	8,383	10,078
Nazil RD	10,573	9,335	11,097
Taftan-e Jonubi RD	9,351	9,300	11,725
Nukabad (city)	2,821	3,193	5,261
Total	38,372	36,506	44,176
RD = Rural District
