= Bakhsh =

Third-level administrative division (district) of Iran

A bakhsh (Persian: بخش, also romanized as baxš) is a third-level administrative division of Iran. While sometimes translated as "county", it is more accurately translated as "district", similar to a township in the United States or a district of England.

In Iran, the provinces (first-level divisions) (استان, ostān) consist of several counties (second-level divisions) (شهرستان, shahrestān), and the counties consist of one or more districts (third-level divisions) (بخش, bakhsh). A district consists of a combination of cities (شهر shahr) and rural districts (دهستان, dehestān) (fourth-level divisions). The official governor of a district is called a bakhshdar, the head of the bakhshdari office. Rural districts are a collection of villages and their surrounding lands. One of the cities of the county is named its capital.

The following table indicates the 2006 structure of Khash County, one of the 26 counties that constitute Sistan and Baluchestan province.

- The Central District contained five rural districts and one city, the capital
- Irandegan District contained two rural districts and no cities
- Nukabad District contained four rural districts and one city

Districts may occasionally be separated from the county to become counties of their own. For example, Nukabad District separated on 14 December 2018 to become Taftan County, after which the city of Nukabad was elevated to capital status within the newly created Central District of Taftan.

Khash County (2006)
Administrative Divisions	Pop.
Central District	111,114
Esmailabad Rural District	16,940
Karvandar Rural District	6,028
Kuh Sefid Rural District	10,603
Poshtkuh Rural District	13,612
Sangan Rural District	7,248
Khash (city)	56,683
Irandegan District	12,432
Irandegan Rural District	4,232
Kahnuk Rural District	8,200
Nukabad District^{1}	38,372
Eskelabad Rural District	6,527
Gowhar Kuh Rural District	9,100
Nazil Rural District	10,573
Taftan-e Jonubi Rural District	9,351
Nukabad (city)	2,821
Total	161,918
^{1}Became a part of Taftan County
