= Bilari, Iran =

Village in Sistan and Baluchestan province, Iran

Bilari Persian: بيلري
- Village
- Location within Iran
- Coordinates: 28°16′32″N 61°23′00″E
- Country: Iran
- Province: Sistan and Baluchestan
- County: Khash
- District: Poshtkuh
- Rural District: Bilari

Population (2016)
  - Total: 411
- Time zone: UTC+3:30 (IRST)

Bilari (Persian: بيلري) (Note: Also romanized as Bīlarī) is a village in, and the capital of, Bilari Rural District of Poshtkuh District, Khash County, Sistan and Baluchestan province, Iran.

== Demographics ==
=== Population ===
At the time of the 2006 National Census, the village's population was 659 in 125 households, when it was in Poshtkuh Rural District of the Central District. The following census in 2011 counted 437 people in 96 households. The 2016 census measured the population of the village as 411 people in 112 households.

In 2019, the rural district was separated from the district in the formation of Poshtkuh District. Bilari was transferred to Bilari Rural District created in the district.
