= Pil Gushkan =

Pil Gushkan پيل گوشكان
- Village
- Location within Iran
- Coordinates: 28°29′00″N 61°30′00″E
- Country: Iran
- Province: Sistan and Baluchestan
- County: Khash
- Bakhsh: Central
- Rural District: Poshtkuh

Population (2006)
  - Total: 227
- Time zone: UTC+3:30 (IRST)
  - Summer (DST): UTC+4:30 (IRDT)

Pil Gushkan (Persian: پيل گوشكان, also Romanized as Pīl Gūshkān; also known as Pīl Kūshkān) is a village in Poshtkuh Rural District, in the Central District of Khash County, Sistan and Baluchestan Province, Iran. At the 2006 census, its population was 227, in 44 families.
