= Kalchat-e Heydarabad =

Kalchat-e Heydarabad كلچات حيدرآباد
- Village
- Interactive map of Kalchat-e Heydarabad
- Country: Iran
- Province: Sistan and Baluchestan
- County: Khash
- Bakhsh: Central
- Rural District: Esmailabad

Population (2006)
  - Total: 167
- Time zone: UTC+3:30 (IRST)
  - Summer (DST): UTC+4:30 (IRDT)

Kalchat-e Heydarabad (Persian: كلچات حيدرآباد, also Romanized as Kalchāt-e Ḩeydarābād; also known as Kalchāt-e Valīābād) is a village in Esmailabad Rural District, in the Central District of Khash County, Sistan and Baluchestan Province, Iran. At the 2006 census, its population was 167, in 31 families.
