= Posht Giaban =

Posht Giaban پشت گيابان
- Village
- Interactive map of Posht Giaban
- Country: Iran
- Province: Sistan and Baluchestan
- County: Khash
- Bakhsh: Central
- Rural District: Poshtkuh

Population (2006)
  - Total: 175
- Time zone: UTC+3:30 (IRST)
  - Summer (DST): UTC+4:30 (IRDT)

Posht Giaban (Persian: پشت گيابان, also Romanized as Posht Gīābān) is a village in Poshtkuh Rural District, in the Central District of Khash County, Sistan and Baluchestan Province, Iran. At the 2006 census, its population was 175, in 30 families.
