= Espidak =

Espidak اسپيدك
- Village
- Interactive map of Espidak
- Country: Iran
- Province: Sistan and Baluchestan
- County: Khash
- Bakhsh: Central
- Rural District: Esmailabad

Population (2006)
  - Total: 198
- Time zone: UTC+3:30 (IRST)
  - Summer (DST): UTC+4:30 (IRDT)

Espidak (Persian: اسپيدك, also Romanized as Espīdak) is a village in Esmailabad Rural District, in the Central District of Khash County, Sistan and Baluchestan Province, Iran. At the 2006 census, its population was 198, in 36 families.
