= Terati-ye Sang =

Terati-ye Sang تراتي سنگ
- Village
- Country: Iran
- Province: Sistan and Baluchestan
- County: Khash
- Bakhsh: Central
- Rural District: Sangan

Population (2006)
  - Total: 36
- Time zone: UTC+3:30 (IRST)
  - Summer (DST): UTC+4:30 (IRDT)

Terati-ye Sang (Persian: تراتي سنگ, also Romanized as Terātī-ye Sang) is a village in Sangan Rural District, in the Central District of Khash County, Sistan and Baluchestan Province, Iran. At the 2006 census, its population was 36, in 16 families.
