= Sarsaru =

Sarsaru سرسارو
- Village
- Location within Iran
- Coordinates: 28°28′00″N 61°16′00″E
- Country: Iran
- Province: Sistan and Baluchestan
- County: Khash
- Bakhsh: Central
- Rural District: Sangan

Population (2006)
  - Total: 115
- Time zone: UTC+3:30 (IRST)
  - Summer (DST): UTC+4:30 (IRDT)

Sarsaru (Persian: سرسارو, also Romanized as Sarsārū; also known as Sarsārūd) is a village in Sangan Rural District, in the Central District of Khash County, Sistan and Baluchestan Province, Iran. At the 2006 census, its population was 115, in 40 families.
