= Seh Chahan =

Seh Chahan سه چاهان
- Village
- Location within Iran
- Coordinates: 28°14′52″N 60°59′54″E
- Country: Iran
- Province: Sistan and Baluchestan
- County: Khash
- Bakhsh: Central
- Rural District: Esmailabad

Population (2006)
  - Total: 54
- Time zone: UTC+3:30 (IRST)
  - Summer (DST): UTC+4:30 (IRDT)

Seh Chahan (Persian: سه چاهان, also Romanized as Seh Chāhān) is a village in Esmailabad Rural District, in the Central District of Khash County, Sistan and Baluchestan Province, Iran. At the 2006 census, its population was 54, in 9 families.
