= Gazeh Shahnavazi =

Gazeh Shahnavazi غزہ شاہنوازی
- village
- Country: Iran
- Province: Sistan and Baluchestan
- County: Khash
- Bakhsh: Central
- Rural District: Poshtkuh

Population (2006)
  - Total: 51
- Time zone: UTC+3:30 (IRST)
  - Summer (DST): UTC+4:30 (IRDT)

Gazeh Shahnavazi (Balochi: غزہ شاہنوازی) also Romanized as Gazeh Shahnavāzī) is a village in Poshtkuh Rural District, in the Central District of Khash County, Sistan and Baluchestan Province, Iran. At the 2006 census, its population was 51, in 10 families.
