= Suleki =

Suleki سولكي
- Village
- Location within Iran
- Coordinates: 28°36′09″N 61°18′08″E
- Country: Iran
- Province: Sistan and Baluchestan
- County: Khash
- Bakhsh: Central
- Rural District: Sangan

Population (2006)
  - Total: 114
- Time zone: UTC+3:30 (IRST)
  - Summer (DST): UTC+4:30 (IRDT)

Suleki (Persian: سولكي, also Romanized as Sūlekī; also known asSelūkī) is a village in Sangan Rural District, in the Central District of Khash County, Sistan and Baluchestan Province, Iran. At the 2006 census, its population was 114, in 31 families.
