= Kashtag-e Dastgerd =

Kashtag-e Dastgerd كاشتاگ دستگرد
- Village
- Country: Iran
- Province: Sistan and Baluchestan
- County: Khash
- Bakhsh: Central
- Rural District: Poshtkuh

Population (2006)
  - Total: 40
- Time zone: UTC+3:30 (IRST)
  - Summer (DST): UTC+4:30 (IRDT)

Kashtag-e Dastgerd (Persian: كاشتاگ دستگرد, also Romanized as Kāshtāg-e Dastgerd) is a village in Poshtkuh Rural District, in the Central District of Khash County, Sistan and Baluchestan Province, Iran. At the 2006 census, its population was 40, in 6 families.
