= Padgan-e Golzar =

Padgan-e Golzar پدگان گلزار
- Village
- Location within Iran
- Coordinates: 27°54′17″N 60°44′31″E
- Country: Iran
- Province: Sistan and Baluchestan
- County: Khash
- Bakhsh: Central
- Rural District: Karvandar

Population (2006)
  - Total: 187
- Time zone: UTC+3:30 (IRST)
  - Summer (DST): UTC+4:30 (IRDT)

Padgan-e Golzar (Persian: پدگان گلزار, also Romanized as Padgān-e Golzār; also known as Padgān) is a village in Karvandar Rural District, in the Central District of Khash County, Sistan and Baluchestan Province, Iran. At the 2006 census, its population was 187, in 44 families.
