= 2025 Gunich Village raid in Khash =

2025 Gunich Village Raid
Date	1 July 2025
Location	Gunich, Khash, Sistan and Baluchestan province, Iran
Result	Iranian security forces: Protests suppressed

Belligerents
Iranian security forces	Baloch protesters

Strength
Unknown	Unknown

Casualties and losses
None	2 killed 10 injured 50+ arrested

The Gunich Village raid in Khash was a coordinated raid by Iranian Security Forces on the village of Gunich in the Khash city on 1 July 2025, which resulted in the deaths of 2 women, namely "Khan Bibi Bamri" and "Lal Bibi Bamri" along with the injury of 10 others. The raid was orchestrated by Iranian forces, including units and State security forces. According to human rights organizations and other media outlets, 2 women were killed, 10 were injured and more than 50 arrested. The raid on Gonich has been interpreted as part of a broader pattern of state violence to suppress protests in the name of counterinsurgency in Iran. Analysts have drawn parallels to the 2022 "Bloody Friday" incident in Zahedan, during which Iranian security forces fatally shot dozens of Balochi protesters.

== The attack ==
On 1 July 2025, Basij and state security forces coordinated a deadly attack on civilians in Gunich, a small village in Khash country, located in Iran’s Sistan and Baluchestan province. Launched in the early hours of 1 July, over a span of approximately 5 hours, Iranian forces entered Gunich, while all the men in the village were absent. They stormed the homes of the villagers and opened fire, according to human rights reports.

In an attempt to prevent the violent attack, the women blocked the entrance of their village and burnt tires to prevent armed forces from entering. Social media footage documented scenes of women shouting in protest, throwing stones, and standing their ground as security forces responded with live ammunition and crowd-control weapons. 10 women were injured, 2 women were killed and 50 were arrested. Within the injured women, one woman suffered a miscarriage due to the injuries she suffered from the attack.

Reports claim the targets of the raid were the Bameri family, known for their social activism against the Government of Iran.

== Casualties ==
The raid resulted in the deaths of two 40 year old women. They were Khan-Bibi Bameri, who was shot during the incursion and Lal-Bibi Bameri, who was injured critically by gun fire, and later died from her wounds.

Among the ten injured, four were girls under the age of 18. Victims were evacuated, some in critical condition, to Khash Hospital. Reports indicate that at least one pregnant woman suffered a miscarriage due to injuries sustained during the raid, underlining the indiscriminate and violent nature of the operation.

== Responses ==
In the aftermath of the attack, Maryam Rajavi, President-elect of the National Council of Resistance of Iran (NCRI), issued a statement condemning the raid and paying tribute to the women of Gunich. On X, she wrote:

"The brutal attack by the Revolutionary Guards and State Security forces on the defenseless women of Gunich village once again reveals the ugly face of the misogynistic clerical regime..."

The resistance of the women was praised as a symbol of resistance. Local sources describe the village atmosphere as "warlike," leaving children traumatized and families broken.

According to reports, this act of resistance was not merely spontaneous but represented a legacy of generational defiance by a community long subjected to systemic neglect, discrimination, and violence. Reports compare the Gunich raid evoked memories of the 2022 "Bloody Friday" massacre in Zahedan, where dozens of Baluch protesters were killed by Iranian security forces. The raid has reignited outrage among civil society groups and human rights organizations, who view the attack as part of a wider pattern of systematic repression and ethnically motivated violence carried out by the Iranian regime.

== See also ==
- 2022 Khash massacre
- 2022 Zahedan massacre
