= Gazdanan =

Gazdanan گزدانان
- Village
- Location within Iran
- Coordinates: 28°29′41″N 61°29′38″E
- Country: Iran
- Province: Sistan and Baluchestan
- County: Khash
- Bakhsh: Central
- Rural District: Poshtkuh

Population (2006)
  - Total: 47
- Time zone: UTC+3:30 (IRST)
  - Summer (DST): UTC+4:30 (IRDT)

Gazdanan (Persian: گزدانان, also Romanized as Gazdānān; also known as Gazdāneh) is a village in Poshtkuh Rural District, in the Central District of Khash County, Sistan and Baluchestan Province, Iran. At the 2006 census, its population was 47 consisting of 9 families.
