= Kalleh Kaz =

Kalleh Kaz كله كز
- Village
- Location within Iran
- Coordinates: 28°35′47″N 61°18′08″E
- Country: Iran
- Province: Sistan and Baluchestan
- County: Khash
- Bakhsh: Central
- Rural District: Sangan

Population (2006)
  - Total: 67
- Time zone: UTC+3:30 (IRST)
  - Summer (DST): UTC+4:30 (IRDT)

Kalleh Kaz (Persian: كله كز; also known as Kalleh Gaz and Kateh Gaz) is a village in Sangan Rural District, in the Central District of Khash County, Sistan and Baluchestan Province, Iran. At the 2006 census, its population was 67, in 13 families.
