= Tang-e Hanzab =

Tang-e Hanzab تنگ هنزاب
- Village
- Location within Iran
- Coordinates: 27°54′22″N 60°46′58″E
- Country: Iran
- Province: Sistan and Baluchestan
- County: Khash
- Bakhsh: Central
- Rural District: Karvandar

Population (2006)
  - Total: 24
- Time zone: UTC+3:30 (IRST)
  - Summer (DST): UTC+4:30 (IRDT)

Tang-e Hanzab (Persian: تنگ هنزاب, also Romanized as Tang-e Hanzāb) is a village in Karvandar Rural District, in the Central District of Khash County, Sistan and Baluchestan Province, Iran. At the 2006 census, its population was 24, in 5 families.
