= Eftekharabad =

Eftekharabad افتخاراباد
- Village
- Location within Iran
- Coordinates: 28°15′15″N 61°11′22″E
- Country: Iran
- Province: Sistan and Baluchestan
- County: Khash
- Bakhsh: Central
- Rural District: Esmailabad

Population (2006)
  - Total: 1,212
- Time zone: UTC+3:30 (IRST)
  - Summer (DST): UTC+4:30 (IRDT)

Eftekharabad (Persian: افتخاراباد, also Romanized as Eftekhārābād; also known as Kalāteh-ye Gorūbānā) is a village in Esmailabad Rural District, in the Central District of Khash County, Sistan and Baluchestan Province, Iran. At the 2006 census, its population was 1,212, in 222 families.
