= Tappeh-ye Lal Mohammad =

Tappeh-ye Lal Mohammad تپه لال محمد
- Village
- Location within Iran
- Coordinates: 28°32′56″N 61°20′02″E
- Country: Iran
- Province: Sistan and Baluchestan
- County: Khash
- Bakhsh: Central
- Rural District: Sangan

Population (2006)
  - Total: 155
- Time zone: UTC+3:30 (IRST)
  - Summer (DST): UTC+4:30 (IRDT)

Tappeh-ye Lal Mohammad (Persian: تپه لال محمد, also Romanized as Tappeh-ye Lāl Moḩammad) is a village in Sangan Rural District, in the Central District of Khash County, Sistan and Baluchestan Province, Iran. At the 2006 census, its population was 155, in 35 families.
