= Kalkali =

Kalkali كلكلي
- Village
- Location within Iran
- Coordinates: 28°08′50″N 61°18′56″E
- Country: Iran
- Province: Sistan and Baluchestan
- County: Khash
- Bakhsh: Central
- Rural District: Kuh Sefid

Population (2006)
  - Total: 339
- Time zone: UTC+3:30 (IRST)
  - Summer (DST): UTC+4:30 (IRDT)

Kalkali (Persian: كلكلي, also romanized as Kalkalī) is a village in Kuh Sefid Rural District, in the Central District of Khash County, Sistan and Baluchestan Province, Iran. At the 2006 census, its population was 339, in 66 families.
