= Borhanabad =

Borhanabad برهان اباد
- Village
- Location within Iran
- Coordinates: 28°12′15″N 61°20′04″E
- Country: Iran
- Province: Sistan and Baluchestan
- County: Khash
- Bakhsh: Central
- Rural District: Kuh Sefid

Population (2006)
  - Total: 106
- Time zone: UTC+3:30 (IRST)
  - Summer (DST): UTC+4:30 (IRDT)

Borhanabad (Persian: برهان اباد, also Romanized as Borhānābād) is a village in Kuh Sefid Rural District, in the Central District of Khash County, Sistan and Baluchestan Province, Iran. At the 2006 census, its population was 106, in 23 families.
