= Kand-e Zard =

Kand-e Zard كندزرد
- Village
- Country: Iran
- Province: Sistan and Baluchestan
- County: Khash
- Bakhsh: Central
- Rural District: Sangan

Population (2006)
  - Total: 218
- Time zone: UTC+3:30 (IRST)
  - Summer (DST): UTC+4:30 (IRDT)

Kand-e Zard (Persian: كندزرد) is a village in Sangan Rural District, in the Central District of Khash County, Sistan and Baluchestan Province, Iran. At the 2006 census, its population was 218, in 50 families.
