= Shahid Chamran =

Shahid Chamran (Persian: شهید چمران) may refer to:

- Shahid Chamran, Khuzestan
- Shahid Chamran, Lorestan
- Shahid Chamran, Sistan and Baluchestan
- Shahid Chamran University of Ahvaz, in Khuzestan Province
- Mostafa Chamran, Iranian physicist and politician

== See also ==
- Chamran (disambiguation)
