= Afzalabad, Khash =

Village in Sistan and Baluchestan province, Iran

Afzalabad Persian: افضل‌آباد
- Village
- Location within Iran
- Coordinates: 28°19′43″N 61°27′09″E
- Country: Iran
- Province: Sistan and Baluchestan
- County: Khash
- District: Poshtkuh
- Rural District: Poshtkuh

Population (2016)
  - Total: 172
- Time zone: UTC+3:30 (IRST)

Afzalabad (Persian: افضل‌آباد) is a village in, and the capital of, Poshtkuh Rural District of Poshtkuh District, Khash County, Sistan and Baluchestan province, Iran.

== Demographics ==
=== Population ===
At the time of the 2006 National Census, the village's population was 514 in 82 households, when it was in the Central District. The following census in 2011 counted 159 people in 43 households. The 2016 census measured the population of the village as 172 people in 58 households.

In 2019, the rural district was separated from the district in the formation of Poshtkuh District.
