= Pigol =

Pigol پي گل
- Village
- Location within Iran
- Coordinates: 27°57′36″N 60°48′49″E
- Country: Iran
- Province: Sistan and Baluchestan
- County: Khash
- Bakhsh: Central
- Rural District: Karvandar

Population (2006)
  - Total: 250
- Time zone: UTC+3:30 (IRST)
  - Summer (DST): UTC+4:30 (IRDT)

Pigol (Persian: پي گل, also Romanized as Pīgol) is a village in Karvandar Rural District, in the Central District of Khash County, Sistan and Baluchestan Province, Iran. As of the 2006 census, its population was 250, in 49 families.
