= Kalak Dinar =

Kalak Dinar كلك دينار
- Village
- Location within Iran
- Coordinates: 27°57′00″N 61°39′00″E
- Country: Iran
- Province: Sistan and Baluchestan
- County: Khash
- Bakhsh: Central
- Rural District: Kuh Sefid

Population (2006)
  - Total: 29
- Time zone: UTC+3:30 (IRST)
  - Summer (DST): UTC+4:30 (IRDT)

Kalak Dinar (Persian: كلك دينار, also Romanized as Kalak Dīnār; also known as Kalleh Dīnār) is a village in Kuh Sefid Rural District, in the Central District of Khash County, Sistan and Baluchestan Province, Iran. At the 2006 census, its population was 29, in 5 families.
