= Kulaku =

Kulaku كولكو
- Village
- Location within Iran
- Coordinates: 28°30′12″N 61°16′04″E
- Country: Iran
- Province: Sistan and Baluchestan
- County: Khash
- Bakhsh: Central
- Rural District: Sangan

Population (2006)
  - Total: 329
- Time zone: UTC+3:30 (IRST)
  - Summer (DST): UTC+4:30 (IRDT)

Kulaku (Persian: كولكو, also Romanized as Kūlakū; also known as Kallūkī, Koolookoo, Kor Koh, Kor Kūh, Kūlkūh, Kūlūkū, and Kūlū Kūh) is a village in Sangan Rural District, in the Central District of Khash County, Sistan and Baluchestan Province, Iran. At the 2006 census, its population was 329, in 55 families.
