= Sabz Gaz =

Sabz Gaz (Persian: سبزگز) may refer to:

- Sabz Gaz-e Olya
- Sabz Gaz-e Sofla
- Sabz Gaz-e Vosta
