= Shahrak-e Posht Giaban =

Village in Sistan and Baluchestan province, Iran

Shahrak-e Posht Giaban Persian: شهرك پشت گيابان
- Village
- Location within Iran
- Coordinates: 28°15′10″N 61°29′38″E
- Country: Iran
- Province: Sistan and Baluchestan
- County: Khash
- District: Poshtkuh
- Rural District: Poshtkuh

Population (2016)
  - Total: 1,223
- Time zone: UTC+3:30 (IRST)

Shahrak-e Posht Giaban (Persian: شهرك پشت گيابان) (Note: Also romanized as Shahrak-e Posht Gīābān; also known as Towḩīdābād) is a village in Poshtkuh Rural District of Poshtkuh District, Khash County, Sistan and Baluchestan province, Iran.

== Demographics ==
=== Population ===
At the time of the 2006 National Census, the village's population was 831 in 149 households, when it was in the Central District. The following census in 2011 counted 1,197 people in 248 households. The 2016 census measured the population of the village as 1,223 people in 275 households. It was the most populous village in its rural district.

In 2019, the rural district was separated from the district in the formation of Poshtkuh District.
