= Judin, Iran =

Judin جودين
- Village
- Country: Iran
- Province: Sistan and Baluchestan
- County: Khash
- Bakhsh: Central
- Rural District: Kuh Sefid

Population (2006)
  - Total: 37
- Time zone: UTC+3:30 (IRST)
  - Summer (DST): UTC+4:30 (IRDT)

Judin (Persian: جودين, also Romanized as Jūdīn) is a village in Kuh Sefid Rural District, in the Central District of Khash County, Sistan and Baluchestan Province, Iran. At the 2006 census, its population was 37, in 6 families.
