= Bayatabad =

Village in Sistan and Baluchestan province, Iran

Bayatabad Persian: بيت اباد
- Village
- Location within Iran
- Coordinates: 28°09′48″N 61°15′18″E
- Country: Iran
- Province: Sistan and Baluchestan
- County: Khash
- District: Central
- Rural District: Kuh Sefid

Population (2016)
  - Total: 826
- Time zone: UTC+3:30 (IRST)

Bayatabad (Persian: بيت اباد) (Note: Also romanized as Bayātābād and Beytābād) is a village in, and the capital of, Kuh Sefid Rural District of the Central District of Khash County, Sistan and Baluchestan province, Iran.

== Demographics ==
=== Population ===
At the time of the 2006 National Census, the village's population was 1,093 in 208 households. The following census in 2011 counted 922 people in 211 households. The 2016 census measured the population of the village as 826 people in 232 households.
