= Sangan, Khash =

Village in Sistan and Baluchestan province, Iran

Sangan Persian: سنگان
- Village
- Location within Iran
- Coordinates: 28°35′11″N 61°19′14″E
- Country: Iran
- Province: Sistan and Baluchestan
- County: Khash
- District: Central
- Rural District: Sangan

Population (2016)
  - Total: 224
- Time zone: UTC+3:30 (IRST)

Sangan (Persian: سنگان) is a village in, and the capital of, Sangan Rural District of the Central District of Khash County, Sistan and Baluchestan province, Iran. The previous capital of the rural district was the village of Esmailabad, now a city.

== Demographics ==
=== Population ===
At the time of the 2006 National Census, the village's population was 471 in 95 households. The following census in 2011 counted 383 people in 61 households. The 2016 census measured the population of the village as 224 people in 62 households.
