= Gunich =

Gunich گونيچ
- Village
- Location within Iran
- Coordinates: 27°56′45″N 60°41′52″E
- Country: Iran
- Province: Sistan and Baluchestan
- County: Khash
- Bakhsh: Central
- Rural District: Karvandar

Population (2006)
  - Total: 277
- Time zone: UTC+3:30 (IRST)
  - Summer (DST): UTC+4:30 (IRDT)

Gunich (Persian: گونيچ, also Romanized as Gūnīch and Govānīch; also known as Gūnīj) is a village in Karvandar Rural District, in the Central District of Khash County, Sistan and Baluchestan Province, Iran. At the 2006 census, its population was 277, in 54 families.
