= Sabz Gaz-e Olya =

Sabz Gaz-e Olya سبزگزعليا
- Village
- Location within Iran
- Coordinates: 28°21′11″N 61°29′00″E
- Country: Iran
- Province: Sistan and Baluchestan
- County: Khash
- Bakhsh: Central
- Rural District: Poshtkuh

Population (2006)
  - Total: 196
- Time zone: UTC+3:30 (IRST)
  - Summer (DST): UTC+4:30 (IRDT)

Sabz Gaz-e Olya (Persian: سبزگزعليا, also Romanized as Sabz Gaz-e ‘Olyā; also known as Sabs Gaz-e Bālā and Sabz Gaz-e Mīānī) is a village in Poshtkuh Rural District, in the Central District of Khash County, Sistan and Baluchestan Province, Iran. At the 2006 census, its population was 196, in 41 families.
