= Naseri, Sistan and Baluchestan =

Village in Sistan and Baluchestan province, Iran

Naseri Persian: ناصری
- Village
- Location within Iran
- Coordinates: 28°10′38″N 61°14′45″E
- Country: Iran
- Province: Sistan and Baluchestan
- County: Khash
- District: Central
- Rural District: Kuh Sefid

Population (2016)
  - Total: 1,806
- Time zone: UTC+3:30 (IRST)

Naseri (Persian: ناصری) is a village in Kuh Sefid Rural District of the Central District of Khash County, Sistan and Baluchestan province, Iran.

== Demographics ==
=== Population ===
At the time of the 2006 National Census, the village's population was 1,332 in 288 households. The following census in 2011 counted 1,604 people in 402 households. The 2016 census measured the population of the village as 1,806 people in 557 households. It was the most populous village in its rural district.
