= Muzan, Sistan and Baluchestan =

Muzan موزن
- Village
- Location within Iran
- Coordinates: 27°59′29″N 61°34′13″E
- Country: Iran
- Province: Sistan and Baluchestan
- County: Khash
- Bakhsh: Central
- Rural District: Kuh Sefid

Population (2006)
  - Total: 73
- Time zone: UTC+3:30 (IRST)
  - Summer (DST): UTC+4:30 (IRDT)

Muzan (Persian: موزن, also Romanized as Mūzan; also known as Mozīn and Mūzīn) is a village in Kuh Sefid Rural District, in the Central District of Khash County, Sistan and Baluchestan Province, Iran. At the 2006 census, its population was 73, in 16 families.
