= Gurchan, Sistan and Baluchestan =

Village in Sistan and Baluchestan province, Iran

Gurchan Persian: گورچان
- Village
- Location within Iran
- Coordinates: 28°19′41″N 61°27′19″E
- Country: Iran
- Province: Sistan and Baluchestan
- County: Khash
- District: Poshtkuh
- Rural District: Poshtkuh

Population (2016)
  - Total: 385
- Time zone: UTC+3:30 (IRST)

Gurchan (Persian: گورچان) is a village in Poshtkuh Rural District of Poshtkuh District, Khash County, Sistan and Baluchestan province, Iran, serving as capital of the district.

== Demographics ==
=== Population ===
At the time of the 2006 National Census, the village's population was 506 in 90 households, when it was in the Central District. The following census in 2011 counted 252 people in 66 households. The 2016 census measured the population of the village as 385 people in 139 households.

In 2019, the rural district was separated from the district in the formation of Poshtkuh District.
