= Kahn-e Nuk, Khash =

Village in Sistan and Baluchestan province, Iran

Kahn-e Nuk Persian: کهن نوک
- Village
- Location within Iran
- Coordinates: 27°57′02″N 60°42′42″E
- Country: Iran
- Province: Sistan and Baluchestan
- County: Khash
- District: Central
- Rural District: Karvandar

Population (2016)
  - Total: 457
- Time zone: UTC+3:30 (IRST)

Kahn-e Nuk (Persian: کهن نوک) is a village in Karvandar Rural District of the Central District of Khash County, Sistan and Baluchestan province, Iran.

== Demographics ==
=== Population ===
At the time of the 2006 National Census, the village's population was 447 in 95 households. The following census in 2011 counted 444 people in 104 households. The 2016 census measured the population of the village as 457 people in 138 households. It was the most populous village in its rural district.
