= Sabz Gaz-e Sofla =

Sabz Gaz-e Sofla سبزگزسفلي
- Village
- Location within Iran
- Coordinates: 28°21′28″N 61°29′20″E
- Country: Iran
- Province: Sistan and Baluchestan
- County: Khash
- Bakhsh: Central
- Rural District: Poshtkuh

Population (2006)
  - Total: 161
- Time zone: UTC+3:30 (IRST)
  - Summer (DST): UTC+4:30 (IRDT)

Sabz Gaz-e Sofla (Persian: سبزگزسفلي, also Romanized as Sabz Gaz-e Soflá; also known as Sabz Gaz-e Pā’īn) is a village in Poshtkuh Rural District, in the Central District of Khash County, Sistan and Baluchestan Province, Iran. At the 2006 census, its population was 161, in 27 families.
