= Karvandar, Khash =

Village in Sistan and Baluchestan province, Iran

Karvandar Persian: کارواندر
- Village
- Location within Iran
- Coordinates: 27°50′08″N 60°46′07″E
- Country: Iran
- Province: Sistan and Baluchestan
- County: Khash
- District: Central
- Rural District: Karvandar

Population (2016)
  - Total: 335
- Time zone: UTC+3:30 (IRST)

Karvandar (Persian: کارواندر) is a village in, and the capital of, Karvandar Rural District of the Central District of Khash County, Sistan and Baluchestan province, Iran.

== Demographics ==
=== Population ===
At the time of the 2006 National Census, the village's population was 307 in 63 households. The following census in 2011 counted 245 people in 62 households. The 2016 census measured the population of the village as 335 people in 109 households.
