= Shahid Chamran, Sistan and Baluchestan =

Shahid Chamran شهيدچمران
- Village
- Country: Iran
- Province: Sistan and Baluchestan
- County: Khash
- Bakhsh: Central
- Rural District: Esmailabad

Population (2006)
  - Total: 71
- Time zone: UTC+3:30 (IRST)
  - Summer (DST): UTC+4:30 (IRDT)

Shahid Chamran (Persian: شهيدچمران, also Romanized as Shahīd Chamrān) is a village in Esmailabad Rural District, in the Central District of Khash County, Sistan and Baluchestan Province, Iran. At the 2006 census, its population was 71, in 20 families.
