= Sabz Gaz-e Vosta =

Sabz Gaz-e Vosta سبزگزوسطي
- Village
- Location within Iran
- Coordinates: 28°24′12″N 61°27′54″E
- Country: Iran
- Province: Sistan and Baluchestan
- County: Khash
- Bakhsh: Central
- Rural District: Poshtkuh

Population (2006)
  - Total: 354
- Time zone: UTC+3:30 (IRST)
  - Summer (DST): UTC+4:30 (IRDT)

Sabz Gaz-e Vosta (Persian: سبزگزوسطي, also Romanized as Sabz Gaz-e Vosţá; also known as Sabz Gaz) is a village in Poshtkuh Rural District, in the Central District of Khash County, Sistan and Baluchestan Province, Iran. At the 2006 census, its population was 354, in 60 families.
