= Abbasabad, Khash =

Village in Sistan and Baluchestan province, Iran

Abbasabad Persian: عباس‌آباد
- Village
- Location within Iran
- Coordinates: 28°17′06″N 61°09′26″E
- Country: Iran
- Province: Sistan and Baluchestan
- County: Khash
- District: Central
- Rural District: Esmailabad

Population (2016)
  - Total: 659
- Time zone: UTC+3:30 (IRST)

Abbasabad (Persian: عباس‌آباد) is a village in, and the capital of, Esmailabad Rural District of the Central District of Khash County, Sistan and Baluchestan province, Iran.

== Demographics ==
=== Population ===
At the time of the 2006 National Census, the village's population was 622 in 119 households. The following census in 2011 counted 357 people in 81 households. The 2016 census measured the population of the village as 659 people in 172 households.
