= Shahid Modarres =

Shahid Modarres شهيدمدرس
- Village
- Location within Iran
- Coordinates: 28°22′53″N 61°09′32″E
- Country: Iran
- Province: Sistan and Baluchestan
- County: Khash
- Bakhsh: Central
- Rural District: Esmailabad

Population (2006)
  - Total: 205
- Time zone: UTC+3:30 (IRST)
  - Summer (DST): UTC+4:30 (IRDT)

Shahid Modarres (Persian: شهيدمدرس, also Romanized as Shahīd Modarres) is a village in Esmailabad Rural District, in the Central District of Khash County, Sistan and Baluchestan Province, Iran. At the 2006 census, its population was 205, in 35 families.
