= Bilari Rural District =

Rural district in Sistan and Baluchestan province, Iran

Bilari Rural District Persian: دهستان بیلری
- Rural District
- Location within Iran
- Coordinates: 28°11′08″N 62°01′14″E
- Country: Iran
- Province: Sistan and Baluchestan
- County: Khash
- District: Poshtkuh
- Capital: Bilari
- Time zone: UTC+3:30 (IRST)

Bilari Rural District (Persian: دهستان بیلری) is in Poshtkuh District of Khash County, Sistan and Baluchestan province, Iran. Its capital is the village of Bilari, whose population at the time of the 2016 National Census was 411 people in 112 households.

== History ==
In 2019, Poshtkuh Rural District was separated from the Central District in the formation of Poshtkuh District, and Bilari Rural District was created in the new district.
