= Shahrak-e Dorudi =

Village in Sistan and Baluchestan province, Iran

Shahrak-e Dorudi Persian: شهرك درودي
- Village
- Location within Iran
- Coordinates: 28°31′49″N 61°21′35″E
- Country: Iran
- Province: Sistan and Baluchestan
- County: Khash
- District: Central
- Rural District: Sangan

Population (2016)
  - Total: 528
- Time zone: UTC+3:30 (IRST)

Shahrak-e Dorudi (Persian: شهرك درودي) is a village in Sangan Rural District of the Central District of Khash County, Sistan and Baluchestan province, Iran.

== Demographics ==
=== Population ===
At the time of the 2006 National Census, the village's population was 320 in 90 households. The following census in 2011 counted 241 people in 47 households. The 2016 census measured the population of the village as 528 people in 126 households. It was the most populous village in its rural district.
