= Himan Shahabi =

Himan Shahabi (Persian: هیمن شهابی) is a professor of Natural resources at the University of Kurdistan (Iran).

Himan Shahabi is an expert in Remote Sensing (RS) and Geographic Information Systems (GIS) who has worked in applied geospatial technologies. His work spans advanced GIS modeling and remote sensing methodologies, with a strong focus on natural hazard assessment. Shahabi currently serves as a professor of geoscience—specializing in RS and GIS—at the Faculty of Natural Resources, University of Kurdistan in Iran. He has also broadened his international academic experience through a one-year professorship at the Institute of Physics, Division of Geochronology and Environmental Isotopes at the Silesian University of Technology in Gliwice, Poland.

== Selected publication ==
- Khosravi, Khabat; Pham, Binh Thai; Chapi, Kamran; Shirzadi, Ataollah; Shahabi, Himan; Revhaug, Inge; Prakash, Indra; Tien Bui, Dieu (2018-06-15). "A comparative assessment of decision trees algorithms for flash flood susceptibility modeling at Haraz watershed, northern Iran". Science of the Total Environment. 627: 744–755. doi:10.1016/j.scitotenv.2018.01.266. ISSN 0048-9697.
