= Judin =

Judin may refer to one of the following places:

- Judin, Iran, a hamlet in Iran's Sistan province
- Judin castle, a Crusader-era castle in northern Israel.
