= KUG =

KUG may refer to:

- Kiso Survey for Ultraviolet-excess Galaxies, an astronomical catalog
- Kubin Airport, Queensland, Australia
- Kug, a village in Sistan and Baluchestan Province, Iran
- University of Music and Performing Arts, Graz (Kunstuniversität Graz), Austria
- Gesetz betreffend das Urheberrecht an Werken der bildenden Künste und der Photographie or KunstUrhG, a German law protecting personality rights

== See also ==
- KUGS, a college radio station in Bellingham, Washington
