= Darudi =

Darudi or Darvadi (Persian: درودي) may refer to:

- Darudi, Sistan and Baluchestan
- Darudi, South Khorasan
