= Muzin =

Muzin may refer to:

- Muzin, Iran, or Muzan, a village in Sistan and Baluchestan province
- Nicolas Muzin (born 1975), Canadian-American Republican political strategist, attorney and physician
- Muzin, member of the South Korean boy band BAE173
