= Killing of Khodanur Lojei =

Baluch Iranian protester killed by security forces in 2022

Khodanur Lojei
- خدانور لجه‌ای
- Born: 2 October 1995; Zahedan, Sistan and Baluchestan Province, Iran
- Died: 2 October 2022 (aged 27); Zahedan, Sistan and Baluchestan Province, Iran
- Other name: Khodanur Lajai
- Known for: His death during the 2022 Zahedan massacre

Khodanur Lojei or Lajai (Persian: خدانور لجه‌ای; 2 October 1995 – 2 October 2022) was an Iranian protester from Zahedan, who was killed during the 2022 Zahedan massacre, one of the Mahsa Amini protests. A picture of him with his hands tied to a flagpole with a bottle of water put in front of him (but out of his reach) has become one of the symbols of the ongoing protests Iran.

== History ==
Lojei died on 2 October 2022, from a gunshot in his kidney, during a time of mass protests in Iran. There is a viral photo released of a man tied to a flagpole, being tortured by the Islamic Republic because the water bottle is out of reach.

The Islamic Republic News Agency (IRNA) and other Iranian news outlets reported that the man on the pole was Lajahi who was an incarcerated Afghani thief and criminal. They also claim his real name is Sadegh Kebadani. Some Iranian news agencies such as Mashregh News have claimed the image of the man tied to the flag pole is possibly Baloch singer, Bilal Nasravi.

BBC Persian and other news agencies have reported Lojei was a protester that died during the 2022 Zahedan massacre, tied to the pole. Lojei was Baloch and of the Sunni religion, which are two minority groups. The photo of him tied to the flagpole documented the government injustices, which amplified the public outcry. As a result he has become a symbol in-part because of ethnic discrimination and class inequality within Iran.

== Impact ==
In November 2022, cities across Iran gathered in protests and in strikes as a response to the 2022 Zahedan massacre and the death of Lojei, whose name was one that was chanted during the Tehran events. The cities that saw these national protests included Tehran, Tabriz, Mahabad, Bukan, Saqqez, Baneh.

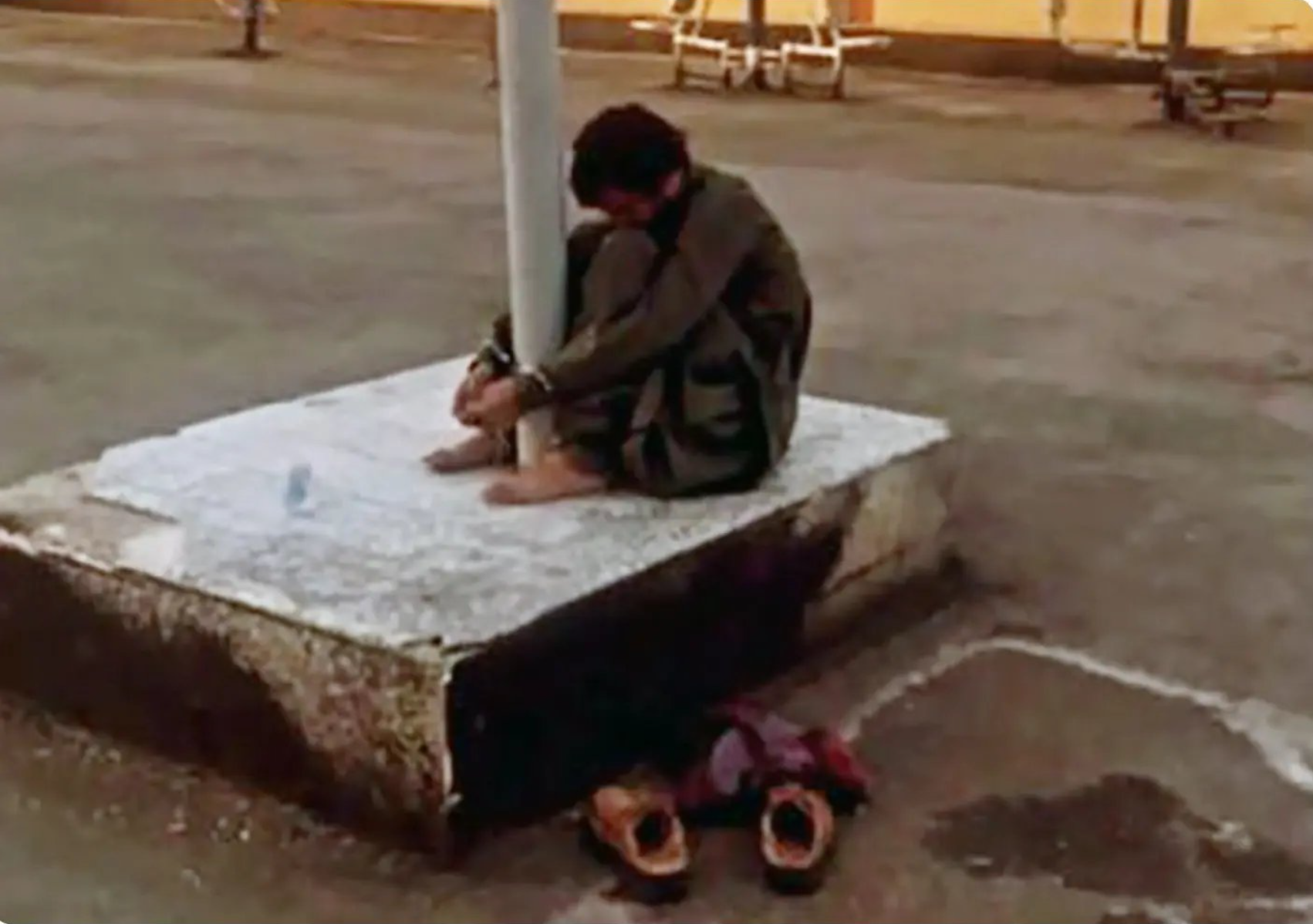
Khodanour Lejuei tied to flagpole.

In Sanandaj, at the University of Kurdistan a large group of student protesters staged a recreation of Lojei on the pole, before they were attacked by the Islamic Republic troops, using performance as a form of protest and mourning. At the Los Angeles County Museum of Art (LACMA), mass protesters were led in a performance by Mediseh Bathaie, where they were tied to the lamp posts in Chris Burden’s art installation Urban Light (2008) to honor the 40th day since Lojei's death. It is customary in Shia Islam to mark the 40th day of mourning.

In Berlin, protesters dressed in traditional Baloch clothing to honor Lojei's memory during the ongoing solidarity protests. International events happened in Bangalore, Amherst, and Los Angeles, where a protester(s) have locked themself to a pole following Lojei's death. Additionally images of Lojei's face have been used on protest posters.

In Chicago, artists created a tribute sculpture for Lojei made from ice displayed at the Art Institute of Chicago.

In 2023, Israeli artist Benzi Brofman created a mural in Nazareth of support for the Iranian protesters, which included illustrations of 15 victims including Khodanur Lojei.
