= Gurchan =

Gurchan (Persian: گورچان) may refer to:

- Gurchan, Markazi
- Gurchan, Sistan and Baluchestan
