= Bid Kaneh explosion =

2011 explosion in Tehran, Iran

- Location: 35°37′28″N 50°52′21″E

Explosion location on the map of Iran

On 12 November 2011 at about 13:30 local time, a large explosion occurred at the Modarres garrison missile base in Tehran Province, Iran. The facility is also referred to as Shahid Modarres missile base, and the Alghadir missile base. Seventeen members of the Revolutionary Guards were killed in this incident, including Major General Hassan Moqaddam, described as "a key figure in Iran's missile programme".

The Iranian Revolutionary Guard garrison is located near Shahriar, Tehran Province, about 30 miles west of Iran's capital of Tehran. Residents of Karaj heard the sound of the explosion and breaking glass in buildings that were near the scene. Initial reports indicated that the explosion happened at a CNG station, but this was later denied. Revolutionary Guard officials stated the accident occurred while military personnel were transporting munitions. Officials denied the possibility of any foreign sabotage in the explosion despite the "fivefold increase in explosions" since 2010 at Iranian refineries and gas pipelines reported by industry experts.

According to CNN, senior defense officials indicated that the United States believed the explosion was an industrial accident which took place while mixing volatile fuel for a large ballistic missile. Commercial satellite imagery captured on November 22 showed extensive damage at the military base and some buildings appeared to have been completely destroyed.

== Possible Israeli sabotage ==
According to an unnamed Western official quoted by Time magazine, the blast was no accident and there are "more bullets in the magazine", implying the explosion was deliberate. Israeli Defense Minister Ehud Barak was asked about the explosion and replied, "May there be more like it."

== See also ==
- Iran–Israel proxy conflict
