= Esmailabad, Khash =

City in Sistan and Baluchestan province, Iran

Esmailabad Persian: اسماعیل‌آباد
- City
- Location within Iran
- Coordinates: 28°18′27″N 61°08′14″E
- Country: Iran
- Province: Sistan and Baluchestan
- County: Khash
- District: Central

Population (2016)
  - Total: 4,868
- Time zone: UTC+3:30 (IRST)

Esmailabad (Persian: اسماعیل‌آباد) is a city in the Central District of Khash County, Sistan and Baluchestan province, Iran. As a village, it served as capital of Sangan Rural District until its capital was transferred to the village of Sangan.

== Demographics ==
=== Population ===
At the time of the 2006 National Census, Esmailabad's population was 2,503 in 497 households, when it was a village in Esmailabad Rural District. The following census in 2011 counted 2,863 people in 643 households. The 2016 census measured the population of the village as 4,868 people in 1,193 households. It was the most populous village in its rural district.

Esmailabad was elevated to the status of a city in 2019.
