= Chamran =

Chamran (Persian: چمران) may refer to:

People

- Mostafa Chamran, Iranian physicist and politician
- Mehdi Chamran, Iranian architect and politician

Places

- Chamran, Iran, a city in Khuzestan Province, Iran
- Chamran, Behbahan, a village in Khuzestan Province, Iran
- Chamran, Markazi, a village in Markazi Province, Iran
- Chamran Expressway in Tehran, Iran
- Chamran Grand Hotel, in Shiraz, Iran
- Chamran University of Ahvaz, in Ahvaz, Iran

== See also ==
- Shahid Chamran (disambiguation)
