= 2022 Khash massacre =

Khash

- Part of Mahsa Amini protests
Date	4 November 2022
Location	Khash, Iran
Result	Violent crackdown on protesters

Belligerents
Iranian security forces	Protestors

Casualties and losses
0 killed, 0 injured	18 killed, 20+ injured

The Khash massacre, also known as Khash Bloody Friday (Note: Persian: جمعه خونین خاش, Balochi: واشءِ ھۏنݔں آدݔنگ) refers to the clashes between the protesting people of Khash and the police forces of the Islamic Republic of Iran on 4 November 2022, which started with slogans and gathering in the streets and throwing stones in front of the governorate of Khash, and then they were directly targeted by security forces' war bullets and led to many casualties.

Amnesty International (AI) reported that the death toll was 18 and that security forces used "lethal war bullets" in suppressing the people.

The clashes were in response to the alleged rape of a 15-year-old Baloch girl in June by Colonel Ebrahim Kuchakzai, the commander of the Chabahar police force, and the Zahedan massacre on 30 September, which left 96 dead and 300 injured, fueling the anger of the people of Khash.

== Background ==
The main cause and background of the alleged prior incidence of rape by police Colonel Ebrahim Kouchakzai in Chabahar during an interview with a 15-year-old girl because of the incidence of a murder case in a nearby house. The colonel told the girl he had to "inspect her body" and then proceeded to molest and rape the girl, who later informed her mother of this, causing much anger.

These clashes occurred after the 30 September incident, and the Zahedan massacre intensified protests in Khash.

== Massacre and casualties ==
The protests in Khash started after the Friday prayer ceremony on 4 November 2022, and the protesters in this city gathered in the streets and chanted slogans against the Islamic Republic. They started throwing stones into the governor's office, which were directly targeted by war bullets. Iranian government officials, including Governor Khashsahebgol Salehi, stated that the protesters intended to seize the governor's building with armed attacks and the Ministry of Agricultural Jihad office of Khash city was completely burned down. Protesters also set fire to the chain store and police kiosk. According to him, 12 vehicles were burned in the city of Khash.

Abdolhamid Ismaeelzahi, the Friday prayer leader of Zahedan, announced in a statement that at least 16 people were killed and dozens more were injured in the incident. Ismaeelzahi called the statements of the Islamic Republic officials about the "armed attack by the people of Khash on the governor's building" was "a complete lie". Amnesty International (AI) reported that the death toll was 18 and that security forces used "lethal war bullets" in suppressing the people.

== Reactions ==
Moinuddin Saeedi, a representative of Chabahar in the 11th term of the Islamic Consultative Assembly, addressed the massacre in a statement in the open court of the parliament, saying that no official had apologized for incidents so far, and questioned why protesters in the Sistan-Baluchestan province were treated in a different manner then elsewhere in the country, and that plastic bullets were used in other parts of the country, but live ammunition was used in Balochistan. His speech was interrupted and left unfinished.

== Aftermath ==
On Saturday, 5 November, all schools in Khash County, at all levels, were closed in two shifts, morning and afternoon, and it was announced that classes would be held in absentia.

On February 3, according to social media reports, the gathering of Baloch worshippers and protesters continued despite the security situation in Zahedan and Khash.

== See also ==
- 2022 Zahedan massacre
- 2025 Gunich Village raid in Khash
- Anti-Sunnism
