= Khash, Iran =

City in Sistan and Baluchestan province, Iran

Khash Persian: خاش
- City
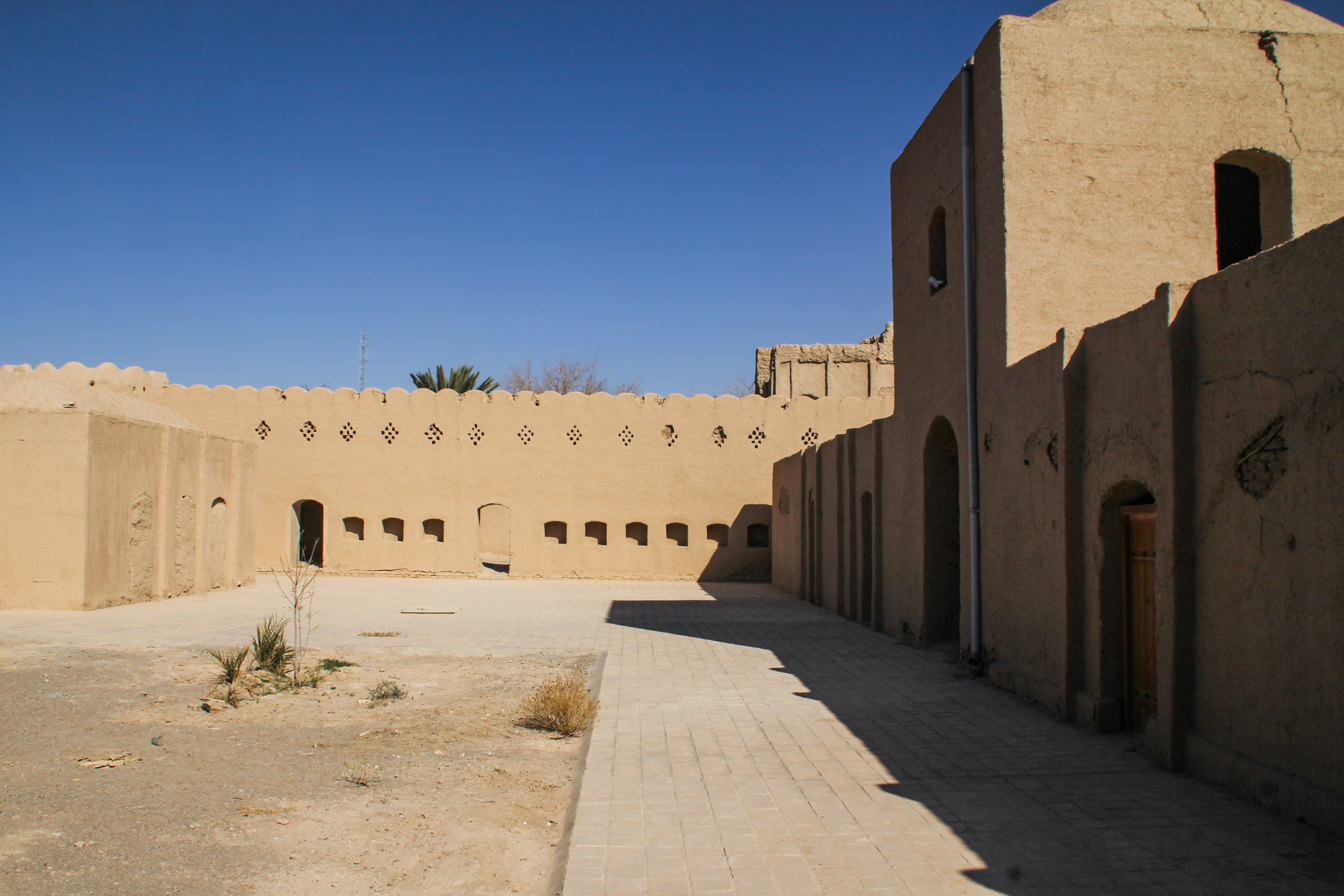
- Haiderabad Castle in Khsh

- Location within Iran
- Coordinates: 28°13′12″N 61°12′41″E
- Country: Iran
- Province: Sistan and Baluchestan
- County: Khash
- District: Central

Population (2016)
  - Total: 56,584
- Time zone: UTC+3:30 (IRST)

Khash (Persian: خاش) (Note: Also romanized as Khāsh and Xāŝ; also known as Kavash, Kwāsh, and Vāsht) is a city in the Central District of Khash County, Sistan and Baluchestan province, Iran, serving as capital of both the county and the district.

== History ==
Today's Khash is located near the old city of Khash, which dates back to the reign of Nader Shah. During the Sasanian era, an area called Washt was mentioned in modern Baluchistan in the area of Khash, which shows that the history of this city goes back to the ancient times and the old city of Khash dates back to the pre-Islamic era.

In the past, Khash was the military (and political) center of the region, and from 1307 to 1320, the province were under control of military rulers. All the governors and prefects were military, that's why many important offices were located in Khash, and Zahedan was nominally the central seat of government and the capital of Sistan and Baluchistan province from 1310 onwards, but Khash was officially more important.

== Demographics ==
=== Language, ethnicity, and religion ===
The overwhelming majority of the city's inhabitants are ethnic Baloch who speak the Balochi language, and Persians who speak a variant of the Persian language known as Sistani or Seistani.

The people of Khash speak Balochi (Sarhadi and Makrani) and the Persian language. 95% of the population of this city are Sunnis and 5% are Shias.

=== Population ===
At the time of the 2006 National Census, the city's population was 56,683 in 10,176 households. The following census in 2011 counted 54,105 people in 11,721 households. The 2016 census measured the population of the city as 56,584 people in 14,384 households.

== Geography ==
=== Overview ===
Khash city is known by most of the people for the 288th Armored Brigade of Suleiman Hashemzehi Nezaja and the 08 Ibrahim Nouri Nezaja Training Center and the semi-active mountain of Taftan. Khash is a city of Baloch people located in the center of Balochistan with a cold and mountainous climate.

=== Earthquakes ===
On 16 April 2013, an earthquake of magnitude 7.8 struck the Iran-Pakistan border near Balochistan. The epicenter of the earthquake was at Khash.

=== Climate ===
Khash has a hot desert climate (BWh) according to the Köppen climate classification.

Climate data for Khash(1986-2010 normals), elevation: 1,394.0 m (4,573.5 ft)
Month	Jan	Feb	Mar	Apr	May	Jun	Jul	Aug	Sep	Oct	Nov	Dec	Year
Daily mean °C (°F)	8.5 (47.3)	11.3 (52.3)	15.3 (59.5)	20.9 (69.6)	26.1 (79.0)	29.3 (84.7)	30.3 (86.5)	28.7 (83.7)	25.0 (77.0)	20.2 (68.4)	14.6 (58.3)	10.5 (50.9)	20.1 (68.1)
Average precipitation mm (inches)	37.8 (1.49)	32.9 (1.30)	32.3 (1.27)	6.5 (0.26)	2.7 (0.11)	3.5 (0.14)	1.8 (0.07)	1.2 (0.05)	0.6 (0.02)	1.8 (0.07)	3.7 (0.15)	26.2 (1.03)	151 (5.96)
Average relative humidity (%)	48	44	38	27	21	18	20	18	18	23	32	43	29
Source: Iran Meteorological Organization (temperatures), (humidity), (precipitation)

== Culture ==
=== Music ===
The life of the Baloch people is a mix of ideas and beliefs that have roots in their ancient traditions. It is rare to see a ceremony or ritual that is not accompanied by music. In local music, songs such as Nazink are used in wedding ceremonies and the Naat song that praises the Holy Prophet of Islam. Some of these ceremonies and rituals are:

Liko and Zahiruk: are songs that are sung at the death or separation of relatives. Zahiruk is recited by women during their daily activities. Today, Liko and Zahiruk (Mudeg/Motek) are performed by men and accompanied by Qichak (Serud/Seroz).

=== Poetry ===
It is a song whose theme is epic stories, literature, love stories, historical events, and advice. Like the conflict of the Baloch people with the British forces, Jind Khan and the story of Mirqanbar, Chaker and Gohram.

=== Clothing ===
In Khash city, men's clothing consists of a long shirt with an open collar, loose pants, a dastar (lang) and a vest (basket), and sometimes it is a hat. Women's clothing is also a long shirt with needlework in the cuffs, pockets (gaptan), and tail. The legs and chest are decorated.

== Economy and infrastructure ==
=== Infrastructure ===
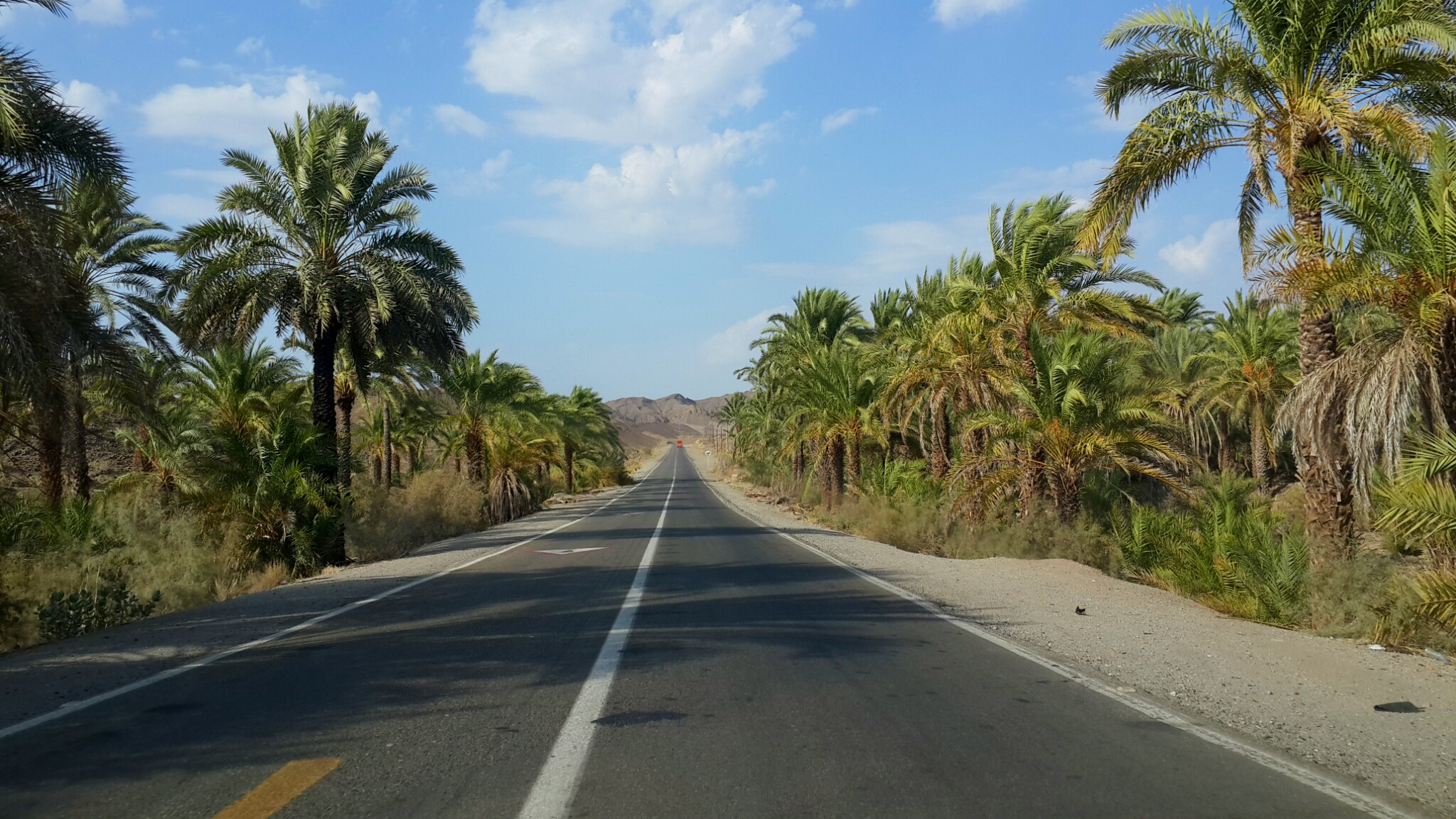
Iranshahr to Khash city road

The city of Khash was located in the middle of the Iranshahr-Zahedan road. historically, due to the strategic location of the city in the middle of the province, it was the center of the political administration of Iran's Balochistan in the west. The city of Khash is located on the route of the desalinated sea water pipeline from Arabian sea to the east of Iran, which supplies the water needed by industries. Also, the drinking water of the city is supplied through Karvander dam.

=== Industries ===
The people of the city are mainly engaged in the food industry, agriculture in the surrounding areas, mining (especially cement and iron ore) and handicrafts, and trade with Pakistan (and fuel smuggling).

Khash handicrafts show the peak of art, elegance and culture of Khash people. Among the handicrafts of Khash people are needlework, mat weaving, carpet weaving, back and khurjin weaving, coin and mirror embroidery, curtain weaving, goldsmithing, black curtain weaving, financial felt, inlay work, woven fabric, jewelry making, cream, Perivar embroidery, production of musical instruments and making wall hangings are the main handicraft arts in Khash city.

== Health ==
Khash is the point of origin for the abnormally high incidence of Factor XIII deficiency, an extremely serious genetic bleeding disorder in Iran; it is more than 100 times more prevalent in Iran than anywhere else due to the high degree of consanguineous marriage.

== Public services ==
In the city of Khash, there is a well-equipped Imam Khomeini hospital, several specialized medical clinics, courts, numerous centers of the police and other law enforcement, security and military forces, a large number of small mosques, as well as the Jame (Grand) Mosque of Khash.

== Education ==
Khash Islamic Azad University is located in Khash city.

Also, Khash Faculty of Industry and Mining is located in Khash city, which is a branch of Sistan and Baluchistan University. This faculty started its activity in 2013 with the training of mining engineering, computer engineering and industrial engineering, and its purpose is to train expert staff for the industrial and mining development of Khash region.

== Tourist attractions ==
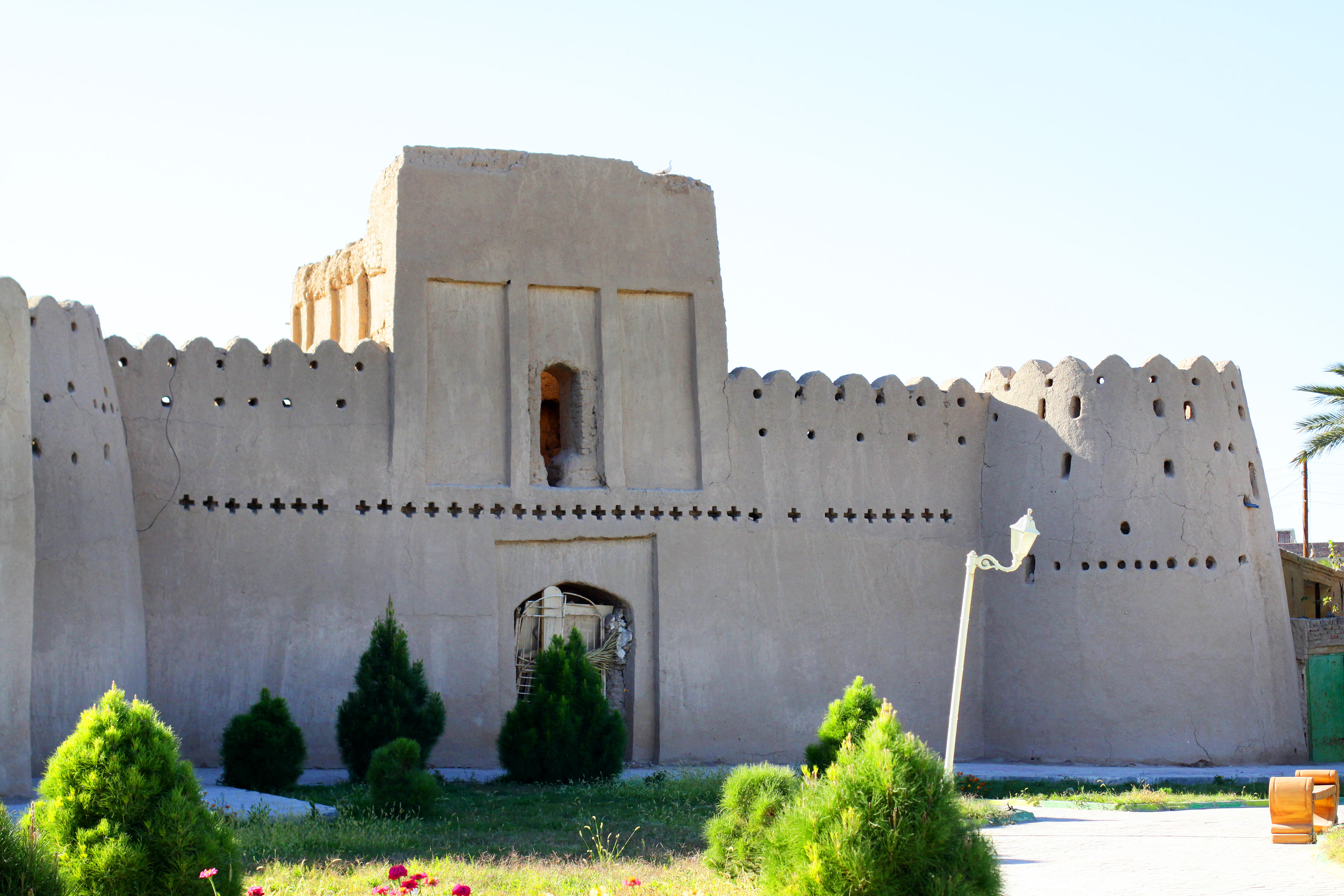
Heydar Abad Castle in Khash city

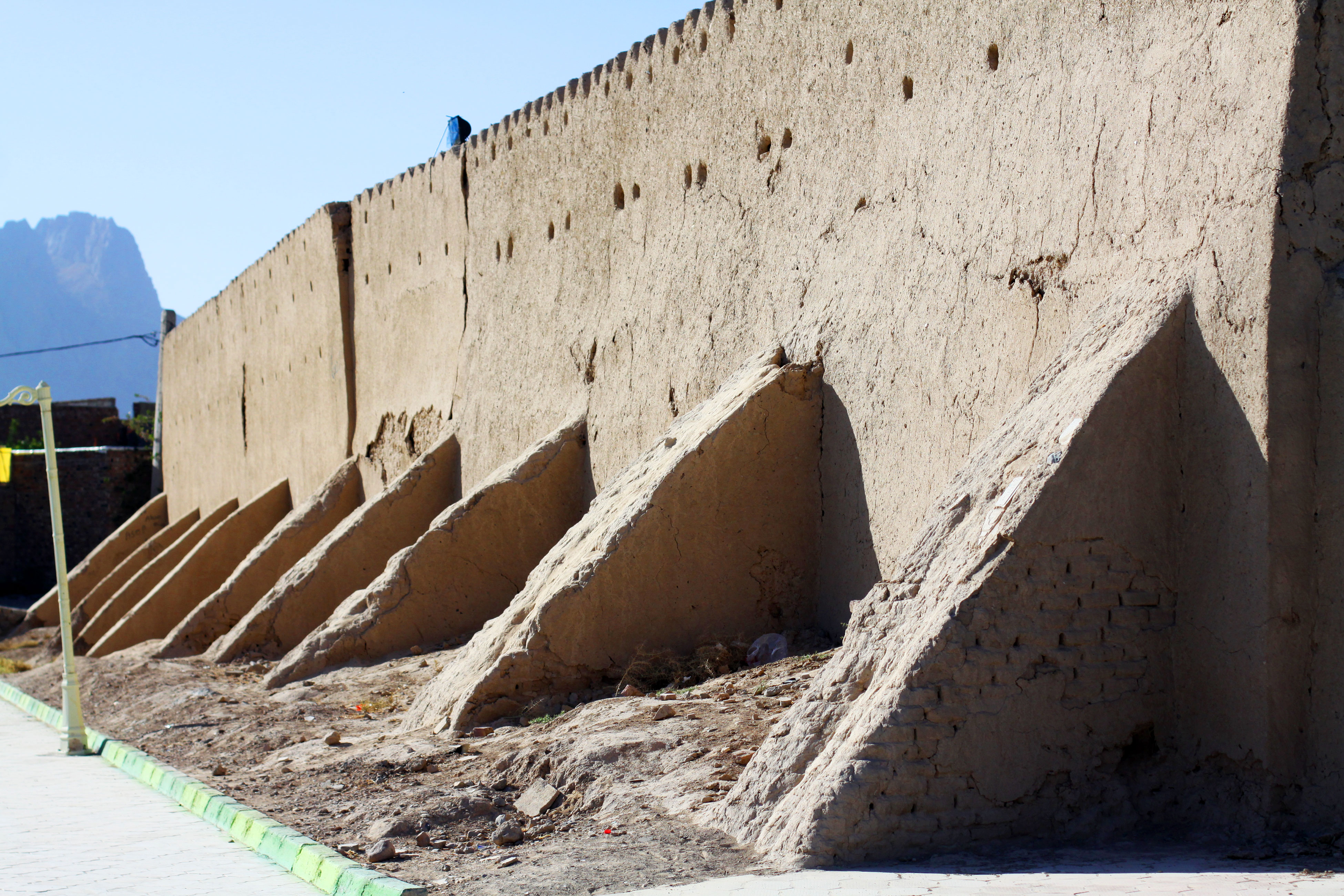
Heydar Abad Castle

- Khash handicrafts
- The sleeping king mountain
- Hyderabad Fort
- Anjir Mehi
- Amin's treasure
- Naseri Khash Castle
- Nakhlestan Irandag
- Irandang River
- Sadaki Cave of Irendag
- Irendan Castle (Ten Castles
- Mount Taftan
- Karvander River
- Mount Birk
- Merentak River
- Sangan village

== See also ==
- 2022 Khash massacre
- Bloody Raid on Gunich Village in Khash
