= Tang-e Sheykh =

Tang-e Sheykh تنگ شيخ
- Village
- Location within Iran
- Coordinates: 30°35′50″N 50°27′47″E
- Country: Iran
- Province: Khuzestan
- County: Behbahan
- Bakhsh: Central
- Rural District: Howmeh

Population (2006)
  - Total: 157
- Time zone: UTC+3:30 (IRST)
  - Summer (DST): UTC+4:30 (IRDT)

Tang-e Sheykh (Persian: تنگ شيخ; also known as Chamrān and Chamrānābād) is a village in Howmeh Rural District, in the Central District of Behbahan County, Khuzestan Province, Iran. At the 2006 census, its population was 157, in 28 families.
