= 2022 Zahedan massacre =

Killings by state security forces in Iran

- Part of Mahsa Amini protests
Date	30 September 2022
Location	Zahedan, Sistan and Baluchestan province, Iran
Result	Violent crackdown on protesters, hundreds of protestors killed and injured Suspension of schools Heavy protests continued every Friday

Belligerents
Iranian security forces	Protestors of the Death of Mahsa Amini

Casualties and losses
4 killed	96 killed, 300+ injured

The Zahedan massacre, also known as Bloody Friday (Persian: جمعه خونین, romanized: Jom'e-ye Xunin)(Balochi: زائدانءِ ھۏنݔن آدݔنَگ),⁣ was a series of violent crackdowns starting with protesters gathering and chanting in front of a police station near the Great Mosalla of Zahedan, Iran, on 30 September 2022 leading to many casualties.

Security forces opened fire on protesters, violently cracked down on protesters in Zahedan, and later opened fire on worshipers holding the Friday Prayers in the Jameh Mosque of Makki, leading to street clashes resulting in at least 96 protesters killed and 300 injured.

The clashes were mainly in response to the alleged rape of a 15-year-old Baloch girl in June by Colonel Ebrahim Kouchakzai, the commander of the police force in Chabahar, and the 16 September 2022 death of Mahsa Amini following her arrest by the Guidance Patrol.

Schools in Zahedan and Nosratabad were shut down temporarily due to concerns for the welfare of schoolchildren.

== Background ==
The main cause of the incident was the death of the Iranian woman Mahsa Amini, and an alleged prior incidence of rape by Colonel Ebrahim Kouchakzai in Chabahar during an interview with a 15-year-old girl because of the incidence of a murder case in a nearby house. The colonel told the girl he had to "inspect her body" and then proceeded to molest and rape the girl, who later informed her mother of this, causing much anger.

== Findings ==
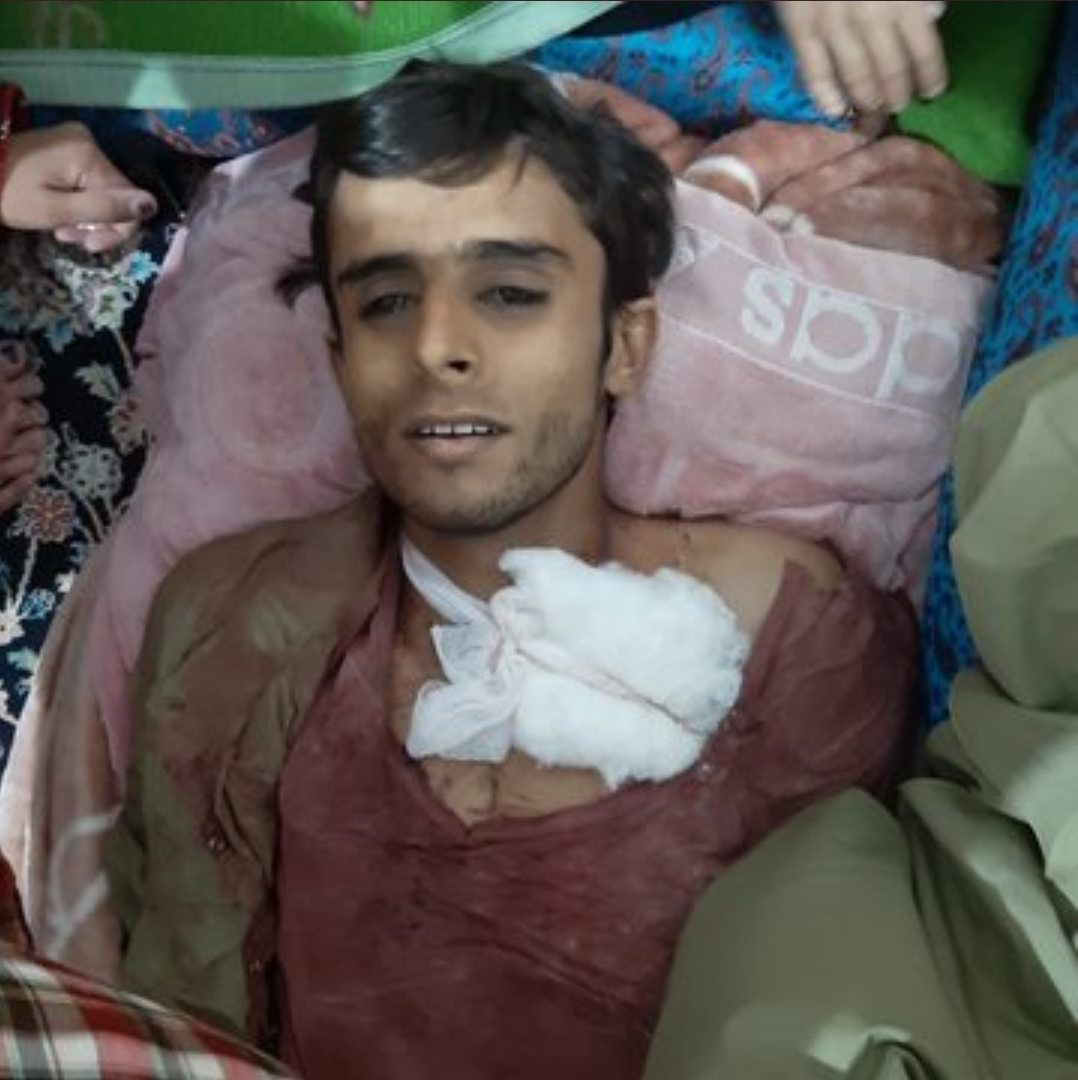
Mohammad Iqbal Naibzahi who was killed on Bloody Friday of Zahedan

A 6 October 2022 Amnesty International report found that on 30 September government forces had "unlawfully fired live ammunition, metal pellets and teargas" directly into the vicinity of the Great Mosalla of Zahedan prayer site, a large prayer site across the road from the police station, "where hundreds of people, including children and older people, were still performing Friday prayers." Amnesty International acknowledged "a minority of protesters throwing stones towards the police station", but found no evidence that "would justify the use of lethal force". Amnesty International further stated that "many victims killed (were) facing away from the security forces and posed no imminent threat". The report stated there were 66 deaths accounted for so far, plus an unknown number of additional victims.

Baloch Activists' Campaign first put the number of those killed during the protests at 42 and those injured at 197, Of those, 160 people were injured by live ammunition and the rest by shotgun fire, later putting the number at a higher figure of at least 96 killed (including 13 children) and more than 300 injured, adding that most injured are in critical condition and that the real figure is probably much higher.

== Court martial ==
Iranian armed forces launched a private hearing April 2023.

== Reactions ==
Molavi Abdolhamid Ismaeelzahi called the incident a "catastrophe" and demanded "trial and punishment for those responsible for those who have killed people", adding that worshipers were shot in head and heart by snipers. Later on, he commented on the Iranian government's claim that the killings were perpetrated by separatist terrorist organizations such as Jaish ul Adl, saying that "neither Jaish ul Adl nor any other such organization have had no involvement in this matter".

Reza Pahlavi wrote in a tweet that the killings will "only expedite the regime's demise".

The hashtag #Speak4Zahedan was popularized on Twitter by Baloch activists. From this event, a picture of Khodanur Lojei, a Baloch protester whose hands were tied to a flagpole, with a cup of water put in front of him (but out of his reach) became a symbol in the ongoing protests.

== See also ==
- 2022 Khash massacre
- Black Friday (1978)
- Mahshahr massacre
