= Khashan =

Khashan خشان
- Village
- Location within Iran
- Coordinates: 32°03′37″N 48°15′42″E
- Country: Iran
- Province: Khuzestan
- County: Shush
- Bakhsh: Central
- Rural District: Hoseynabad

Population (2006)
  - Total: 768
- Time zone: UTC+3:30 (IRST)
  - Summer (DST): UTC+4:30 (IRDT)

Khashan (Persian: خشان, also Romanized as Khashān; also known as Shahīd Chamrān and Shahīd Doktor Chamrān) is a village in Hoseynabad Rural District, in the Central District of Shush County, Khuzestan Province, Iran. At the 2006 census, its population was 768, in 100 families.
