= University of Kurdistan (Iran) =

University in Iran

Coordinates: 35°16′42″N 46°59′38″E

- دانشگاه كردستان
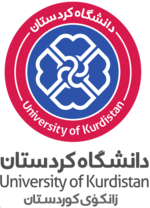
- Type: Public
- Established: 1991
- President: Adel Siosemardeh
- Academic staff: 400+
- Students: 11000+
- Location: Sanandaj, Kurdistan Province, Iran
- Campus: Urban
- Website: www.uok.ac.ir

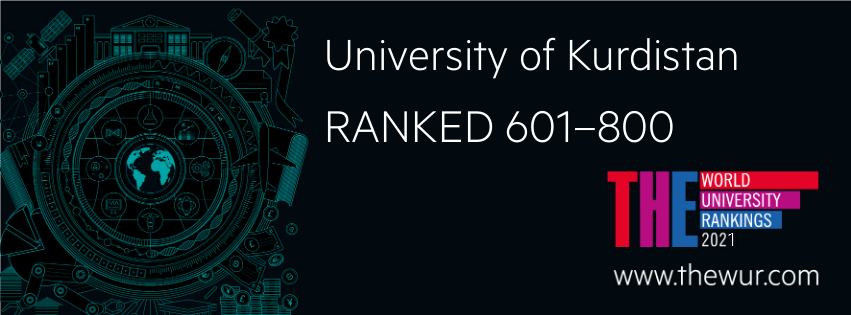

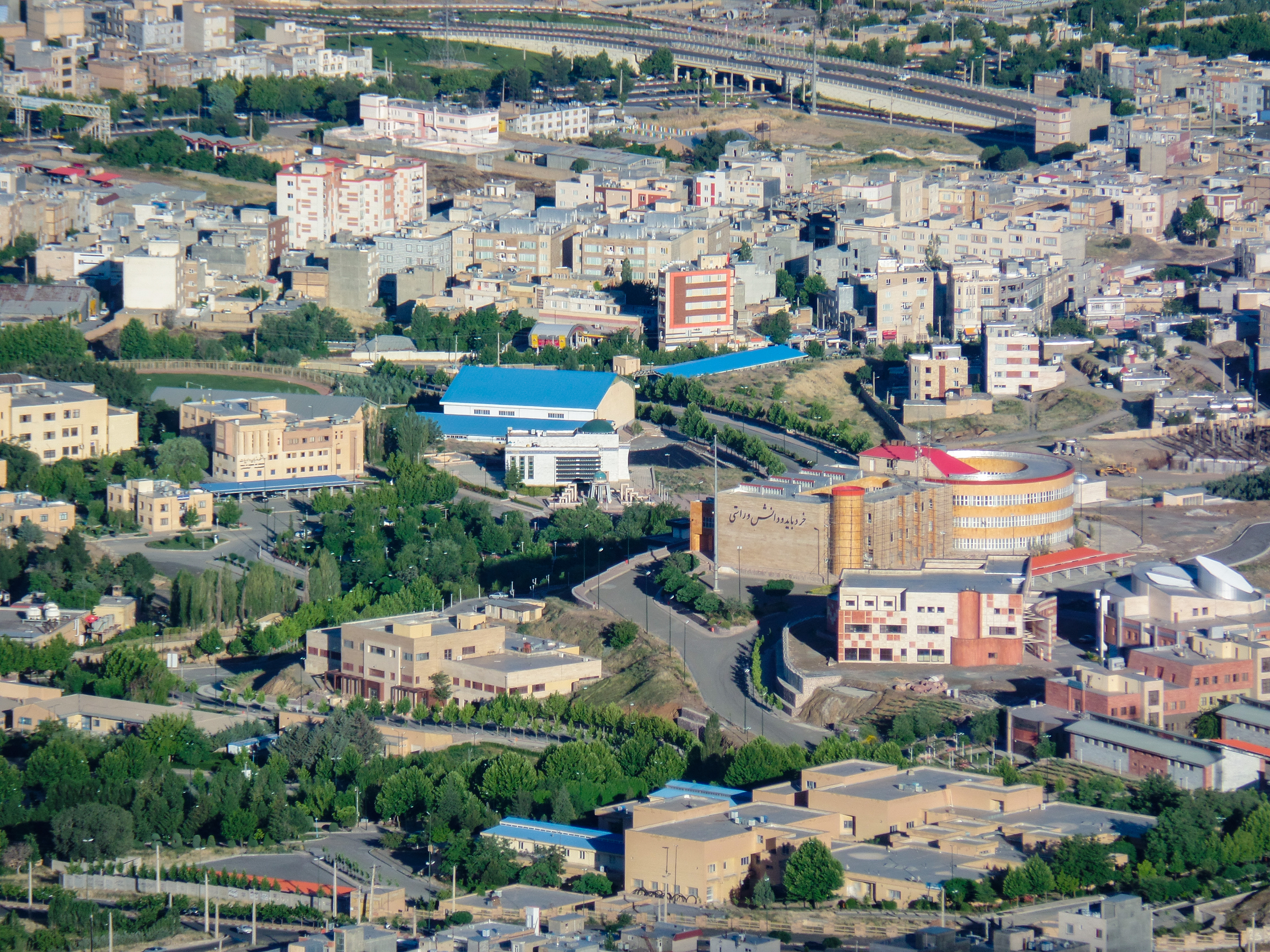
University panorama

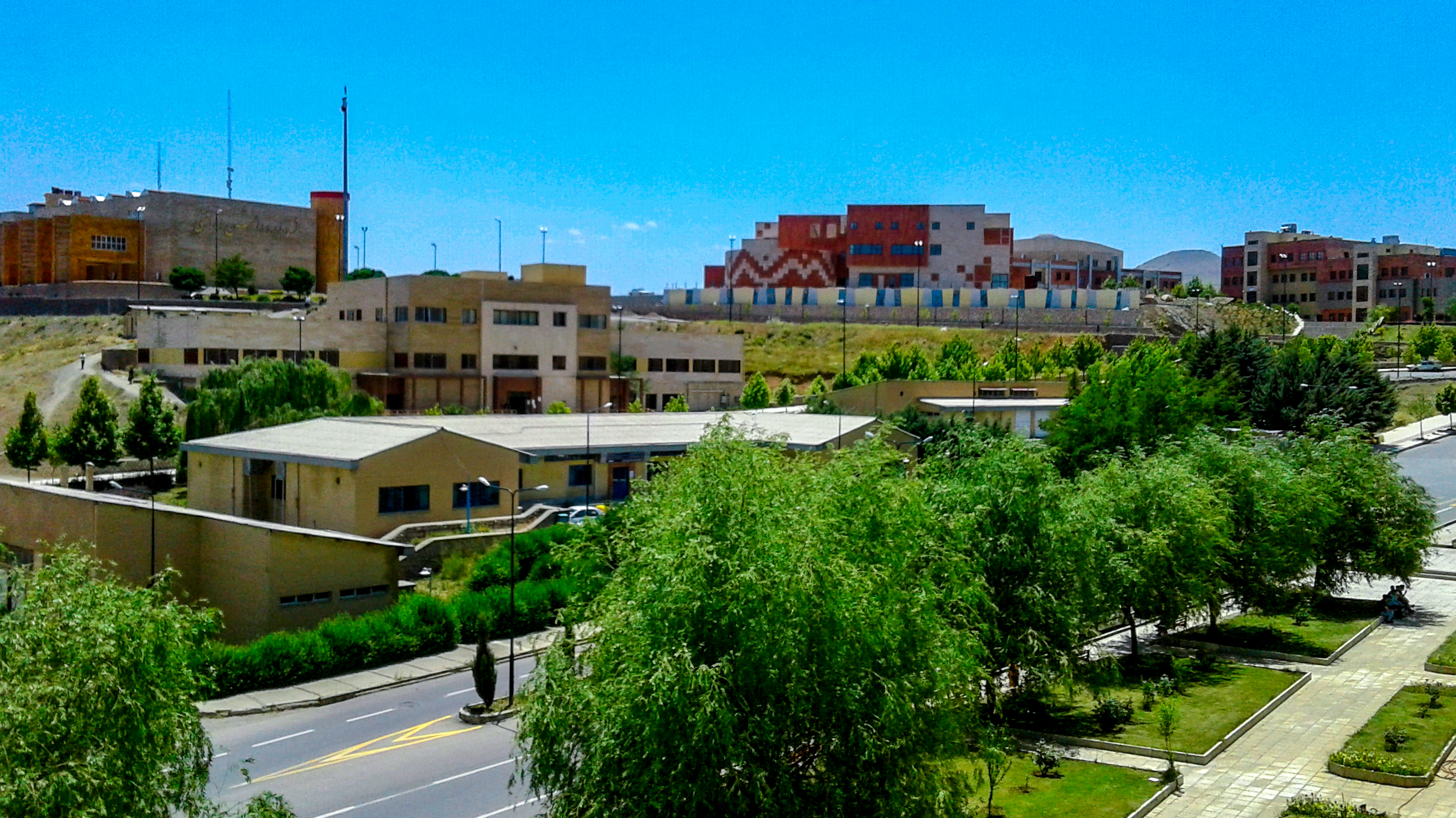
Campus

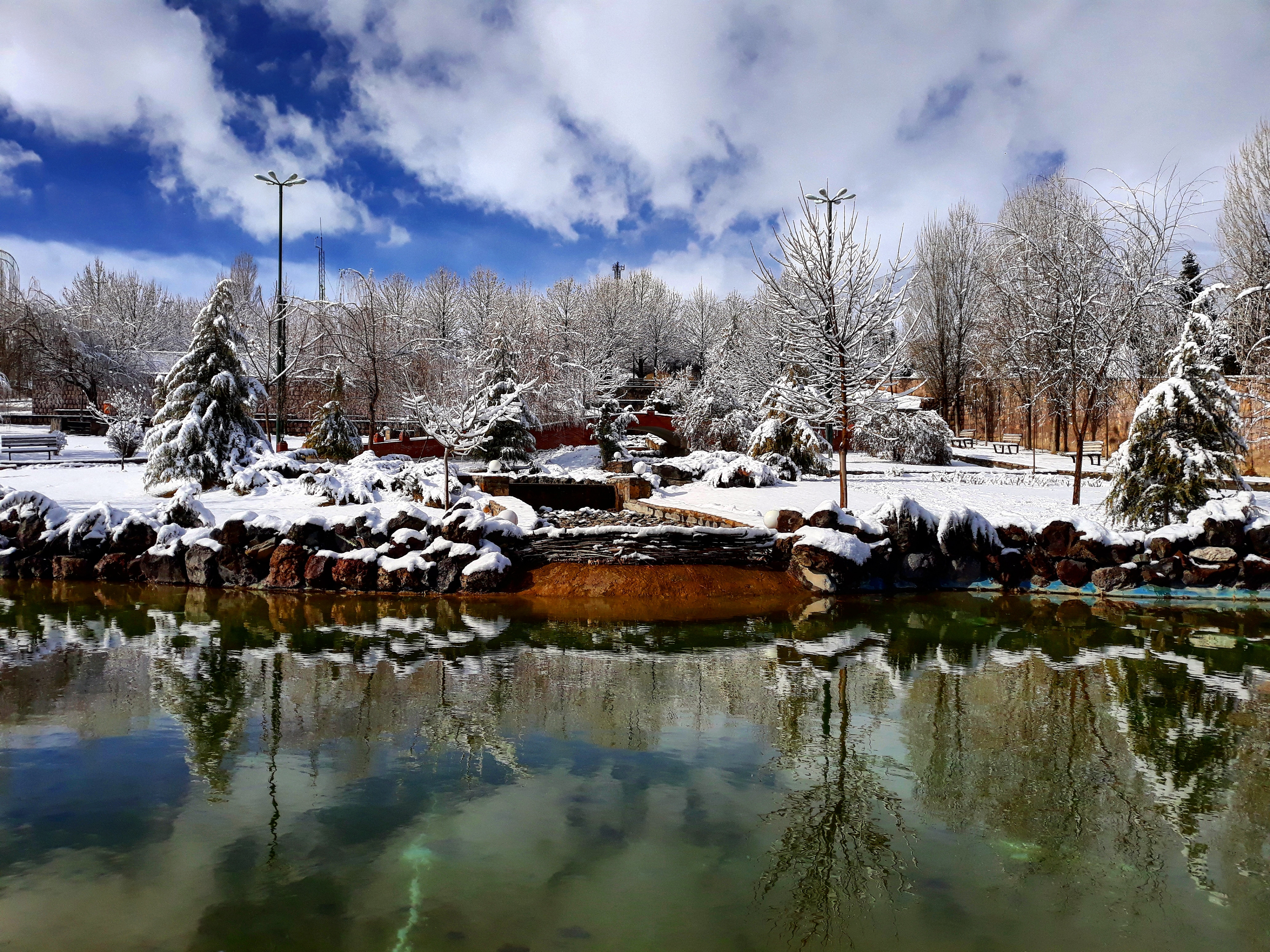
Campus

University of Kurdistan (Persian: دانشگاه كردستان; Dâneshgâh-e Kordestân) is the largest university in Iranian Kurdistan Province, located in the south of Sanandaj. The University of Kurdistan was ranked as the eighth top university in Iran (categorized by quantity and quality of research activities) in academic year 2007-2008 and was ranked as the first top developing university in Iran in academic year 2006–2007.

== Overview of UOK ==
The University of Kurdistan (UOK) commenced its activities as the Higher College of Sanandaj, an affiliate of Tarbiat Moallem (Teacher Training Institute), Tehran in the academic year 1974–1975. Its first intake of students was in the field of Mathematics Teacher Training. In the following academic year, the college became an off campus faculty of Kermanshah's Razi University and was thereafter named the Sanandaj Faculty of Teacher Training. In addition to admitting students in Mathematics Teacher Training, it began to accept students in Chemistry and English. By expanding its pedagogical activities and conducting research in a wide variety of fields, this teacher training unit was granted university status by the Ministry of Higher Education and Culture in 1991. Henceforth it became known as the University of Kurdistan. Since then a great range of courses at various levels have been added to the university's graduate and postgraduate programme lists including a postdoctoral course offered by the Department of Chemistry. Currently, University of Kurdistan has over 9000 students, of which over 25 per cent are postgraduate students. University of Kurdistan has an autonomous college (Pardis), 8 faculties and 45 departments offering 170 undergraduate and postgraduate courses. Moreover, UOK employs approximately 339 full-time academic faculty members with over 95 per cent having Assistant Professorship or above grading (16 Full Professors and 68 Associate Professors). In addition, many part-time teaching staff are employed and the number of administrative staff totals 385.

Currently, the university has 8 research institutes and 7 academic journals and has its own publishing press with many yearly publications. Moreover, UOK has plentiful research and teaching laboratories to aid students and staff at all faculties.

UOK has a non-centralized administrative structure managed by the Board of Trustees (which has the highest position in the University and overlooks future educational expansion, financial projections and other major plans of the University), the Chancellor, 5 Vice Chancellors (Vice Chancellors for Educational and Academic Affairs, Research Affairs, Student Affairs, Financial Affairs and Cultural and Social Affairs), Board of Directors and the University Council.

== Faculties ==
University of Kurdistan has the following faculties:

- Faculty of Agriculture
- Faculty of Art and Architecture
- Faculty of Engineering
- Faculty of Humanities and Social Sciences
- Faculty of Language and Literature
- Faculty of Natural Resources
- Faculty of Science
- Bijar Faculty of Science and Engineering

=== Faculty of Agriculture ===
The Faculty of Agriculture was founded jointly with the Faculty of Natural Resources in 1991. In 2007, the Faculty of Agriculture separated from the Faculty of Natural Resources and commenced its academic teaching and research activities on an independent basis. It is currently one of the major providers of research in agricultural fields in the region. Both training and research are undertaken at the highest professional level and a wide range of agriculture based scientific courses are offered to graduate and postgraduate students. The faculty's mission is to develop resources and technology to provide contemporary and future needs of the agricultural sector of Kurdistan province, to advance and disseminate knowledge and to provide advice and guidance in the field of agriculture for sustainable economic development. The faculty has 8 departments, offering 12 undergraduate degree programmes and 24 postgraduate degree programmes (including 7 PhD degree programmes):

- Plant Production and Genetics
- Animal Science
- Soil Science
- Horticultural Science & Engineering
- Biosystems Engineering
- Water Sciences and Engineering
- Agricultural Economics
- Plant Protection

At present, the Faculty of Agriculture has over 1000 students and 69 full-time academic members of staff. The faculty has 28 laboratories including Soil Chemistry Laboratory, Soil Physics Laboratory, Plant Breeding Laboratory, Plant Pathology, Genetics Laboratory, Entomology Laboratory, Poultry Production Unit, Quail Production Unit, Dairy Cattle Production Unit. In addition, this faculty has four greenhouses and 50 hectares of agricultural research fields.

Faculty of Agriculture List of Degree Programmes
Department	Degree Programme	BA/BSc	MA/MSc	PhD
Animal Science	Animal Science	*		
Animal Science	Animal Breeding		*	*
Animal Science	Animal Physiology		*	*
Animal Science	Animal Nutrition		*	*
Agronomy & Plant Breeding	Production and Plant Genetic Engineering (Agrotechnology & Biotechnology)	*		
Agronomy & Plant Breeding	Plant Genetic and Breeding		*	
Agronomy & Plant Breeding	Agroecology		*	
Agronomy & Plant Breeding	Agricultural Biotechnology		*	*
Agronomy & Plant Breeding	Agronomy (Crop Physiology)			*
Horticultural Sciences and Engineering	Food Science & Technology	*		
Horticultural Sciences and Engineering	Landscape Engineering	*		
Horticultural Sciences and Engineering	Horticultural Science & Engineering	*		
Horticultural Sciences and Engineering	Horticultural Science & Engineering: Fruit Trees		*	
Horticultural Sciences and Engineering	Horticultural Science & Engineering: Vegetables		*	
Horticultural Sciences and Engineering	Horticultural Science & Engineering: Medicinal Plants		*	
Horticultural Sciences and Engineering	Horticultural Science & Engineering: Ornamental Plants		*	
Soil Science	Soil Science & Engineering	*		
Soil Science	Soil Biology and Biotechnology		*	
Soil Science	Soil Physics & Conservation		*	
Soil Science	Soil Resources & Land Evaluation		*	
Agricultural Economics	Agricultural Economics	*		
Agricultural Economics	Agricultural Policy & Development		*	
Agricultural Economics	Agricultural Extension & Education		*	
Plant Protection	Plant Protection	*		
Plant Protection	Agricultural Entomology		*	
Plant Protection	Plant Pathology		*	*
Water Sciences & Engineering	Water Sciences & Engineering	*		
Water Sciences & Engineering	Irrigation & Drainage Engineering		*	
Hydroinformatics		*		
Biosystems Engineering	Mechanics & Biosystems Engineering	*		
Biosystems Engineering	Design and Construction		*	
Biosystems Engineering	Postharvest Technology		*	
Biosystems Engineering	Renewable Energies		*	
Food Industry Machinery Engineering	*			

=== Faculty of Art and Architecture ===
Because of the importance of Art, architecture and planning at national and international levels and the rich history of the arts in western Iran, especially in Kurdistan, the University of Kurdistan launched programs in the aforementioned fields in the early years of its establishment as a university. The University of Kurdistan commenced offering degree programs in Architecture, Planning and Music in 1999, 2006 and 2016, respectively. These two departments were initially part of the Faculty of Engineering but in 2012 became part of the newly established Faculty of Art and Architecture. In light of its expansion and development plans, the Faculty of Art and Architecture is in the process of establishing degree programs in Handicraft as well as aiming to offer its existing degree programs at PhD level in near future. In total, the faculty currently has three departments:

- Urban Planning
- Architecture
- Music (Iranian)

The Faculty of Art & Architecture has 12 full-time academic staff and numerous part-time staff with a total student population of 302.

Research in the faculty is clustered around a number of research themes including architecture, urbanism public sphere, environmental psychology, informal settlements and sustainability.

Faculty of Art & Architecture List of Degree Programmes
Department	Degree Programme	BA/BSc	MA/MSc	PhD
Architecture	Architecture	*	*	
Urban Development	Urban Development	*		
Urban Development	Urban & Regional Planning		*	
Urban Development	Urban Design		*	
Music	Iranian Music	*		

=== Faculty of Engineering ===
The Faculty of Engineering at present has 7 Departments offering 9 undergraduate degree programmes and 21 postgraduate degree programmes (including 3 PhD programmes).

- Department of Chemical Engineering
- Department of Civil Engineering
- Department of Computer & IT Engineering
- Department of Electrical Engineering
- Department of Industrial Engineering
- Department of Mechanical Engineering
- Department of Mine Engineering

Faculty of Engineering List of Degree Programmes
Department	Degree Programme	BA/BSc	MA/MSc	PhD
Chemical Engineering	Chemical Engineering	*		
Chemical Engineering	Chemical Engineering – Design Process		*	
Civil Engineering	Civil Engineering	*		
Civil Engineering	Remote Sensing		*	
Civil Engineering	Earthquake Engineering		*	
Civil Engineering	Hydraulics & Water Resources Management		*	
Civil Engineering	Structural Engineering		*	*
Electrical Engineering	Electrical Engineering	*	*	
Electrical Engineering	Electronic Integrated Circuits		*	
Electrical Engineering	Micro and Nano-Electronic devices		*	
Electrical Engineering	Communication Systems		*	
Electrical Engineering	Electrical Control Engineering		*	
Electrical Engineering	Power Systems Engineering	*	*	*
Computer Engineering and IT	Computer Software Engineering	*		
Computer Engineering and IT	Information Technology	*		
Computer Engineering and IT	Artificial Intelligence		*	
Industrial Engineering	Industrial Engineering	*	*	*
Industrial Engineering	Logistics & Supply Chain		*	
Industrial Engineering	System Optimization		*	
Mechanical Engineering	Mechanical Engineering	*		
Mechanical Engineering	Mechanical Engineering - Applied Design		*	
Mechanical Engineering	Energy Conversion- Heat & Fluids		*	
Mine Engineering	Mine Engineering	*		
Mine Engineering	Mineral Exploration		*	

=== Faculty of Humanities and Social Sciences ===
The Faculty of Humanities and Social Sciences currently has 11 departments that are involved in teaching and research activities. It has approximately 2500 students who are on 9 programmes leading to an undergraduate degree, 18 programmes leading to master's degree and 4 programmes leading to a PhD:

- Accounting
- Business Management
- Educational Sciences
- Physical Education
- Law
- Shafe’ee Jurisprudence and Law
- Psychology
- Sociology
- Counseling
- Economics
- Islamic Studies

This faculty has two student computer centers, an advanced computer teaching, a sport sciences laboratory and research centre, two other laboratories for counseling and psychology departments, Hazhar Library, and conference and seminar facilities including Ferdowsi, Mastoureh Ardalan and Mawlawi Halls. The Faculty of Humanities and Social Sciences currently has 64 permanent academic members of staff and numerous part-time teaching staff.

Faculty of Humanities and Social Sciences List of Degree Programmes
Department	Degree Programme	BA/BSc	MA/MSc	PhD
Accounting	Accounting	*	*	
Business Administration	Business Administration	*		
Business Administration	Tourism Management	*		
Business Administration	Marketing Management		*	
Business Administration	MBA		*	
Psychology	Psychology	*		
Psychology	Clinical Psychology		*	
Psychology	Cognitive Psychology		*	
Economic Sciences	Economic Sciences – Theoretical Economics	*		
Economic Sciences	Economic Sciences		*	
Economic Sciences	Economic Development & Planning		*	
Educational Science	Educational Administration & Planning	*		
Educational Science	Curriculum Planning		*	
Educational Science	Educational Planning		*	
Educational Science	Educational Administration		*	*
Educational Science	Higher Education Development Planning			*
Counselling	Family Counselling		*	
Counselling	School Counselling		*	
Law	Law	*		
Law	Criminal Law & Criminology		*	
Shafe’ee Jurisprudence & Law	Shafe’ee Jurisprudence & Law	*	*	
Physical Education	Sports Life Sciences	*		
Physical Education	Sports Management		*	
Physical Education	Sports Physiology		*	
Physical Education	Marketing Management in Sport		*	*
Physical Education	Sport Physiology - Sports Biochemistry and Metabolism			*
Sociology	Social Sciences Research	*		
Sociology	Sociology		*	

=== Faculty of Language and Literature ===
The Faculty of Language and Literature activities officially began its teaching and research activities in October 2012 and prior to that it was part of the Faculty of Literature and Humanities. It is worth mentioning that the disbanded Faculty of Literature and Humanities was established in 1991 as the second faculty of the University of Kurdistan, but began its teaching activities much earlier in 1976 by accepting students majoring in English language teacher training and later establishing 14 departments. The Faculty of Language and Literature currently has 4 departments offering 5 undergraduate programmes, 5 Master's programmes and 1 PhD programme to over 760 students:

- English Language and Linguistics
- Persian Language and Literature
- Arabic Language and Literature
- Kurdish Language and Literature

At present, this faculty has 30 full-time academic members of staff and many part-time teaching staff.

Faculty of Language and Literature List of Degree Programmes
Department	Degree Programme	BA/BSc	MA/MSc	PhD
Arabic Language & Literature	Arabic Language & Literature	*	*	
English Literature & Linguistics	English Language & Literature	*	*	
English Literature & Linguistics	Teaching English as a foreign language	*	*	
English Literature & Linguistics	Linguistics		*	
Persian Language & Literature	Persian Language & Literature	*	*	*
Kurdish Language and Literature	Kurdish Language and Literature	*		

=== Faculty of Natural Resources ===
The Faculty of Natural Resources was founded jointly with the Faculty of Agriculture in 1991. In 2007, the Faculty of Natural Resources disbanded from the Faculty of Agriculture and commenced its academic teaching and research activities on an independent basis. The Faculty of Natural Resources focuses on the conservation, protection, rehabilitation, management and enhancement of renewable natural resources including: forests, rangelands, water reservoirs, soil, biodiversity and related resources. Currently, the Faculty of Natural Resources has 6 departments (as listed below) that offer 6 undergraduate programs and 13 Masters programs (see below table). The faculty has 34 full-time and more than 24 part-time academic staff that offer teaching and research services to over 1000 students. This faculty has various laboratories and research centers including: Research aquarium, Fish Pathobiology Laboratory, Fish Biology, Range and Forest Biology Laboratory, Forest Biometry Laboratory, Climatology Laboratory, Geomorphology Laboratory, Herbarium, GIS and RS Centre, Cartography Centre, Classic and Automatic Synoptic Station, Animal Biology laboratory, Laboratorial Animal captivity, Taxidermy center, Soil, Water and Air Quality Control Laboratory. Departments:

- Forestry
- Rangeland and Watershed Management
- Aquaculture
- Environmental Sciences
- Geomorphology
- Climatology

Natural Resources Faculty Programs
Department	Course Name	BSc.	MSc.
Environmental Sciences	Environmental Engineering	*	
Environmental Sciences	Biodiversity and Conservation Biology		*
Environmental Sciences	Land-use Planning & Sustainable Development		*
Environmental Sciences	Environmental Pollution (Air, Soil and Water)		*
Environmental Sciences	Environmental Technologies		*
Fisheries	Fisheries Engineering	*	
Fisheries	Aquaculture		*
Fisheries	Fish Biology and Aquatic Animals Ecology		*
Forestry	Forest Science and Engineering	*	
Forestry	Forest Management		*
Forestry	Forest Biology & Silviculture		*
Forestry	Agroforestry		*
Rangeland & Watershed Management	Rangeland & Watershed Engineering	*	
Rangeland & Watershed Management	Rangeland Management		*
Rangeland & Watershed Management	Watershed Management		*
Rangeland & Watershed Management	Eco-Hydrology		*
Geomorphology	Geomorphology Engineering	*	
Geomorphology	Natural Hazards		*
Geomorphology	Hydro-Geomorphology		*
Climatology	Climatology	*	
Climatology	Applied Climatology		*

=== Faculty of Science ===
The faculty has six departments: Biological Sciences

- Chemistry
- Earth Sciences
- Mathematics
- Physics
- Statistics

Faculty of science has over 1100 students on 7 programmes leading to an undergraduate degree, 17 programmes leading to a master's degree and 15 programmes leading to a PhD. Moreover, it has many teaching and research laboratories including 12 Chemistry laboratories, 8 Physics laboratories, and 5 Biology laboratories, 3 Mathematics and Statistics laboratories and 1 Geology laboratory.

Faculty of Science List of Degree Programmes
Department	Degree Programme	BA/BSc	MA/MSc	PhD
Chemistry	Applied Chemistry	*		
Chemistry	Pure Chemistry	*		
Chemistry	Nano Chemistry		*	*
Chemistry	Polymer Chemistry		*	
Chemistry	Analytical Chemistry		*	*
Chemistry	Inorganic Chemistry		*	*
Chemistry	Organic Chemistry		*	*
Chemistry	Physical Chemistry		*	*
Mathematics	Mathematics and Applications	*		
Mathematics	Pure Mathematics- Topology		*	
Mathematics	Applied Mathematics— Numerical Analysis		*	*
Mathematics	Pure Mathematics – Mathematical Analysis		*	*
Mathematics	Pure Mathematics – Algebra		*	*
Statistics	Statistics	*		
Statistics	Mathematical Statistics		*	
Physics	Physics	*		
Physics	Fundamental Physics (Theoretical Physics)		*	
Physics	Solid State Physics		*	*
Physics	Theoretical Physics - Quantum Optics			*
Physics	Theoretical Physics – Astronomy and Astrophysics			*
Physics	Theoretical Physics- Quantum Information and Computation			*
Physics	Theoretical Physics- Gravity & Cosmology			*
Physics	Photonics		*	*
Biology	Biotechnology	*		
Biology	Cellular & Molecular Biology		*	
Biology	Biochemistry		*	
Earth Sciences	Earth Sciences	*		
Earth Sciences	Geochemistry		*	

=== Bijar Faculty of Science and Engineering ===
The Bijar Faculty of Science and Engineering was established in September 2014 and commenced its pedagogical activities in the fields of Computer Science, Physics and Statistics as listed below. As its name indicates, this faculty is located in the city of Bijar, a city in Kurdistan Province. Departments:

- Computer-science
- Statistics
- Physics

Bijar Faculty of Science & Engineering List of Degree Programmes
Department	Degree Programme	BA/BSc	MA/MSc	PhD
Computer Science	Computer Science	*		
Physics	Physics		*	
Statistics	Statistics & Applications	*		

=== UOK Autonomous College (Pardis) ===
Following the remarkable success of University of Kurdistan's educational and research activities, the Council of Higher Education in July 2013 agreed to the establishment of an Autonomous College citing the existence of adequate infrastructure such as adequate physical space, sufficient human resources including faculty members and experienced administrative staff, workshops, laboratories, computer sites, library resources, study halls, sports facilities, as well as performance and management of the university campus.

This onsite but independent college currently offers 22 Master's programmes including Urban Planning, Construction Engineering, Industrial Engineering, Agricultural Economics, Pomology, and Sports Physiology. The Autonomous College aims to expand its list of offered courses in the near future.

== Research Institutes ==
=== Nanotechnology Research Institute ===
The Nanotechnology Research Institute of the University of Kurdistan conducts research and provides guidance on synthesis and applications of nanomaterials. This research institute is supported by the Iranian Nanotechnology Initiative and the Ministry of Science, Research and Technology. More than 40 academic staff and postgraduate students collaborate on research projects at the institute and since its establishment in 2011, have published more than 60 academic papers in internationally renowned journals. It has three research groups: Nano Chemistry, Nano-Materials and Theoretical Studies and Simulation.

=== Smart/Micro Grids Research Center ===
The Smart/Micro Grids Research Center (SMGRC) is an international research center officially established in October 2016. The SMGRC provides a rich source of training, testing, and experimental laboratorial facilities for various smart grid and microgrid (MG) academic/industrial projects, specifically in the area of advanced robust and intelligent control synthesis and analysis methodologies. In addition to the modeling and simulation environment for training and educational purposes, a wide range of distributed generators (e.g., PV panel, wind turbine, diesel generator), energy capacitor systems, grid components, modules, and sub-systems are available for different classes of testing and validation capabilities. The SMGRC flexibility allows working on multiple configurations in MG types (DC, AC, and hybrid), operating modes (grid-connected and islanded) and multiple MGs clusters. The central core of the existing platform is a real-time simulator that can be connected to hardware equipment through power amplifiers. The University of Kurdistan and West Regional Electric Co. (WREC) are the main domestic supporters of the SMGRC. The SMGRC team comprises a continuously increasing number of post-graduate students, and visiting researchers covers various aspects of research in smart grid and microgrids.

=== Center of computer emergency response team (CERT) ===
The center of computer emergency response team (CERT) at the University of Kurdistan is concerned with handling computer and network security system incidents. Considering cyber security challenges, CERT center focuses on response to security vulnerabilities in web applications, networked systems and software products. This center's mission is to enhance the security of cyberspace products through traffic monitoring, malware analysis, penetration testing, and intrusion detection.

Moreover, CERT as a research center contributes in implementing information security tools through research and development programs. It also conducts workshops and short educational programs in the field of ICT security for students and IT professionals.

=== Kurdish Studies Research Institute ===
The Kurdish Studies Research Institute was formally established in 2000 by the authority of the Ministry of Science, Research and Technology. This research institute has three research groups: Kurdish Literature and Linguistics, Kurdish Cultural Studies and History and Kurdish Strategic Studies and Development. The main goal of the institute is to undertake research in the fields of Kurdish language, literature and culture and to represent their richness to the full extent. Furthermore, it recently became successful in offering a degree programme in Kurdish Language and Literature at undergraduate level and aims to introduce the subject at postgraduate levels also.

The numerous projects and conferences that have transpired at this institute serve the aforementioned objectives. Projects accomplished thus far include the publication of the University of Kurdistan Persian - Kurdish Dictionary, the quarterly Journal of Kurdish Literature, and many books related to Kurdish language and literature. In 2010, the First International Conference on Kurdish Literature took place at the Faculty of Literature and Humanities, UOK, organized by the institute which was followed by the First Conference on Ardalan Dynasty in 2011. This was followed by three commemoration ceremonies of Dr. Maheen Dokht Motamadi (2014), Ahmad Ghazi and Ahmad Sharifi (2015). In addition, regular training workshops are held by the institute and a valuable reference library with more than 7500 books in the field of Kurdish studies is open to interested researchers.

== See also ==
- Academy of Gondishapur
- Darolfonoon
- Education in Iran
- Higher education in Iran
- List of Iranian Research Centers
- List of Iranian scientists from the pre-modern era.
- Modern Iranian scientists and engineers
- National Library of Iran
- Nizamiyya
