= Poshtkuh District (Khash County) =

District in Sistan and Baluchestan province, Iran

Poshtkuh District Persian: بخش پشتکوه
- District
- Location within Iran
- Coordinates: 28°17′25″N 62°01′14″E
- Country: Iran
- Province: Sistan and Baluchestan
- County: Khash
- Capital: Gurchan
- Time zone: UTC+3:30 (IRST)

Poshtkuh District (Persian: بخش پشتکوه) is in Khash County, Sistan and Baluchestan province, Iran. Its capital is the village of Gurchan, whose population at the time of the 2016 National Census was 385 people in 139 households.

== History ==
In 2019, Poshtkuh Rural District was separated from the Central District in the formation of Poshtkuh District.

== Demographics ==
=== Administrative divisions ===
Poshtkuh District
Administrative Divisions
Bilari RD
Poshtkuh RD
RD = Rural District
