= Esmailabad Rural District (Khash County) =

Rural district in Sistan and Baluchestan province, Iran

Esmailabad Rural District Persian: دهستان اسماعيل آباد
- Rural District
- Location within Iran
- Coordinates: 28°17′40″N 61°05′43″E
- Country: Iran
- Province: Sistan and Baluchestan
- County: Khash
- District: Central
- Capital: Abbasabad

Population (2016)
  - Total: 17,577
- Time zone: UTC+3:30 (IRST)

Esmailabad Rural District (Persian: دهستان اسماعيل آباد) is in the Central District of Khash County, Sistan and Baluchestan province, Iran. Its capital is the village of Abbasabad.

== Demographics ==
=== Population ===
At the time of the 2006 National Census, the rural district's population was 16,940 in 3,441 households. There were 16,895 inhabitants in 3,699 households at the following census of 2011. The 2016 census measured the population of the rural district as 17,577 in 4,430 households. The most populous of its 106 villages was Esmailabad (now a city), with 4,868 people.
