= Kuh Sefid Rural District (Khash County) =

Rural district in Sistan and Baluchestan province, Iran

Kuh Sefid Rural District Persian: دهستان كوه سفيد
- Rural District
- Location within Iran
- Coordinates: 28°04′32″N 61°23′58″E
- Country: Iran
- Province: Sistan and Baluchestan
- County: Khash
- District: Central
- Capital: Bayatabad

Population (2016)
  - Total: 13,773
- Time zone: UTC+3:30 (IRST)

Kuh Sefid Rural District (Persian: دهستان كوه سفيد) is in the Central District of Khash County, Sistan and Baluchestan province, Iran. Its capital is the village of Bayatabad.

== Demographics ==
=== Population ===
At the time of the 2006 National Census, the rural district's population was 10,603 in 2,137 households. There were 12,069 inhabitants in 2,937 households at the following census of 2011. The 2016 census measured the population of the rural district as 13,773 in 4,105 households. The most populous of its 160 villages was Naseri, with 1,806 people.
