= Karvandar Rural District =

Rural district in Sistan and Baluchestan province, Iran

Karvandar Rural District Persian: دهستان كارواندر
- Rural District
- Location within Iran
- Coordinates: 27°53′55″N 60°43′48″E
- Country: Iran
- Province: Sistan and Baluchestan
- County: Khash
- District: Central
- Capital: Karvandar

Population (2016)
  - Total: 7,153
- Time zone: UTC+3:30 (IRST)

Karvandar Rural District (Persian: دهستان كارواندر) is in the Central District of Khash County, Sistan and Baluchestan province, Iran. Its capital is the village of Karvandar.

== Demographics ==
=== Population ===
At the time of the 2006 National Census, the rural district's population was 6,028 in 1,287 households. There were 6,324 inhabitants in 1,499 households at the following census of 2011. The 2016 census measured the population of the rural district as 7,153 in 2,076 households. The most populous of its 127 villages was Kahn-e Nuk, with 457 people.
