= Poshtkuh Rural District (Khash County) =

Rural district in Sistan and Baluchestan province, Iran

Poshtkuh Rural District Persian: دهستان پشتكوه
- Rural District
- Location within Iran
- Coordinates: 28°24′30″N 61°56′12″E
- Country: Iran
- Province: Sistan and Baluchestan
- County: Khash
- District: Poshtkuh
- Capital: Afzalabad

Population (2016)
  - Total: 13,587
- Time zone: UTC+3:30 (IRST)

Poshtkuh Rural District (Persian: دهستان پشتكوه) is in Poshtkuh District of Khash County, Sistan and Baluchestan province, Iran. Its capital is the village of Afzalabad.

== Demographics ==
=== Population ===
At the time of the 2006 National Census, the rural district's population (as a part of the Central District) was 13,612 in 2,469 households. There were 12,237 inhabitants in 2,783 households at the following census of 2011. The 2016 census measured the population of the rural district as 13,587 in 3,920 households. The most populous of its 157 villages was Shahrak-e Posht Giaban, with 1,223 people.

In 2019, the rural district was separated from the district in the formation of Poshtkuh District.
