= Sangan Rural District =

Rural district in Sistan and Baluchestan province, Iran

Sangan Rural District Persian: دهستان سنگان
- Rural District
- Location within Iran
- Coordinates: 28°32′03″N 61°20′22″E
- Country: Iran
- Province: Sistan and Baluchestan
- County: Khash
- District: Central
- Capital: Sangan

Population (2016)
  - Total: 6,411
- Time zone: UTC+3:30 (IRST)

Sangan Rural District (Persian: دهستان سنگان) is in the Central District of Khash County, Sistan and Baluchestan province, Iran. Its capital is the village of Sangan. The previous capital of the rural district was the village of Esmailabad, now a city.

== Demographics ==
=== Population ===
At the time of the 2006 National Census, the rural district's population was 7,248 in 1,660 households. There were 6,187 inhabitants in 1,416 households at the following census of 2011. The 2016 census measured the population of the rural district as 6,411 in 1,854 households. The most populous of its 59 villages was Shahrak-e Dorudi, with 528 people.
