= Central District (Khash County) =

District in Sistan and Baluchestan province, Iran

Central District (Khash County) Persian: بخش مرکزی شهرستان خاش
- District
- Location within Iran
- Coordinates: 28°11′25″N 61°07′34″E
- Country: Iran
- Province: Sistan and Baluchestan
- County: Khash
- Capital: Khash

Population (2016)
  - Total: 115,085
- Time zone: UTC+3:30 (IRST)

The Central District of Khash County (Persian: بخش مرکزی شهرستان خاش) is in Sistan and Baluchestan province, Iran. Its capital is the city of Khash.

== History ==
In 2019, Poshtkuh Rural District was separated from the district in the formation of Poshtkuh District, including the new Bilari Rural District. In addition, the village of Esmailabad was elevated to the status of a city.

== Demographics ==
=== Population ===
At the time of the 2006 census, the district's population was 111,114 in 21,170 households. The following census in 2011 counted 107,817 people in 24,055 households. The 2016 census measured the population of the district as 115,085 inhabitants in 30,769 households.

=== Administrative divisions ===
Central District (Khash County) Population
Administrative Divisions	2006	2011	2016
Esmailabad RD	16,940	16,895	17,577
Karvandar RD	6,028	6,324	7,153
Kuh Sefid RD	10,603	12,069	13,773
Poshtkuh RD (Note: Transferred to Poshtkuh District after the 2016 census)	13,612	12,237	13,587
Sangan RD	7,248	6,187	6,411
Esmailabad (city) (Note: Became a city after the 2016 census)			
Khash (city)	56,683	54,105	56,584
Total	111,114	107,817	115,085
RD = Rural District
