= Khash County =

County in Sistan and Baluchestan province, Iran

Khash County Persian: شهرستان خاش
- County
- Location of Khash County in Sistan and Baluchestan province (center right, yellow)

- Location of Sistan and Baluchestan province in Iran
- Coordinates: 28°05′28″N 61°37′48″E
- Country: Iran
- Province: Sistan and Baluchestan
- Capital: Khash
- Districts: Central, Irandegan, Poshtkuh

Population (2016)
  - Total: 173,821
- Time zone: UTC+3:30 (IRST)

Khash County (Persian: شهرستان خاش) is in Sistan and Baluchestan province, Iran. Its capital is the city of Khash.

== History ==
After the 2016 National Census, the villages of Deh-e Rais and Esmailabad were elevated to city status. In 2019, Poshtkuh Rural District was separated from the Central District in the formation of Poshtkuh District, including the new Bilari Rural District. In the same year, Nukabad District was separated from the county in the establishment of Taftan County.

== Demographics ==
=== Population ===
At the time of the 2006 census, the county's population was 161,918 in 32,478 households. The following census in 2011 counted 155,652 people in 35,476 households. The 2016 census measured the population of the county as 173,821 in 48,396 households.

=== Administrative divisions ===
Khash County's population history and administrative structure over three consecutive censuses are shown in the following table.

Khash County Population
Administrative Divisions	2006	2011	2016
Central District	111,114	107,817	115,085
Esmailabad RD	16,940	16,895	17,577
Karvandar RD	6,028	6,324	7,153
Kuh Sefid RD	10,603	12,069	13,773
Poshtkuh RD	13,612	12,237	13,587
Sangan RD	7,248	6,187	6,411
Esmailabad (city) (Note: Became a city after the 2016 census)			
Khash (city)	56,683	54,105	56,584
Irandegan District	12,432	11,170	13,323
Irandegan RD	4,232	2,973	4,056
Kahnuk RD	8,200	8,197	9,267
Deh-e Rais (city) (Note: Became a city after the 2016 census)			
Nukabad District (Note: Transferred to Taftan County after the 2016 census)	38,372	36,506	44,176
Eskelabad RD	6,527	6,295	6,015
Gowhar Kuh RD	9,100	8,383	10,078
Nazil RD	10,573	9,335	11,097
Taftan-e Jonubi RD	9,351	9,300	11,725
Nukabad (city)	2,821	3,193	5,261
Poshtkuh District (Note: Established after the 2016 census)			
Bilari RD			
Poshtkuh RD			
Total	161,918	155,652	173,821
RD = Rural District

== Economy and infrastructure ==
=== Infrastructure ===
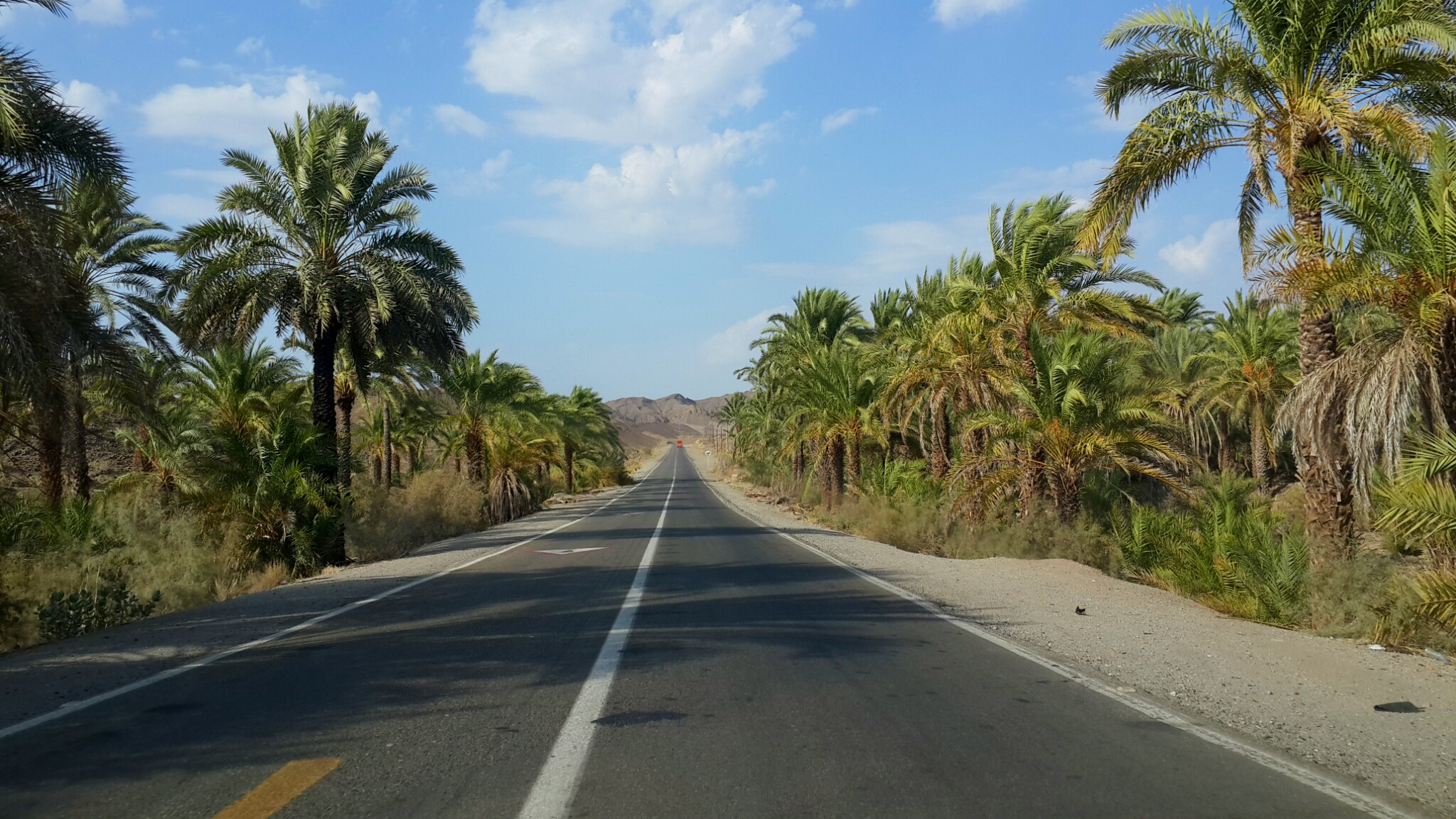
Iranshahr to Khash city road

The city of Khash was located in the middle of the Iranshahr-Zahedan road. historically, due to the strategic location of the city in the middle of the province, it was the center of the political administration of Iran's Balochistan in the west. The city of Khash is located on the route of the desalinated sea water pipeline from Arabian sea to the east of Iran, which supplies the water needed by industries. Also, the drinking water of the city is supplied through Karvander dam.

=== Industries ===
The people of the city are mainly engaged in the food industry, agriculture in the surrounding areas, mining (especially cement and iron ore) and handicrafts, and trade with Pakistan (and fuel smuggling).

Khash handicrafts show the peak of art, elegance and culture of Khash people. Among the handicrafts of Khash people are needlework, mat weaving, carpet weaving, back and khurjin weaving, coin and mirror embroidery, curtain weaving, goldsmithing, black curtain weaving, financial felt, inlay work, woven fabric, jewelry making, cream, Perivar embroidery, production of musical instruments and making wall hangings are the main handicraft arts in Khash city.

=== Public services ===
In the city of Khash, there is a well-equipped Imam Khomeini hospital, several specialized medical clinics, courts, numerous centers of the police and other law enforcement, security and military forces, a large number of small mosques, as well as the Jame (Grand) Mosque of Khash.

=== Education ===
Khash Islamic Azad University is located in Khash city.

Also, Khash Faculty of Industry and Mining is located in Khash city, which is a branch of Sistan and Baluchistan University. This faculty started its activity in 2013 with the training of mining engineering, computer engineering and industrial engineering, and its purpose is to train expert staff for the industrial and mining development of Khash region.

== See also ==
Media related to Khash County at Wikimedia Commons
