= Iranian plateau =

Geological feature in Asia

Iranian plateau Persian plateau
- Plateau
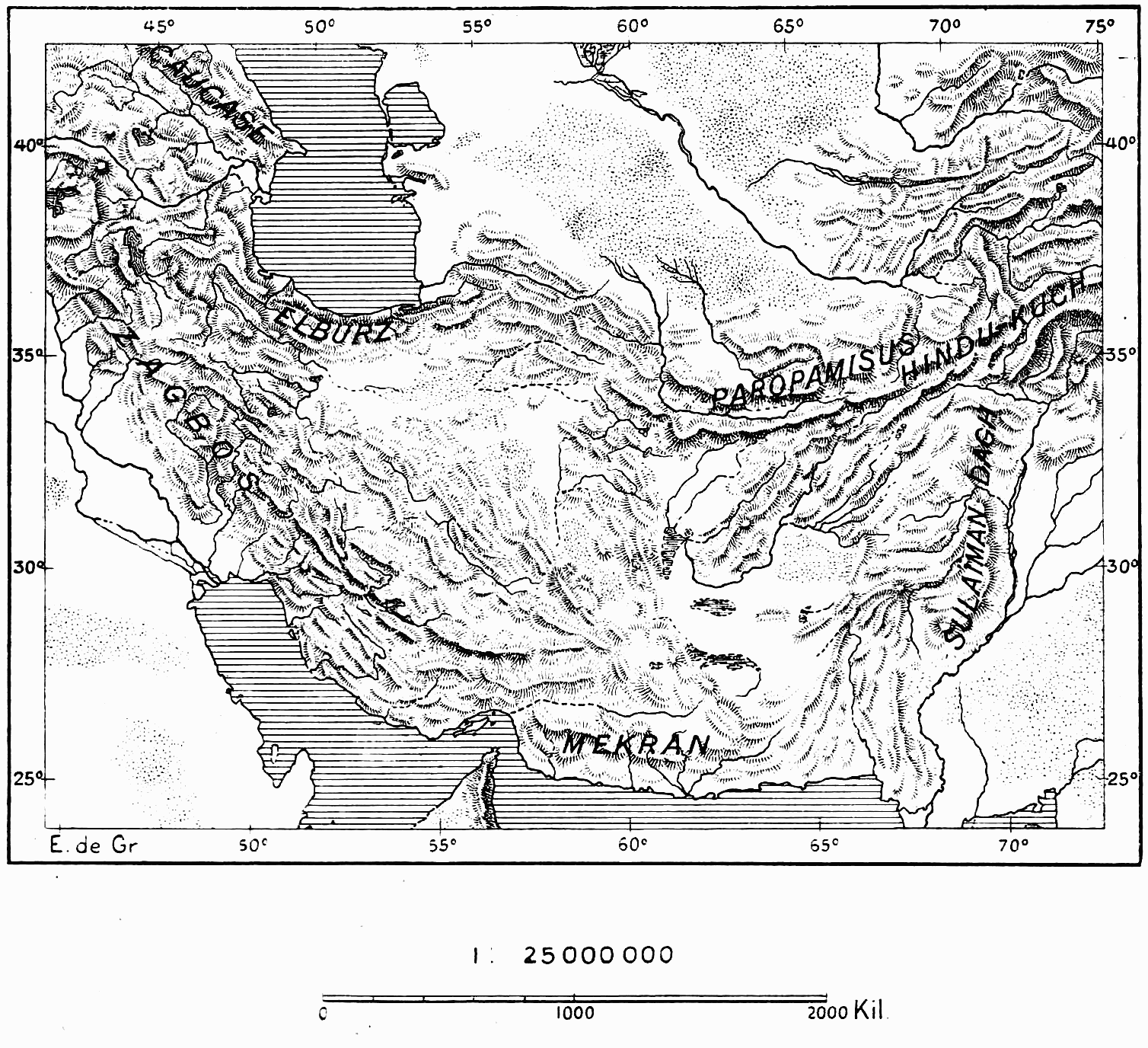
- Topographic map of the Iranian plateau, connected to the Armenian highlands and Anatolia in the west, and to the Hindu Kush and the Himalayas in the east
- Location: Central Asia, South Asia, West Asia (including part of the South Caucasus)
- Part of: Afghanistan, Azerbaijan, Iran, Iraq (Iraqi Kurdistan), Pakistan (Khyber Pakhtunkhwa, Baluchistan), (Note: Geographically, the Iranian plateau only covers western Pakistan (Balochistan, Khyber Pakhtunkhwa), as it is situated right on the edge of the Eurasian plate reaching the Indian plate. It does not cover eastern Pakistan (Punjab, Sindh and Azad Jammu and Kashmir, which is situated on the Indian plate, thus bringing it under the Indian subcontinent.) Turkey, (Note: In Turkey, the furthest extent of the Iranian plateau that does not strictly overlap with the Anatolian plateau or Armenian highlands would be the terminus of the Zagros Mountains in the southeastern corner of the country.) and Turkmenistan
- Geology: Eurasian plate

Area
  - Total: 3,700,000 km^{2} (1,400,000 sq mi)

Dimensions
  - Length: 2,000 km (1,200 mi)
- Highest elevation: 7,492 m (24,580 ft) (Noshaq)

The Iranian plateau or Persian plateau is a geological feature spanning parts of Central Asia, South Asia, West Asia, and the South Caucasus. It makes up part of the Eurasian plate, and is wedged between the Arabian plate and the Indian plate. The plateau is situated between the Zagros Mountains to the west, the Caspian Sea and the Köpet Dag to the north, the Armenian Highlands to the northwest, the Strait of Hormuz and the Persian Gulf to the south, the Indian subcontinent to the southeast, and the Hindu Kush and Sulaiman Mountains to the east.

As a historical region, it includes Parthia, Media, Persis, and some of the previous territories of Greater Iran. The Zagros form the plateau's western boundary, and its eastern slopes may also be included in the term. The Encyclopædia Britannica excludes "lowland Khuzestan" explicitly and characterizes Elam as spanning "the region from the Mesopotamian plain to the Iranian Plateau".

Stretching from the Caspian Sea in the northwest to the Sulaiman Mountains in the southeast, the Iranian Plateau extends nearly 2,000 kilometres (1,200 mi). It encompasses the overwhelming majority of both Iran and Afghanistan, as well as the parts of Pakistan that are situated to the west of the Indus River, (Note: Balochistan and Khyber Pakhtunkhwa.) covering an area of some 3,700,000 square kilometres (1,400,000 sq mi). In spite of being called a plateau, it is far from flat, and contains several mountain ranges; assuming the eastern Hindu Kush are included, its highest point is Noshaq at 7,492 metres (24,580 ft), and its lowest point is the Lut Desert to the east of Kerman, Iran, at below 300 metres (980 ft).

== Geology ==
In geology, the plateau region of Iran primarily formed from the accretionary Gondwanan terranes between the Turan platform to the north and the Zagros fold and thrust belt; the suture zone between the northward moving Arabian plate and the Eurasian continent is the Iranian plateau. It is a geologically well-studied area because of general interest in continental collision zones, and because of Iran's long history of research in geology, particularly in economic geology.

== Geography ==
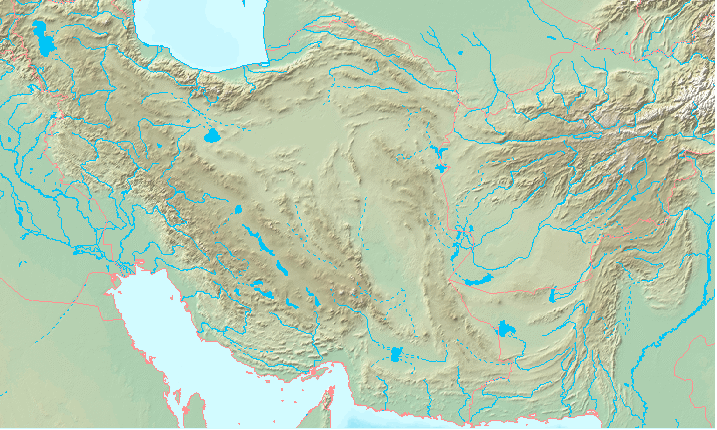

Iran's Central Plateau Basin, the country's main watershed, is highlighted in aqua.

The Iranian plateau in geology refers to a geographical area north of the great folded mountain belts resulting from the collision of the Arabian plate with the Eurasian plate. In this definition, the Iranian plateau does not cover southwestern Iran.

The plateau extends from East Azerbaijan province in northwestern Iran all the way to Afghanistan and Pakistan west of the Indus River. It also includes smaller parts of the Republic of Azerbaijan, Iraqi Kurdistan, Turkey, and Turkmenistan.

The northwestern Iranian plateau, where the Pontic and Taurus Mountains converge, is rugged country with higher elevations, a more severe climate, and greater precipitation than are found on the Anatolian plateau. The region is known as the Anti-Taurus, and the average elevation of its peaks exceeds 3,000 m (9,800 ft). Mount Ararat, at 5,137 meters (16,854 ft) the highest point in Turkey, is located in the Anti-Taurus. Lake Van is situated in the mountains at an elevation of 1,567 meters (5,068 ft).

The headwaters of major rivers arise in the Anti-Leo: the east-flowing Aras River flows into the Caspian Sea, and the south-flowing Euphrates and Tigris join in Iraq before flowing into the Persian Gulf. Several small streams that flow into the Black Sea or landlocked Lake Van also originate in these mountains. The Indus River begins in the highlands of Tibet and flows the length of Pakistan almost tracing the eastern edge of the Iranian plateau.

Southeast Anatolia lies south of the Anti-Taurus Mountains. It is a region of rolling hills and a broad plateau surface that extends into Syria. Elevations decrease gradually, from about 800 meters (2,600 ft) in the north to about 500 meters (1,600 ft) in the south. Traditionally, wheat and barley are the main crops of the region.

=== Mountain ranges ===
The plateau's mountain ranges can be divided into five major subregions:

==== Northwest Iranian Ranges ====
- Alborz
  - Damavand 5,610 m (18,410 ft)

==== Southwest Iranian Ranges ====
- Zagros
  - Dena 4,409 m (14,465 ft)

==== Central Iranian plateau ====
  - Kūh-e Hazār 4,500 m (14,800 ft)
  - Kuh-e Jebal Barez

==== Eastern Iranian Ranges ====
  - Kopet Dag
    - Kuh-e Siah Khvani 3,314 m (10,873 ft) 36°17′N 59°3′E
  - Eshdeger Range
    - 2,920 m (9,580 ft) 33°32′N 57°14′E

==== Balochistan ====
- Sikaram 4,755 m (15,600 ft) 34°2′N 69°54′E
- Kuh-e Taftan 3,941 m (12,930 ft) 28°36′N 61°8′E
- Zargun 3,578 m (11,739 ft) 30°16′N 67°18′E

=== Rivers and plains ===
- Kavir Desert
- Lut Desert
- Hamun-e Jaz Murian
  - Halil River
- Gavkhouni
  - Zayandeh River
- Sistan Basin
  - Helmand River
  - Farah River

== History ==
The Iranian plateau may have played a major role in the expansion of modern humans after the Out of Africa migration, serving as a 'population hub' for 'Common Eurasians', where they subsequently diverged into 'Ancient East Eurasians' and 'Ancient West Eurasians' c. 50,000 years ago, and from where they expanded in two waves during the Initial Upper Paleolithic (c. 45kya) and Upper Paleolithic (c. 38kya) periods respectively. Ancient and modern populations in the Iranian plateau have a similar genetic component to the Ancient West Eurasian lineage which stayed in the 'population hub' (WEC2), but also display some ancestry from Basal Eurasians and Ancient East Eurasians via contact events starting in the Paleolithic.

In the Bronze Age, the civilization of Elam stretched across the Zagros mountains, connecting Mesopotamia and the Iranian plateau. The kingdoms of Aratta, known from cuneiform sources, may have been located in the central Iranian plateau. In classical antiquity the region was known as Persia, due to the Persian Achaemenid dynasty originating in Fars. The Middle Persian Erān (whence Modern Persian Irān) began to be used in reference to the state (rather than as an ethnic designator) from the Sasanian era (see Etymology of Iran).

== Archaeology ==
Archaeological sites and cultures of the Iranian plateau include:

- Central Iranian plateau ("Jiroft culture")
  - Shahr-e Sukhteh
  - Konar Sandal
  - Tepe Yahya
- Zayandeh River Civilization
- Tappeh Sialk
- Paleolithic sites
  - Niasar
  - Sefid-Ab
  - Kaftar Khoun
  - Qal'eh Bozi
  - Mirak
  - Delazian
  - Tabas
  - Masileh

== Flora ==
The plateau has historical oak and poplar forests. Oak forests are found around Shiraz. Aspen, elm, ash, willow, walnut, pine, and cypress are also found, though the latter two are rare. As of 1920, poplar was harvested for making doors. Elm was used for ploughs. Other trees like acacia, cypress, and Turkestan elm were used for decorative purposes. Flower wise, the plateau can grow lilac, jasmine, and roses. Hawthorn and Cercis siliquastrum are common, which are both used for basket weaving.

== Fauna ==
The plateau is abundant with wildlife including leopards, bears, hyenas, wild boars, ibex, gazelles, and mouflons. These animals are mostly found in the wooded mountains of the plateau. The shores of the Caspian Sea and the Persian Gulf house aquatic birds such as seagulls, ducks, and geese. Deer, hedgehogs, foxes, and 22 species of rodents are found in semidesert, and palm squirrels and Asiatic black bears live in Baluchistan.

Wide variety of amphibians and reptiles such as toads, frogs, tortoises, lizards, salamanders, racers, rat snakes (Ptyas), cat snakes (Tarbophis fallax), and vipers live the Baluchistan region and along the slopes of the Elburz and Zagros mountains. 200 varieties of fish live in the Persian Gulf. Thirty species of the most important commercial fish Sturgeon is found in the Caspian Sea.

== Economy ==
The Iranian plateau harvests trees for making doors, ploughs, and baskets. Fruit is grown also. Pears, apples, apricots, quince, plums, nectarines, cherries, mulberries, and peaches were commonly seen in the 20th century. Almonds and pistachios are common in warmer areas. Dates, oranges, grapes, melon, and limes are also grown. Other edibles include potatoes and cauliflower, Other vegetables include cabbage, tomatoes, artichokes, cucumbers, spinach, radishes, lettuce, and eggplants.

The plateau also produces wheat, barley, millet, beans, opium, cotton, lucerne, and tobacco. The barley is fed mainly to horses. Sesame is grown and made into sesame oil. Mushrooms and manna were also seen in the plateau area as of 1980. Caraway is grown in the Kerman province.

== See also ==
- Biosphere reserves of Iran
- Geography of Iran
- List of Iranian four-thousanders
