= Iranrud =

Planned Caspian Sea-Persian Gulf canal in Iran

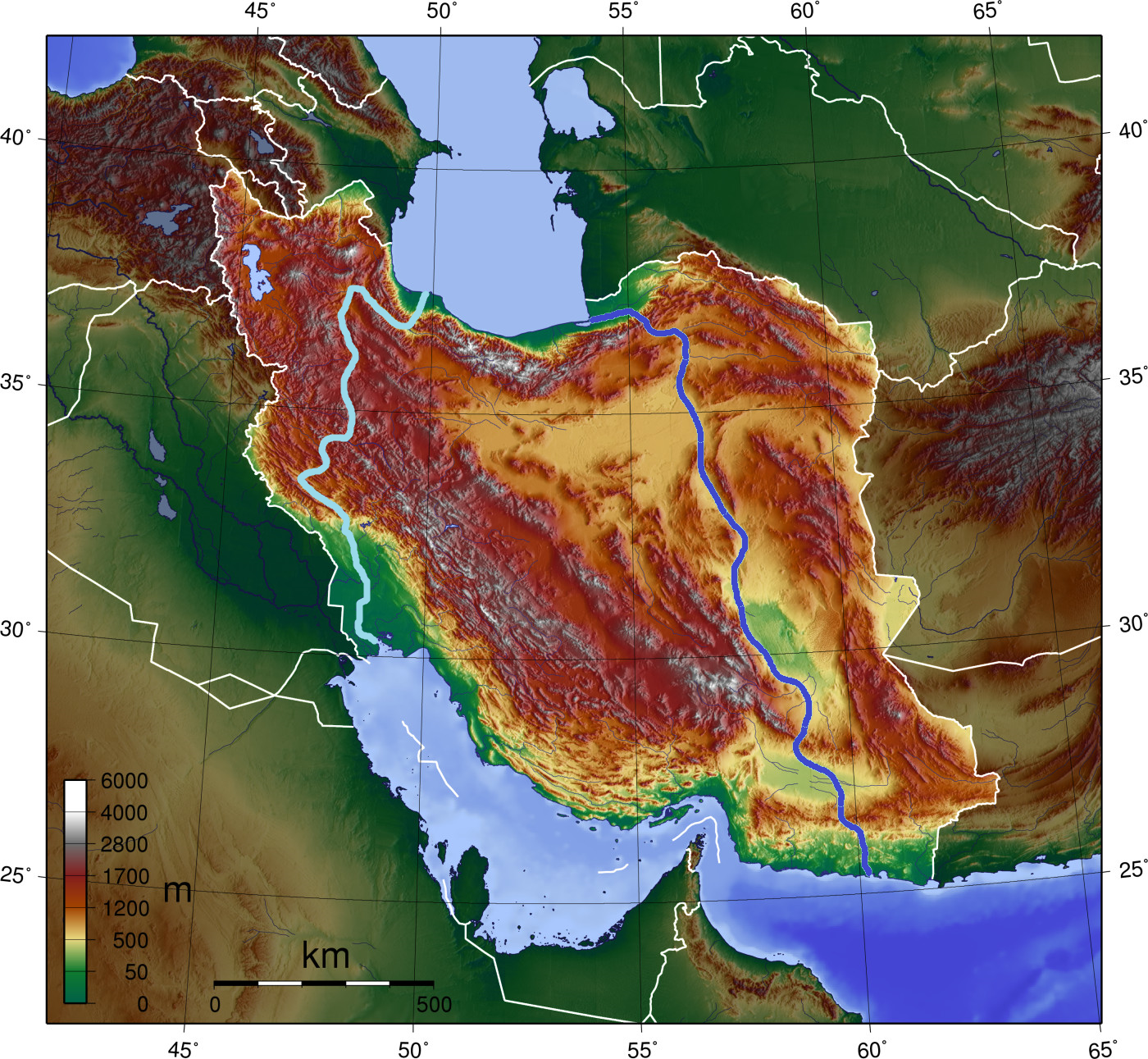
Two suggested routes for Iranrud

Iranrud (Persian: ایران‌رود, lit. 'Iran River') was a plan to build a canal from the Caspian Sea to the Persian Gulf. This concept has existed among some Iranian elites since at least the time of Nasser al-Din Shah Qajar but was first presented as a coherent technical plan by Hooman Farzad in 1966. Experts have since put forth various routes for the construction of this canal. Other proposed variations include a closed canal from the Caspian Sea to the Dasht-e Lut desert (Lut Canal) or connecting the Caspian Sea to Lake Urmia. The defunct Soviet government also showed interest in this project to establish a shorter sea route to countries like China and India, bypassing the Bosphorus, Dardanelles, and Suez Canal, which were controlled by Turkey and Egypt (US allies). While the plan has not been officially launched, it has proponents and opponents.

Supporters of the Iranrud project highlight potential benefits such as increased revenue from the transit of oil, gas, petrochemical products, and other goods from Central Asia to the Persian Gulf. They also anticipate climate improvement in Iran due to precipitation from canal evaporation, a halt to desertification, significant reductions in domestic transportation costs, expansion of fisheries along the canal, and the reclamation of desert lands. Furthermore, the project is seen as providing a unique geopolitical advantage. Conversely, opponents cite the impracticality of the plan due to the Caspian Sea's lower elevation relative to open waters, lack of benefit for northern Iran, the risk of flooding northern lands, challenges in crossing Alborz mountain range, the danger of saltwater intrusion into freshwater sources, and the potential for environmental catastrophe. From the opponents' perspective, objecting to a water transfer project in one of the world's driest and hottest regions, across its vast desert, is justifiable.

There were two different proposals for the route of the canal:

- directly to the Indian Ocean through Dasht-e Lut, or;
- from the Caspian to Lake Urmia and after that to the Persian Gulf.

== History ==
The idea of linking the two coasts via Iranian territory was first introduced in the 19th century. The first professional study was carried out in the 1960s. The first iteration of this plan was written by engineer Hooman Farzad in 1968. According to his plan, some link must be made between the Persian Gulf and the Oman Sea. Three places were suggested: the Hamun-e Jaz Murian basin and two other places in Dasht-e Lut and Dasht-e Kavir. Many years later, the same plan was suggested to Mir-Hossein Mousavi, who was prime minister at that time.

Here's a timeline based on the provided page:

- 1889 (1268 ^{S.H.}): The concept was initially proposed by Russian engineers.
- 1904 (1283 ^{S.H.}): A joint commission involving Iran and Russia was formed to study the project.
- 1908 (1287 ^{S.H.}): Negotiations were suspended due to pressure from Turkey and England.
- 1941 (1320 ^{S.H.}): Turkey disrupted the passage of Russian ships through the Bosphorus and Dardanelles straits, leading Iran and Russia to resume discussions on the waterway project in 1942 (1321 ^{S.H.}).
- 1962 (1341 ^{S.H.}): A commission was established in Iran to study the canal's construction.
- 1973 (1352 ^{S.H.}): An agreement for economic, scientific, and technical cooperation and a memorandum of understanding for mutual investment in the canal's construction were signed.
- 1975 (1354 ^{S.H.}): Iran withdrew from the project to maintain its shared interests with the United States.
- 1995-1997 (1374-1376 ^{S.H.}): Preliminary feasibility studies for the Persian Gulf-Caspian Sea waterway project were carried out by the then-Ministry of Construction Jihad with the participation of 130 Iranian experts. These studies examined a route in the eastern part of the country for a 2070 km canal from the Strait of Hormuz to the Turkmen Gulf. The estimated cost of construction at 1997 prices was about 4400 billion tomans, with a projected completion time of 20 years. These studies emphasized that freshwater resources would be needed to supply the canal.
- 1997 (1376 ^{S.H.}): The United States sanctioned the project to penalize companies intending to invest in the waterway.

Despite this long history and various studies, a report published by the Planning and Budget Organization in 2017 (1396 ^{S.H.}) concluded that the waterway is not justifiable due to issues such as the impossibility of providing freshwater, environmental pollution, high evaporation rates, exorbitant costs, and the availability of more feasible alternatives like pipeline water transfer and dedicated railway construction.

== Routes ==
- The western route: roughly following the shortest air distance between the two coasts, extends over a total length of about 950 km from the northern end of the Persian Gulf to the southwest of the Caspian Sea. The channel would go south in Arvand Rud and Karun (≈300 km), and in the north by Sefid Rud (≈50 km). The mentioned river basin was partially navigable, and it would be necessary to regulate the flow. In the central part, the channel would stretch through a high mountain valley with a length of about 600 km. The main advantages of the western route are the shorter distance between the seas, the passage through the Khuzestan and Guilan lowlands, the partial flow of rivers, the possibility of using more artificial lakes, and easier water supply for the damp climate and numerous watercourses. However, the major disadvantage of this route is the passage through the chains of Zagros and Alborz, especially in the Kurdistan and Hamadan provinces, where the altitude of the route would inevitably need to climb to more than 1800 meters. The Western route was mentioned solely as an option, and no more detailed studies were carried out for it, as specialists give a big advantage to a more flexible eastern route.
- Eastern route: stretches from the shores of the Gulf of Oman to the southeast coast of the Caspian Sea, totaling between 1465 and 1600 km. This passage was first proposed by engineer Farzad in 1966, and it provides for channeling through the depression of Hamun-e Jaz Murian, Dašt-e Lut and Dašt-e Kavira. By the late 1990s, Iranian engineers for the ultimate southern destination had planned the area of Bandar Abas, more specifically the Minab Valley, and then the route shifted eastward to the Macau valleys of the Kašan River in Džaskanski or Kahir in Čabaharský okrug. The Russian experts, in the 2000s, independent of the Iranian ones, elaborated preliminary plans for the massive transitional channel, and they also saw Bandar Abas as the terminus. The valleys of both of these rivers intersect Bašakerd's mass and lead to Hamun-e Jaz Murian, the southernmost part of the Iranska plateau or depression whose eastern and northern boundary zones are foreseen for the route is about 600 m n. v. The channel would pass through the area around Iranhahera, and one of its important sources of supply would be the Bampur River.

== See also ==
- International North–South Transport Corridor
- Eurasia Canal
- Iranian plateau
- Lake Urmia
