= Hamoon Jazmourian Basin =

Drainage basin in Iran

Hamoon Jazmourian Basin (Persian: حوضه آبریز هامون جازموریان) is a Endorheic basin of Iran. In the classification of basins in Iran, it is considered a sub-basin and is a subset of the Central Plateau Basin. The area of this basin is 69,390 square kilometers and the rivers and canals of this basin enter Hamoon Jazmourian Lake.

Location of Hamoon Jazmourian catchment

== Geography ==
Hamoon Jazmourian Basin is located in the provinces of Sistan and Baluchestan and Kerman. Its main rivers are Bampur and Halilrud. Geological research has shown that the basin has been blocked recently and in the past, its rivers have flowed into the Oman Sea.

The fold of the earth has caused a hole in the basin and the water of the lake penetrates the ground due to the presence of sandy bedrock and rubble. The main heights of this basin consist of the Jabal Barez Mountains and Shah Mountain in the north and Bashagerd Mountain in the south. Jazmourian Basin has a desert climate, and its rainfall system is Mediterranean with predominant winter rainfall. Due to the lack of vegetation, rainfall in this basin leads to floods and severe soil erosion.
