= Dalfard =

Dalfard is a major resort for the citizens of Jiroft, in the Kermān Province of Iran. It is located 30 km north of Jiroft in the Jabalbarz mountains. Jiroft is located in a vast plain, Halil River, on the southern outskirts of the Jebal Barez mountain chain, surrounded by two rivers. One of Dalfard's main attractions is Golm, a series of waterfalls.

In addition to the series of waterfalls called Golm, Dalfard also has Armins resort that includes luxurious villas for tourists and a convenient restaurant that serves traditional as well as western dishes. The people of this region are very warm and friendly. This is a primarily agrarian society and all there are numerous crops which are all organic. The terrain in mountainous and rough but there is one major highway that runs through Dalfard. This beautiful location is three hours from Kerman and four hours from Bandar Abbass. Dalfard is a great place for hikers, nature lovers, hunters, archeologists, historians and families.
