= Konar Sandal, Iran =

Konar Sandal كنارصندل
- Village
- Location within Iran
- Coordinates: 28°27′32″N 57°46′56″E
- Country: Iran
- Province: Kerman
- County: Jiroft
- Bakhsh: Esmaili
- Rural District: Hoseynabad

Population (2006)
  - Total: 1,044
- Time zone: UTC+3:30 (IRST)
  - Summer (DST): UTC+4:30 (IRDT)

Konar Sandal (Persian: كنارصندل, also Romanized as Konār Şandal, Kenar Sandal, and Konār-e Şandal; also known as Kunār Sandal and Tump-i-Kunār Sandal) is a village in Hoseynabad Rural District, Esmaili District, Jiroft County, Kerman Province, Iran. At the 2006 census, its population was 1,044, in 209 families.

== Archaeology ==
Located nearby is Konar Sandal, a Bronze Age archaeological site. It consists of two mounds a few kilometers apart called Konar Sandal A and B, as well as several other smaller sites. They were discovered in the early 2000s. These sites are associated with Jiroft culture of the 3rd millennium BC.
