= Jiroft University of Medical Sciences =

University in Jiroft, Iran

- دانشگاه علوم پزشکی و خدمات بهداشتی درمانی جیرفت
- Established: 1988
- Chancellor: Dr. Ali Asghar Kheirkhah
- Students: 800
- Location: Jiroft, Iran
- Website: jmu.ac.ir

Jiroft University of Medical Sciences is a medical sciences university in Jiroft, Kerman, Iran. The university has four schools including medicine, health, para-medicine, and nursing & midwifery.
