= Barez =

Barez (Persian: بارز) may refer to:

- Jebal Barez, a mountain range of Kerman Province, Iran
- Barez Rural District, an administrative division of Chaharmahal and Bakhtiari Province, Iran
