= Ancient City Seals =

Ancient Mesopotamian administrative system

At the end of the Uruk period in the ancient Near East c. 3100 BC there was a widespread re-alignment and reformulation of power structure in the ancient Near East entering the following Jemdet Nasr period, also called the Uruk III period (c. 3100–2900 BC). Based on recovered "city seals", primarily from Jemdat Nasr, it is thought that a consortium of twenty cities engaged in a trading system built around the primary Uruk female deity. In the Early Dynastic I period (c. 2900–2700 BC) another political re-alignment occurred, though restricted primarily to Mesopotamia. A standard list of cities found on clay sealings led to the proposal that there was an Early Dynastic I period "Kengir League" of cities centered around Nippur which encompassed a joint trading system with an underlying religious basis (centered on the chief god Enlil), similar in nature to the later bala taxation system. Uruk has also been proposed as the central city. While the concept has received support there is debate about how closely and in what way the cities were bound. It has been proposed that the seals were part of a progression, a cultic journey, of the main female deity's cult statue from Uruk through the other cities of Southern Mesopotamia.

== Uruk III period ==
Sealings with "city seals" from the Uruk III period (c. 3100–2900 BC), were found at Jemdet Nasr. Subsequently another, illicitly excavated, tablet was identified as coming from Tell Uqair (ancient Urum) bearing the same seal at those from Jemdet Nasr. A single sealing, used to seal a door, was also found at Uruk. Altogether there are seventeen sealed tablets from Jemdet Nasr and one from Tell Uqair. Thirteen of the Jemdet Nasr tablets were analyzed with portable X-ray fluorescence and should to be from a single archive. All contain similar quantities of "figs, apples,wine (or grapes/raisins), and a certain fish product". The seal in question is in two registers and thought to have originally had twenty signs. Of these the only certain identification is for, all on the top register, Ur, Larsa, Zabalam, Urum, and BU.BU.NA_{2}. An alternative reading of the known cities is Ur, Larsa, Nippur, Uruk, Keš, Zabala, and, Ku’ara. It has been proposed that these seals were an earlier version centered around Uruk, (which in that period reached a size of 600 hectares versus 21 hectares for Ur), of the Early Dynastic I "Kengir League" city seals. It has been proposed that the system represented by these seals supported the cult of a Uruk III female deity, possible Inanna, similarly to the role of Enlil in the later Kengir League.

On texts from the Uruk III / Jemdet Nasr period there are lexical lists which list cities in a standard order. These cities include Ur, Nippur, Larsa, and Uruk.

== Kengir League – Early Dynastic I period ==
It has been proposed that there was an Early Dynastic I period Kengir League (Kengir is proposed for an ancient term for Nippur) of cities centered around Nippur which encompassed a joint trading system with an underlying religious basis (centered on the chief god Enlil), similar in nature to the later bala taxation system. Uruk has also been proposed as the central city as has Ur (due to the majority of the seals being found there) centered on the god Nanna. Also referred to as a City League and a Hexapolis. While the concept has received support there is debate about how closely and in what way the cities were bound. Also referred to as the City League. The initial basis for positing a league of cities was a group of clay sealings, mostly from doors but including a few from containers, found at ancient Ur in the 1920s. Thirteen seals were found at Shuruppak. A single exemplar, a door sealing, was found at Konar Sandal South. They date to the Early Dynastic I period (c. 2900–2700 BC). Each seal was inscribed with a list of major Sumerian cites. Cities on the seals include the cities Ur, Eridu, Larsa, Uruk, Adab, Nippur, Kesh, and the unidentified cities Ur_{2} (possibly Der), UB, and Edinnu. A similar sealing was found at that time at Uruk. The seals of the cities were combined with the pictograph for pedestal and the sign for the patron god of that city including "B(èš)-utu (sanctuary of (the sun god) Utu/Shamash) for the city of Larsa, AB(èš)-ùri (sanctuary of (the moon god) Nanna) for Ur and AB(èš)-mùš(sanctuary of (the goddess) Ishtar) for Zabalam". Similar to those from the earlier Uruk III period, lexical lists from the Early Dynastic IIIa period, found at Shuruppak, Ebla, and Abu Salabikh, contain city lists in the same format as the ED I city seals. The list from Abu Salabikh reads "Uruk, Adab, Nippur, Lagash, Shurappak, Gissa" and is broken after that. The Elba tablet reads "Uruk, Adab, Nippur, Lagash, Shurappak, Gissa, Elam, Dilmun ... a number of yet identified cites". This order is echoed in the list order of militia-men, "gurus of Kengi (ki.en-gi)".

== See also ==
- Cities of the ancient Near East
- Hanseatic League
- Zame Hymns
