= Yusef Majidzadeh =

Iranian archaeologist (1936–2026)

Yousef Majidzadeh
- یوسف مجیدزاده
- Born: 1936; Tabriz, Iran
- Died: 19 October 2026 (aged 90); France
- Occupation: Archaeologist

Yousef Majidzadeh (Persian: یوسف مجیدزاده; 1936 – 19 October 2026) was an Iranian archaeologist and director of the excavations at Ozbaki, Qabristan and Jiroft. He was a native of Tabriz.

In 2007, Majidzadeh presented a seminar in Kerman entitled “Jiroft, the Cradle of Oriental Civilization”. During the lecture, he said: "The history of civilization in Jiroft dates back to 2700 BCE and the third-millennium civilization is the missing link of the chain of civilization which archaeologists have long sought." He also stated "We do not deny the Mesopotamian civilization, but we believe that the Jiroft culture is of equal importance to the Mesopotamian. The only difference is that the Mesopotamian civilization had cultural continuity while the Jiroft civilization suffered from ups and downs for natural reasons. Thus it emerged in a certain period and was buried at a later time."

He retired from University of Tehran after Iranian Revolution and lived in France. Yousef Majidzadeh' died on 19 October 2026, at the age of 90.

== Selected bibliography ==
- Majidzadeh, Y. 1977. Excavation in Tepe Qabrestan: The First Two Seasons 1970 and 1971. Marlik 2:45-61.
- Majidzadeh, Y. 1982. Lapis lazuli and the Great Khorasan road. Paléorient, 8/1: 59-69
- Alizadeh, Abbas, Y. Majidzadeh, and S. Malek Shahmirzadi, eds. 1999 The Iranian World: Essays on Iranian Art and Archaeology presented to Ezat O. Negahban. Tehran, Iran, University Press.
- Madjidzadeh, Y., 2003 Jiroft: The Earliest Oriental Civilization, Tehran,
- Madjidzadeh, Y., 2003 “La découverte de Jiroft,” Dossiers d’Archeologie, no. 287, pp. 19–26
