= Biosphere reserves of Iran =

Iranian biosphere reserves

UNESCO Biosphere Reserves in Iran

The biosphere reserves of Iran have a total land area of 1.64 million km^{2}. They support more than 8,000 recorded species of plants (almost 2,421 are endemic), 502 species of birds, 164 species of mammals, 209 species of reptiles, and 375 species of butterflies.

Iran has taken many steps to protect its natural resources, biodiversity, and landscapes. The country has established national parks, natural monuments, wildlife sanctuaries, and protected areas.

== List ==
- Arasbaran, 1976
- Arjan Protected Area and Lake Parishan, 1976
- Geno, 1976
- Golestan, 1976
- Hara, 1976
- Kavir, 1977
- Lake Oromeeh, 1976
- Miankaleh, 1976
- Touran, 1976
- Dena, 2010
- Tang-e-Sayad & Sabzkuh, 2015
- Hamoun, 2016
- Kopet Dag, 2018

== See also ==
- Geography of Iran
- Iranian Plateau
- List of national parks and protected areas of Iran
