= Jiroft =

City in Kerman province, Iran

Jiroft Persian: جیرفت
- City
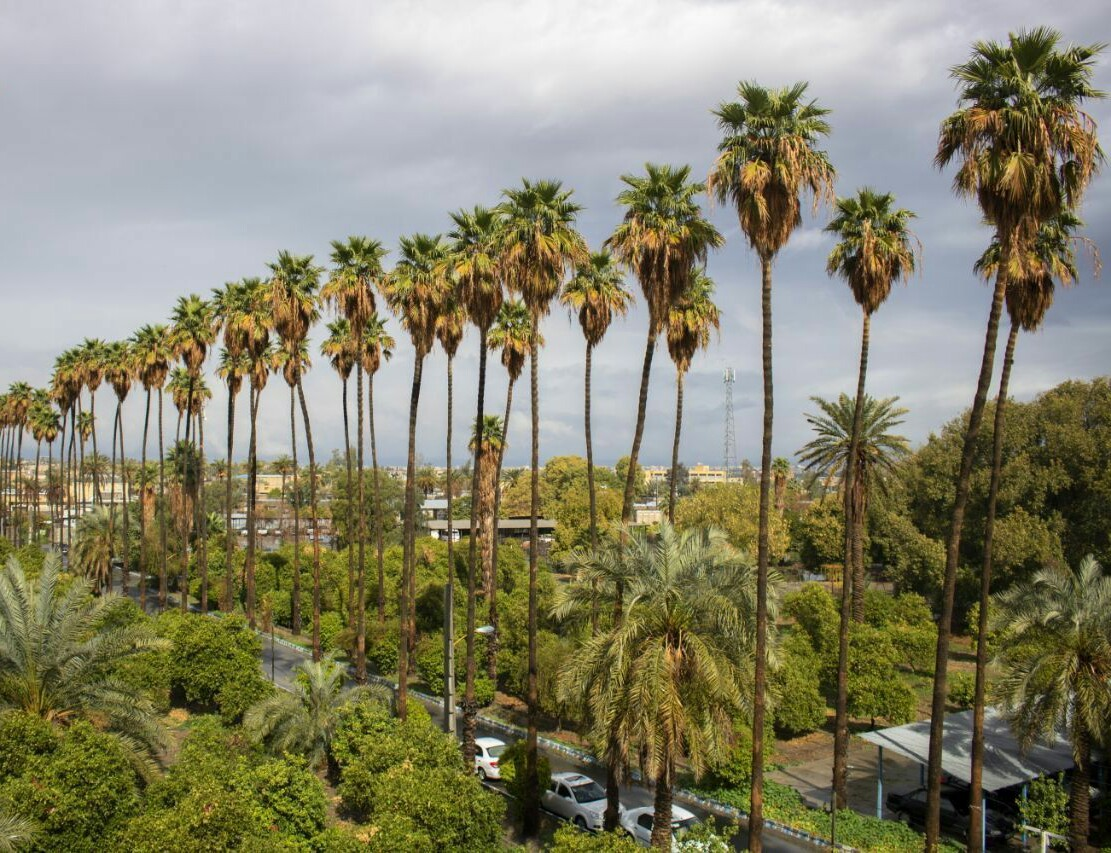

- Location within Iran
- Coordinates: 28°40′47″N 57°44′41″E
- Country: Iran
- Province: Kerman
- County: Jiroft
- District: Central

Government
  - Mayor: Hadi Rabbani

Population (2016)
  - Urban: 130,429
- Time zone: UTC+3:30 (IRST)

Jiroft (Persian: جیرفت; [dʒiːˈɾoft]) (Note: Also romanized as Jīroft; formerly, Sabzāwārān, Sabzevārān, Sabzevārān-e Jiroft, and Sabzvārān) is a city in the Central District of Jiroft County, Kerman province, Iran, serving as capital of both the county and the district. It is 230 kilometres (140 mi) south of the city of Kerman, and 1,375 kilometres (854 mi) south of Tehran along Road 91.

In the past it was also called Sabzevaran, and on account of its being very fertile land it is famous as Hend-e-Koochak (the little India). The early Bronze Age civilization found in Jiroft County is one of the oldest human civilizations (according to some, the oldest) and the script found there may antedate the cuneiform discovered in Mesopotamia.

== Demographics ==
=== Language ===
The local language of Jiroft is Jirofti, a dialect of Garmsiri, an Iranian language. Garmsiri is a continuum of closely related dialects extending from the Halilrud river valley in the north down to the Strait of Hormuz in the south.

=== Population ===
At the time of the 2006 National Census, the city's population was 95,031 in 19,926 households. The following census in 2011 counted 111,034 people in 25,589 households. The 2016 census measured the population of the city as 130,429 people in 39,855 households.

== Geography ==
Jiroft lies in an alluvial plain of the Halil River, on the southern outskirts of the Jebal Barez mountain chain. It sits in a tectonically active basin, at the northern end of the Bandar Abbas-Jiroft fault zone, with both structural and anthropogenic subsidence occurring. Two intermittent streams join the Halil in Jiroft, the larger is the Melenti River. The mean elevation of the city is about 650 metres (2,130 ft) above sea level. It has a hot desert climate (Köppen climate type: BWh). The weather in the city is sweltering in summer – it is one of the hottest places in Iran – but temperatures are moderate in winter.

There is a large dam (Jiroft Dam) upstream the city (40 km North-East of Jiroft) on the Halil River. It has been operational since 1992, With a reservoir of more than 410 million cubic meters of water it irrigates 14,200 hectares of land downstream and generates electricity. However, uncontrolled groundwater pumping has lowered the water table and caused increased subsidence.

The Melenti River bed was originally eighty to ninety meters wide, but due to construction of buildings and the dumping of waste it had constricted to under twenty meters. In 2024 this resulted in extreme flooding in Jiroft and fifteen people lost their lives. Neither the City nor the Water Authority had undertaken any maintenance or regulatory authority even though the problems had been noted in a detailed 1999 report.

=== Climate ===
Jiroft has a hot desert climate (BWh) in the Köppen climate classification.

Climate data for Mian Deh, Jiroft (elevation: 601 m (1,972 ft), 1989-2009 normals)
Month	Jan	Feb	Mar	Apr	May	Jun	Jul	Aug	Sep	Oct	Nov	Dec	Year
Daily mean °C (°F)	12.7 (54.9)	15.7 (60.3)	19.5 (67.1)	25.3 (77.5)	30.7 (87.3)	34.4 (93.9)	35.7 (96.3)	34.6 (94.3)	31.4 (88.5)	26.1 (79.0)	19.9 (67.8)	14.9 (58.8)	25.1 (77.1)
Average precipitation mm (inches)	42.6 (1.68)	39.1 (1.54)	41.3 (1.63)	6.6 (0.26)	3.0 (0.12)	1.9 (0.07)	1.1 (0.04)	1.5 (0.06)	1.4 (0.06)	4.7 (0.19)	5.3 (0.21)	27.7 (1.09)	176.2 (6.95)
Average relative humidity (%)	62	58	51	39	31	30	35	36	38	36	45	56	43
Source: Iran Meteorological Organization

== History ==
=== Jiroft culture ===
A Jiroft culture has been postulated as an early Bronze Age (third millennium BC) archaeological culture, located in the territory of present-day Sistan and Kermān Provinces of Iran. The hypothesis is based on a collection of artifacts that were confiscated in Iran and accepted by many to have derived from the Jiroft area in south central Iran, reported by online Iranian news services, beginning in 2001.

The proposed type site is Konar Sandal, near Jiroft in the Halil River area. Other significant sites associated with the culture include; Shahr-e Sukhteh (Burnt City), Tepe Bampur, Espiedej, Shahdad, Tal-i-Iblis and Tepe Yahya.

=== Recent finds ===
A report from Iran states that the Halil Rud region near "Jiroft became famous between 2002/2003 [when news of] thousands of confiscated burial goods, especially elaborated carved chlorite vessels from the necropolises of Halil Rud" were released to public.

Since February 2003, archaeologists have recovered a wealth of artifacts from the necropolis which they had named Mahtoutabad. For example, one grave contained "animal bones and food offerings, ceramics, and stone and copper items ... [indicating] a coherent cultural and chronological framework, around 2400–2200 BC".

Two nearby mounds were also excavated, named Konar Sandal South and North. A 2013 research paper about the South mound states that work during 2006 to 2009 "revealed the remains of three successive settlements dating to the fourth millennium BC".

Excavation re-commenced in 2014 and revealed art works of "complexity and beauty" and artifacts that proved that the society had several writing systems. According to National Geographic, the content of the mounds is significant:

They turned out to contain the remains of two major architectural complexes. The northern mound included a cult building, while in the southern one were the remains of a fortified citadel. At the foot of the mounds, buried under many feet of sediment, were the remains of smaller buildings. It’s believed that the two mounds had once formed part of a unified urban settlement that stretched many miles across the plateau ... [artifacts] "have been dated to between 2500 and 2200 B.C. [They are said to be evidence of] the "development of a complex civilization".

=== Modern history ===
In 2024 extensive land fraud in the transfer of state lands was discovered. More than eighty parcels had been transferred or occupied without proper authority. Value of the properties eceeded 9,400 billion rials (US$220 million).

== Transportation ==
Jiroft is served by Jiroft Airport, located several kilometres to the northwest.

== Gallery ==
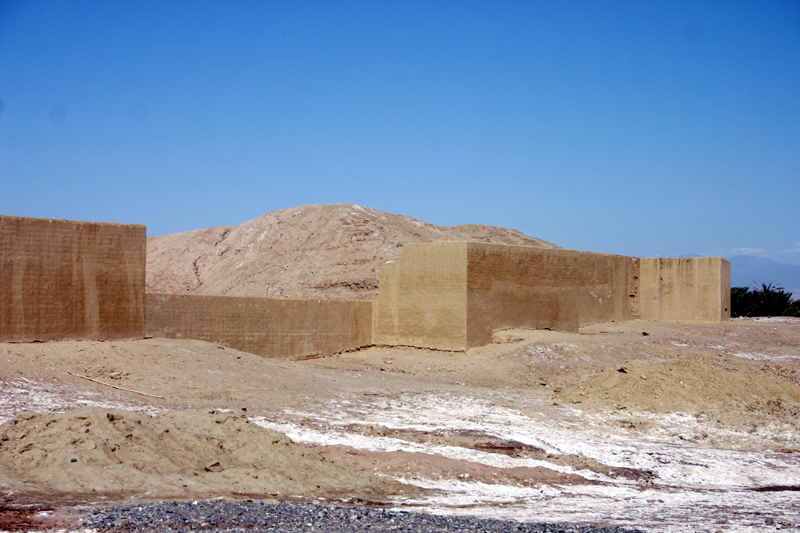
Ruins in Jiroft County.

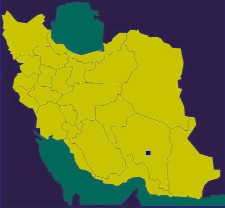
Map of Iran, showing location of Jiroft.

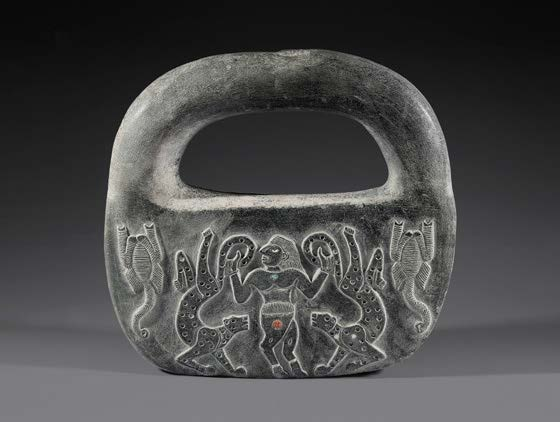
Master of animals in chlorite, Jiroft, Kerman ca. 2500 BC, Bronze Age I, National Museum of Iran

== See also ==
- Dalfard
- Media related to Jiroft at Wikimedia Commons
