= Puzrish-Dagan =

Archaeological site in Iraq

- Location within Iraq Location within Near East
- 32°03′29″N 45°17′20″E
- Type: archaeological site, human settlement
- Periods: Early Dynastic period, Akkad period, Ur III period
- Location: Iraq
- Region: Al-Qādisiyyah Governorate

History
- Built by: Shulgi

Site notes
- Height: 8.5 metre
- Area: 10 hectare (unknown), 15 hectare (unknown)
- Excavation dates: 2007
- Archaeologists: Ali Ubeid Shalkam

Puzrish-Dagan (modern Drehem) (Tall ad-Duraihim) is an important archaeological site in Al-Qādisiyyah Governorate (Iraq). It is best known for the thousands of clay tablets dating from the Ur III period (21st century BC), that are known to have come from the site through looting during the early twentieth century.

== History of research ==
Puzrish-Dagan came first to the attention of scholars when clay tablets coming from illicit excavations on the site started to appear on the antiquities market in 1909–1910. Based on information from the antiquities traders who sold the tablets, Puzrish-Dagan could be identied with modern Drehem in Iraq. Since then, some 12,000 tablets thought to have come from the site have been published. The objects are scattered across numerous collections, for example those of the Royal Ontario Museum, the Institute for the Study of Ancient Cultures, Harvard Museum, and the Iraq Museum. Stephen Herbert Langdon briefly excavated there in 1924.

The site was surveyed by Robert McCormick Adams as part of his important archaeological work in the region. Iraqi archaeologists excavated the site in 2007 under the direction of Ali Ubeid Shalkam. The Iraqi-Italian QADIS-project surveyed the site in 2016. From 2016 to 2019 the University of Bologna and the Iraqi State Board of Antiquities and Heritage conducted a program of coordinated remote sensing and surface surveys in the Qadisiyah province, including at Drehem. It determined that the site had an extent of 60 hectares. It determined that the city was surrounded by canals, was laid out as an urban grid, had a number of administrative building, and had a harbor.

The Institute for the Study of Ancient Cultures has received permission to start new excavations at the site as part of their renewed work at the nearby site of Nippur and carried out a preliminary survey in 2019.

== The site and its environment ==
Puzrish-Dagan is located some 10 kilometres (6.2 mi) southeast of Nippur, of which it has sometimes been called a suburb. The site consists of two areas: a northern and a southern mound. The northern mound measures 380 by 240 by 4 metres (1,247 by 787 by 13 ft) for a total area of 10 hectares (25 acres). The southern mound is slightly larger: it measures 560 by 275 metres (1,837 by 902 ft), is 8.5 metres (28 ft) high and occupies an area of 15 hectares (37 acres). Recent remote sensing research suggests the maximum extent was about 80 hectares. Parts of the site are now obscured by modern agricultural fields and several irrigation canals cut through it. The mound has been described as a "beehive" due to the illegal looting taking place since the early 1900s.

Based on the site morphology, the southern mound possibly contains a ziggurat. Both mounds probably contain large buildings over 100 metres (330 ft) in length. Traces of the walls are still visible on the surface, and the regularity of these traces suggests that the buildings were planned and built within a short period. The QADIS survey has documented possible traces of a city wall, a large temple complex next to the ziggurat, ancient canals that ran alongside and through the settlement, as well as a harbor.

== Occupation history ==
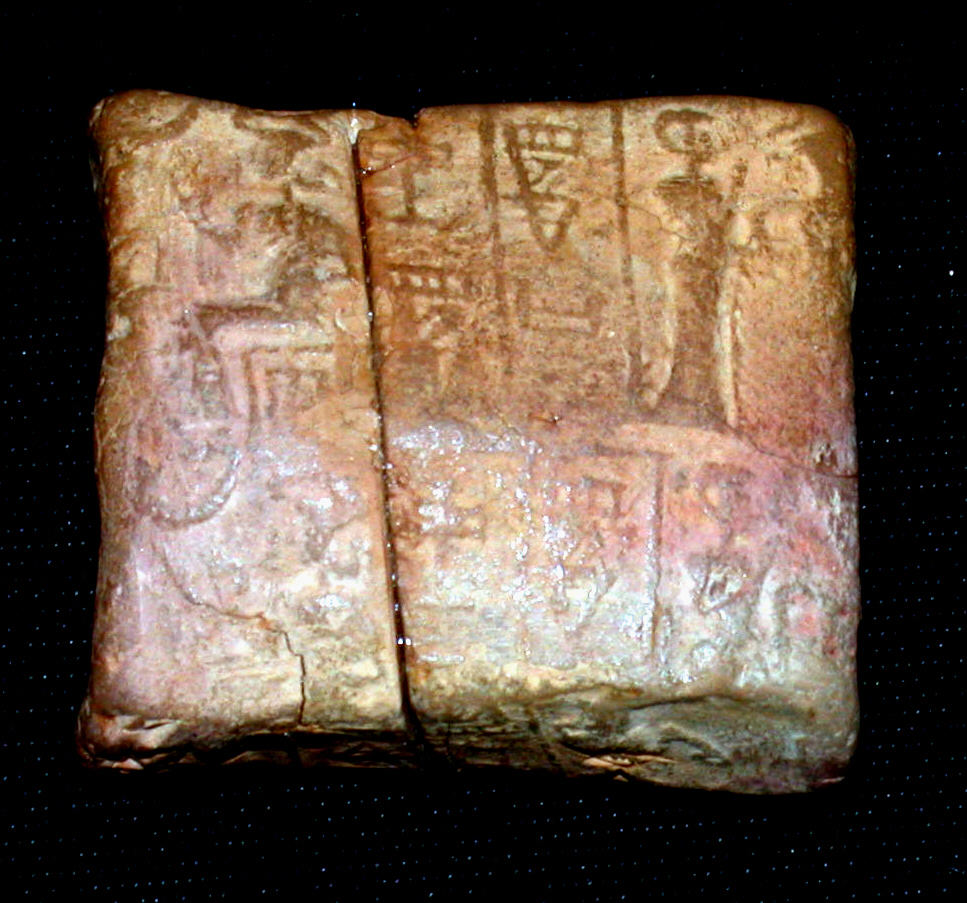
Cuneiform tablet case impressed with cylinder seal, for cuneiform tablet 86.11.249a- receipt of a kid MET VS86 11 249B

Traces of the Early Dynastic, Akkadian and Ur III periods have been found at the site according to a 1967 publication of the Iraqi Directorate General of antiquities. The QADIS-survey found sherds dating to the Middle Uruk period and confirmed that the Ur III period was probably the most important settlement level at Drehem. Evidence for the Isin-Larsa as well as the Parthian and/or Sasanian periods has also been found. The thousands of texts coming from the site all date to the Ur III period. In the absence of excavations, these texts provide the most information on the nature of the settlement at Drehem. Puzrish-Dagan was founded by King Shulgi as an important administrative center in the bala tax system of the Ur III period. Year name 39 of Shulgi was "The year Šulgi, king of Ur, king of the four quarters, built é-Puzriš-Dagan, a residence {palace? temple?} of Šulgi", though Drehem texts are known to start as far back as Shulgi year 26. Texts between S26 and S39 are referred to as "Early Drehem Series". The following two year names also marked this same event, which is generally treated as the founding of Puzriš-Dagan.

== The Archives ==
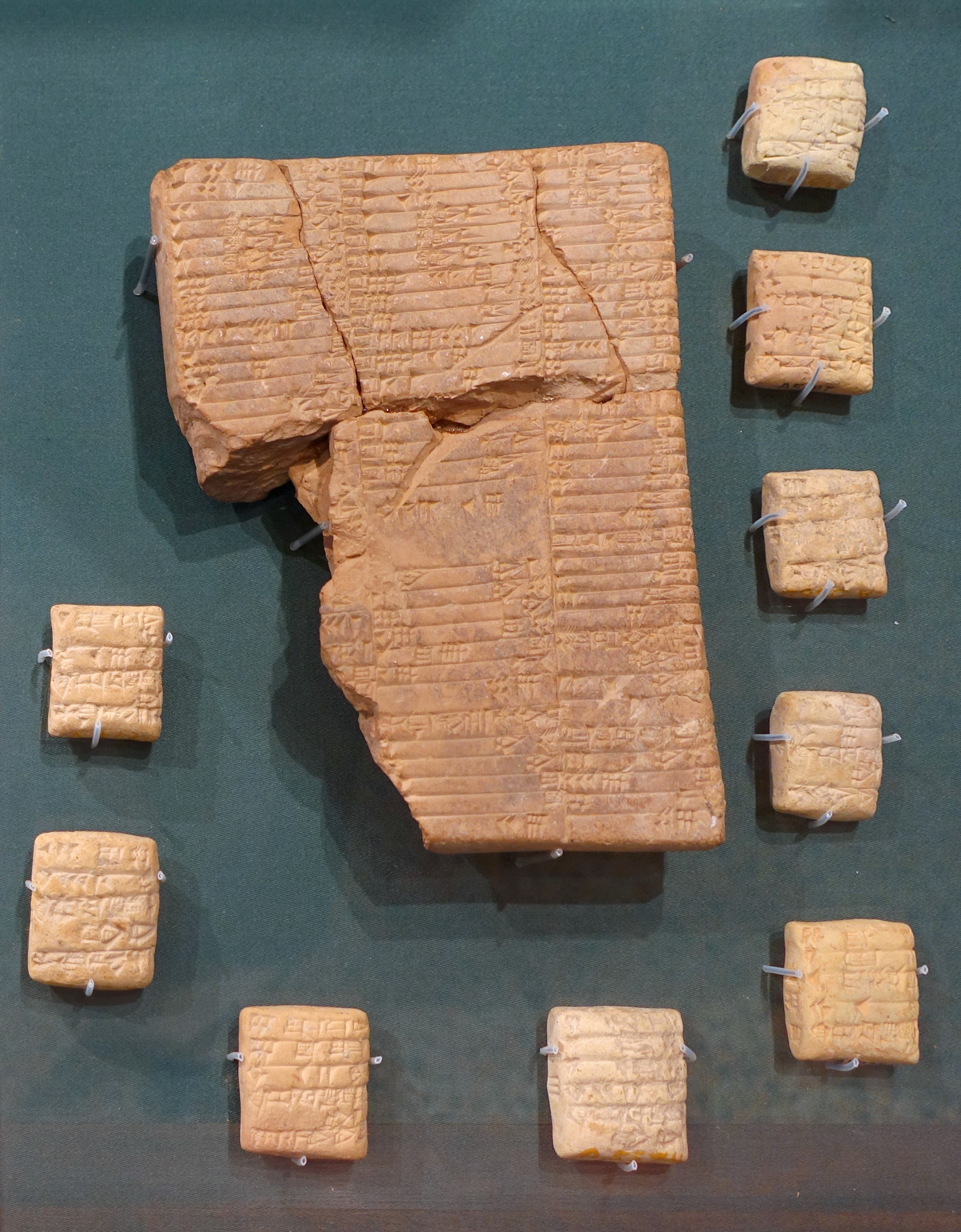
Large inventory tablet and some of the smaller daily management tablets whose information it centralizes, on the movement of animals. Puzrish-Dagan, reign of Amar-Sin (5th year). Museum of the Oriental Institute of Chicago.

A recent assessment (2016) by M. Molina identifies 15,647 tablets that were certainly or very likely unearthed at Drehem. They are essentially the result of clandestine excavations from the early 20th century, but the site was again subject to illegal excavations during the period of unrest linked to the two Gulf Wars of 1991 and 2003. The tablets span a period from the 29th year of Shulgi's reign to the 2nd year of Ibbi-Sin's reign, a span of about thirty years. They are mostly dated to the reign of Amar-Sin.

The majority of the tablets come from an office managing livestock movements over a period of 26 years (Shulgi 43 to Ibbi-Sin 2). Many are short documents recording the receipt and delivery of animals. These animals originated from donations by the royal family and high-ranking officials of the kingdom, from taxes, and from spoils of war. Some were sent directly to temples where they were sacrificed, while others were transferred and kept at a site, awaiting use in worship, or to feed priests, state officials and dependents, often as rations, or to feed dogs in public kennels. According to tablets recording the transfer of animals over a year, Amar-Sîn 5, the office recorded over this period the movements of 5,700 cattle, 750 equines, 900 wild animals (mainly gazelles), and 70,000 sheep and goats. The overall organization of this structure is debated, with many points remaining unclear. Whether these animals actually passed through the site or were slaughtered there is a matter of discussion. The most common view, since the discovery of the first tablets, presents Puzrish-Dagan as a sort of gigantic cattleyard. However, this is not certain. The documentation primarily indicates the presence of an administrative center managing animal transfers. This organization seems to have been divided into several offices, perhaps organized around a 'central office,' with officials and scribes responsible for writing general accounts. It also seems that this organization had 'branches' in other cities, particularly Ur and Nippur. The texts also show that Puzrish-Dagan contained, in connection with animals: slaughterhouses, kitchens, and hide processing workshops.

It is at least certain that Puzrish-Dagan was not used solely as a cattle pen, since other archives, much less extensive than the previous one, have been found:

- the 'Treasury archive' (Shulgi 36 to Shu-Sîn 9), which records the export of precious metals (gold and silver) and luxury tableware produced from these materials;
- the 'Shoe archive' (Shulgi 32 to Ibbi-Sîn 3), which documents the manufacture of high-quality shoes in royal workshops, using some of the hides from locally slaughtered cattle;
- another, composite archive, sometimes called the 'Early Drehem Series' because it dates from the early occupation of the site (Shulgi 26 to 39), includes the archive of Shulgi's wife, Shulgi-simti, who managed a sort of pious foundation organizing sacrificial offerings to temples.

This last archive seems to indicate that the city was initially named Esagdana Nibru, and, along with the other secondary archives, it indicates that the site served as a minor administrative center before Shulgi undertook to develop it into a major one during his 39th, 40th, and 41st regnal years. It was after this period that the central archive managing the flow of animals began to operate. The nature of this project remains undetermined until the exact function of Puzrish-Dagan is clearly identified. It certainly contained livestock pens and employed herdsmen and herding officials, but also slaughterhouses, leather workshops, and kitchens. Is Shulgi, in fact, commemorating the construction of this administrative center through his year names? It is also possible that the king built a temple and/or a palace in Puzrish-Dagan. The region of Nippur, along with the neighboring city of Tummal, often served as a royal residence during this period, more so than the city of Ur. Puzrish-Dagan seems destined to complement this organization, perhaps with a more administrative and utilitarian function.

== See also ==
- Cities of the ancient Near East
