= Hamun-e Jaz Murian =

- Location within Iran
- Coordinates: 27.4908°N 58.5461°E
- Type: Seasonal salt (hypersaline) lake
- Primary inflows: Bampur River, Halil River
- Primary outflows: none: all water entering the lake is lost through evaporation
- Basin countries: Iran
- Surface area: 3,300 km^{2} (1,300 sq mi)

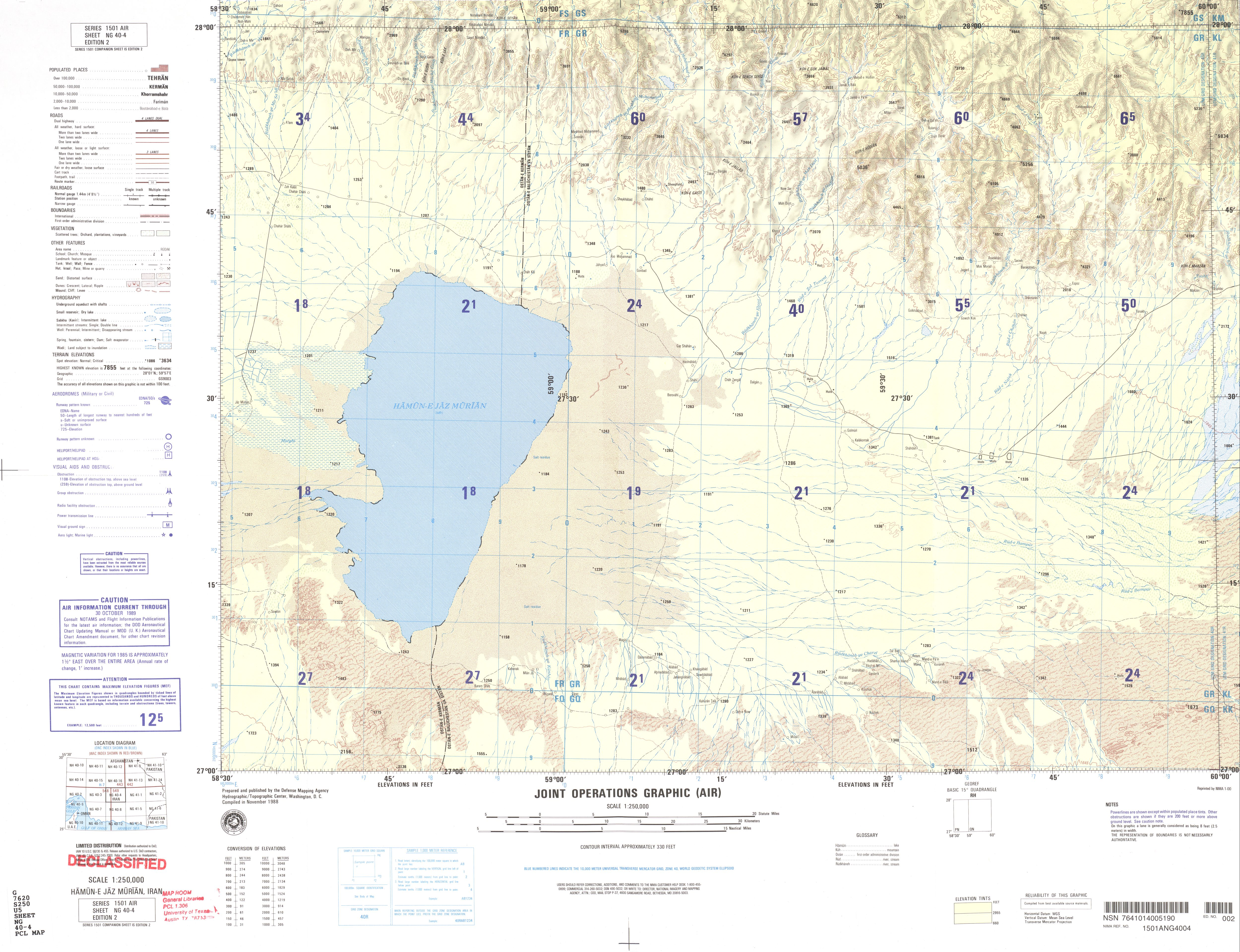
Map of the Jaz Murian region

Hamun-e Jaz Murian (Persian: هامون جازموریان) is an inland basin or depression in southeast Iran, straddling the provinces of Kerman and Sistan-Baluchistan. The area of Hamoon and Jazmourian basin stretches to 69,600 square kilometers, with the western part of 35,600 square kilometers in Kerman province and the eastern part of 34,000 square kilometers in Sistan-Baluchestan province.

The Jazmurian Wetland is located in an endorheic basin at the southern edge of the Dasht-e-Lut. Several factors such as high evaporation, overexploitation of groundwater, dam construction on the rivers feeding the wetland, and the effect of drought and climate changes have caused this wetland to dry out during the recent years.

== Geography ==
At the center of the basin is a "seasonal lake," or hamun. The lake can remain almost totally dry during dry years, while in wetter years it can have water year around.

Jaz Murian is an oblong shape, east to west, surrounded by high mountain ranges reaching peaks in excess of 6500 feet (2000 m). The lowest elevations are to the extreme west of the basin towards the towns of Kahnuj and Minab. Two principal rivers flow into the basin: from the west, the Halil Rud, and from the east, the Bampur River . However, neither river brings much water to the central parts of the basin to feed the lake, as their waters are largely or totally removed for agriculture on the way. After Jiroft Dam was built on the Halil Rud and went under operation in 1992, the perennial river at the downstream did not receive its environmental flow and appeared as an ephemeral river since then, this affected the Jaz Murian seriously.

== Cultural importance ==
In the scriptures of the Zoroastrian religion, the basin has a holy character, similar to that of Hamun-e Helmand. These scriptures call the basin by its Middle Persian name, "Chitro Mêyân." The theory that the Jaz Murian basin was repaired or even constructed by Chandragupta Maurya was proposed by the Armenian Indologist Seth. His theory was based on the linguistic resemblance between the name of the lake, "Jaz Murian", and the Pali word "Moriya" (written as "Muriya" in Prakrit), as well as the discovery of a large Buddhist sanctuary at 'Koh-i-Khwaja' in the Sistan region. However, this view has not been supported or accepted by later historians.
