= Kuh-e Shah =

Mountain in Iran

- Laleh zar
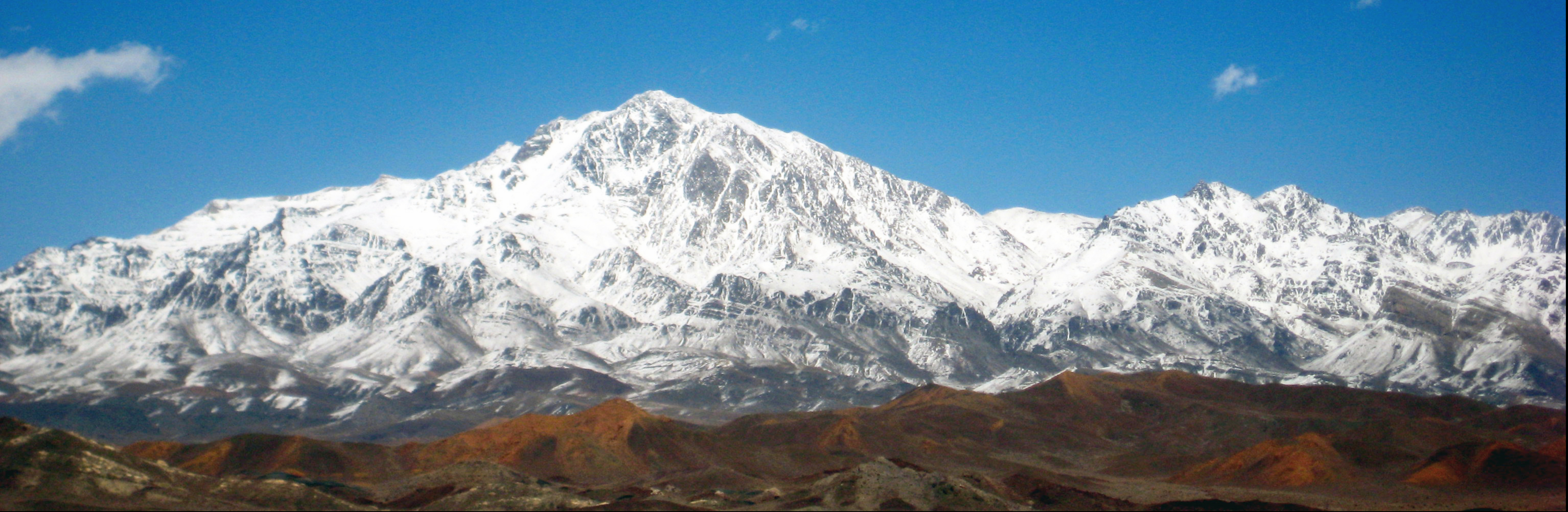

Highest point
- Elevation: 4,384 m (14,383 ft)
- Coordinates: 29°23′24.2″N 56°44′48.8″E

Geography
- Location within Iran
- Location: Kerman, Iran
- Parent range: central Iranian mountain range

Kūh-e Shah (Persian: کوه شاه; also:Laleh zar) The king Mountain is a mountain in the central Iranian mountain range in the south east of Iran, in Kerman Province. It is located in the Baft county of the Kerman Province. Elevation of this mountain is 4,384 meters at the peak.

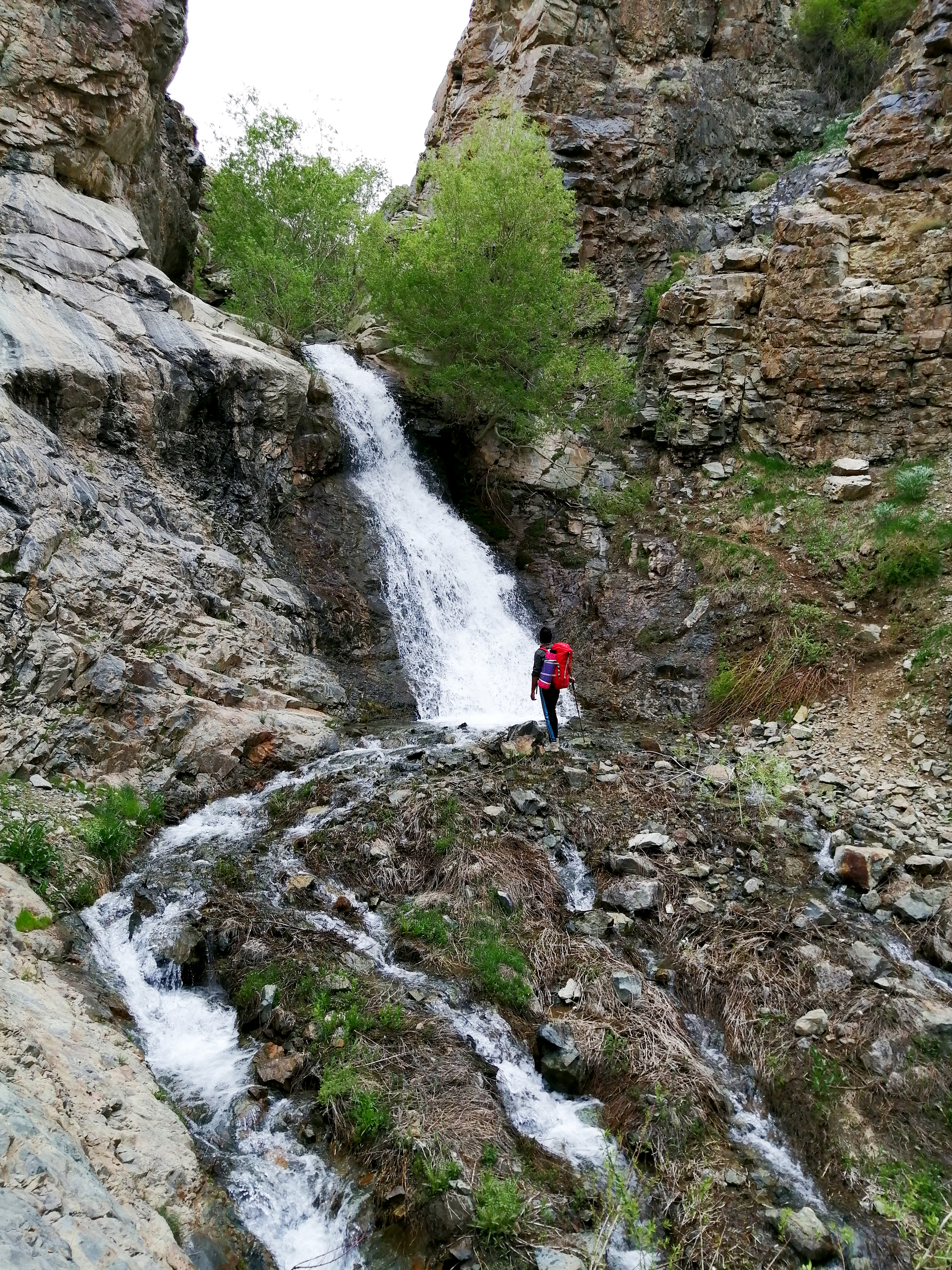
آبشار تلخه چار ،کوه شاه
