= Jiroft Dam =

Dam in Kerman, Iran

Coordinates: 28°53′05″N 57°26′53″E

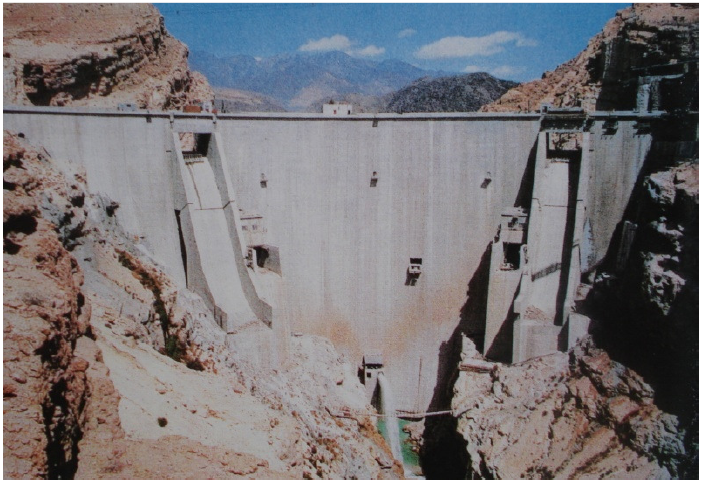
- Jiroft Dam
- Interactive map of Jiroft Dam

Jiroft Dam (Persian: سد جیرفت) is a hydroelectric dam in Iran with an installed electricity generating capability of 85 MWh situated in Kerman Province. The fifth concrete dam built in the country, it was begun in 1975 and completed in 1992 (6 Daymah 1370 in Persian calendar). It is located on Halil River (Halilrood) 40 km upstream of Jiroft (North-East of the city) in the narrow valley of Narab. Its reservoir capacity is around 410 million cubic metres up to the normal level (1185 metres above sea level). The maximum height of the dam is 134 m and the crest length is 277 m.

The dam in its first water year of operation (1992) survived an extraordinary flood (1 February 1993) with the peak discharge of 5035 cubic metres per second. The flood had a return period of 800 to 1000 years. The heavy rains of this year caused the dam to fill with water much sooner than the planned water storing duration. The spillways and other hydrodynamic outlets of the dam can manage to discharge up to 6500 cubic meters per seconds (the design flood with return period of 10000 years). The reservoir is planned to irrigate 14200 hectares of the downstream lands.

== See also ==
- List of power stations in Iran
- List of dams and reservoirs in Iran
- Dams in Iran
