= Konar Sandal =

Archaeological site situated in Kermān Province, Iran

- Location within Iran
- 28°26′57.74″N 57°46′42.32″E
- Type: Settlement
- Cultures: Jiroft culture
- Location: Konar Sandal, Kermān Province, Iran

Site notes
- Excavation dates: 2002-2008
- Archaeologists: Yousof Madjidzadeh
- Condition: In ruins

Iran National Heritage List
- Official name: Konar Sandal - Jiroft Culture
- Type: Mound
- Designated: 1931
- Reference no.: 52
- Conservation organization: Cultural Heritage, Handicrafts and Tourism Organization of Iran

Konar Sandal is a Bronze Age archaeological site, situated in the valley of the Halil River just south of Jiroft, Kermān Province, Iran.

== Archaeology ==
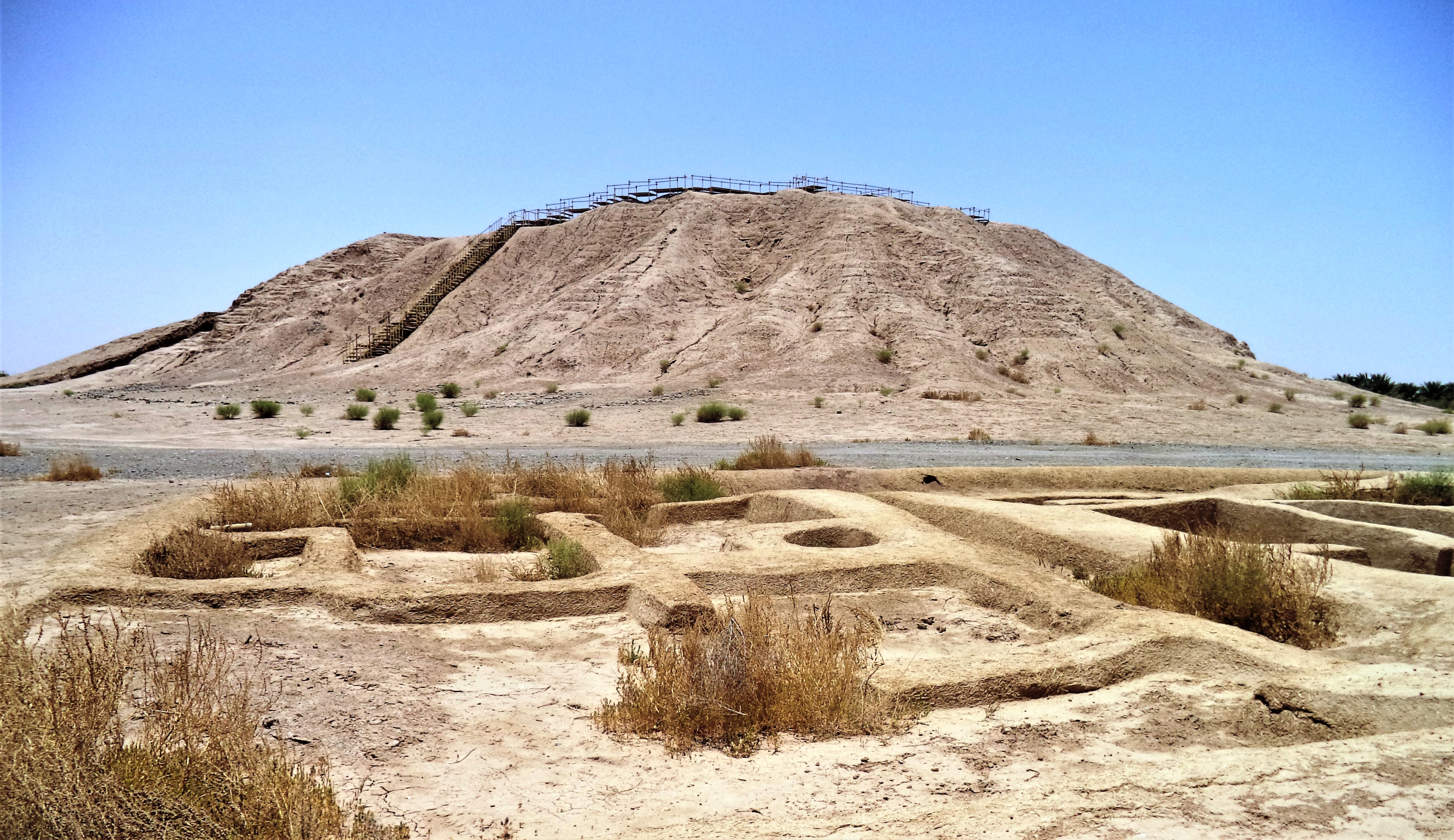
Konar Sandal South

The site consists of two mounds a few kilometers apart, called Konar Sandal North and Konar Sandal South with a height of 13 and 21 meters, respectively. Konar Sandal North, the larger of the two, has an area of about 300 meters by 300 meters. The site was first visited by Aurel Stein in 1936. The site was examined in the 1980s as part of an areal survey. Modern palm agriculture has destroyed the many small mounds in and around the main mounds that the survey identified and there is notable damage from looting.

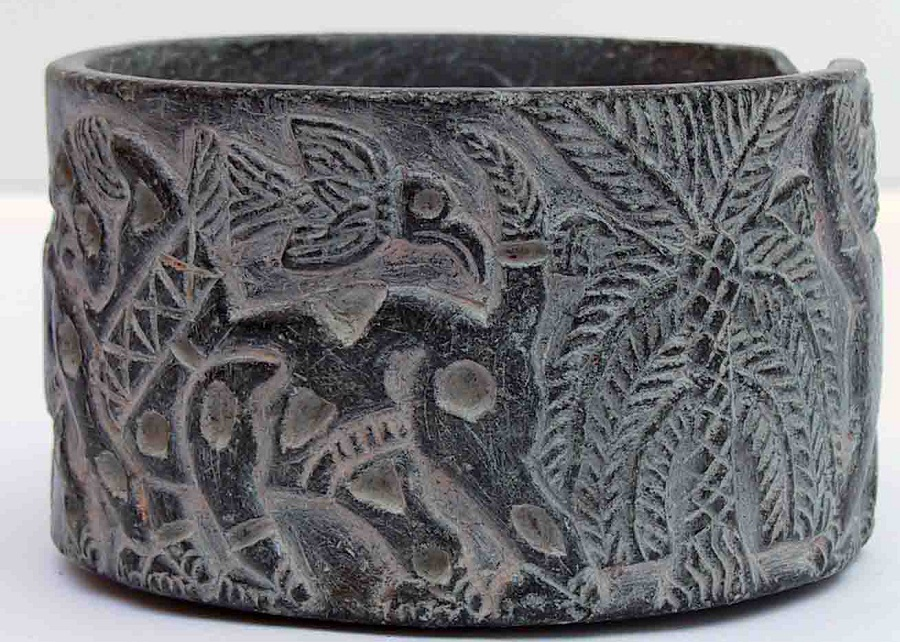
Konar Sandal

After objects from the site began appearing on the antiquities market in 2001, professional excavation were conducted from 2002 until 2008 by a team led by Yousef Majidzadeh. Among the finds were a decorated clay statue relief found in Konar Sandal South.

- Konar Sandal South - This mound consist of an upper town, with a medium-sized mudbrick building (termed a Citadel by the excavators), and a sizable surrounding lower town. The lower town is largely covered by modern agriculture. Radiocarbon dating (calibration method is unclear) date it to between 2880 and 2200 BC. This correlates to the Early Dynastic to Akkadian Empire period in Mesopotamia. A total of sixteen excavation trenches were dug at this mound. A number of clay sealings were found, both from stamp seals and cylinder seals. In Trench XIV a "city seal", used to seal a door, was recovered which matched those found at Jemdat Nasr and Ur and which prompted the theory that there was a Kengir League of cities in the Early Dynastic I period. The excavators identified four occupation levels on the upper mound. In the oldest level an administrative building was constructed, later demolished and infilled before the Citadel was built. The Citadel was surrounding by a 10 meter wide brick wall or platform (with niches). A small, 7 centimeter, inscribed brick fragment (later called text E') was found in a secondary context next to the gateway to the Citadel. It was thought to possibly contain 5 Linear Elamite characters though this is uncertain. The lower town was given over to residential and industrial uses.
- Konar Sandal North - Three sides of the mound have been heavily damaged by the mining of agricultural material. Twenty six excavation trenches were opened. The top of the mound holds two mudbrick platforms, the upper 150 meters by 150 meters and the lower 300 meters by 300 meters and 6.5 meters high. The upper platform is faced by niched buttresses that extend 4 meters and are 8 meters wide. The lower platform is faced by engaged semi-circular buttresses with a diameter of 4 meters spaced 1 meter apart. The dating of construction on Konar Sandal North is unclear aside from generally being from the 3rd millennium BC.

In 2006 a 11.5 centimeter by 7 centimeter by 1.8 centimeter inscribed baked brick (with Texts γ / D') was submitted to the excavators, claiming to have found it in his garden (distance from Konar Sandal site is unclear). A small excavation in the garden found the remains of a kiln and three inscribed bricks baked were found. Two of the tablets (texts α / B', β / C') have what could possibly be Linear Elamite symbols on one side and symbols of an unknown nature on the other. The third has only unknown symbols. Text B' bears 5 (or perhaps 6) characters and text C' 6 (or perhaps 7) characters. There has been speculation about the unknown symbols, called "Geometric script" by the excavator, ranging decorative gibberish to musical symbols. There has been controversy as well about whether the tables themselves are forgeries.

=== Mahtoutabad ===
The site of Mahtoutabad is located about 1.4 kilometers southeast of the Konar Sandal North and about 1.3 kilometers northeast of the Konar Sandal South. After the graveyard area was exposed in a 2001 flood it was heavily looted by locals and objects began appearing on the antiquities market. The site was professionally excavated by a team led by Y. Madzjidzadeh from 2006 to 2009. The excavators defined four stratigraphic occupation levels:

- Mahtoutabad I - c. 4100-3700 BC.
- Mahtoutabad II - c. 3700-3400 BC.
- Mahtoutabad III - c. 3400-3000 BC. Uruk 3/4 period ceramics including beveled rim bowls were found. Beveled rim bowls made up 13% of the ceramics found.
- Mahtoutabad IV - c. 2400 BC. Graveyard level.

=== Hajjiabad-Varamin ===
The site of Hajjiabad-Varamin lies about 5 kilometers southwest of Konar Sandal South. It was an industrial production site and occupied from the late fifth to the late third millennium BC. Several cemetery areas lie adjacent to the main mound in the east.

== History ==
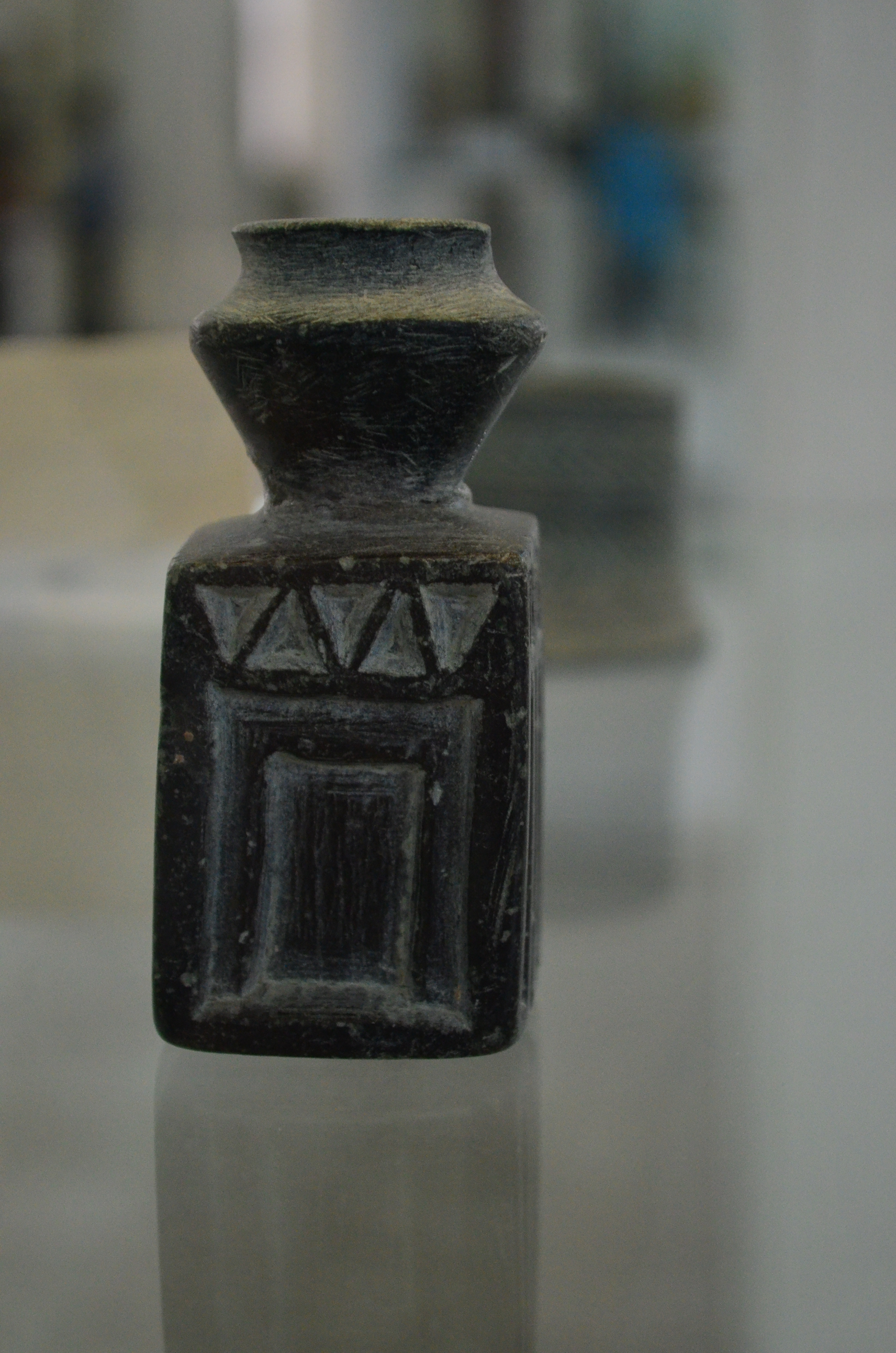
Chlorite vessel from Kerman Province, Iran. 3rd millennium BC - National Museum of Iran

The site of Konar Sandal South occupation has been dated to c. 2880 BC to c. 2200 BC in the Early Bronze Age. Dating of Konar Sandal North occupation pattern is less clear aside from being in the 3rd millennium BC. Based on ceramic and artistic parallels these sites are proposed to belong to an Early Bronze Age Jiroft culture along with Shahr-e Sukhteh, Shahdad, Tal-i-Iblis, and Tepe Yahya. This proposal has been criticized on various grounds. Majidzadeh suggests they may be the remains of the lost Aratta Kingdom. Other conjectures have connected the site with the obscure city-state of Marhashi. Shimashki has also been suggested.

== See also ==
- Ancient City Seals
- Cities of the ancient Near East
- List of Mesopotamian dynasties
- Proto-Elamite period
