= Mian Deh, Jiroft =

Mian Deh ميان ده
- Village
- Location within Iran
- Coordinates: 28°36′00″N 57°49′00″E
- Country: Iran
- Province: Kerman
- County: Jiroft
- Bakhsh: Central
- Rural District: Dowlatabad

Population (2006)
  - Total: 968
- Time zone: UTC+3:30 (IRST)
  - Summer (DST): UTC+4:30 (IRDT)

Mian Deh (Persian: ميان ده, also Romanized as Mīān Deh; also known as Mīān Deh-e Bālā and Mīāndeh-e ‘Olyā) is a village in Dowlatabad Rural District, in the Central District of Jiroft County, Kerman Province, Iran. At the 2006 census, its population was 968, in 226 families.
