= Mirək =

Mirak
- Azerbaijani: Mirək
- Location within Azerbaijan
- Coordinates: 39°19′21″N 47°03′07″E
- Country: Azerbaijan
- District: Jabrayil
- Time zone: UTC+4 (AZT)
  - Summer (DST): UTC+5 (AZT)

Mirək (also, Mirak and Mirek) is a village in the Jabrayil District of Azerbaijan. It was occupied by Armenian forces in 1993. The Army of Azerbaijan recaptured the village on or around November 4, 2020.
