= Bala taxation =

Ur III

Bala, Sumerian for "exchange", is the method by which the Ur III dynasty of Mesopotamia collected goods such as livestock, grain, labor and craft products from its provinces. Individuals of all rank were expected to contribute to this system. These taxes were used to fund building projects within the kingdom such as the building of canals which were vital in this area because the agriculture in this area was irrigated by water from the Tigris and Euphrates rivers. Those projects were built by Gurush/Geme (Sumerian), men and women workers respectively, paid using goods collected from the tax system. The provinces in the Ur III Empire such as Girsu, Umma and Lagash contributed materials according to the nature of goods they produced, their size and the amount of goods they could produce. For instance Girsu was a rich source of grain and would provide grain to the bala system whereas Umma was a source of other goods such as leather, reed, and wood. The central state also provided protection to the provinces as a means of protecting the resources while in transit as well as the cities from being overrun by raiders.

== Effects of the bala system ==
Anthropologists have reconstructed the amount of goods produced annually and the distribution of those goods among the empire. 500 elite level individuals are believed to have controlled 188 million liters of grain annually through the bala taxation system. Those goods were often used to support the temples, royal families, state administrators/elites, and army. Specialized individuals who no longer produced their own food also benefitted from this system. These specialized individuals likely would not have developed without the support coming from the government through the bala system. It is estimated that 500,000 nonfood-producing individuals relied on the bala system for their sustenance. This highlights a key aspect of the system that it created dependence of people and city-states upon each other. The type of payment that the specialized individuals received during this period often consisted of wood, oil and grains.

== Puzrish-Dagan ==
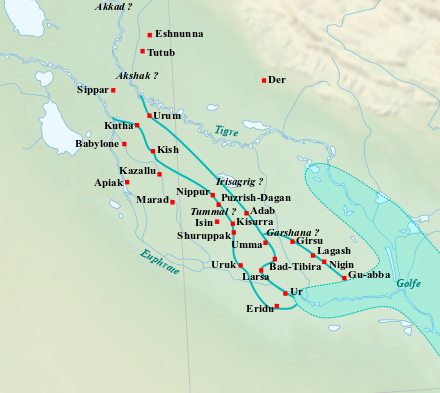
Basse Mesopotamie Akkad-Ur3

The materials collected from the bala taxation system would be recorded by kingdom administrators on clay tablets in cuneiform. There were 10,000-12,000 tablets reportedly found at Puzrish-Dagan (modern Drehem), which was an important administrative center for the bala system, though it has never been officially excavated. These tablets recorded the amount of taxes paid, vital sources of information for contemporary scholars researching the Ur III dynasty, and begin in the reign of Shulgi (2029 BCE–1982 BC) and end in the reign of Ibbi-Sin (1963-1940 BC). An important location of the bala taxation system was the previously mentioned Puzrish-Dagan. This location was an area where animals were stored and then distributed to the rest of the kingdom. Records from Puzrish-Dagan mention significant numbers of animals passing through it as part of the bala system. "Lists register, similarly, the quantities of barley and bran fed to animals upon a sheep-run near Lagash; it appears that in one month there was maintained a stock of over 22,000 sheep, nearly a thousand cows, and still more of other meat cattle; in three months fodder was provided for over 50,000 sheep, 1500 oxen, and this was but one of many such stations." This also suggests the fertility of the soil during this time was excellent or else these animals could not be supported.

== Demise of the bala system ==
The tablets disappear after the second year of Ibbi-Sin's reign, when scholars believe that the state stopped using the bala system. This seems to be due to internal stresses and conflict with neighboring powers which these also coincide with the decline of the state itself. The sequence of events leading to the system's demise remains unclear and the exact relationship between the decline of the state and the tax system is unclear. It is clear, however, that they are closely related and that when one is successful the other is also, and vice versa. During the reign of Ibbi-Sin, it appears that there was shortage of grain resources in the Ur state and the price of these resources was absurd. For instance, the price of one gur of barley normally was valued at one shekel of silver, but at this time one had to pay 20 talents of silver to acquire the barley. Further, the safety of trading enterprises was disrupted by groups of Amorites. These Amorites marched into Sumer and "took all the fortresses there." This is significant because those areas could no longer supply the central state. The local cities and provinces were forced to rely on themselves, while the weakened central state had to respond to threats with under-supplied and understaffed forces. As mentioned earlier, the participants of the system depended on each other and that served to help unite the different provincial centers. The events leading to the downfall of the state suggest that the state operated in a symbiotic relationship with the bala system. Since, the system lost access to many resources with Amorite incursions, the system could not function as effectively and thus the state weakened until it could not withstand the invasion of external forces. The final blow was made by Shimashki and Elam.
