= Halil Rud =

Halil Rud هليل رود
- Village
- Location within Iran
- Coordinates: 29°04′52″N 56°59′43″E
- Country: Iran
- Province: Kerman
- County: Rabor
- Bakhsh: Hanza
- Rural District: Javaran

Population (2006)
  - Total: 238
- Time zone: UTC+3:30 (IRST)
  - Summer (DST): UTC+4:30 (IRDT)

Halil Rud (Persian: هليل رود, also Romanized as Halīl Rūd; also known as Deh-e Halīl Rūd) is a village in Javaran Rural District, Hanza District, Rabor County, Kerman Province, Iran. At the 2006 census, its population was 238, in 50 families. It is located near Halil River.

== Excavations and findings ==
The area around Hali Rud was occupied in the Bronze Age by the Jiroft culture, also known as the "Halirud style". In 2002–2003 the Iranian government publicized its collection of confiscated artifacts which originated from the Halil Rud necropolises; these included elaborately-carved chlorite vessels and other grave goods. One grave contained "animal bones and food offerings, ceramics, and stone and copper items ... [indicating] a coherent cultural and chronological framework, around 2400-2200 BC".

Since February 2003, archaeologist have recovered a wealth of artifacts from the Mahtoutabad necropolis. The two nearby mounds, Konar Sandal South and North, were also excavated. A 2013 research paper about the South mound states that work during 2006 to 2009 "revealed the remains of three successive settlements dating to the fourth millennium BC".

Excavation re-commenced in 2014 and revealed art works of "complexity and beauty" and artifacts that proved that the society had several writing systems. According to National Geographic, the content of the mounds is significant:

They turned out to contain the remains of two major architectural complexes. The northern mound included a cult building, while in the southern one were the remains of a fortified citadel. At the foot of the mounds, buried under many feet of sediment, were the remains of smaller buildings. It’s believed that the two mounds had once formed part of a unified urban settlement that stretched many miles across the plateau ... [artifacts] "have been dated to between 2500 and 2200 B.C. [They are said to be evidence of] the "development of a complex civilization".
