= Bampur River =

River in Iran

Coordinates: 27°10′36.0″N 60°36′47.7″E

Bampur River (Persian: رودخانه بمپور) is located in south eastern Iran and flows into the Baluchistan region. The Bampur River starts in the Karvandar Mountains and flows 120 km past Damin, Bampur and Iranshahr before dissipating in the desert sands.

== History ==
The Bampur River Valley has been inhabited since the 3rd millennium BC when Bronze Age villages formed. The first Europeans to reach the Bampur River were Captain Grant and Sir Henry Pottinger in 1809. Sir Aurel Stein visited the area in 1932.
