= Jebal Barez =

Mountain chain in Iran

Coordinates: 28°34′N 58°14′E

The Jebal Barez (Persian: جبال بارز) is a mountain chain in the Kerman Province of Iran. This mountain range stretches for some 100 km north-west to south-east, parallel to the Halil Rud, to the north-east of Jiroft and to the south-west of Bam, rising to a maximum elevation of 3,750 m. The mountains of this range are continued by other mountains such as Mount Shahsavaran and Mount Hudian to the south-east. They separate the plain of Hamun-e Jaz Murian from that of Namakzar-e Shahdad and Lut desert.

== Etymology ==
The root of the name of this mountain is identical to that of the Alburz in northern Iran and the Elbrus in the Caucasus, and therefore, it is likewise derived from an unattested Old Persian term *Harā Brzatī, cognate with Avestan Harā Bərəzaitī (see Harā Bərəzaitī), meaning "high watchpost". The more proper spelling of the name of this mountain is Albarez. Albarez is of the same construct as the names Alburz and Elbrus.

The ancient Iranian people seem to have given this name to the tallest mountains in any area that they happened to live (exactly as the Turkic people did when they called all the tallest mountains in their sight, "Qaradağ"/Karadag, with the term qara/kara standing for great/big, as well as color black). In fact, into the early 20th century, the northern portions of the Hindu Kush mountains near Balkh/Mazar-i Sharif was also known as Mt. Alburz, as recorded by the British travelers like Alexander Burnes.

== Geology ==
Made chiefly of Eocene extrusive and intrusive rocks, Jebal Barez mountain chain is situated in what is called the Central Iranian Range, the Sahand-Bazman volcanic range or belt, a mountain range which was formed mainly during Eocene volcanism and plutonism and that stretches approximately from Sahand Volcano in the north-west of Iran to Bazman Volcano in the south-east of Iran.
