= Halil River =

River in Iran

Halil River Haliri River, Kharaw or ZarDasht River (upper reaches)
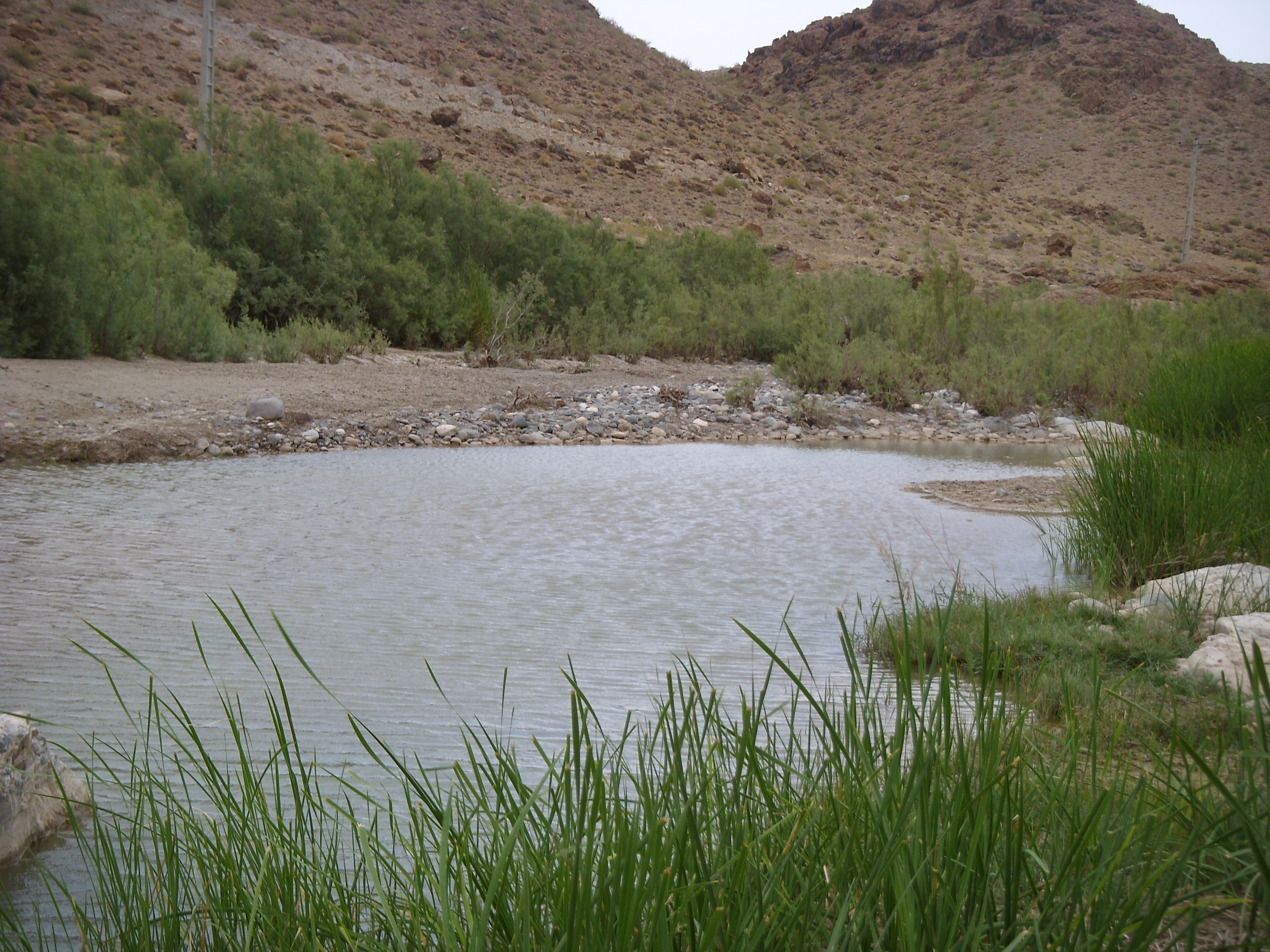
- Zardasht river, the longest tributary of Halil river

Location
- Country: Iran
- Province: Kerman

Physical characteristics
- Source: Kuh-e Shah mountain
  - location: 20 km (12 mi) north-east of Baft
  - elevation: 4,400 m (14,400 ft) above sea level
- Mouth: Hamun-e Jaz Murian
  - location: Baluchistan
- Length: 390 km (240 mi)

Basin features
- Tributaries
  - left: Zardasht River, Rabor River
  - right: Narab River
- Longest tributary: Zardasht River

Halīl River or HalīlRood (Persian: هلیل‌رود) also Haliri River, known as the Kharaw or ZarDasht in its upper reaches, is a river stretching for some 390 kilometres (240 mi) running in the Baft, Jiroft and Kahnuj districts of Kerman Province, Iran.

The Halil rises at 4,400 metres (14,400 ft) above sea level in the Kuh-e shah mountain about 20 kilometres (12 mi) to the north-east of Baft, flowing to the south-west until it is joined by the Zardasht and Rabor rivers. Turning towards the south, it flows along the foothills of the Bahr aseman mountains, then to the south-east until Jiroft Dam, which is 130 metres (430 ft) high, about 40 kilometres (25 mi) upstream of Jiroft (28°51′30″N 57°28′0″E) at the confluence with the Narab. It passes some 15 kilometres (9 mi) east of Kahnuj and terminates in the Hamun-e Jaz Murian of Baluchistan.

The climate of the Halil Rud or Halilrood (Rud or Rood means "river" in Persian) basin is extremely hot in summer and of moderate temperature in winter. 57 °C (135 °F) in August 1933.

The Halil riverbanks are subject to periodical flooding, including the historical flood which destroyed Jiroft in ca. AD 1000, and one in 1993.

== Archaeology ==
The basin contains the sites of the Bronze Age Jiroft culture. Near the river is the village of Halil Rud (not far from the city of Jiroft); the area nearby "became famous between 2002/2003 [when news of] thousands of confiscated burial goods, especially elaborated carved chlorite vessels from the necropolises of Halil Rud" were released to public.

Since February 2003, archaeologists have recovered a wealth of artifacts from the necropolis which they had named Mahtoutabad. The two nearby mounds were also excavated: Konar Sandal South and North. A 2013 research paper about the South mound states that work during 2006 to 2009 "revealed the remains of three successive settlements dating to the fourth millennium BC".

Excavation re-commenced in 2014 and revealed art works of "complexity and beauty" and artifacts that proved that the society had several writing systems. According to National Geographic, the content of the mounds is significant:

They turned out to contain the remains of two major architectural complexes. The northern mound included a cult building, while in the southern one were the remains of a fortified citadel. At the foot of the mounds, buried under many feet of sediment, were the remains of smaller buildings. It's believed that the two mounds had once formed part of a unified urban settlement that stretched many miles across the plateau ... [artifacts] "have been dated to between 2500 and 2200 B.C. [They are said to be evidence of] the "development of a complex civilization".

== Literature ==
- Encyclopædia Iranica
