= Jiroft culture =

Proposed early Bronze Age culture in Iran

- Created: 5000 BP to 4200 BP

Location

The Jiroft culture, also known as the Intercultural style or the Halilrud style, is an early Bronze Age (3rd millennium BC) archaeological culture, located in the territory of present-day Sistan and Baluchestan and Kermān provinces of Iran.

The proposed type site is Konar Sandal, near Jiroft in the Halil River area. Other significant sites associated with the culture include Shahr-e Sukhteh (Burnt City), Tepe Bampur, Espiedej (fa), Shahdad, Tal-i-Iblis and Tepe Yahya.

The grouping of these sites as an "independent Bronze Age civilization with its own architecture and language", intermediate between Elam to the west and the Indus Valley civilization to the east, was first proposed by Yusef Majidzadeh, head of the archaeological excavation team in Jiroft (south central Iran). The hypothesis is based on a collection of artifacts that have been formally excavated and recovered from looters by Iranian authorities; accepted by many to have derived from the Jiroft area (as reported by online Iranian news services, beginning in 2001).

== Discovery and excavation ==
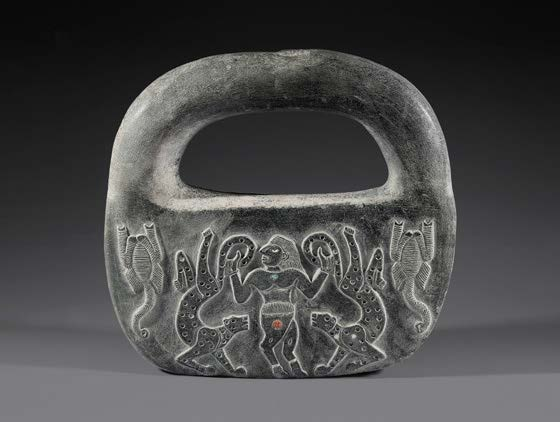
’Handbag-shaped object’/‘handle weight’, depicting Master of animals carved in chlorite, Jiroft, Kerman ca. 2500 BC, Bronze Age I, National Museum of Iran

Early excavations at Kerman were conducted by Sir Aurel Stein around 1930. One of the most notable archaeological excavations done in Kerman Province was one done by a group led by Professor Joseph Caldwell from Illinois State Museum in 1966 (Tal-i-Iblis) and Lamberg-Karlovsky from Harvard University in 1967 (Tepe Yahya, Sogan Valley, Dolatabad). Many artifacts associated with Jiroft were recovered from looters described as "destitute villagers" who had scavenged the area south of Jiroft before 2001, when a team led by Yusef Majidzadeh began excavations.

The primary Jiroft site consists of two mounds a few kilometers apart, called Konar Sandal A and B with a height of 13 and 21 meters, respectively (approximate location 28.5°N 57.8°E). At Konar Sandal B, a two-story, windowed citadel with a base of close to 13.5 hectares was found. The team uncovered more than two square kilometers of remains from a city dating back to at least the late 3rd millennium BC. The data Madjidzadeh's team has gathered demonstrates that Jiroft's heyday was from 2500 BC to 2200 BC.

The looted artifacts and some vessels recovered by the excavators were of the so-called "intercultural style" type of pottery known from Mesopotamia and the Iranian Plateau, and since the 1960s from nearby Tepe Yahya in Baft.

Archaeologist Oscar Muscarella of the Metropolitan Museum of Art criticizes that the excavators resorted to sensationalist announcements while being more slow in publishing scholarly reports, and their claims that the site's stratigraphy shows continuity into the 4th millennium as overly optimistic. Muscarella does nevertheless acknowledge the importance of the site.

According to Majidzadeh, geophysical operations by French experts in the region indicate the existence of at least 10 historical and archaeological periods in the region belonging to different civilizations who lived in this area during different periods of time in history. According to the French experts who studied this area, the evidence remained from these civilizations may be traced up to 11 meters under the ground.

== Gallery ==
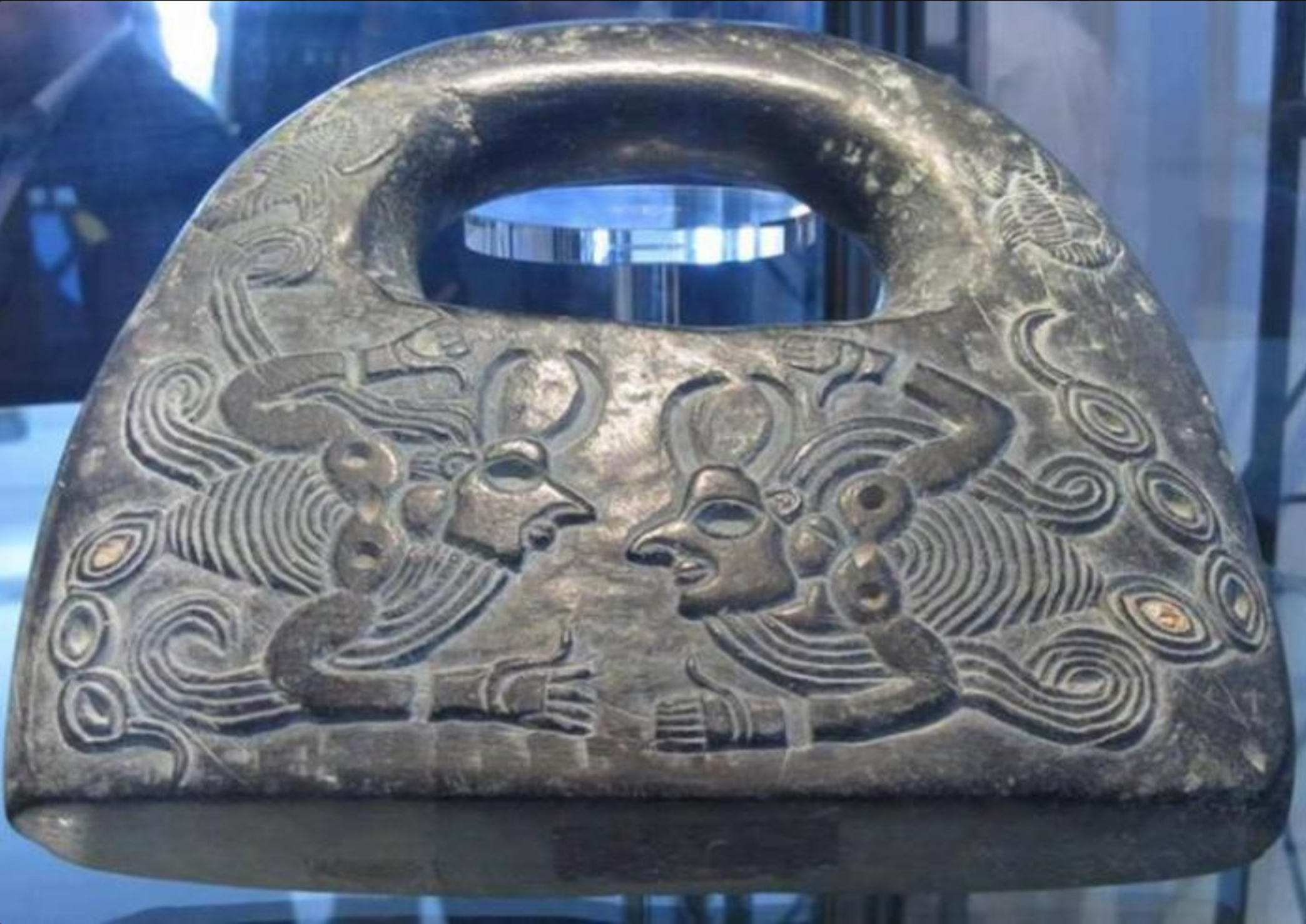
’Handbag-shaped object’/‘handle weight’ with
bas reliefs depicting Scorpion men

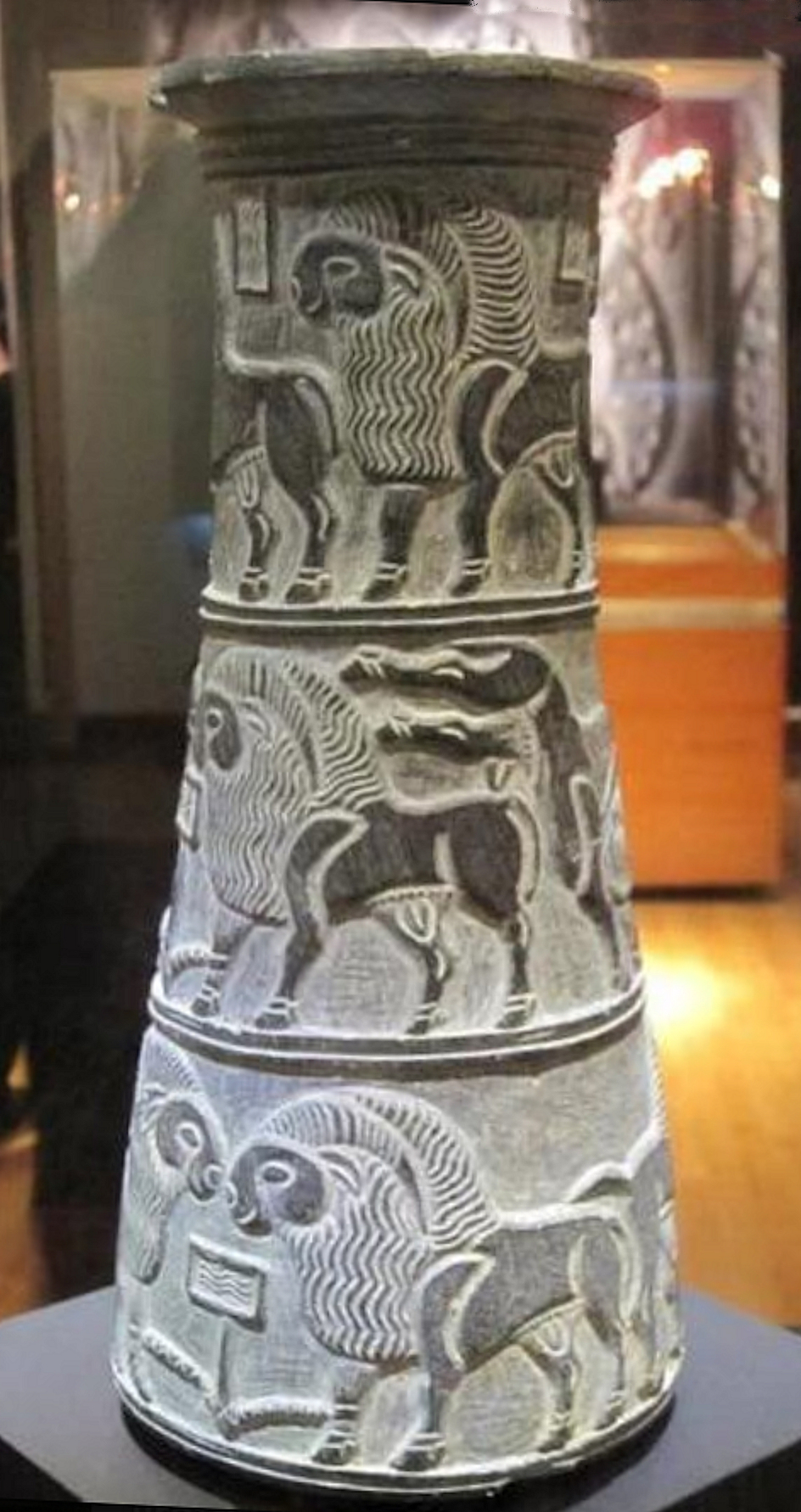
Tall vase carved with three bands depicting bovids

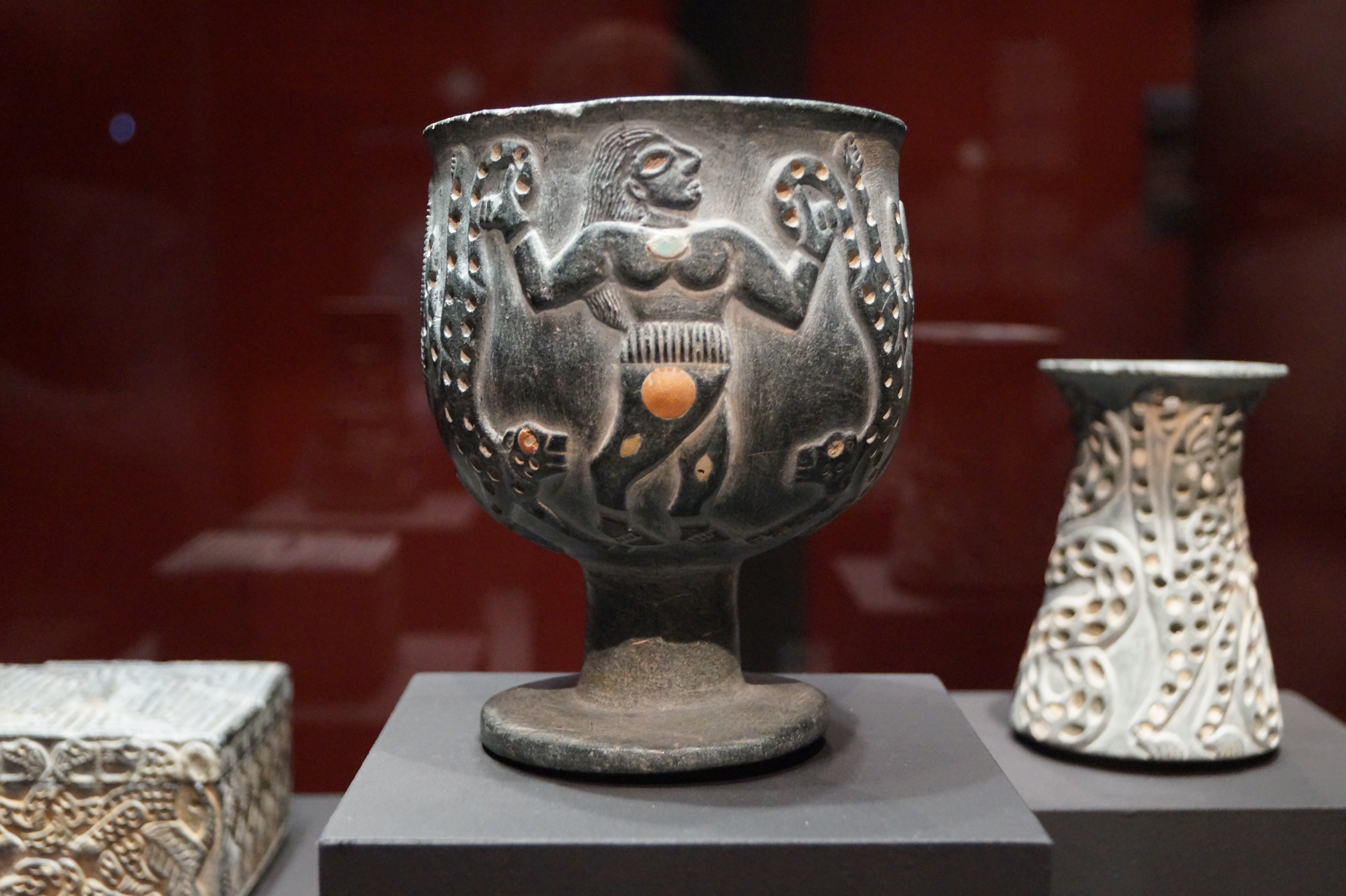
Jiroft vase of goblet form depicting Master of Animals flanked by leopards, 2800-2300 BC

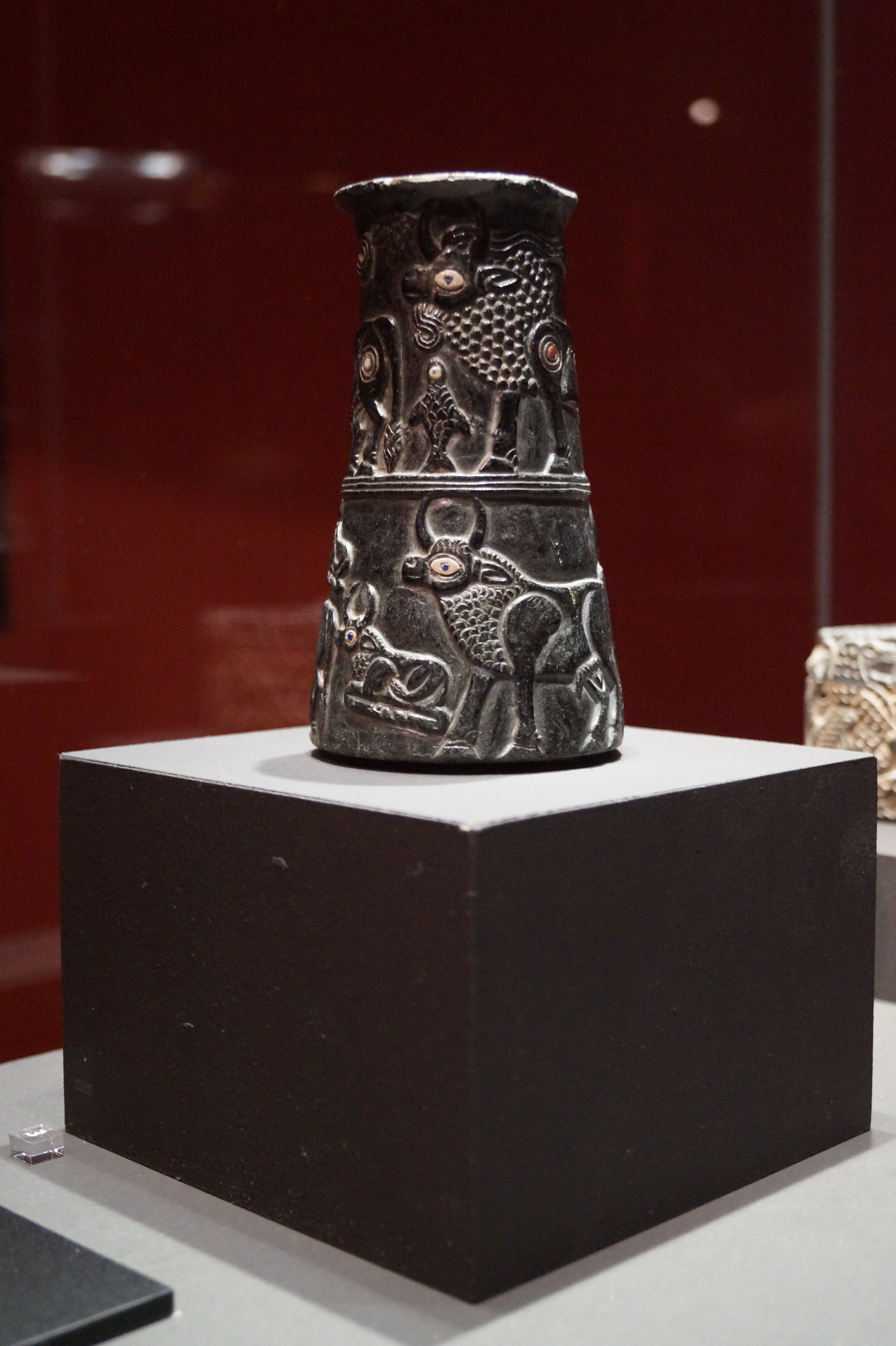
Jiroft vase, 2800-2300 BC

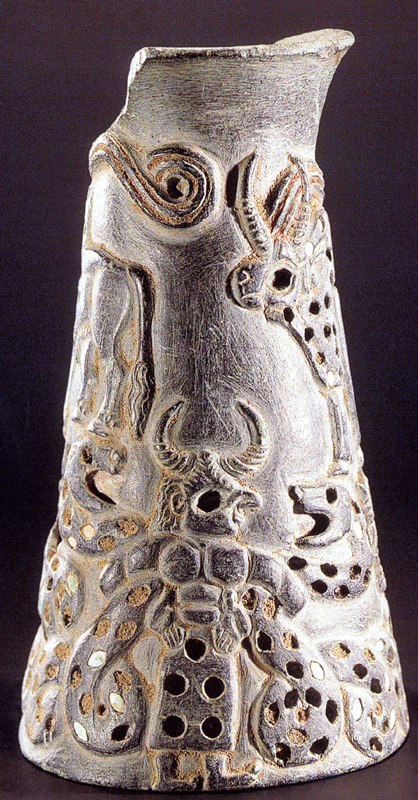
Vase from the Jiroft region. A "two horned" figure wrestling with serpents.

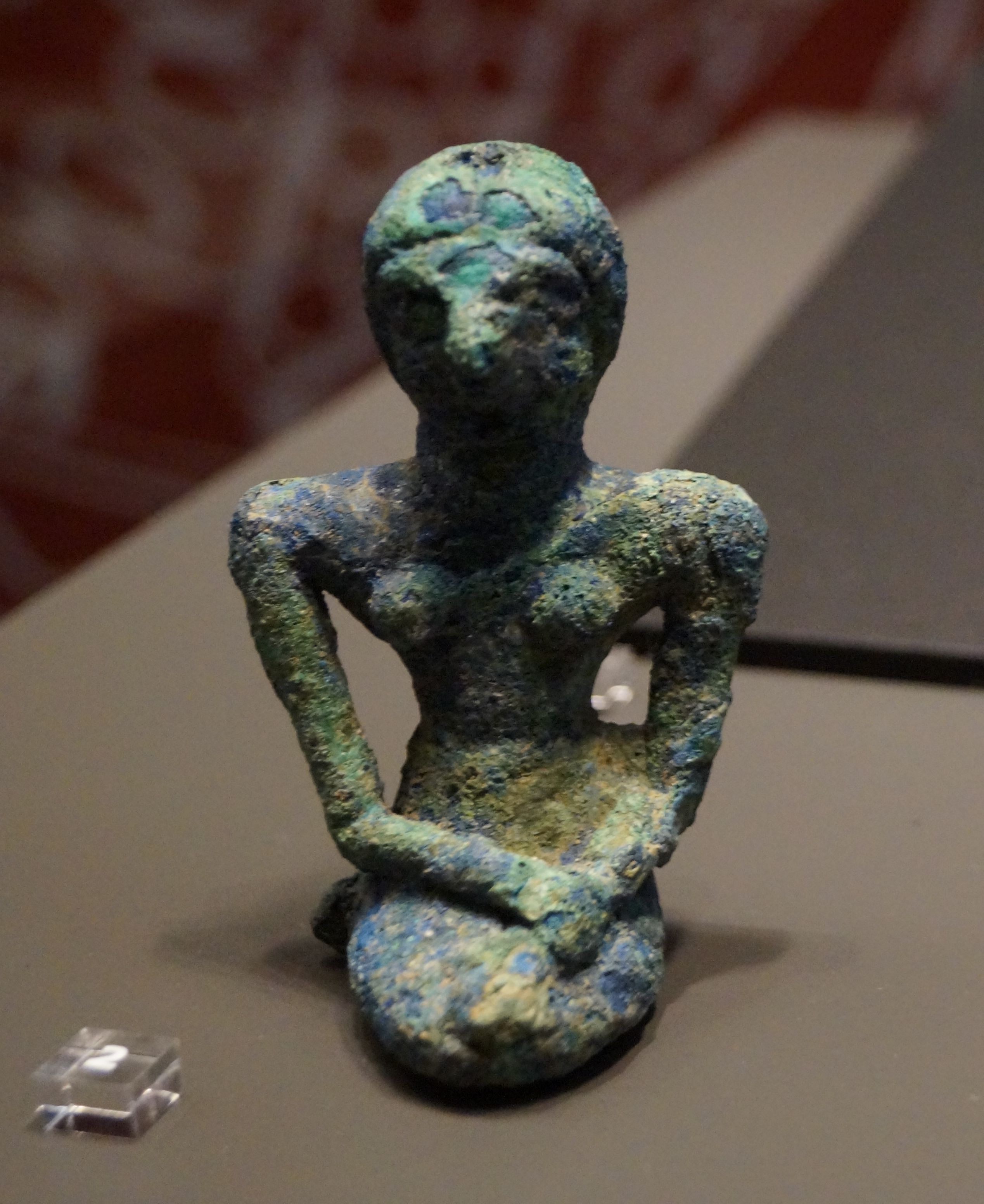
Jiroft statuette of kneeling woman 2800-2300 BC

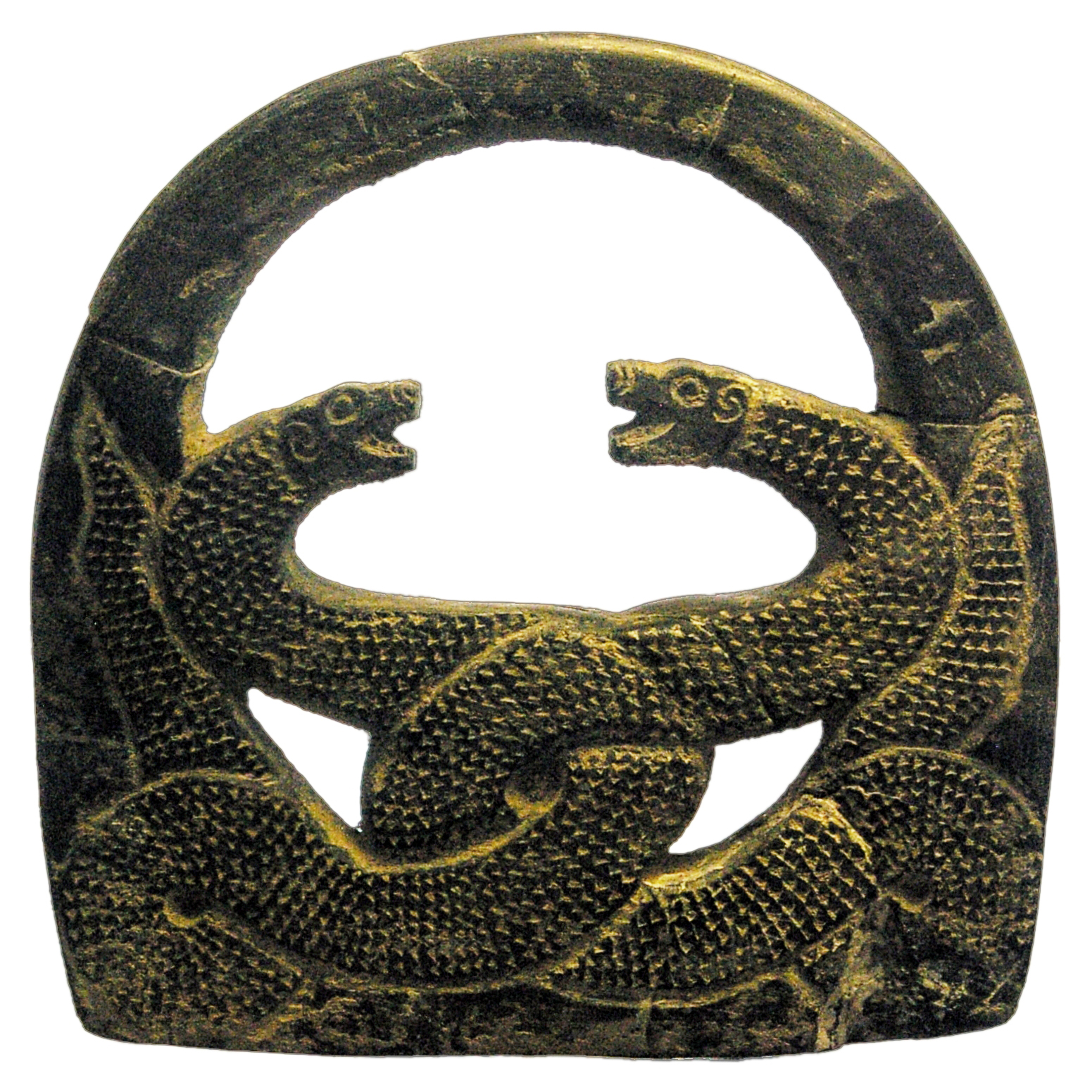
‘Handbag-shaped object’/‘handle weight’ featuring sculpted,intertwined serpents

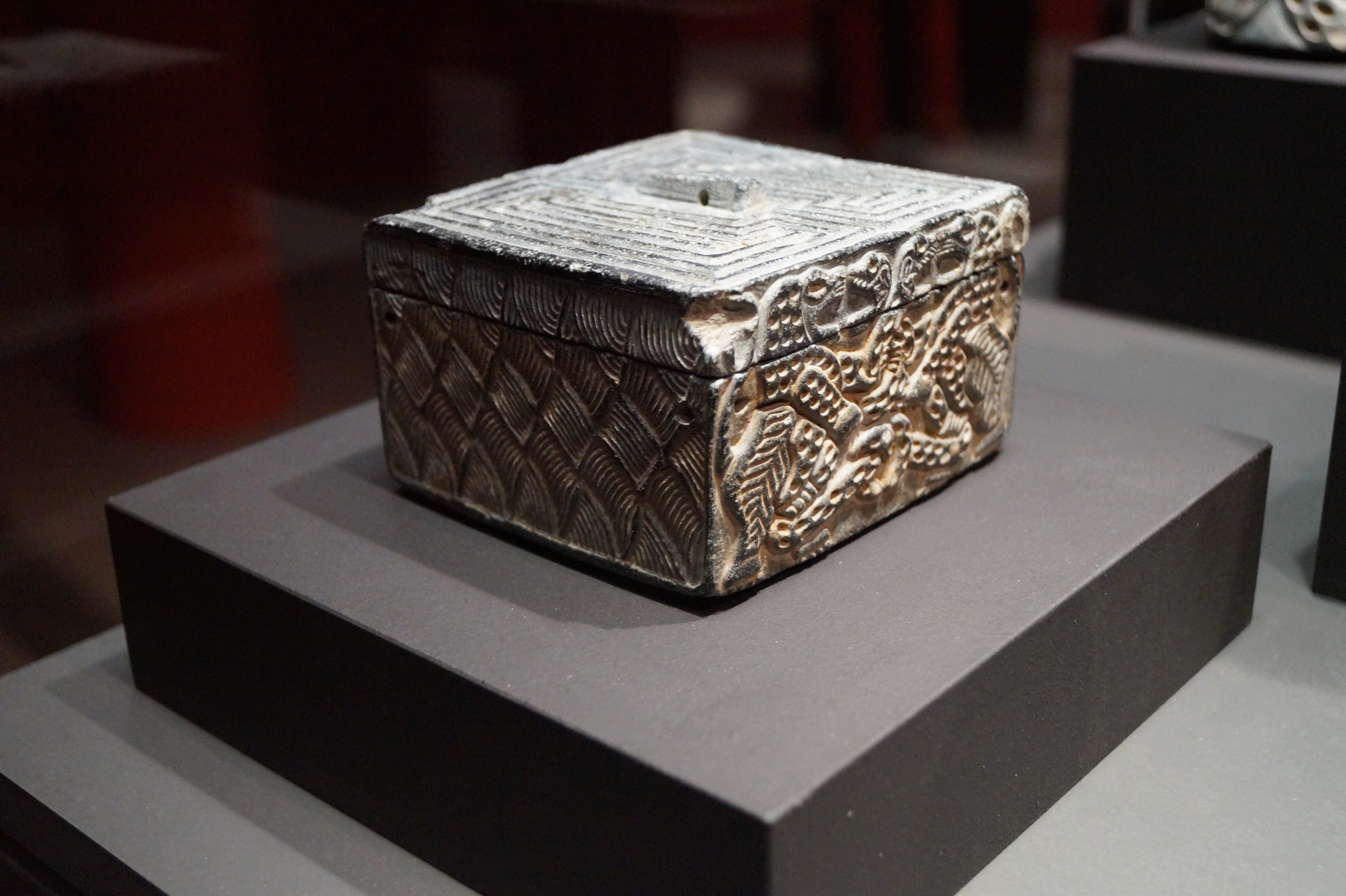
Chlorite vessel, Iran, c. 2800–2300 BC.

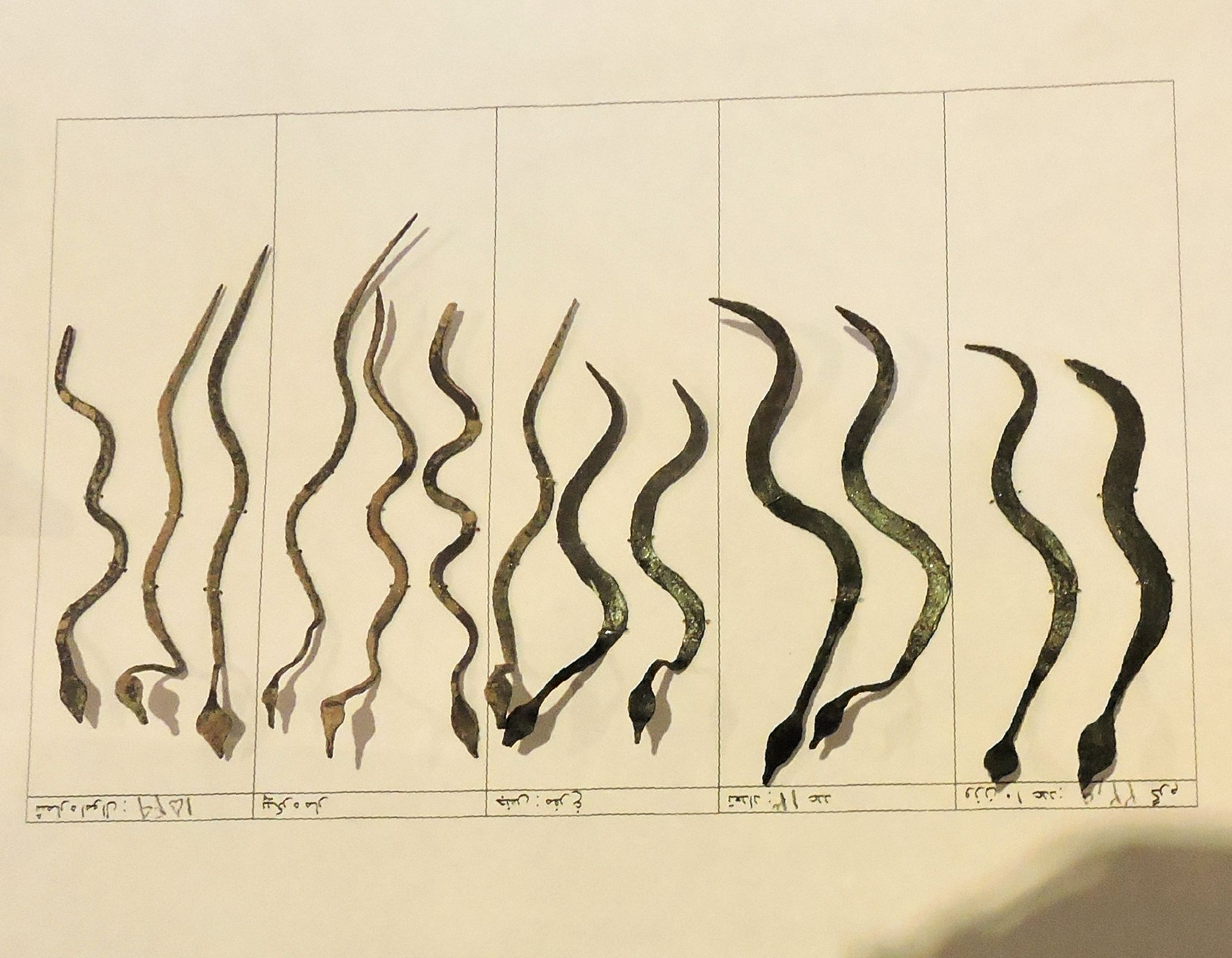
Brazen snakes

== Helmand culture ==
The Helmand culture of western Afghanistan was a Bronze Age culture of the 3rd millennium BC. Some scholars link it with Shahr-i Sokhta, Mundigak, and Bampur.

The term "Helmand civilization" was proposed by M. Tosi. This civilization flourished between 2500 and 1900 BC, and may have coincided with the great flourishing of the Indus Valley Civilization. This was also the final phase of Periods III and IV of Shahr-i Sokhta, and the last part of Mundigak Period IV.

Thus, the Jiroft culture is closely related to the Helmand culture. The Jiroft culture flourished in eastern Iran, and the Helmand culture in western Afghanistan at the same time. In fact, they may represent the same cultural area.

== Writing system ==
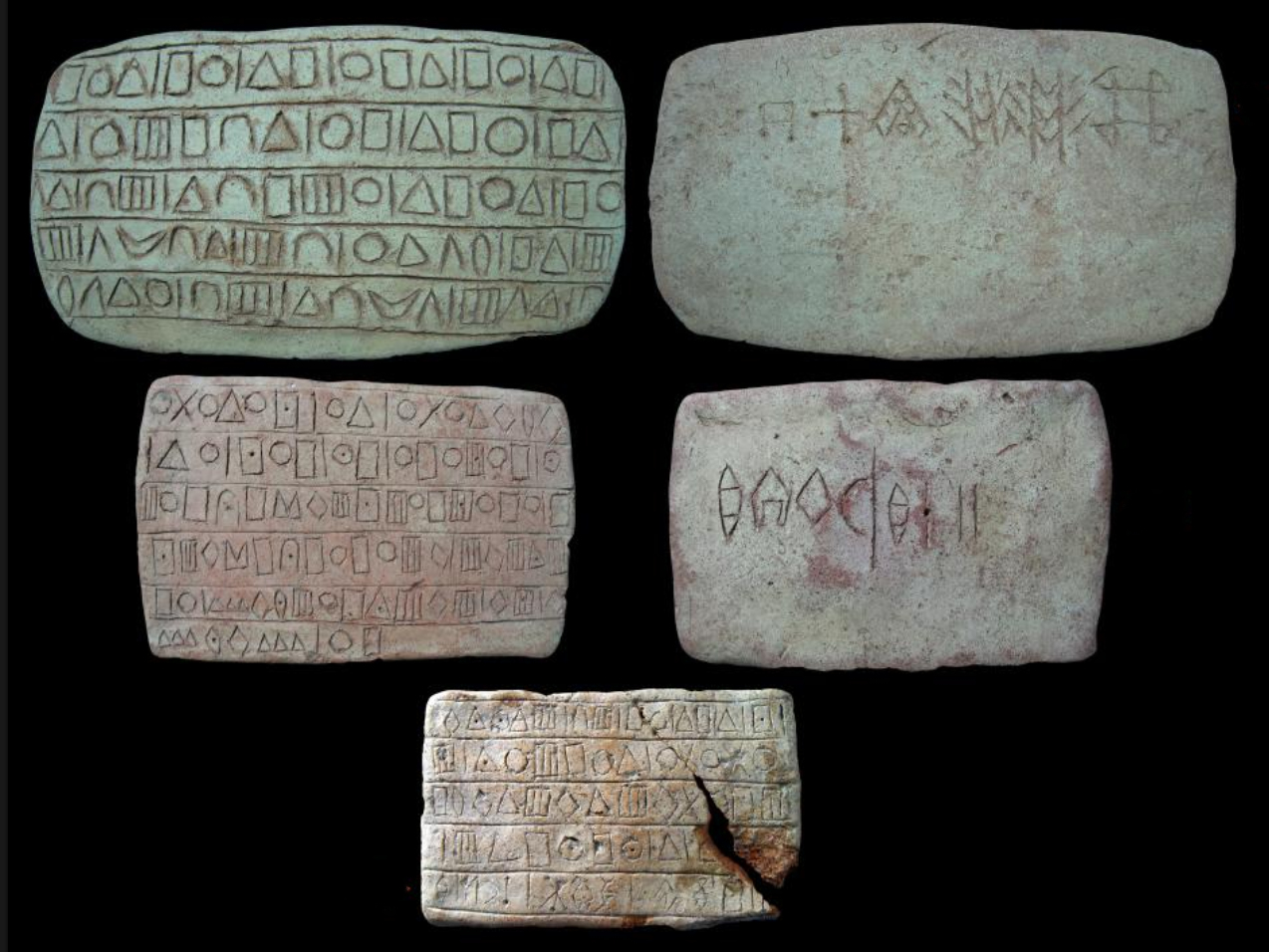
Jiroft culture inscriptions.

An inscription, discovered in a palace, was carved on a brick whose lower left corner only has remained, explained Yusef Majidzadeh, head of the Jiroft excavation team. "The two remaining lines are enough to recognize the Elamite script," he added. "The only ancient inscriptions known to experts before the Jiroft discovery were cuneiform and hieroglyph," said Majidzadeh, adding that "The new-found inscription is formed by geometric shapes and no linguist around the world has been able to decipher it yet."

Some archeologists believe the discovered inscription is the most ancient script found so far, predating these others, and that the Elamite Cuneiform and Sumero-Akkadian Cuneiform written language originated in Jiroft, where the writing system developed first in its original form and was then spread across the old world.

== Possible connection with Aratta ==
Majidzadeh has attempted to identify the Jiroft sites with the land of Aratta mentioned in Sumerian sources. His conclusions have been met with skepticism from a number of scholars. Other conjectures (e.g. Daniel T. Potts, Piotr Steinkeller) have connected Konar Sandal with the obscure city-state of Marhashi, that apparently lay to the east of Elam proper.

== See also ==
- Prehistoric Iran
- List of Iranian artifacts abroad
- Kulli culture
- International Rankings of Iran in History
- Derafsh Shahdad
- Konar Sandal on map

== Sources ==
- Jiroft, Fabuleuse Decouverte en Iran, Dossiers Archeologica 287, October 2003.
- Yousef Mazidzadeh, Jiroft earliest oriental civilization (2004).
- O. White Muscarella, Jiroft and "Jiroft-Aratta": A Review Article of Yousef Madjidzadeh, Jiroft: The Earliest Oriental Civilization, Bulletin of the Asia Institute 15 (2005) 173–198.
- Andrew Lawler, Ancient Writing or Modern Fakery?, Science 3 August 2007: Vol. 317. no. 5838, pp. 588–589.
- Andrew Lawler, Iranian Dig Opens Window on New Civilization, Science 21 May 2004: Vol. 304. no. 5674, pp. 1096–1097.
- M.R. Maheri The Early Civilizations of Kerman (تمدّن های نخستین کرمان), Markaze Kerman Shenasaee (2000), 1st edition, ISBN 964-6487-21-1
- lost civilization documentary by Roger Matthews (archaeologist) on YouTube
- Jiroft, Fabuleuse Decouverte en Iran, Dossiers Archeologica 287, October 2003.
- Yousef Mazidzadeh, Jiroft earliest oriental civilization (2004).
- O. White Muscarella, Jiroft and "Jiroft-Aratta": A Review Article of Yousef Madjidzadeh, Jiroft: The Earliest Oriental Civilization, Bulletin of the Asia Institute 15 (2005) 173–198.
- Andrew Lawler, Ancient Writing or Modern Fakery?, Science 3 August 2007: Vol. 317. no. 5838, pp. 588–589.
- Andrew Lawler, Iranian Dig Opens Window on New Civilization, Science 21 May 2004: Vol. 304. no. 5674, pp. 1096–1097.
- Jiroft and "Jiroft-Aratta" A Review Article of Yousef Madjidzadeh
