= Baloch people in Iran =

Baloch Iranians
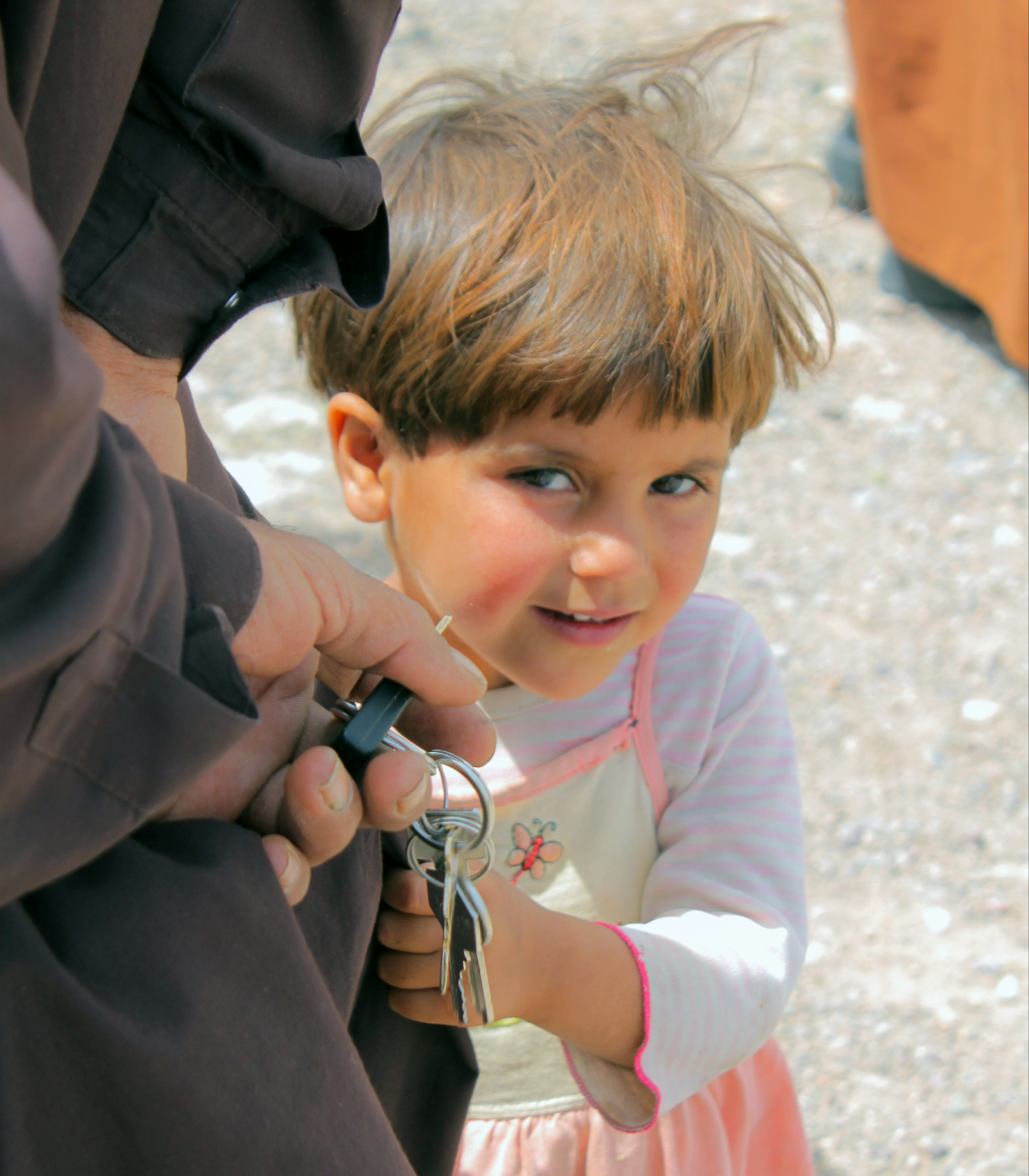
- Baloch child from Iranian Balochistan.

Total population
- 4.8 million

Regions with significant populations
- Mainly Sistan and Baluchestan Province: (Kerman; Hormozgan; Khorasan)

Languages
- Balochi (Rakhshani dialect), Persian

Religion
- Sunni Islam (majority), Shia Islam (minority)

Related ethnic groups
- Baloch and other Iranian peoples

The Baloch in Iran (Balochi: ایرانءِ بلۏچ) are an ethnic group residing in the southeastern and eastern regions of Iran.

== History ==
=== Kerman ===
Abu 'Ali Muhammad b. Ilyas was member of the Samanid army and was of Sogdian origin. After a rebellion failed he fled south, eventually arriving at Kerman in 932. He managed to extend his control over the northern part of the province, while the southern and eastern mountainous portions remained under the control of the Baloch.

=== Sarhad ===
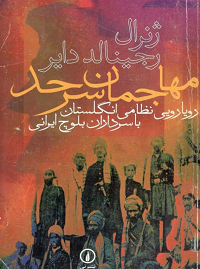
The Raiders of the Sarhhad written by Reginald Dyer, translated in Persian

Firuz Shah and Edro Shah were one of the ancestors of Baloch tribe of Tamandani, who ruled the Sarhad until the Safavid dynasty.

Mir Bolan Rigi was a Baloch general who accompanied Nader Shah Afshar in the Battle of Karnal. His assistance to Nader paved the way for the invasion of India. Nader Shah granted Mir Bolan Rigi the region of Mirjaveh in return for Mir Bolan’s assistance in the battle against India. The name Mirjaveh in the Balochi language means "place of the Mir" (residence of the Emir) and refers to this historical event.

=== World War I & the British campaign in 1916 ===
During the 19th century at time of World War I the British expanded their influence into Balochistan as part of their broader colonial strategy. The Baloch tribes, resisted the influence of British powers. This resistance took the form of tribal rebellions and sporadic attacks in the border region. The Baloch tribes, resisted the influence of the British.

This resistance took the form of tribal rebellions and sporadic attacks in the border region. The three major tribes that performed raids and disturbed the British line were the Yarahmadzais, Gamshadzais, and Ismaelzais. Sardar Jiand Khan Yarahmadzai, Juma Khan the tribal chief of the Ismaelzais and Khalil Khan Gamshadzai fought against Reginald Dyer, in the Battle of Jiand lost his son and the Gamshadzais chief (Khalil Khan) got killed during one of the battles. two of the yarahmadzais lost their lives while the losses for Dyer were devastating.

=== Qajar-Pahlavi period ===
Britain and Iran divided Balochistan into many parts, with the British creating the Balochistan Agency in 1877. In the 19th century, nationalists in western Balochistan revolted against the Persian occupation. At the end of the 19th century, when Sardar Hussein Narui Baloch started an uprising against Persia which was crushed by joint Anglo-Persian mission forces. The struggle between the Qajar dynasty, and the British in eastern Balochistan, gave western Balochis a chance to gain control of their territory in western Balochistan. At the beginning of the 20th century. In 1916. Mir Dost Muhammad Khan Baloch, Bahram Khan's nephew, succeeded to the throne, and in 1920, he proclaimed himself Shah-e-Balochistan ("Shah of Balochistan") however in 1928, Reza Shah came into power and Persian forces started operations against Balochi forces with the help of British.

The Baloch were defeated and Mir Dost Muhammad Khan Baloch was captured. In Sarhad, Sardar Said Khan Kurd, who was the chief of Baloch tribes resisted the Qajar attack, but Ebrahim Khan Zahir al-Dawlah, the governor of Bam, defeated him with government forces. However, Ebrahim Khan failed to capture the whole of the Sarhad.

=== Pahlavi period ===
During the 1950s, a tribal revolt led by Baloch farmer Mir Daad Shah struck south eastern Iran. He participated in a rebellion and armed insurgency against the Shah of Iran, Mohammad Reza Pahlavi, in the 1950s.

=== Government of the Islamic Republic ===
On September 30, 2022, the "Bloody Friday" massacre occurred, when in Zahedan a large number of Baloch civilians gathered for Friday prayers at the Grand Makki Mosque, the largest Sunni mosque in Iran. After the prayers, peaceful demonstrations began, demanding justice for the sexual assault case of the alleged rape of a 15-year-old Baloch girl in June by a commander of the police force in Chabahar. Iranian security forces, including the Islamic Revolutionary Guard Corps (IRGC) and riot police, surrounded the area and opened fire on the protesters. According to human rights organizations such as Amnesty International and Baloch activist groups, at least 96 people were killed on the day of the massacre, and hundreds were injured.

Abdolhamid Ismaeelzahi called the incident a "catastrophe" and demanded "trial and punishment for those responsible for those who have killed people", adding that worshipers were shot in head and heart by snipers. From this event, a picture of Khodanur Lojei, a Baloch protester whose hands were tied to a flagpole with a cup of water put out of his reach in front of him, became a symbol during the 2022–2023 Iranian protests.

== Distribution ==
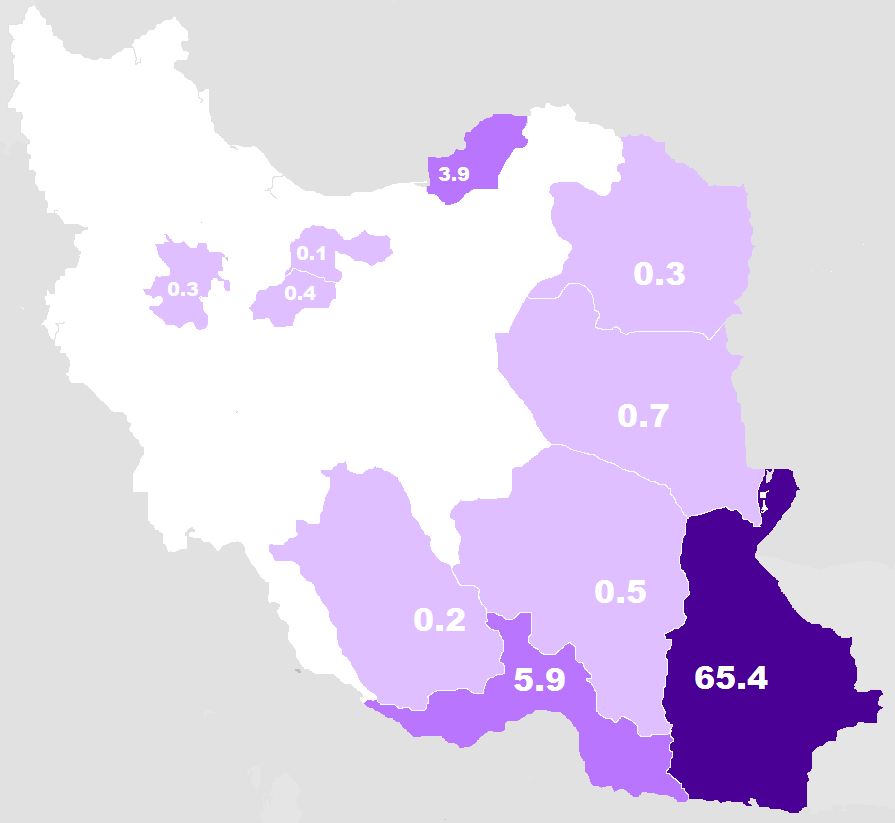
The distribution of Baloch people based on their mother tongue in the provinces of Iran

The Baloch in are the majority ethnic inhabitants of the region of the Sistan-Baluchestan province in Iran. The town of Jask in neighbouring Hormozgan Province is also inhabited by Baloch people. Baloch people also make up a minority in the eastern parts of Kerman, Razavi Khorasan, and South Khorasan (Khorasani Baloch) and are scattered throughout other provinces of Iran. They speak the Rakhshani and Sarawani dialects of Balochi, an Iranian language.

They mainly inhabit mountainous terrains, which have allowed them to maintain a distinct cultural identity and resist domination by neighbouring rulers.

Approximately 20–25% of the Baloch population live in Iran. Estimates of the Iranian Baloch population range from 2.5 to 4 million

== Religion ==
The Baloch are predominantly Muslim, with the vast majority belonging to the Hanafi school of Sunni Islam, but there is also small proportion of Shia in Balochistan.

== Geography ==
Iranian Balochistan is characterized by rugged mountains, deserts, and arid plains. It forms part of the larger Balochistan region, which extends into Pakistan and Afghanistan. In Iran, the Baloch are divided into two groups: the Makrani and the Sarhadi. The cities such as Iranshahr, Chabahar, Nikshahr, Sarbaz, and Saravan are known as the Makran region, while Zahedan and Khash are known as the Sarhad.region.

Balochistan of Iran has been regarded as the most underdeveloped, desolate, and poorest region of the country. A 2024 report by the Majlis Research Center found Sistan and Baluchistan to be the country's most deprived province "by a significant margin." The government of Iran has been trying to reverse this situation by implementing new plans such as the creation of the Chabahar Free Trade Zone.

== Culture ==
Baloch playing street football, Kerman province

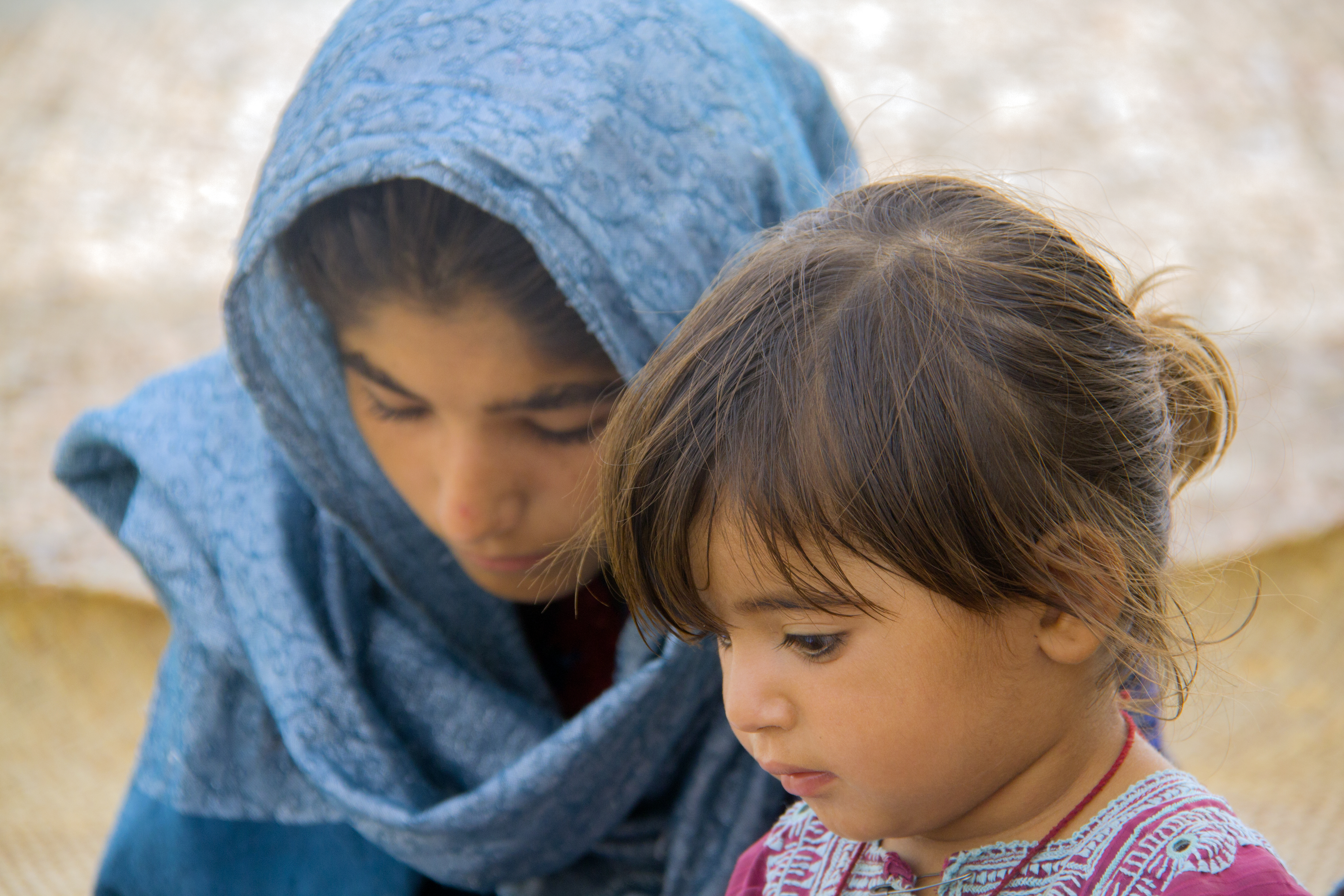
Two Baloch girls in Zahedan in the Sistan-Balochistan province of Iran.

Rug weaving is a common profession among the Baloch nomads of Khorasan. Balochi rugs, floor coverings made by the Baloch, are often sold widely in the carpet market and rug weaving industry of Iran.

The Baloch have their own dress code and have preserved the Baloch dress. Balochi needlework and Balochi handicrafts are the art of Baloch women in Iran. Among the most important centers of Balochi embroidery are Espakeh, Fanuj, Bampur, Irandegan, Marandegan, and Jaleq.

Balochi music is popular among the Baloch people of Iran, and many artists are active in this field.

== Notable people ==
- Shir-Mohammad Espandar, donali player
- Din Mohammad Zangshahi, musician
- Abd-ur-Rahmân Surizehi, musician
- Rostam Mirlashari, singer
- Abdolhamid Ismaeelzahi
- Mahtab Norouzi
- Fariba Balouch

== See also ==
- Khorasani Baloch
- Sistan and Baluchestan province
- Insurgency in Sistan and Balochistan
- Balochistan
  - Balochistan, Afghanistan
  - Balochistan, Pakistan
- Ethnic-based discrimination in Iran
