= Mirabad, Bampur =

Village in Sistan and Baluchestan province, Iran

Mirabad Persian: ميراباد
- Village
- Location within Iran
- Coordinates: 27°10′23″N 60°24′05″E
- Country: Iran
- Province: Sistan and Baluchestan
- County: Bampur
- District: Kalatan
- Rural District: Mirabad

Population (2016)
  - Total: 1,758
- Time zone: UTC+3:30 (IRST)

Mirabad (Persian: ميراباد) (Note: Also romanized as Mīrābād; also known as Mir Abad Bampoor) is a village in, and the capital of, Mirabad Rural District of Kalatan District, Bampur County, Sistan and Baluchestan province, Iran.

== Demographics ==
=== Population ===
At the time of the 2006 National census, the village's population was 1,432 in 264 households, when it was in Bampur-e Gharbi Rural District of the former Bampur District of Iranshahr County. The following census in 2011 counted 1,772 people in 415 households. The 2016 census measured the population of the village as 1,758 people in 463 households.

In 2017, the district was separated from the county in the establishment of Bampur County, and the rural district was transferred to the new Kalatan District. Mirabad was transferred to Mirabad Rural District created in the district.
