= Sartakhti-ye Shahabad =

Sartakhti-ye Shahabad سرتختي شاه اباد
- Village
- Location within Iran
- Coordinates: 27°10′35″N 60°07′51″E
- Country: Iran
- Province: Sistan and Baluchestan
- County: Bampur
- Bakhsh: Central
- Rural District: Bampur-e Gharbi

Population (2006)
  - Total: 598
- Time zone: UTC+3:30 (IRST)
  - Summer (DST): UTC+4:30 (IRDT)

Sartakhti-ye Shahabad (Persian: سرتختي شاه اباد, also Romanized as Sartakhtī-ye Shāhābād; also known as Sartakhtī) is a village in Bampur-e Gharbi Rural District, in the Central District of Bampur County, Sistan and Baluchestan Province, Iran. At the 2006 census, its population was 598, in 118 families.
