= Kheyrabad, Bampur =

Village in Sistan and Baluchestan province, Iran

Kheyrabad Persian: خيراباد
- Village
- Location within Iran
- Coordinates: 27°10′41″N 60°26′54″E
- Country: Iran
- Province: Sistan and Baluchestan
- County: Bampur
- District: Central
- Rural District: Kheyrabad

Population (2016)
  - Total: 2,122
- Time zone: UTC+3:30 (IRST)

Kheyrabad (Persian: خيراباد) (Note: Also romanized as Kheyrābād; also known as Ḩeydarābād) is a village in, and the capital of, Kheyrabad Rural District of the Central District of Bampur County, Sistan and Baluchestan province, Iran.

== Demographics ==
=== Population ===
At the time of the 2006 National Census, the village's population was 1,845 in 400 households, when it was in Bampur-e Sharqi Rural District of the former Bampur District of Iranshahr County. The following census in 2011 counted 2,173 people in 526 households. The 2016 census measured the population of the village as 2,122 people in 548 households.

In 2017, the district was separated from the county in the establishment of Bampur County, and the rural district was transferred to the new Central District. Kheyrabad was transferred to Kheyrabad Rural District created in the district.
