= Karim Naruyi Kingi =

Karim Naruyi Kingi كريم ناروئي كينگي
- Village
- Country: Iran
- Province: Sistan and Baluchestan
- County: Bampur
- Bakhsh: Central
- Rural District: Bampur-e Gharbi

Population (2006)
  - Total: 34
- Time zone: UTC+3:30 (IRST)
  - Summer (DST): UTC+4:30 (IRDT)

Karim Naruyi Kingi (Persian: كريم ناروئي كينگي, also Romanized as Karīm Nārūyī Kīngī) is a village in Bampur-e Gharbi Rural District, Central District, Bampur County, Sistan and Baluchestan Province, Iran. At the 2006 census, its population was 34, in 6 families.
