= Turdan =

Turdan توردان
- Village
- Location within Iran
- Coordinates: 27°11′16″N 60°25′58″E
- Country: Iran
- Province: Sistan and Baluchestan
- County: Bampur
- Bakhsh: Central
- Rural District: Bampur-e Gharbi

Population (2006)
  - Total: 2,008
- Time zone: UTC+3:30 (IRST)
  - Summer (DST): UTC+4:30 (IRDT)

Turdan (Persian: توردان, also Romanized as Tūrdān, Toor Dan, and Ţūrdān) is a village in Bampur-e Gharbi Rural District, in the Central District of Bampur County, Sistan and Baluchestan Province, Iran. At the 2006 census, its population was 2,008, in 371 families.
