= Peshkabad =

Village in Sistan and Baluchestan province, Iran

Peshkabad Persian: پشك اباد
- Village
- Location within Iran
- Coordinates: 27°10′28″N 60°17′54″E
- Country: Iran
- Province: Sistan and Baluchestan
- County: Bampur
- District: Kalatan
- Rural District: Bampur-e Gharbi

Population (2016)
  - Total: 2,815
- Time zone: UTC+3:30 (IRST)

Peshkabad (Persian: پشك اباد) (Note: Also romanized as Peshkābād; also known as Beshekābād, Beskekābād, Jaʿfarābād, Pīshak Ābād, Pīshekābād, and Pīshokābād) is a village in Bampur-e Gharbi Rural District of Kalatan District, Bampur County, Sistan and Baluchestan province, Iran.

== Demographics ==
=== Population ===
At the time of the 2006 National Census, the village's population was 2,588 in 495 households, when it was in the former Bampur District of Iranshahr County. The following census in 2011 counted 2,760 people in 611 households. The 2016 census measured the population of the village as 2,815 people in 686 households. It was the most populous village in its rural district.

In 2017, the district was separated from the county in the establishment of Bampur County, and the rural district was transferred to the new Kalatan District.
