= Seyyedabad, Bampur =

Seyyedabad سيداباد
- Village
- Location within Iran
- Coordinates: 27°10′08″N 60°22′34″E
- Country: Iran
- Province: Sistan and Baluchestan
- County: Bampur
- Bakhsh: Central
- Rural District: Bampur-e Gharbi

Population (2006)
  - Total: 1,153
- Time zone: UTC+3:30 (IRST)
  - Summer (DST): UTC+4:30 (IRDT)

Seyyedabad (Persian: سيداباد, also Romanized as Seyyedābād; also known as Sa‘īdābād and Saiyidābād) is a village in Bampur-e Gharbi Rural District, in the Central District of Bampur County, Sistan and Baluchestan Province, Iran. At the 2006 census, its population was 1,153, in 244 families.
