= Bampur Castle =

Iranian national heritage site

Coordinates: 27.2012959°N 60.4473626°E

Bampur Fortress
- قلعه بمپور
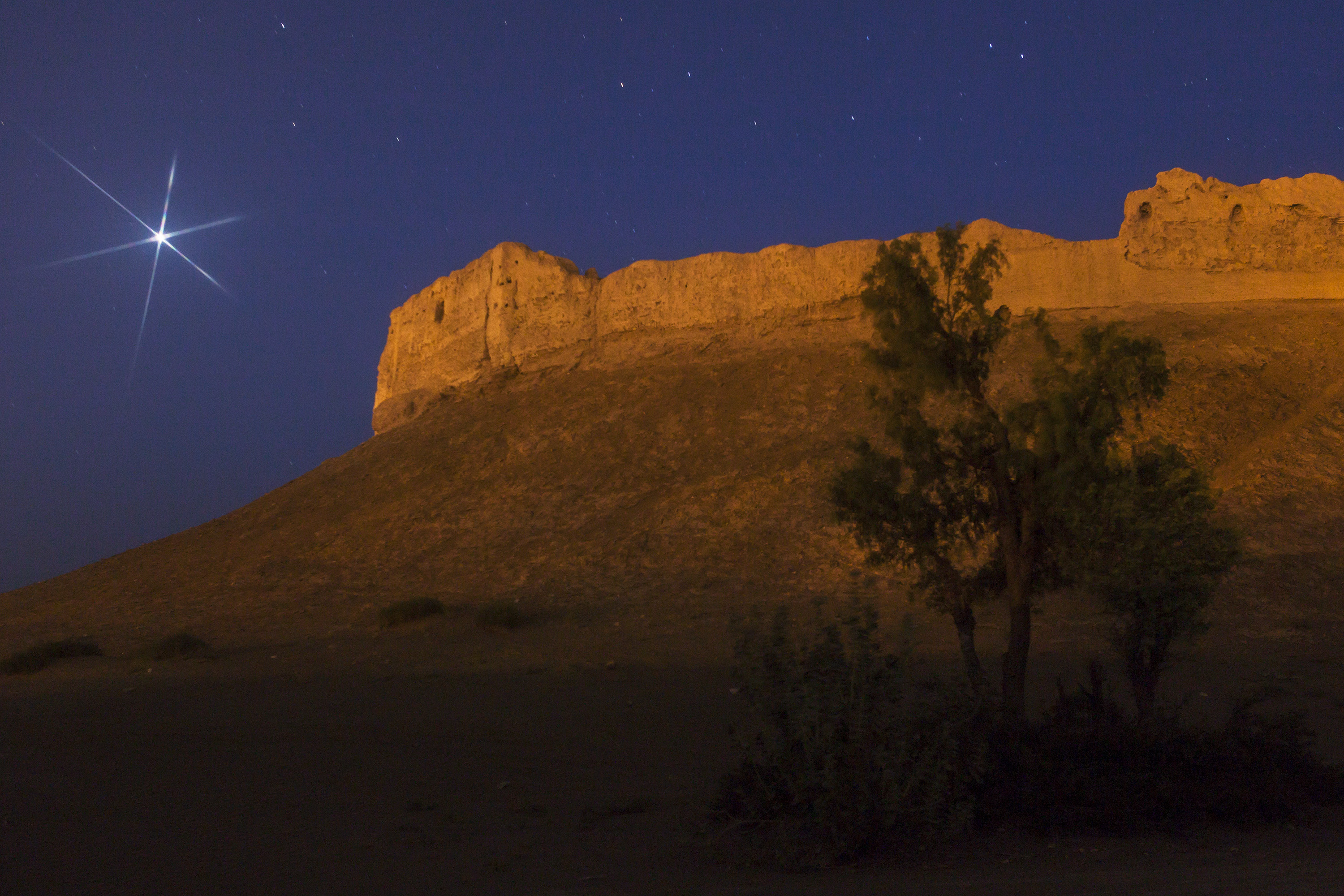

General information
- Type: Castle
- Location: Bampur, Iran
- Renovation cost

Iran National Heritage List
- Official name: Bampur Fortress
- Type: Fortress
- Designated: 1966
- Reference no.: 559
- Conservation organization: Cultural Heritage, Handicrafts and Tourism Organization of Iran

Bampur Fortress (Persian: قلعه بمپور) is a historical castle located in Bampur County in Sistan and Baluchestan Province, The longevity of this fortress dates back to the Sasanian Empire.
