= Kheyrabad Rural District (Bampur County) =

Rural district in Sistan and Baluchestan province, Iran

Kheyrabad Rural District Persian: دهستان خیرآباد
- Rural District
- Location within Iran
- Coordinates: 27°11′07″N 60°28′12″E
- Country: Iran
- Province: Sistan and Baluchestan
- County: Bampur
- District: Central
- Capital: Kheyrabad
- Time zone: UTC+3:30 (IRST)

Kheyrabad Rural District (Persian: دهستان خیرآباد) is in the Central District of Bampur County, Sistan and Baluchestan province, Iran. Its capital is the village of Kheyrabad, whose population at the time of the 2016 National Census was 2,122 people in 548 households.

In 2017, Bampur District was separated from Iranshahr County in the establishment of Bampur County, and Kheyrabad Rural District was created in the new Central District.
