= Mirabad Rural District =

Rural district in Sistan and Baluchestan province, Iran

Mirabad Rural District Persian: دهستان میرآباد
- Rural District
- Location within Iran
- Coordinates: 27°16′30″N 60°16′48″E
- Country: Iran
- Province: Sistan and Baluchestan
- County: Bampur
- District: Kalatan
- Capital: Mirabad
- Time zone: UTC+3:30 (IRST)

Mirabad Rural District (Persian: دهستان میرآباد) is in Kalatan District of Bampur County, Sistan and Baluchestan province, Iran. Its capital is the village of Mirabad, whose population at the time of the 2016 National Census was 1,758 people in 463 households.

== History ==
In 2017, Bampur District was separated from Iranshahr County in the establishment of Bampur County, and Mirabad Rural District was created in the new Kalatan District.
