= Qasemabad, Bampur =

City in Sistan and Baluchestan province, Iran

Qasemabad Persian: قاسم اباد
- City
- Location within Iran
- Coordinates: 27°10′36″N 60°19′29″E
- Country: Iran
- Province: Sistan and Baluchestan
- County: Bampur
- District: Kalatan

Population (2016)
  - Total: 1,845
- Time zone: UTC+3:30 (IRST)

Qasemabad (Persian: قاسم اباد) (Note: Also romanized as Qāsemābād; also known as Qāsemābād-e Pā’īn and Qāsimabad) is a city in, and the capital of, Kalatan District of Bampur County, Sistan and Baluchestan province, Iran. It also serves as the administrative center for Bampur-e Gharbi Rural District.

== Demographics ==
=== Population ===
At the time of the 2006 National Census, Qasemabad's population was 2,196 in 450 households, when it was a village in Bampur-e Gharbi Rural District of the former Bampur District of Iranshahr County. The following census in 2011 counted 2,073 people in 490 households. The 2016 census measured the population of the village as 1,845 people in 467 households.

In 2017, the district was separated from the county in the establishment of Bampur County, and the rural district was transferred to the new Kalatan District. In 2021, Qasemabad was elevated to the status of a city.

== Notable people ==
Mahtab Norouzi was from Qasemabad and she was a master artisan at traditional Baluchi needlework and embroidery for more than 50 years.
