= Balochi clothing =

Clothing of the people of Baluchistan

Balochi clothing (Balochi: بلۏچی گد, romanized: Balòči gòd) is a historical and contemporary aspect of Baloch heritage and deep association between the traditional dress and ethnic identity.

The clothing of the Baloch people consists of various styles of kameez and shalwar, turban, shoes, and head scarfs. Balochi embroidery decorations on dresses is a tradition in Balochi culture including Baloch cap, jackets, belts, purse, shoulder bags, and various other items.

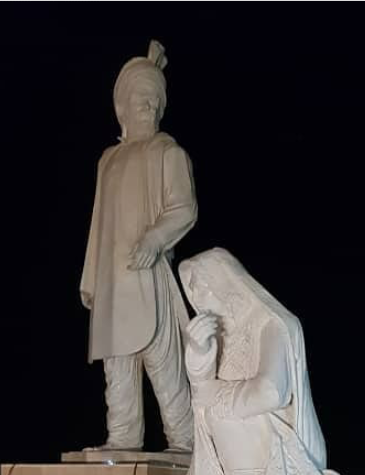
Statue of a Baloch man and woman in Zahedan, Iran

== History ==
Dress code and personal upkeep are particularly high among the cultural values of the Baloch people. The Balochi dress resemble the ancient Parthian equivalent. Surprisingly, no significant changes can be observed in the Balochi dress since ancient history.

Balochi clothing is derived from Parthian clothing, especially Balocih men's pants are very wide like Parthian pants, but narrow near the hem, and twisting causes folds in it.

The Baloch have worn their traditional clothing since ancient times, and this clothing was spread beyond the borders of Balochistan by ancient dynasties. The similarity of the clothing of Baloch men with other geographical regions such as India is as a result of the power of the Iranian ancient dynasties.

Balochi needlework, is a type of Balochi handicraft which is used on Baloch women's clothing—in some sources—the beginning of this art is 100 to 200 years prior to Islam, and the available evidence indicates that this method of sewing has been common among the Baloch people since the beginning of Islam, and in the Ilkhanate era—especially the Timurid and Safavid eras—has reached its peak.

== Men's dress ==
Baloch men wear a dress named jameh or jamak. It consists of two parts; one is upper body clothing and the other is a loose skirt reaching to the knee. The trouser (shalwar) is approximately 2.2 m wide.

The men's shalwar kameez consists of a very baggy shalwar troser which uses large lengths of cloth. The kameez is also loose, which traditionally is long with long sleeves.

Chakan doz is a hand-embroidered hat of the nobles, this type of hat is made of fabric on which needlework is done.

Shal (شال) is a woolen coat worn in winter.

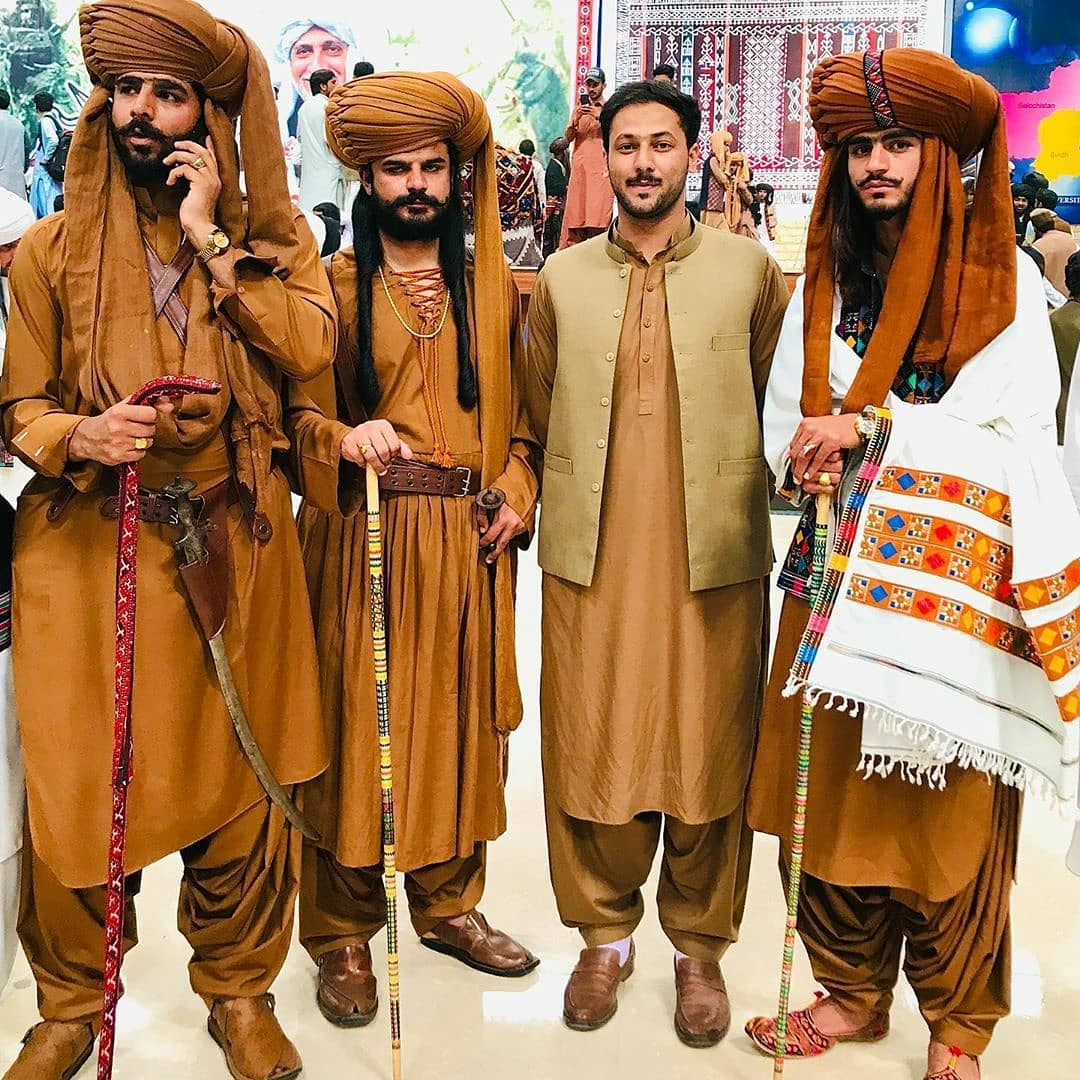
A group of Baloch men wearing traditional Balochi male dress

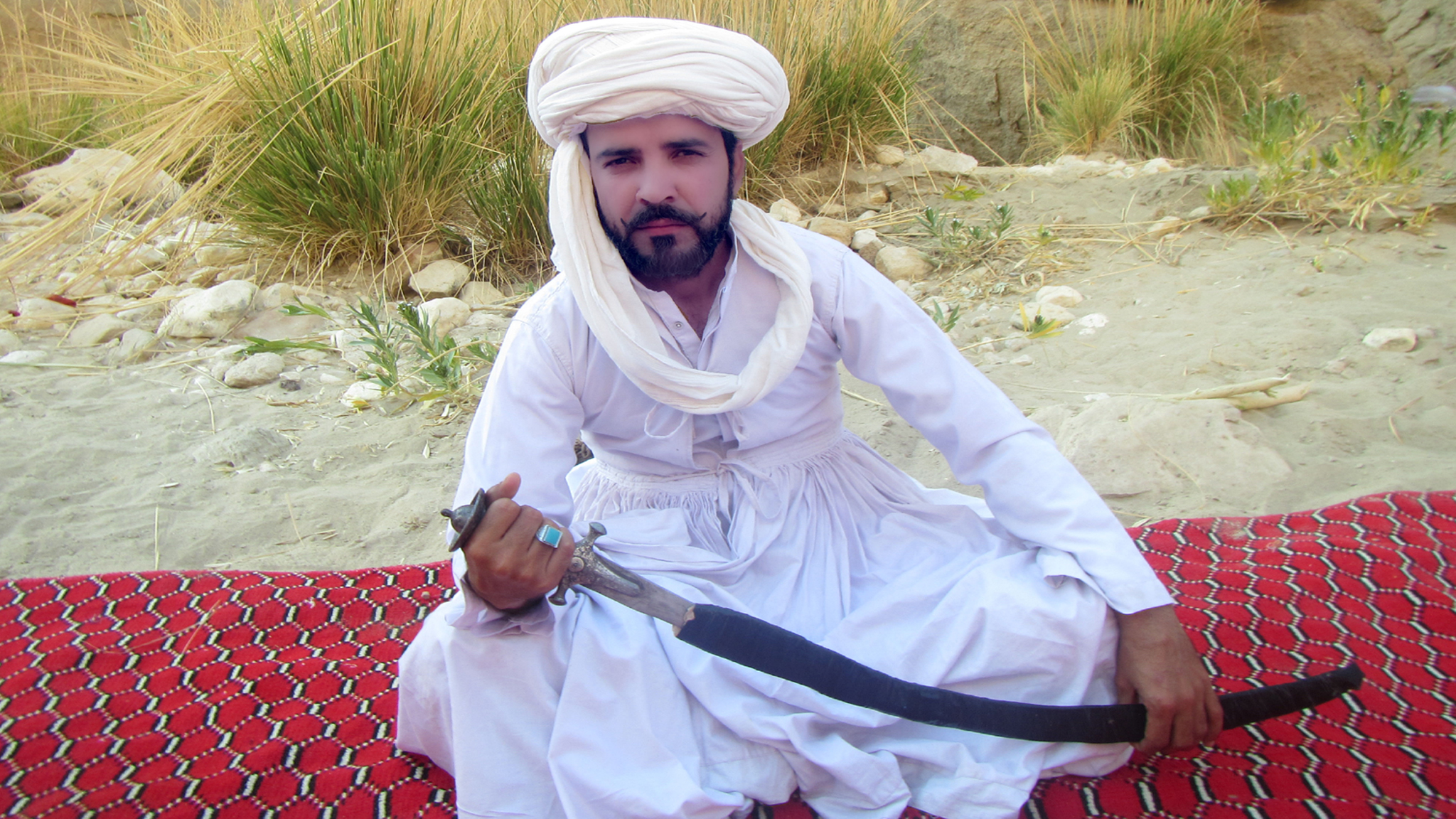
Man wearing Balochi tradition cloth

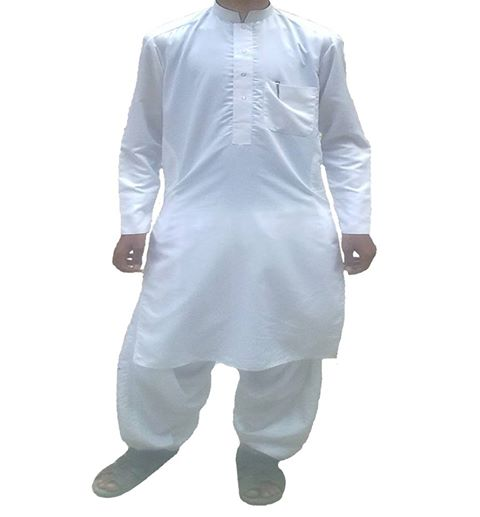
Traditional Balochi white shalwar kameez

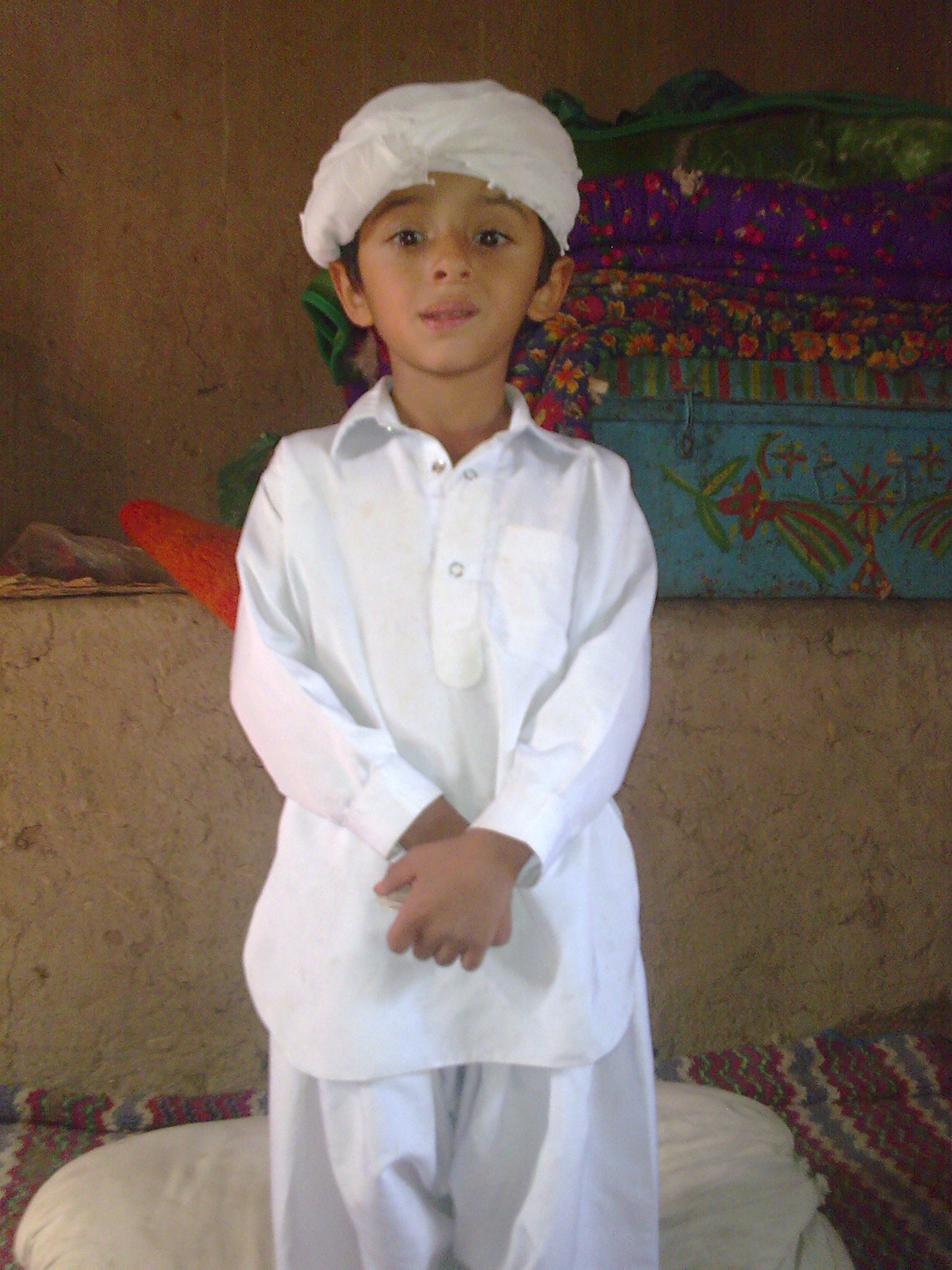
Baloch child in Balochi men's clothes

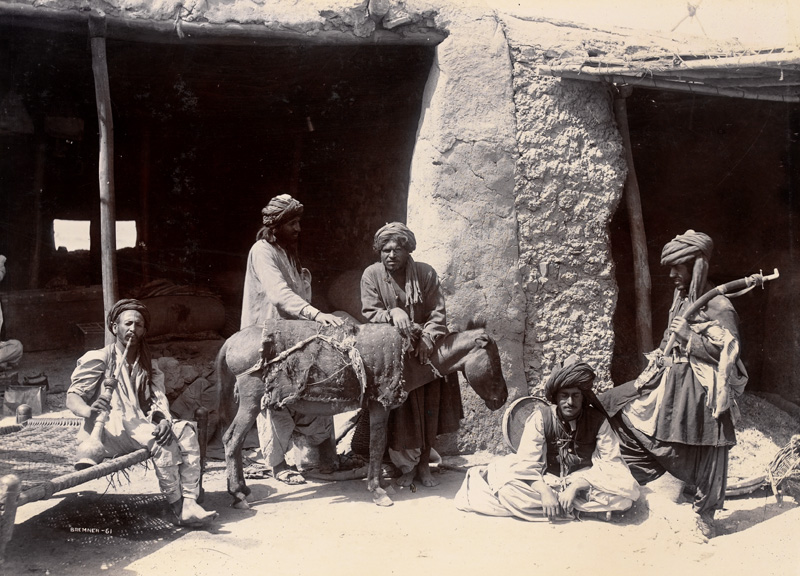
Baloch men in shalwar kameez, Quetta c. 1867

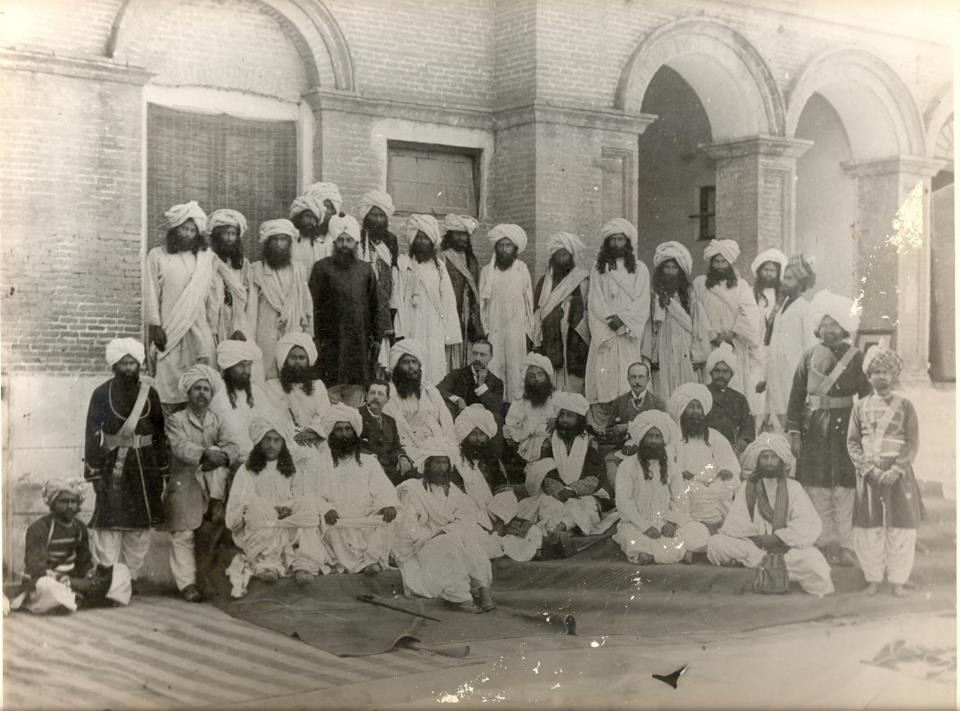
Tribal elders, April 1896

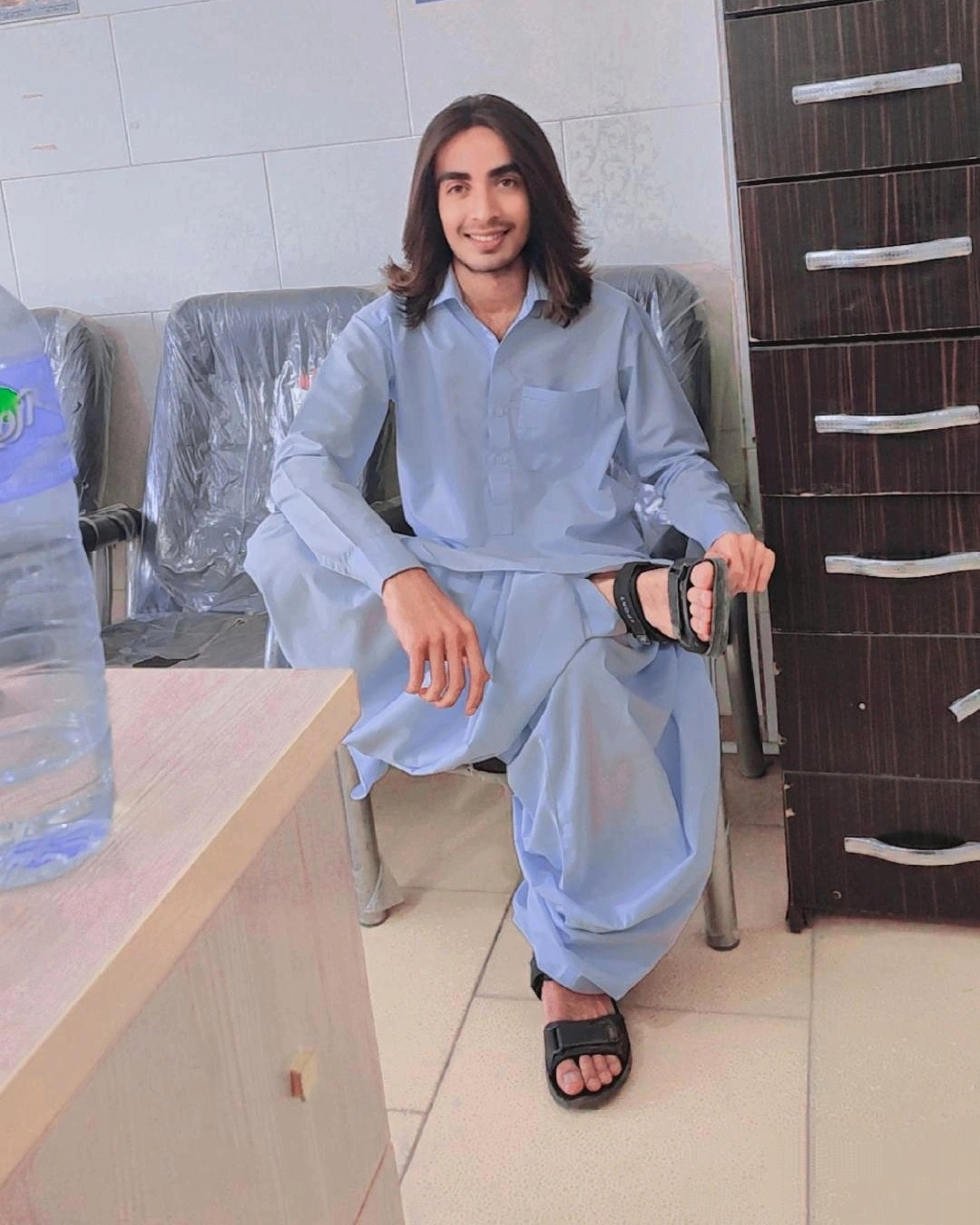
Baloch man in traditional Balochi men's clothes

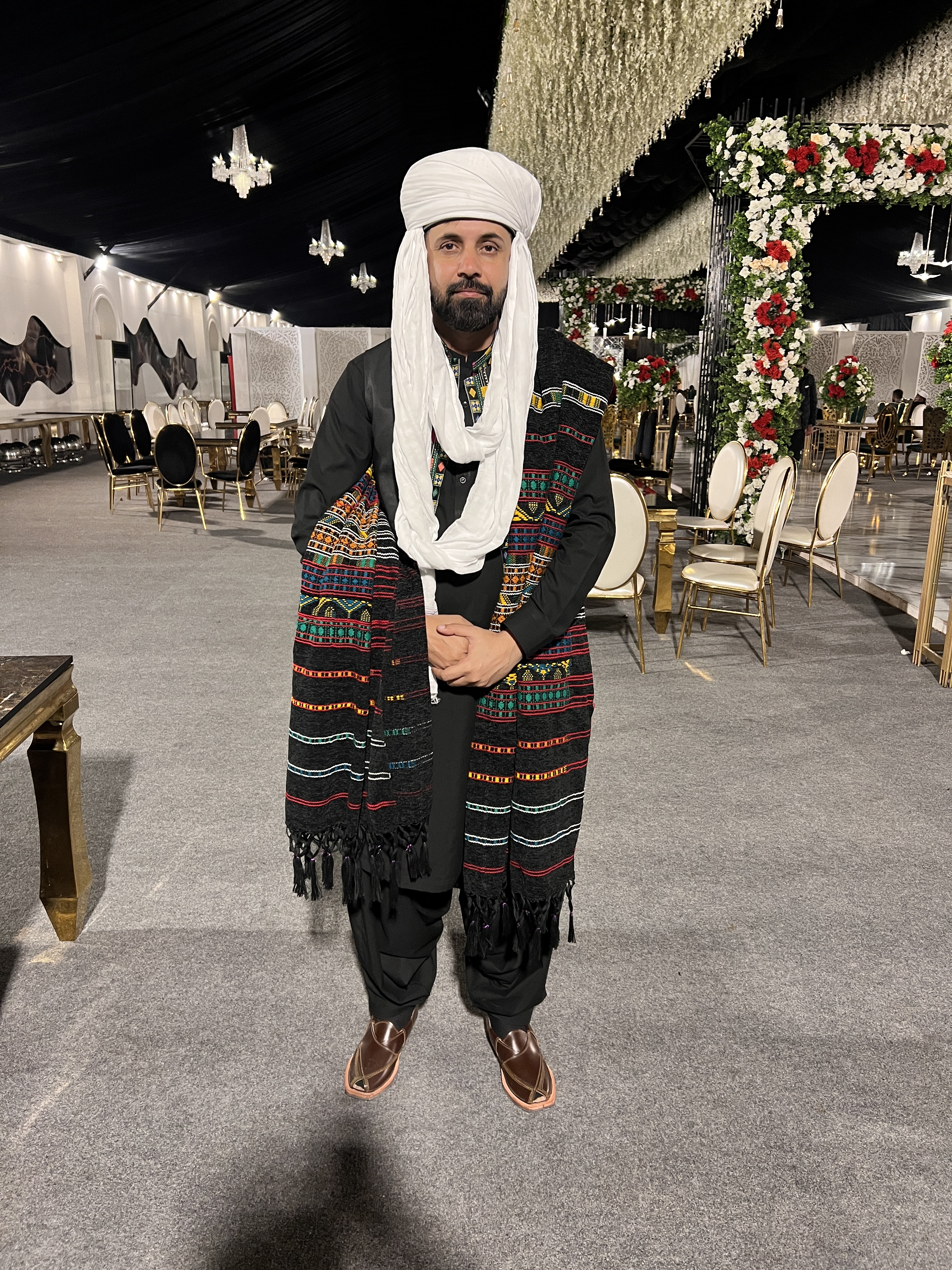
Baloch man in traditional Balochi men's clothes

== Women's dress ==
The female Balochi suit consists of the head scarf, long dress, and a shalwar (pajamak). Traditional Baloch women wear loose dresses which are Balochi needlework and embroidered in local designs which include Balochi silk-thread chain-stitch embroidery.

Mahtab Norouzi was an Baloch Iranian master artisan, she was known for her textiles and women's clothing.

- Serig: A kind of large rectangular scarf that is decorated with embroidery
- Footwear: Traditional women's footwear use four types of shoes, namely sawas, mochi, katuk, and takkul.
- Balochi embroidery alone has 118 different basic designs.
- Baloch women use a large scarf to cover their heads called a sareg.
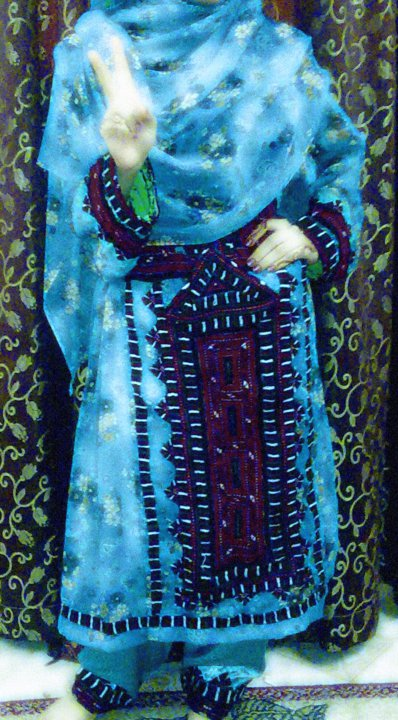
Baloch women's traditional dress

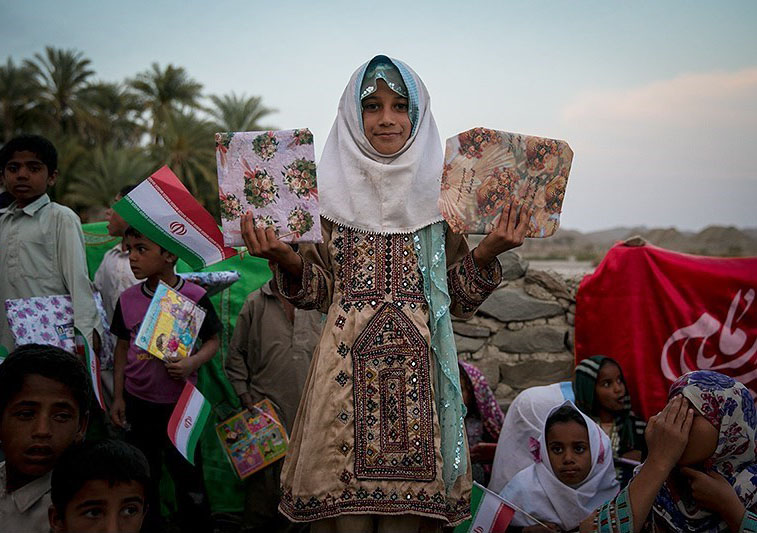
Baloch girl with other children in Sistan-Baluchestan

Baloch dress with traditional Balochi embroidery

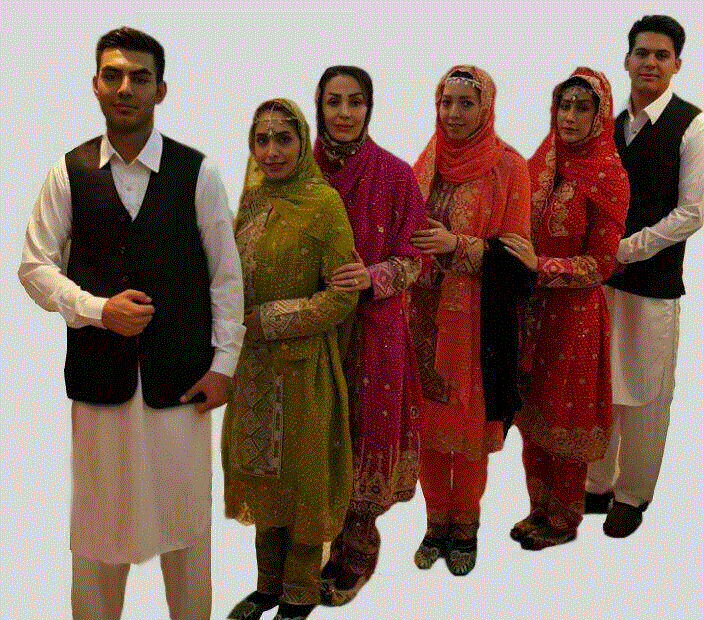
Illustration of Baloch traditional dress

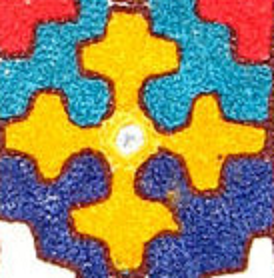
Balochi embroidery

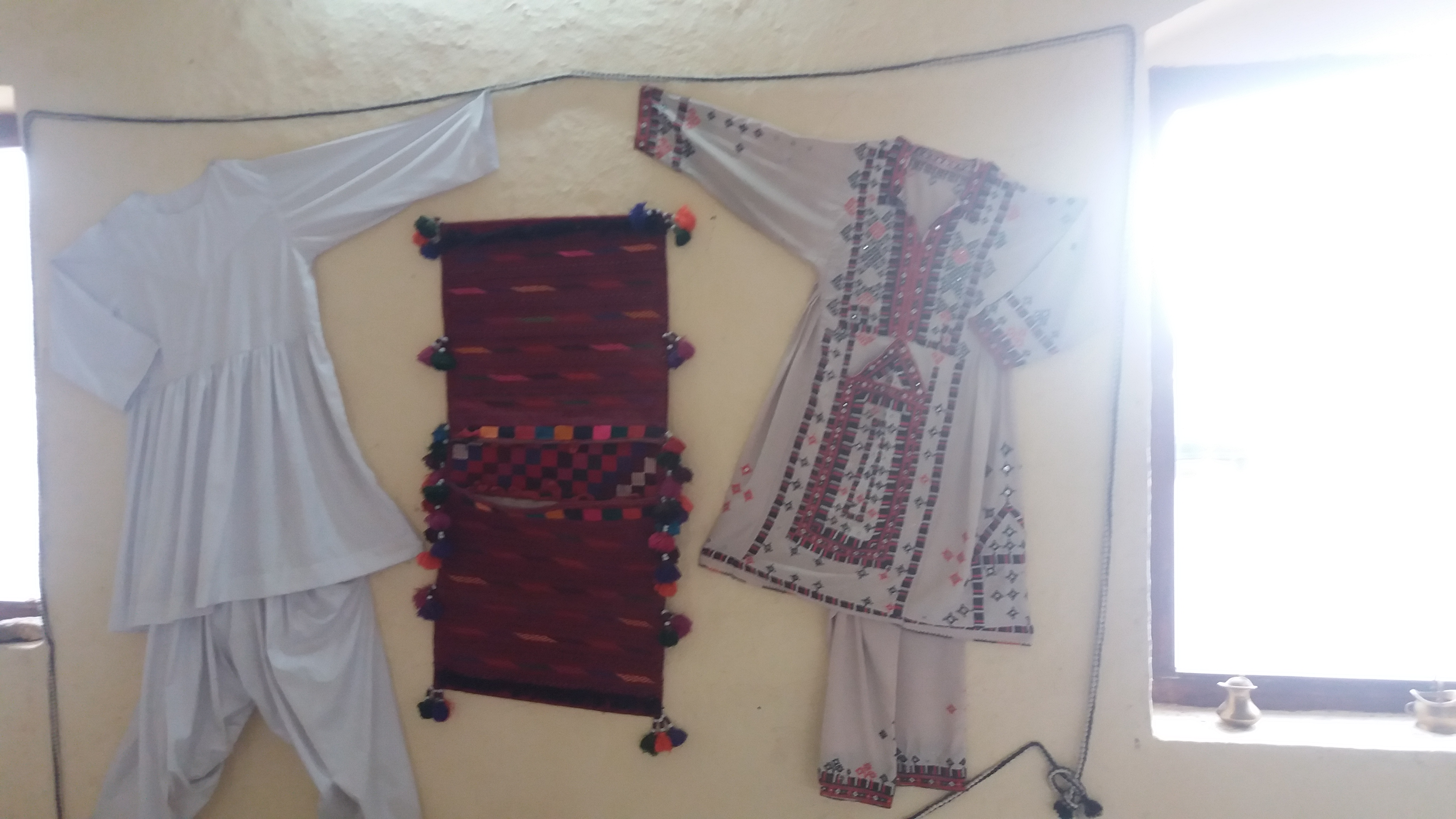
Traditional Balochi dresses hanging to dry

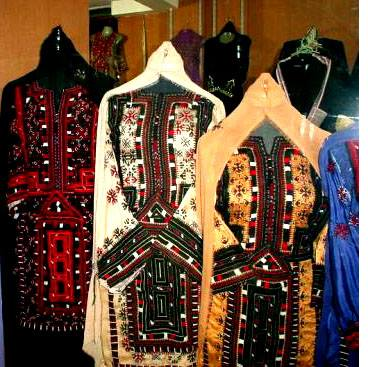
Needlework of Baloch women's clothes

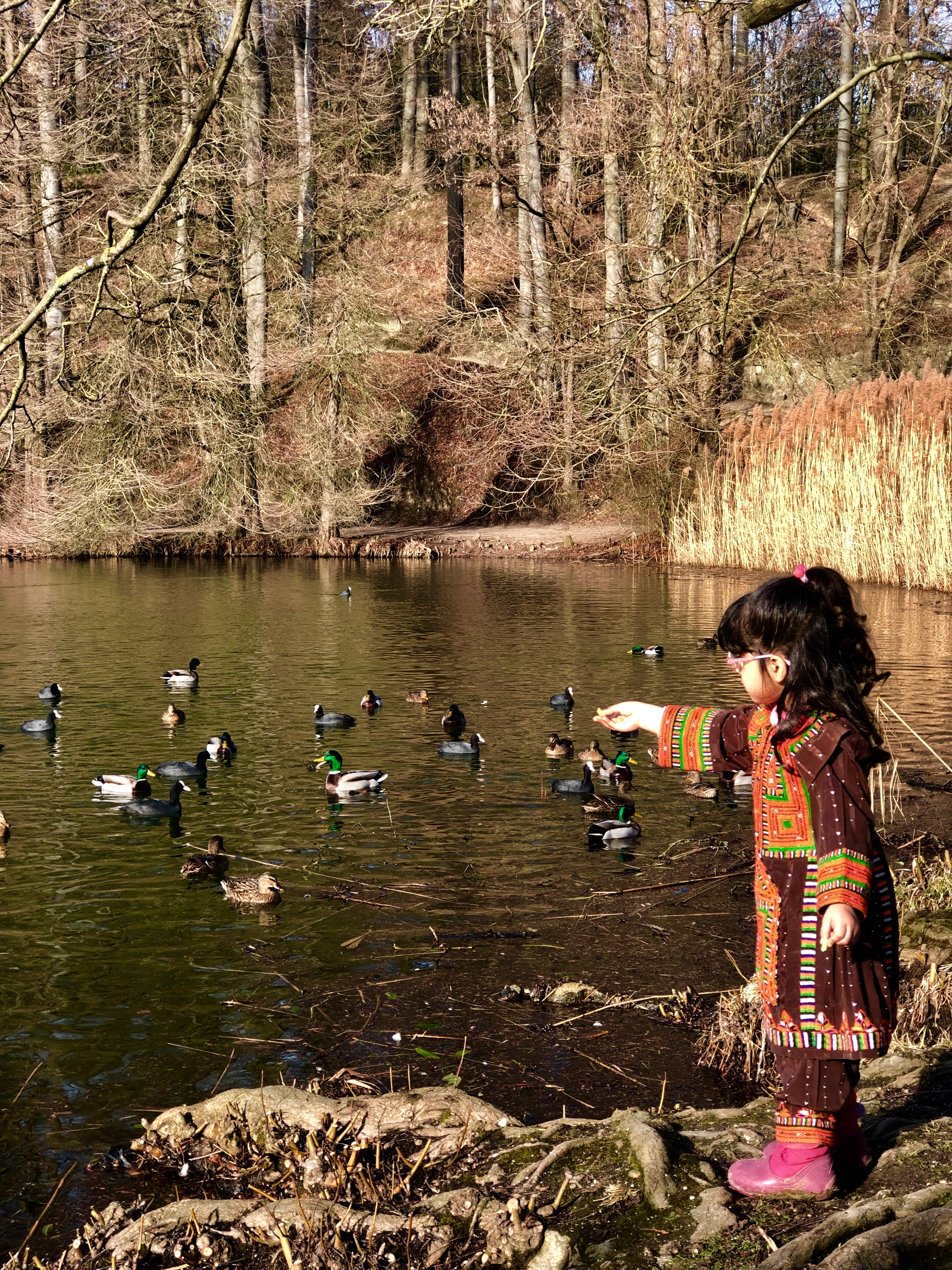
Baloch girl in Balochi dress next to a lake

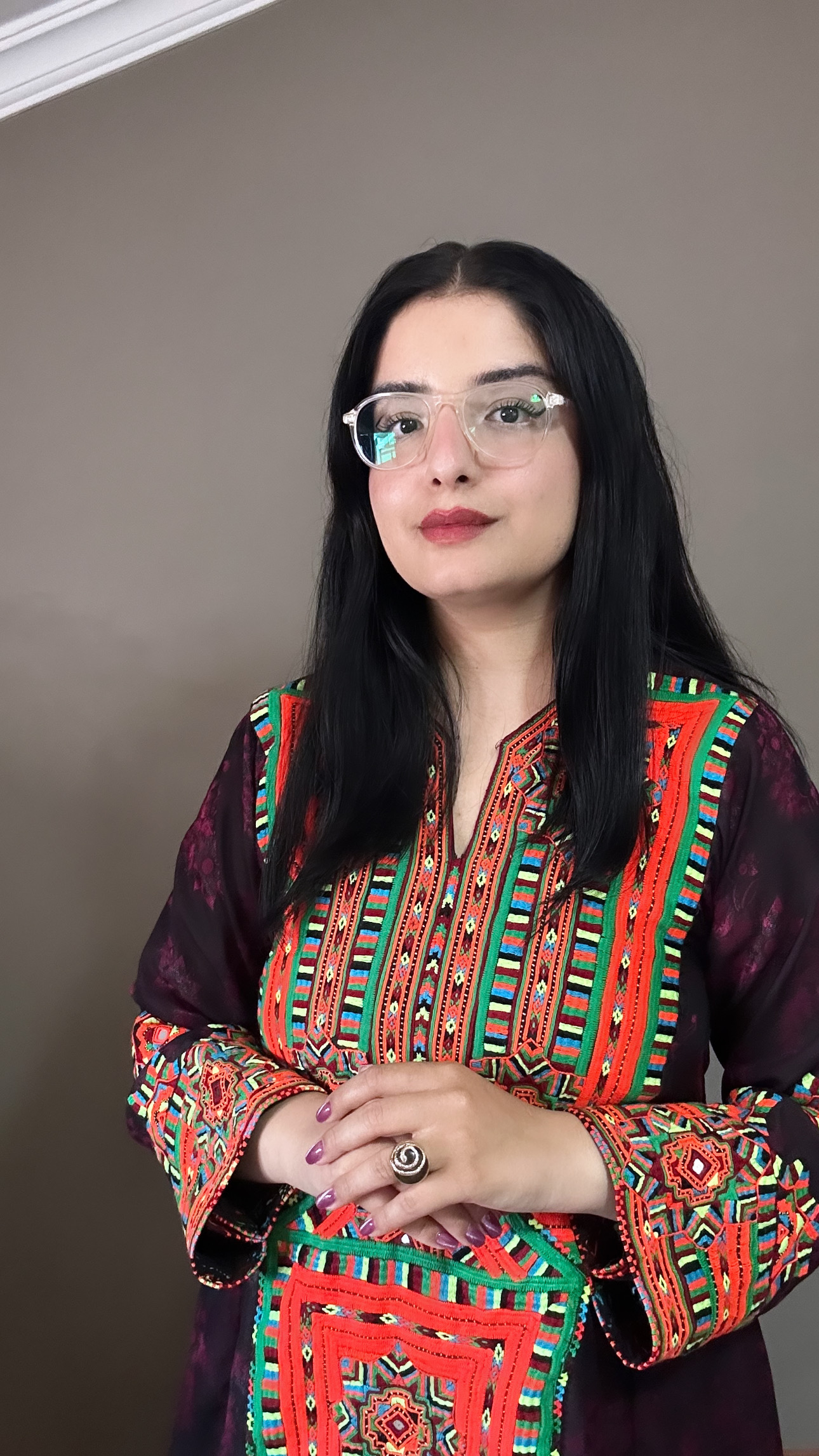
Baloch women in traditional Balochi dress

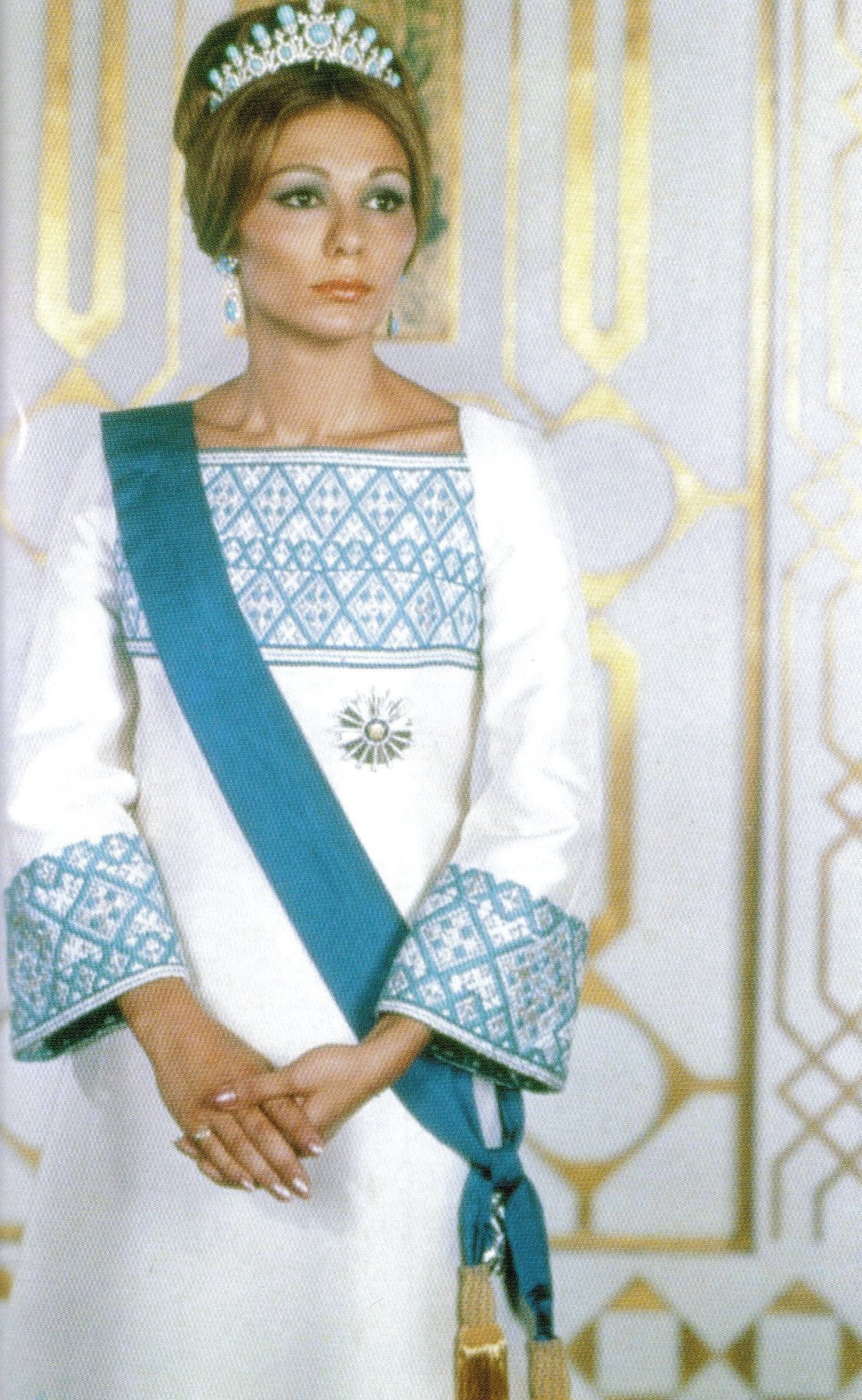
Farah Pahlavi, wearing Balochi needlework by Mahtab Norouzi

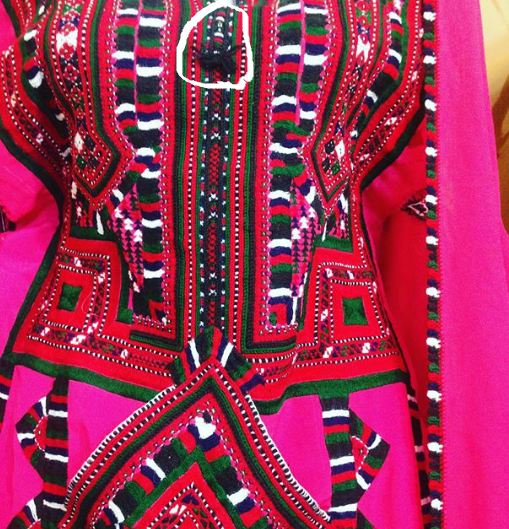
Traditional Balochi women's dress

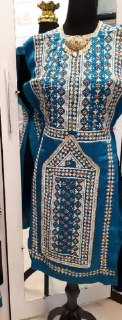
Traditional Balochi needlework dress

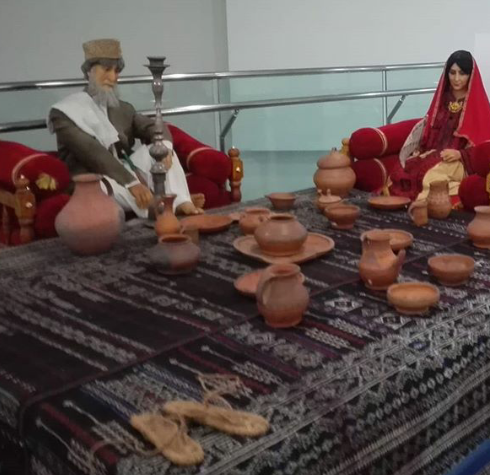
Baloch men and women, South East Museum, Zahedan, Iran

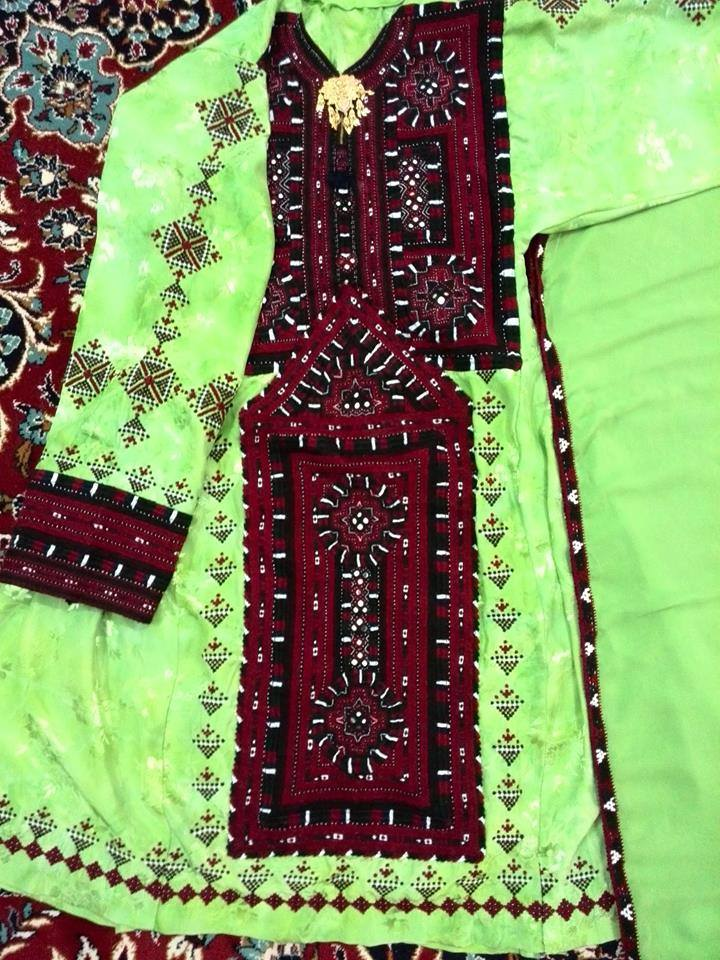
Green traditional Baloch women's dress

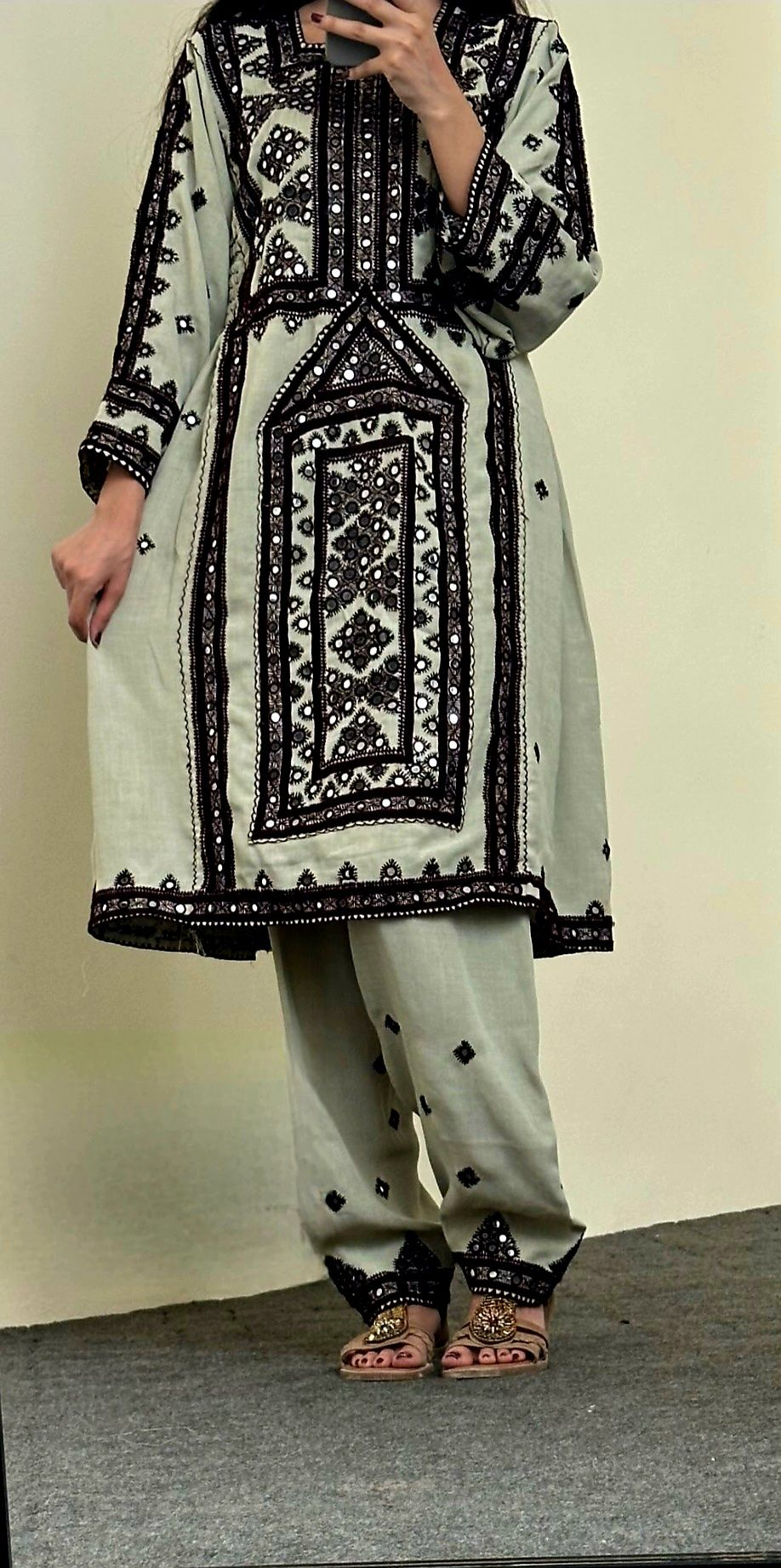
Siah Dozi, wearing the traditional dress of Baloch women

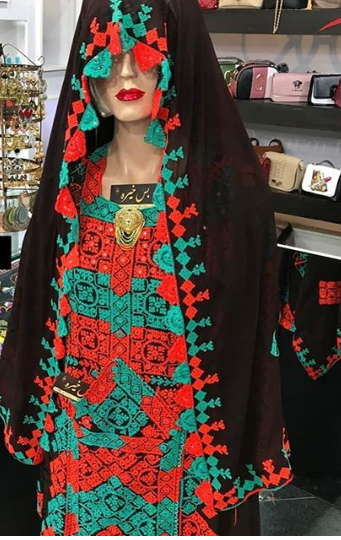
Baloch women's dress on a mannequin

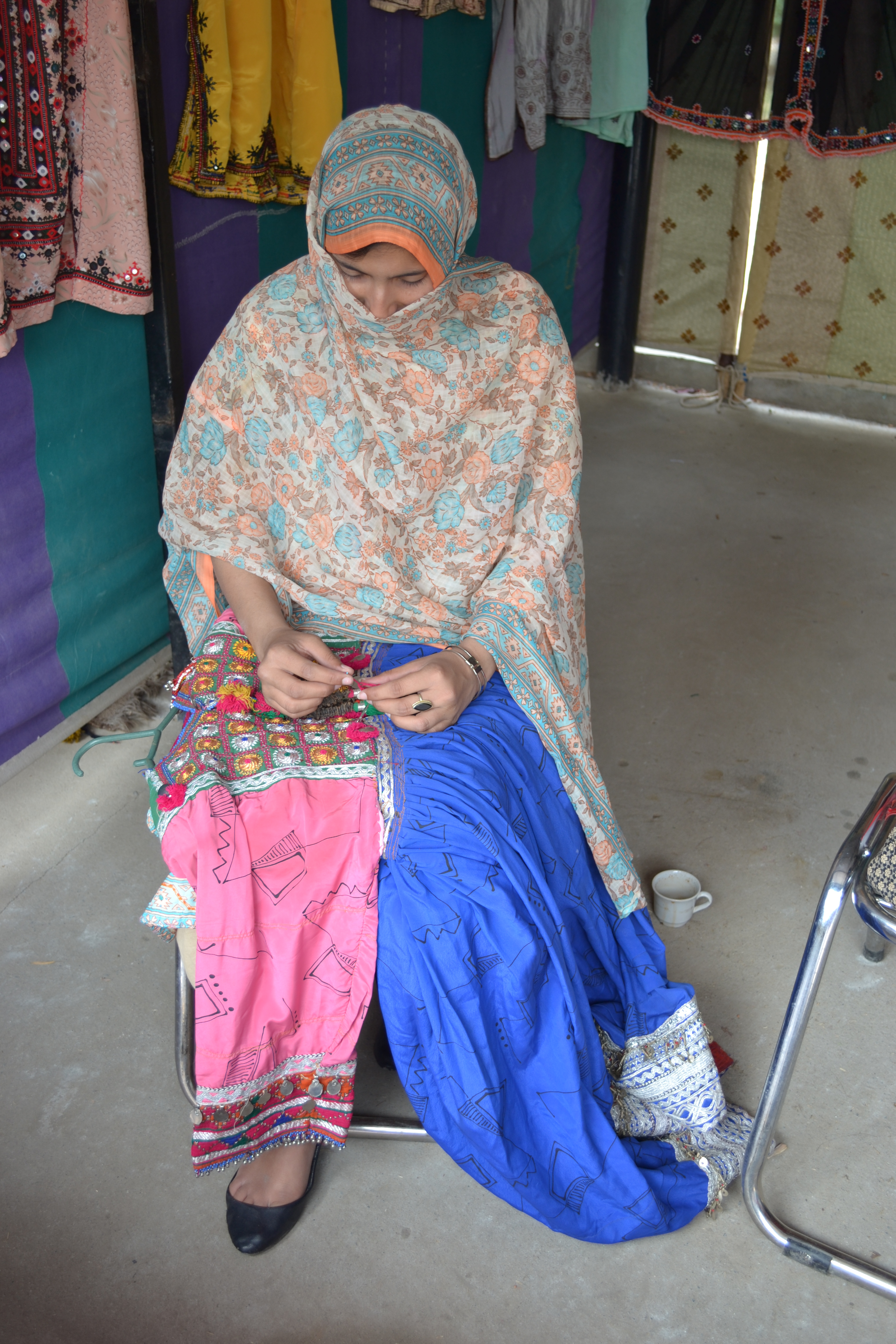
Pakistani Baloch women engaged in needlework

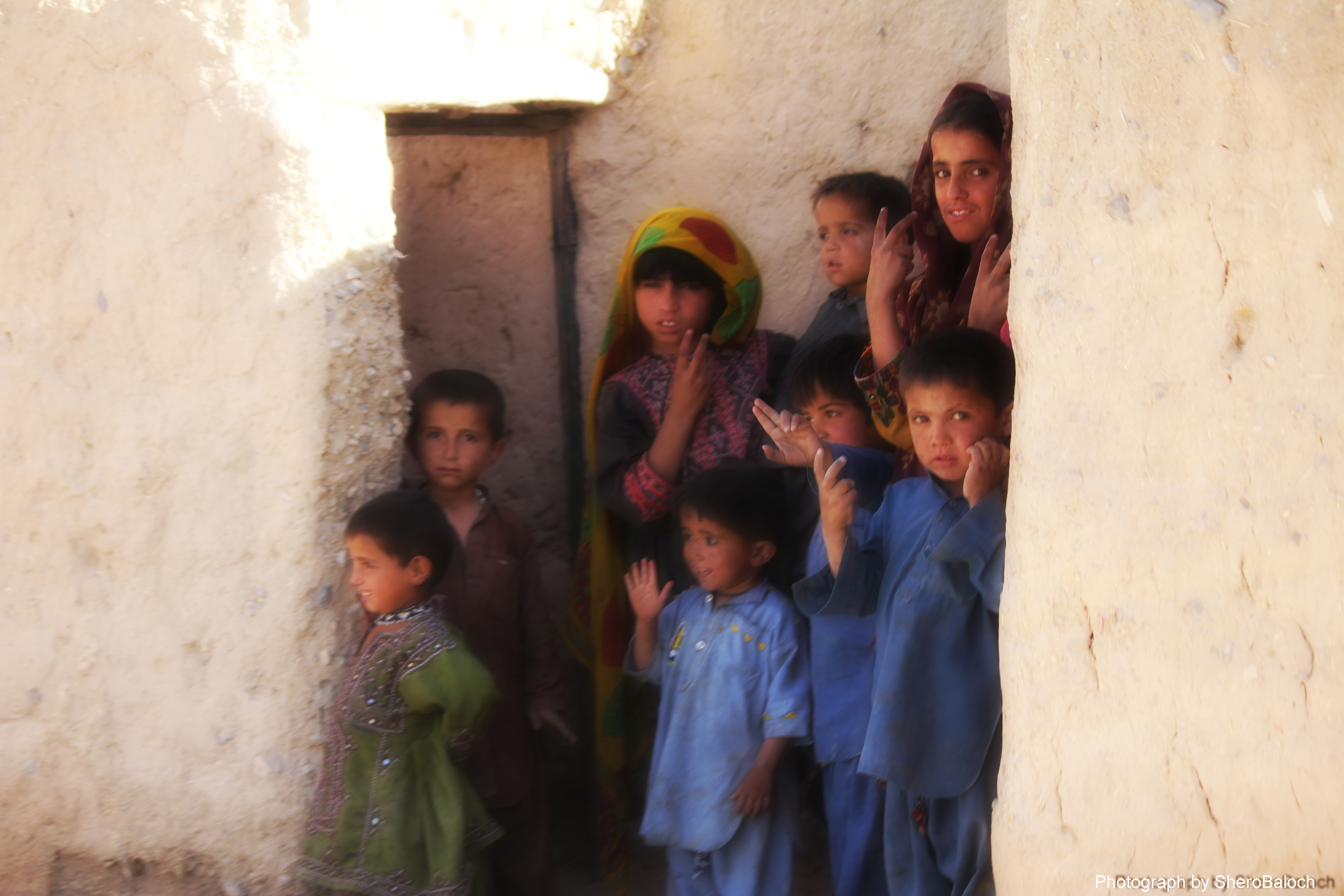
Children in Quetta wearing local embroidery designs

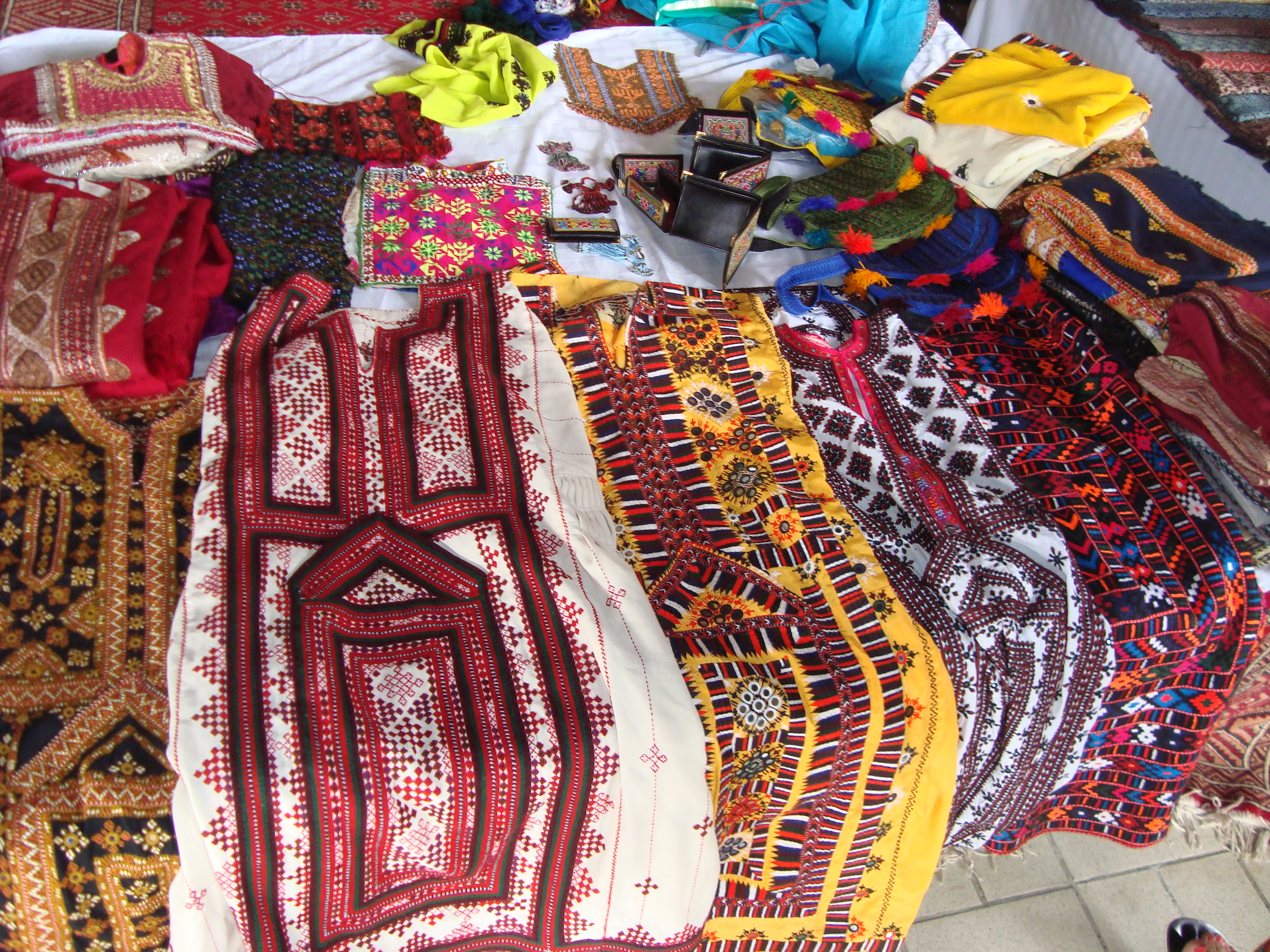
Traditional Balochi dresses for sale

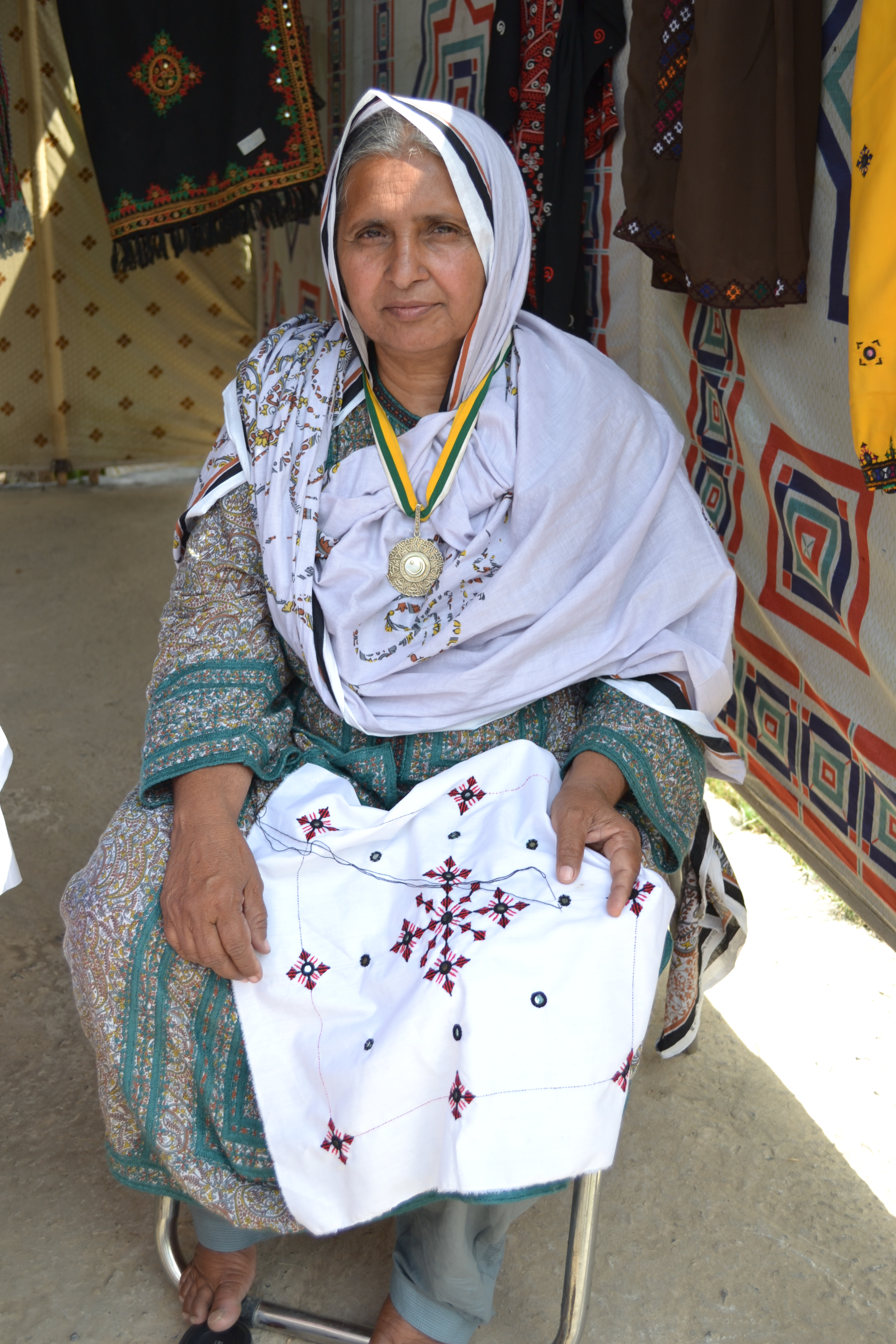
Elderly Baloch women in traditional dress

== Ornaments and jewelry ==
Gold ornaments such as necklaces and bracelets are an important aspect of Baloch women's traditions and among their most favoured items of jewelry are called dorr, heavy earrings that are fastened to the head with gold chains so that the heavy weight will not cause harm to the ears. They usually wear a gold brooch (tasni) that is made by local jewelers in different shapes and sizes and is used to fasten the two parts of the dress together over the chest.

Balochi ornaments are used for head and hair, ears, hands and feet

- Broch (بروچ): An ornament tied in the front breast pocket
- Earrings (در): Usually worn on the ears and nose
- Pulu (پلۏ) and puluk (پلۏک): An ornament placed in the nostril with a clip
- Haar (هر) and toq (توق): A necklace and bracelet respectively
- Sangah (سانگہ) or tali (تلی): Both used as rings
- Mundrik (مندریک): Rings put on fingers
- Armlets (باهوبند): Jewelry put on arms
- Roch (روچ): An ornament hung on the chest
- Gab (گب): A silver bangle
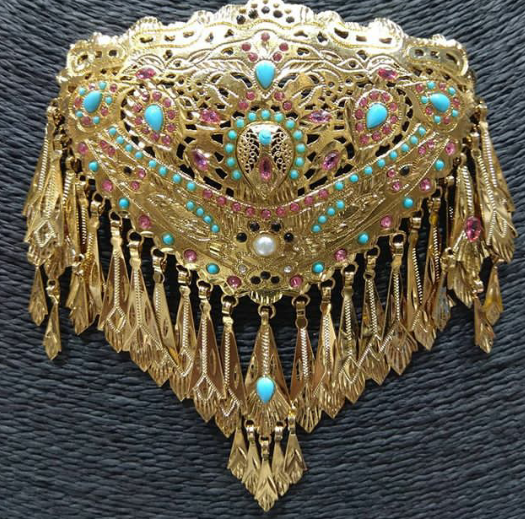
Senjak or tasni

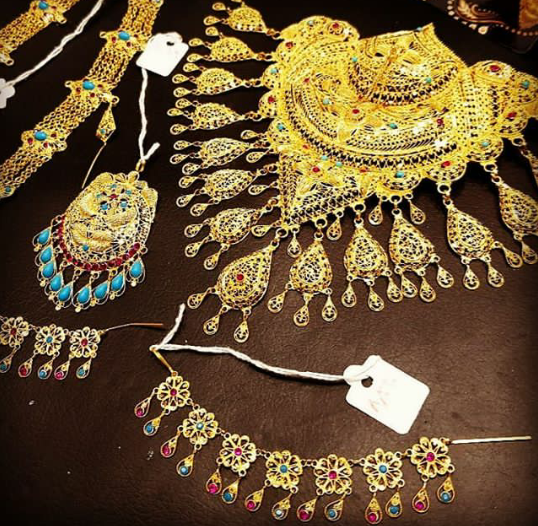
Balochi jewelry for sale

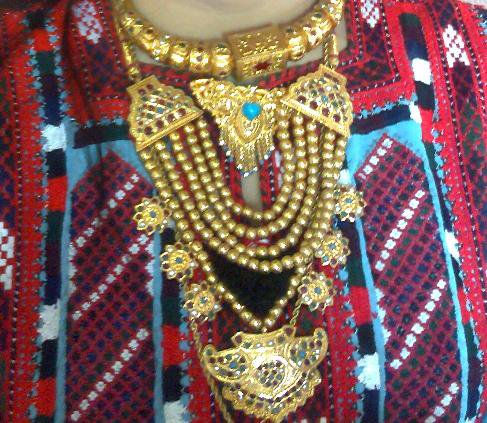
Baloch women's golden necklace

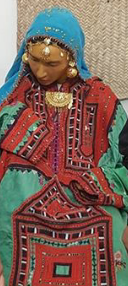
Baloch woman wearing various Balochi ornaments

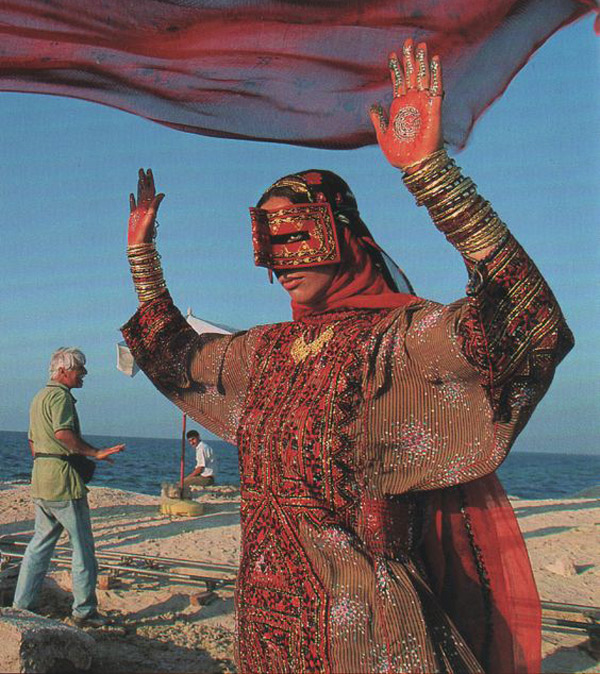
Baloch woman outdoors wearing Balochi jewelry

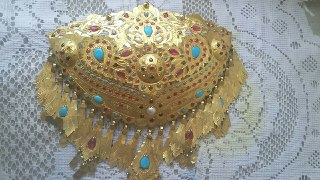
Baloch brooch

== Turban ==
Men traditionally wear various styles of the turban known as the paag in Balochi and the dastaar in Brahvi.

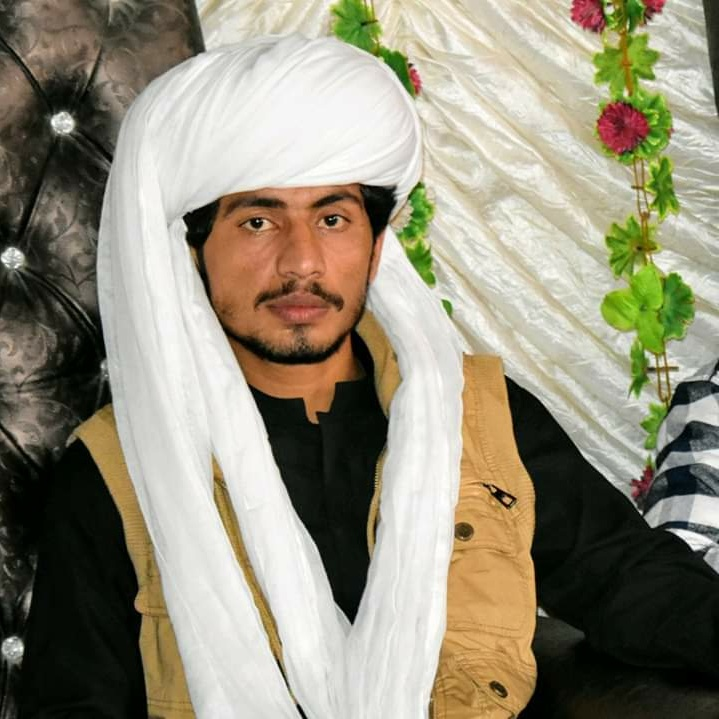
Baloch man with a paag

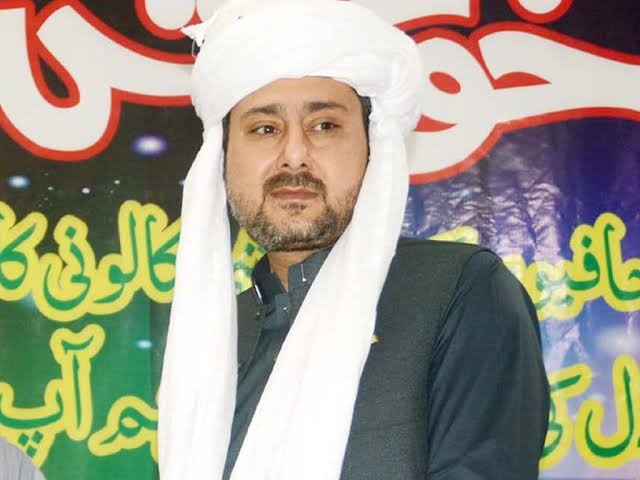
Baloch man wearing a paag

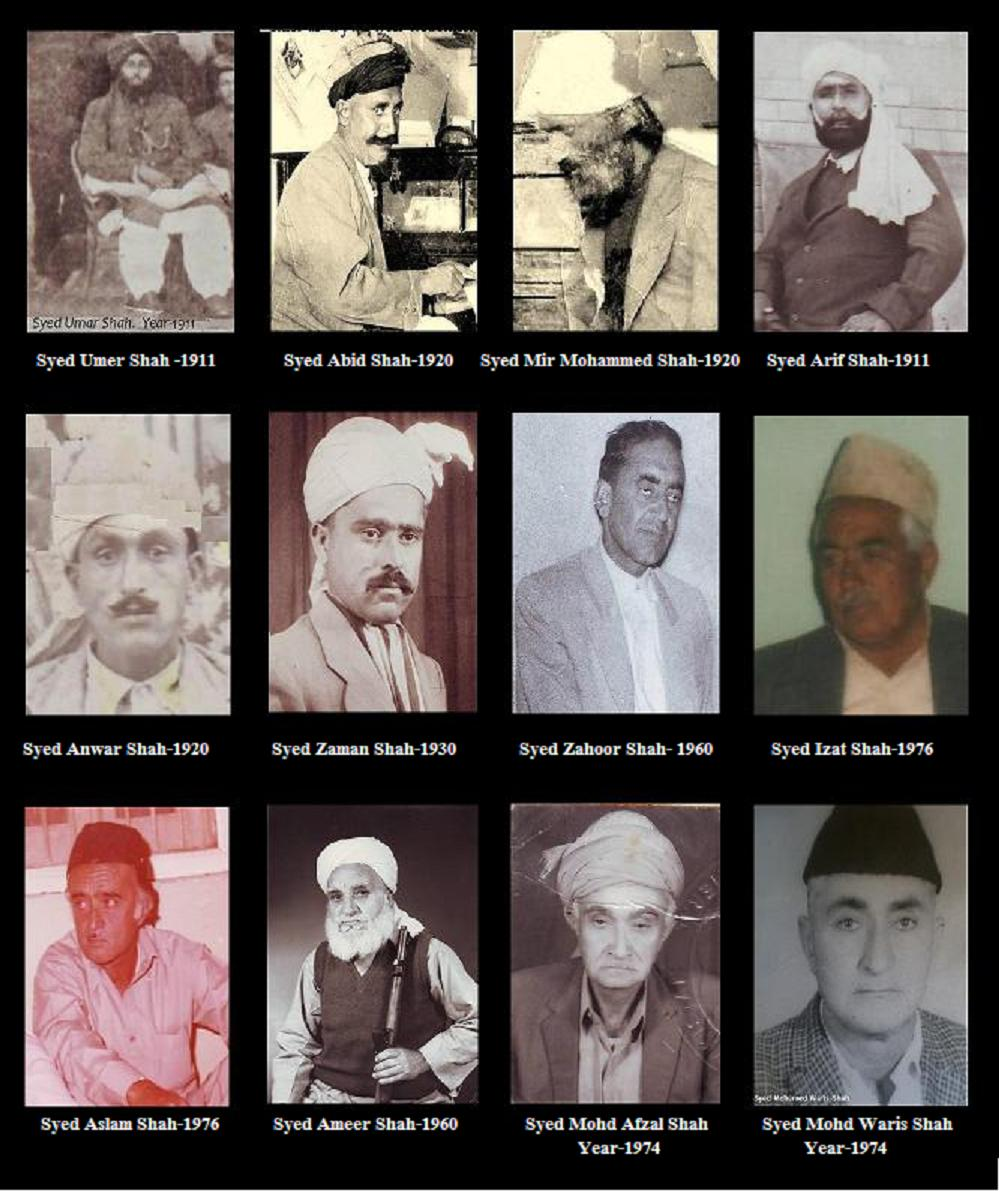
Elders of Kirani, Quetta, in turbans and hats

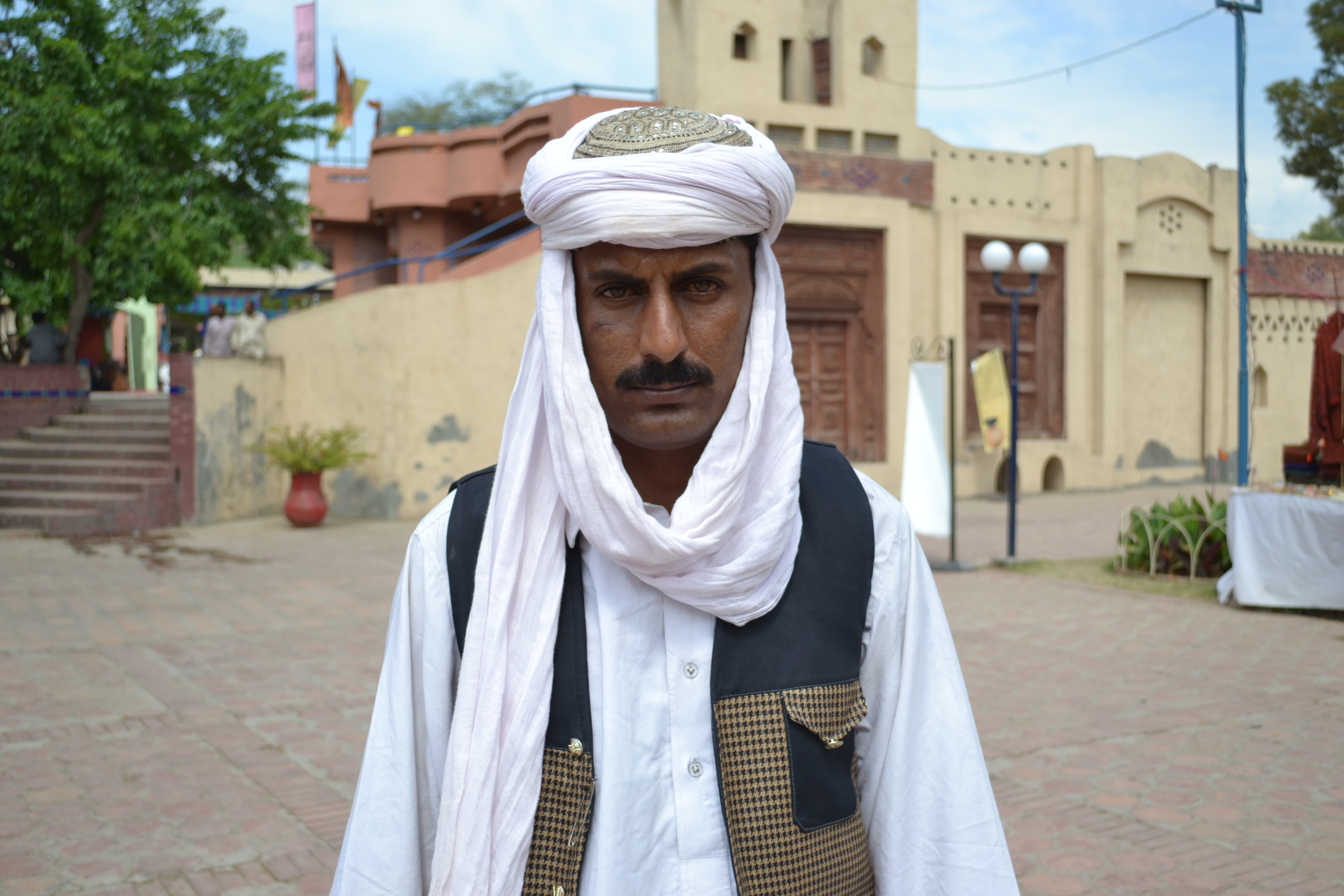
Baloch man outdoors with a paag

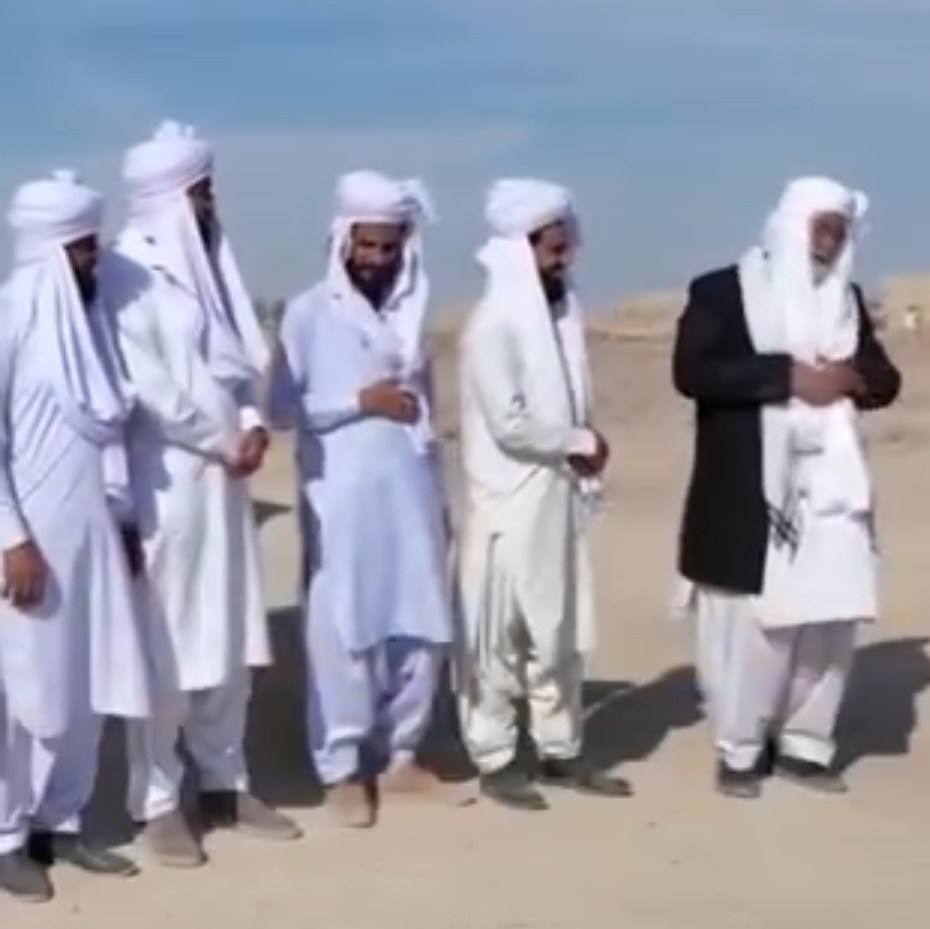
Group of Baloch man with paag

== Shoes and bags ==
Sawas are Balochi shoes that is woven with wild date from the leaves of a desert shrub. Traditional Baloch wear shoes referred to as chawats. the production of this footwear has created large local home-based industry.

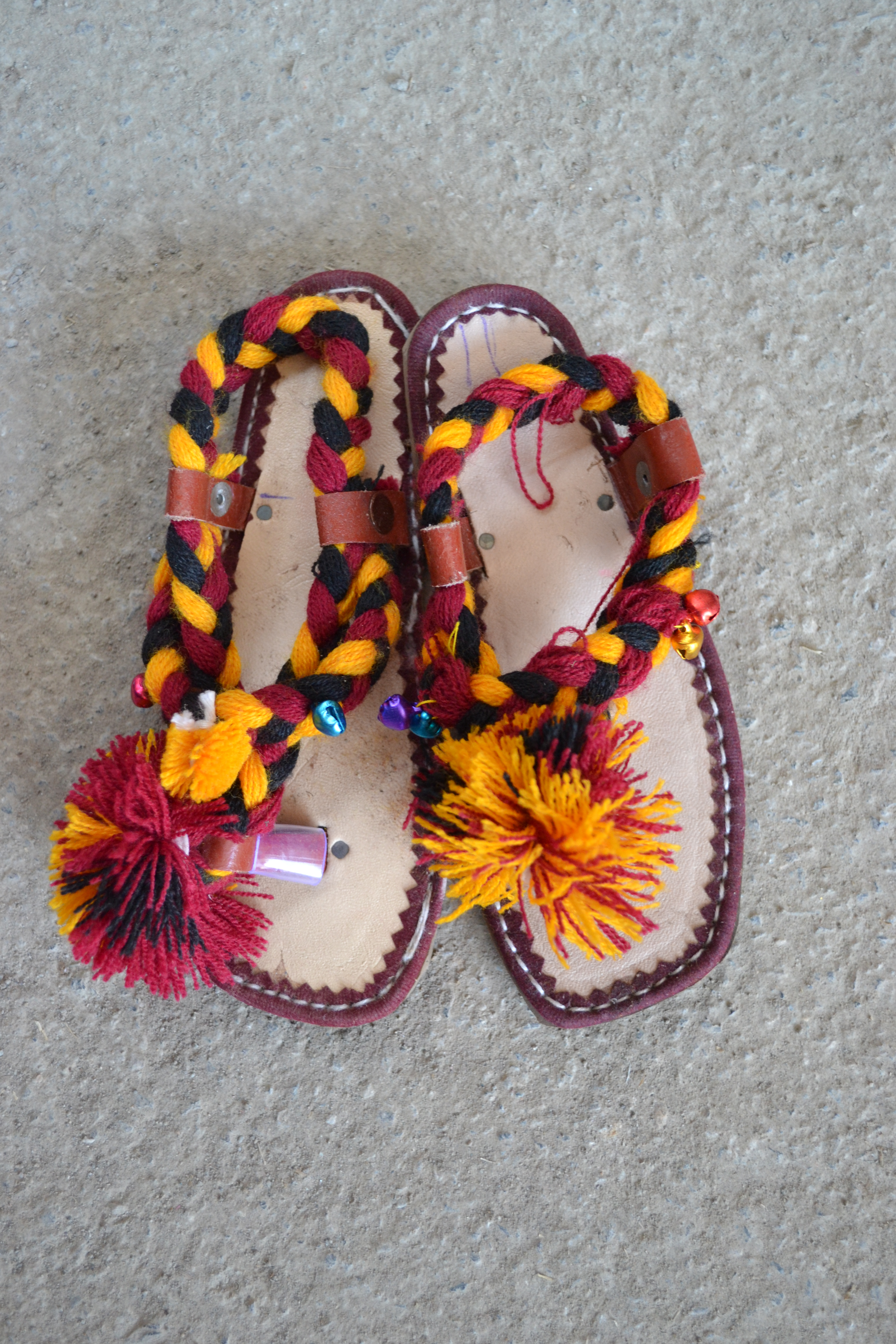
Balochi sawas shoes

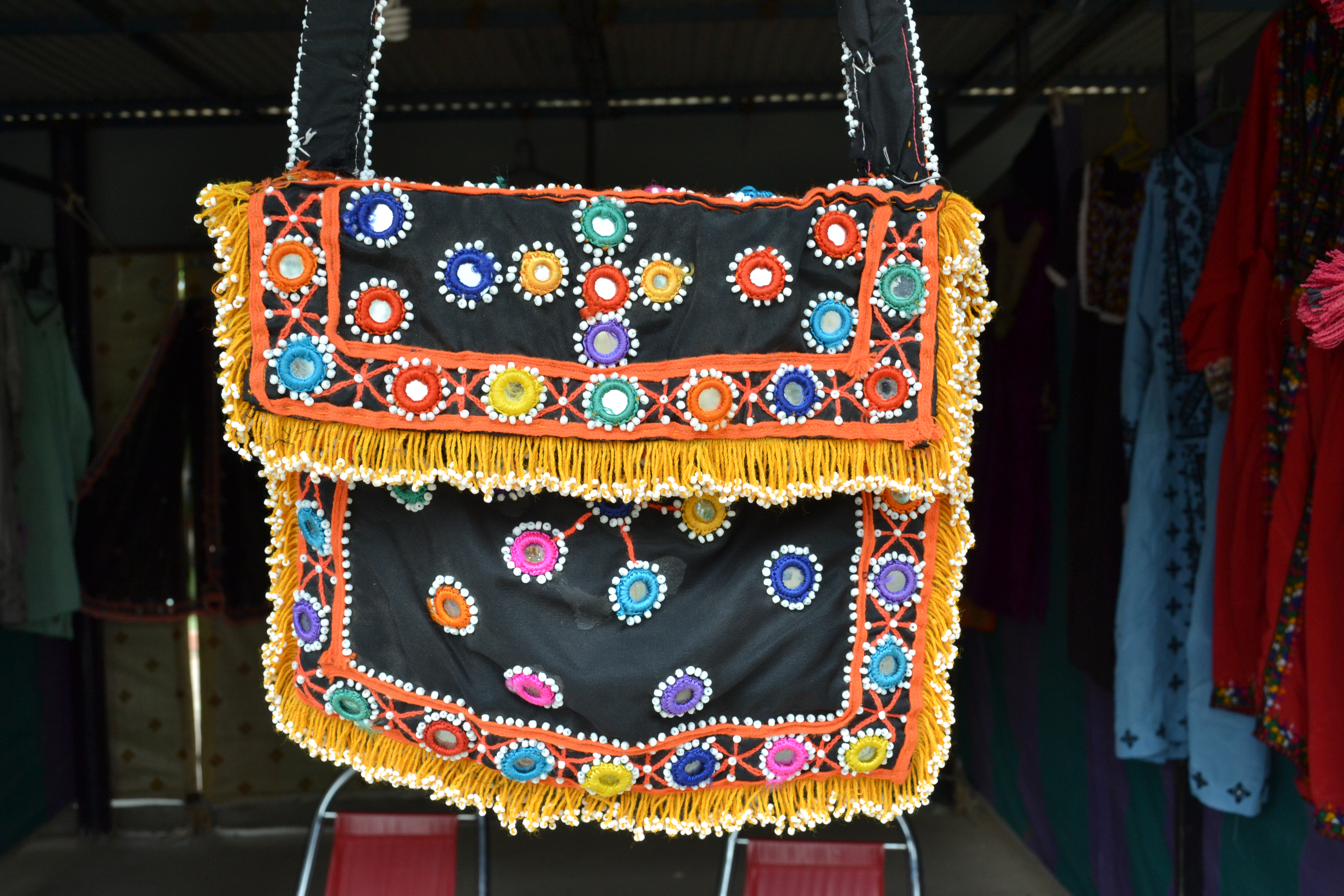
Balochi thela bag

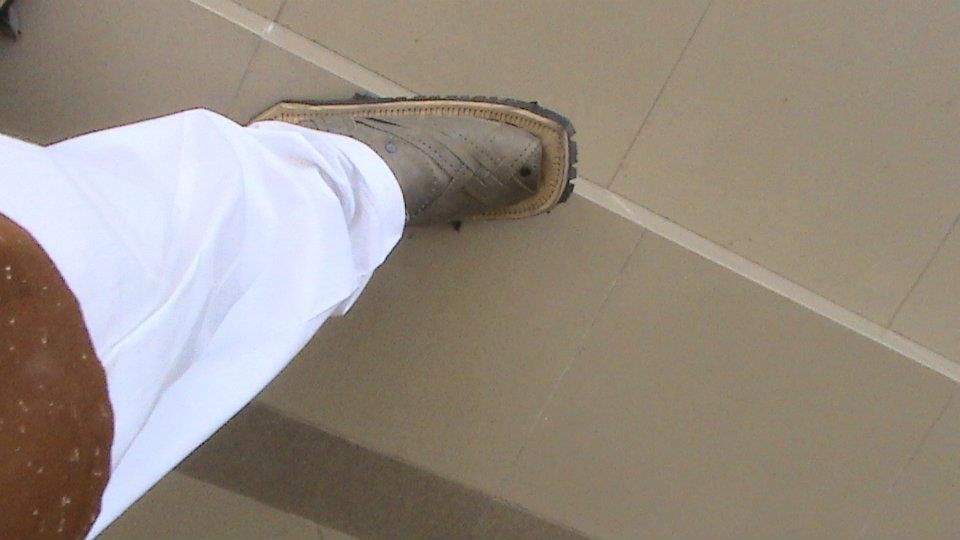
Balochi chawat, traditional footwear

== See also ==
- Clothing
  - Afghan clothing
  - Arab clothing
  - Persian clothing
  - Pakistani clothing
