= Kalatan District =

District in Sistan and Baluchestan province, Iran

Kalatan District Persian: بخش کلاتان
- District
- Location within Iran
- Coordinates: 27°10′33″N 60°08′44″E
- Country: Iran
- Province: Sistan and Baluchestan
- County: Bampur
- Capital: Qasemabad
- Time zone: UTC+3:30 (IRST)

Kalatan District (Persian: بخش کلاتان) is in Bampur County, Sistan and Baluchestan province, Iran. Its capital is the city of Qasemabad, whose population at the time of the 2016 National Census was 1,845 people in 467 households.

== History ==
In 2017, Bampur District was separated from Iranshahr County in the establishment of Bampur County, which was divided into two districts of two rural districts each, with the city of Bampur as its capital. In 2021, the village of Qasemabad was elevated to the status of a city.

== Demographics ==
=== Administrative divisions ===
Kalatan District
Administrative Divisions
Bampur-e Gharbi RD
Mirabad RD
Qasemabad (city) (Note: Became a city after the 2016 census)
RD = Rural District
