= Mohammadan, Bampur =

City in Sistan and Baluchestan province, Iran

Mohammadan Persian: محمدان
- City
- Location within Iran
- Coordinates: 27°12′06″N 60°33′49″E
- Country: Iran
- Province: Sistan and Baluchestan
- County: Bampur
- District: Central

Population (2016)
  - Total: 10,302
- Time zone: UTC+3:30 (IRST)

Mohammadan (Persian: محمدان) (Note: Formerly Mohammadabad (محمداباد), also romanized as Moḩammadābād; also known as Mohammad Abad Bampoor) is a city in the Central District of Bampur County, Sistan and Baluchestan province, Iran.

== Demographics ==
=== Population ===
At the time of the 2006 National Census, the population was 7,249 in 1,371 households, when it was the village of Mohammadabad in Bampur-e Sharqi Rural District of the former Bampur District of Iranshahr County. The following census in 2011 counted 8,193 people in 1,863 households, by which time the village had been elevated to city status as Mohammadan. The 2016 census measured the population of the city as 10,302 people in 2,550 households.

In 2017, the district was separated from the county in the establishment of Bampur County. Mohammadan and the rural district were transferred to the new Central District.
