= Mahtab Norouzi =

Iranian Baluchi needlework artist (1934–2012)

- مهتاب نوروزی
- Born: c. 1934; Qasemabad, Bampur, Sistan and Baluchestan province, Imperial State of Iran
- Died: 14 July 2012; Qasemabad, Bampur, Sistan and Baluchestan province, Iran
- Years active: c. 1949–c. 2008
- Known for: Baluchi needlework and embroidery

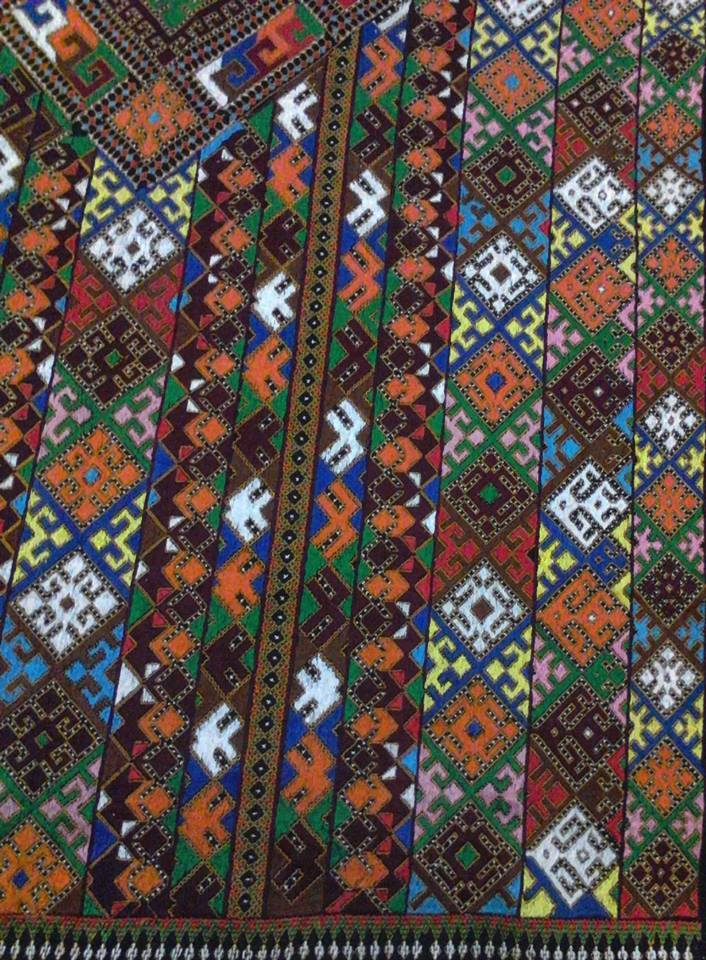
Example of Baluchi needlework

Mahtab Norouzi (Persian: مهتاب نوروزی; c. 1934 – 14 July 2012) was an Iranian Balochi master artisan in traditional Balochi needlework and embroidery.

== Biography ==
Mahtab Norouzi (English: New Year Moonlight) was born circa 1934 and lived in the small village of Qasemabad, Bampur in Sistan and Baluchestan province, Iran. She had learned to do the traditional Balochi embroidery from her mother, starting at age 15. She never married and lived alone, but she taught all the children in the village her crafting skills. She worked for nearly 50 years, creating various textiles.

The art of traditional Iranian needlework was largely forgotten until the early 1960s. Norouzi, amongst other artisans, was supported by Mehr Monir Jahanbani, who discovered the art of Balochi needlework and introduced it to the fashion world. In 2007, Norouzi was honored with the title of one of the "Forgotten Treasures of Iranian Art" by the Iranian Academy of the Arts, which had named only thirteen people with this title. Additionally, the Cultural Heritage Office of the Sistan and Baluchestan province gave her a pension payment for a few years for her work.

The last four years of her life she stopped embroidery because she struggled with back problems, low vision, and Alzheimer's disease; and she lived with her niece Zeinab Norouzi who is also a noted craftsperson. Norouzi died on 14 July 2012 in Qasemabad, Bampur.

Shahbanu Farah Diba Pahlavi had worn Balochi embroidered clothes, designed by Jahanbani and Keyvan Khosrovani in various ceremonies, and some of that work is thought to have been made by Norouzi. Her works are included in the Sa'dabad Museum in Tehran.

== See also ==
- Balochi clothing
