= Balochi needlework =

Type of handicraft made by the Baloch people

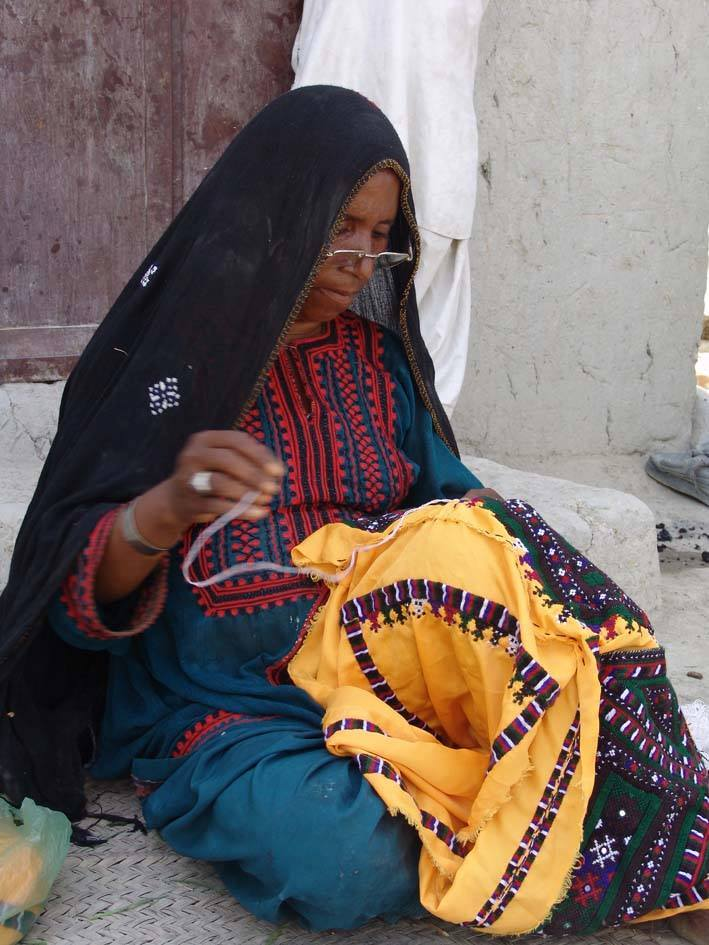
- Baloch woman creating needlework in Iran
- Type: Handicraft

Balochi needlework (Balochi: بلۏچی گد دۏچی, romanized: Balòči gòd dòči) is a type of Balochi handicraft made by the Baloch people. It is considered a heritage art, has been recognized by the United Nations Educational, Scientific and Cultural Organization (UNESCO), and sells internationally.

The Baloch people are native to the Balochistan region of South and West Asia, encompassing the countries of Pakistan, Iran, and Afghanistan.

== History ==
The Baloch people are from the Pakistani province of Balochistan; the Iranian province of Sistan-Baluchestan; and the southern areas of Afghanistan, including Nimruz, Helmand, and Kandahar provinces. The exact history of Balochi needlework is unknown. One theory is Balochi needlework originated from Mehrgarh (in modern-day Pakistan), a Neolithic site. Another theory is it was brought from the migration of the Slavs to Balochistan approximately 200 years before the spread of Islam, their traditional embroidery is called Rushnyk and contains many similarities. Another theory is the craft had developed alongside the silk production industry.

Different Baloch tribes have their own distinct needlework designs. This craft has traditionally been created only by women, and has been passed down through the generations. The stitching designs and patterning hold meaning; common motifs include arrows, "chicken feet", diamonds, and flowers. Some of the designs may also incorporate other materials such as small pieces of mirror (known as shisha), different colors of thread, and/or pieces of colored fabric. The needlework was traditionally used for decorating women's clothing, however it has also been used for decorating pillows, curtains, tablecloths, and men's clothing.

In 2015, the majority of the sales of Balochi needlepoint clothing occoured in Pakistan and Afghanistan.

== In fashion ==
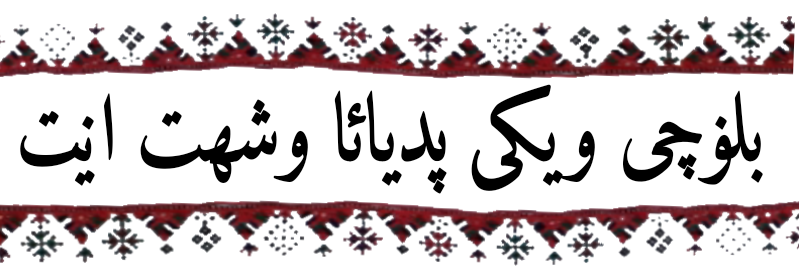
Proposed Balochi Wikipedia's logo, featuring Baloch needlework

In the 1960s, Iranian fashion designer Mehr "Nini" Monir Jahanbani began incorporating Balochi needlework patterns into her contemporary fashion designs.

Notable Baloch needlework artisans include Mahtab Norouzi. Farah Pahlavi, the former Shahbanu of Pahlavi Iran, was particularly drawn to Balochi needlework handcrafts and incorporated them into many of her formal dresses, which were designed by Iranian fashion designers Mehr Monir Jahanbani and Keyvan Khosrovani. It is believed that Mahtab Norouzi may have embroidered some of Pahlavi's dresses herself, working under a fashion designer.

== See also ==
- Balochi clothing
- Iranian handicrafts
- Sistani embroidery
- Kasidakari
