= Marandegan =

Marandegan مارندگان
- Village
- Location within Iran
- Coordinates: 27°33′50″N 61°03′09″E
- Country: Iran
- Province: Sistan and Baluchestan
- County: Khash
- Bakhsh: Irandegan
- Rural District: Kahnuk

Population (2006)
  - Total: 729
- Time zone: UTC+3:30 (IRST)
  - Summer (DST): UTC+4:30 (IRDT)

Marandegan (Persian: مارندگان, also Romanized as Mārandegān; also known as Mārdegān) is a village in Kahnuk Rural District, Irandegan District, Khash County, Sistan and Baluchestan Province, Iran. At the 2006 census, its population was 729, in 176 families.
