= Rakhshani (tribe) =

Pakistani and Iranian ethnic group

The Rakhshani (Balochi: رخشانی is a major Baloch tribe who live in Pakistan and Iran. They mostly live in Nushki District, Chagai District, Kharan District, Washuk District, which are located in the Rakhshan Division.

== History ==
Some sources say that the Rakhshani tribe came from the ancient city of Merv and migrated to Balochistan. Nearly 19,000 people migrated across Afghanistan to the region of Qalat. As time passed, the Rakhshani became one of the elite Baloch tribes in the region, with many Balochis renaming themselves Rakhshani. The Khanate of Kalat included many Rakhshani nobles, and the population was mostly Rukhshani.

== Language ==
The Rakhshani speak a dialect of the Balochi language called "Rakhshani". It is the second most spoken Balochi dialect after Makrani. The Rakhshani dialect is the most spoken Balochi dialect in Sistan and Baluchistan. Some Brahui are also of Rukhshani descent and speak the Rukhshani dialect of Brahui, which is different than the Balochi dialect. An important figure in Rukhshani literature is Aqil Khan Mengal, who wrote in both the Makrani and Rukhshani dialects of Balochi.
