= Bampur =

City in Sistan and Baluchestan province, Iran

Bampur Persian: بمپور
- City
- Location within Iran
- Coordinates: 27°11′42″N 60°27′17″E
- Country: Iran
- Province: Sistan and Baluchestan
- County: Bampur
- District: Central

Population (2016)
  - Total: 12,217
- Time zone: UTC+3:30 (IRST)

Bampur (Balochi: بُنپور and Persian: بمپور) (Note: Also romanized as Bampoor and Bampūr) is a city in the Central District of Bampur County, Sistan and Baluchestan province, Iran, serving as capital of both the county and the district.

== History ==
The old citadel of Bampur, on a hill about 100 feet (30 m) high 3 miles (4.8 km) north of the river, fell into ruins. A new fort called Kalah Nasseri, was built at Pahrah, which is known as Iranshahr, 15 miles (24 km) further east, in the 1880s.

Fahraj, now called Iranshahr, which in 1911 had a population of about 2,500, has become more important than Bampur. Fahraj, which is also known as Pahura (or Paharu or Puhra), is by some identified as the Poura where Alexander the Great halted on his march from the Indus Valley.

It was Historically ruled by Rakshani Baluchs of Iran Under Their Ruler, Shah Mihrab Khan, had led several campaigns against Persians laid waste into the lands, particularly Luristan

== Demographics ==
=== Language and ethnicity ===
The majority of the population are ethnic Baloch who speak the Balochi language.

=== Population ===
At the time of the 2006 National Census, the city's population was 9,073 in 1,664 households, when it was capital of the former Bampur District of Iranshahr County. The following census in 2011 counted 10,071 people in 2,426 households. The 2016 census measured the population of the city as 12,217 people in 3,123 households.

In 2017, the district was separated from the county in the establishment of Bampur County, and Bampur was transferred to the new Central District as the county's capital.

== Geography ==
It is located 330 miles (530 km) south-east of Kerman at an elevation of 1,720 feet (520 m) In 1911 its population was about 2,000 and it was the capital of the province. It is situated on the banks of the Bampur river which flows from east to west and empties itself about 70 miles (110 km) west into a hamun, or depression, 50 miles (80 km) in length, and called Jaz Murian.

== Archaeology ==
Bampur is an important site in relation to the ancient Helmand culture of western Afghanistan, and to the closely related Jiroft culture of eastern Iran.

The position of Bampur is near a river and major routes. Thus, prehistoric and later settlements were founded in the area. Sir Aurel Stein carried out reconnaissance here in 1932. In 1966, Beatrice de Cardi excavated next, and she established that there were six successive occupational phases (Periods I-VI) at the site.

There were links with major sites such as Shahr-i Sokhta in Iran, and Mundigak.

During the Period I of Shahr-e Sukhteh (3200–2800 BCE), there were already close connections between that city and the Bampur valley. These contacts also continued in the Period II of Shahr-e Sukhteh.

New ceramics appeared at the end of Period IV, suggesting contact with Iran, Makran, and Oman. Ceramics similar to Shahr-i Sokhta IV (ca. 2200-1800 b.c.) style were introduced in Periods V-VI.

There are also links with Umm an-Nar culture of Oman, dating possibly to the last quarter of the 3rd millennium.

Tepe Yahya in Kerman province, Iran, is another important site that may be related.
