= Central District (Bampur County) =

District in Sistan and Baluchestan province, Iran

Central District (Bampur County) Persian: بخش مرکزی شهرستان بمپور
- District
- Location within Iran
- Coordinates: 27°10′05″N 60°30′15″E
- Country: Iran
- Province: Sistan and Baluchestan
- County: Bampur
- Capital: Bampur
- Time zone: UTC+3:30 (IRST)

The Central District of Bampur County (Persian: بخش مرکزی شهرستان بمپور) is in Sistan and Baluchestan province, Iran. Its capital is the city of Bampur, whose population at the time of the 2016 National Census was 12,217 people in 3,123 households.

== History ==
In 2017, Bampur District was separated from Iranshahr County in the establishment of Bampur County, which was divided into two districts of two rural districts each, with Bampur as its capital.

== Demographics ==
=== Administrative divisions ===
Central District (Bampur County)
Administrative Divisions
Bampur-e Sharqi RD
Kheyrabad RD
Bampur (city)
Mohammadan (city)
RD = Rural District
