= Bampur-e Gharbi Rural District =

Rural district in Sistan and Baluchestan province, Iran

Bampur-e Gharbi Rural District Persian: دهستان بمپور غربي
- Rural District
- Location within Iran
- Coordinates: 27°08′49″N 60°07′26″E
- Country: Iran
- Province: Sistan and Baluchestan
- County: Bampur
- District: Kalatan
- Capital: Qasemabad

Population (2016)
  - Total: 16,794
- Time zone: UTC+3:30 (IRST)

Bampur-e Gharbi Rural District (Persian: دهستان بمپور غربي) is in Kalatan District of Bampur County, Sistan and Baluchestan province, Iran. It is administered from the city of Qasemabad.

== Demographics ==
=== Population ===
At the time of the 2006 National Census, the rural district's population (as a part of the former Bampur District of Iranshahr County) was 15,905 in 3,076 households. There were 16,647 inhabitants in 3,782 households at the following census of 2011. The 2016 census measured the population of the rural district as 16,794 in 4,225 households. The most populous of its 105 villages was Peshkabad, with 2,815 people.

In 2017, the district was separated from the county in the establishment of Bampur County, and the rural district was transferred to the new Kalatan District.
