= Bampur District =

Former district in Sistan and Baluchestan province, Iran

Bampur District Persian: بخش بمپور
- Former District
- Location within Iran
- Coordinates: 27°10′05″N 60°13′22″E
- Country: Iran
- Province: Sistan and Baluchestan
- County: Iranshahr
- Capital: Bampur

Population (2016)
  - Total: 60,557
- Time zone: UTC+3:30 (IRST)

Bampur District (Persian: بخش بمپور) is a former administrative division of Iranshahr County, Sistan and Baluchestan province, Iran. Its capital was the city of Bampur.

== History ==
After the 2006 National Census, the village of Mohammadabad was elevated to city status as Mohammadan. After the 2016 census, the district was separated from the county in the establishment of Bampur County.

== Demographics ==
=== Population ===
At the time of the 2006 census, the district's population was 47,360 in 9,148 households. The following census in 2011 counted 54,042 people in 12,590 households. The 2016 census measured the population of the district as 60,557 inhabitants in 15,369 households.

=== Administrative divisions ===
Bampur District Population
Administrative Divisions	2006	2011	2016
Bampur-e Gharbi RD	15,905	16,647	16,794
Bampur-e Sharqi RD	22,382	19,131	21,244
Bampur (city)	9,073	10,071	12,217
Mohammadan (city) (Note: Formerly the village of Mohammadabad)		8,193	10,302
Total	47,360	54,042	60,557
RD = Rural District
