= Bampur County =

County in Sistan and Baluchestan province, Iran

Bampur County Persian: شهرستان بمپور
- County
- Location of Bampur County in Sistan and Baluchestan province (center left, green)

- Location of Sistan and Baluchestan province in Iran
- Coordinates: 27°10′05″N 60°13′22″E
- Country: Iran
- Province: Sistan and Baluchestan
- Capital: Bampur
- Districts: Central, Kalatan
- Time zone: UTC+3:30 (IRST)

Bampur County (Persian: شهرستان بمپور) is in Sistan and Baluchestan province, Iran. Its capital is the city of Bampur, whose population at the time of the 2016 National Census was 12,217 people in 3,123 households.

== History ==
In 2017, Bampur District was separated from Iranshahr County in the establishment of Bampur County, which was divided into two districts of two rural districts each, with Bampur as its capital. In June 2021, the village of Qasemabad was elevated to the status of a city.

== Demographics ==
=== Administrative divisions ===
Bampur County's administrative structure is shown in the following table.

Bampur County
Administrative Divisions
Central District
Bampur-e Sharqi RD
Kheyrabad RD
Bampur (city)
Mohammadan (city)
Kalatan District
Bampur-e Gharbi RD
Mirabad RD
Qasemabad (city) (Note: Became a city after the 2016 census)
RD = Rural District

== See also ==
Media related to Bampur County at Wikimedia Commons
