= Omarabad =

Omarabad or Amrabad or Omarabad or Umrabad (Persian: عمراباد or امراباد) may refer to:

- Amrabad, Kazerun (امراباد), Fars Province
- Amrabad, Khamareh (عمراباد), Fars Province
- Omrabad, Hamadan (عمراباد)
- Amrabad Kurd, Hamadan Province
- Amrabad, Kerman (عمراباد)
- Amrabad, Kermanshah (عمراباد)
- Omarabad, Markazi (عمراباد)
- Omarabad, Sistan and Baluchestan (عمراباد)
- Omarabad, West Azerbaijan (عمراباد)
- Omarabad, Anzal (عمراباد), West Azerbaijan Province
