= Palangabad =

Palangabad (Persian: پلنگ اباد) may refer to several places in Iran:

- Palangabad District, an administrative division of Eshtehard County, Alborz province
- Palangabad Rural District, an administrative division of Eshtehard County, Alborz province
- Palangabad, Alborz, a city in Eshtehard County, Alborz province
- Palangabad, Ilam, a village in Darreh Shahr County, Ilam province
- Palangabad, Kerman, a village in Baft County, Kerman province
- Palangabad, Markazi, a village in Saveh County, Markazi province
- Palangabad-e Olya, a village in Tonekabon County, Mazandaran province

== See also ==
- Palangiabad (No. 1), a village in Zahedan County, Sistan and Baluchestan province
- Palangiabad (No. 2), a village in Zahedan County, Sistan and Baluchestan province
