= Amrabad (disambiguation) =

Amrabad (Persian: عمراباد) may refer to several places in Asia:

== India ==
- Amrabad, a mandal in Telangana State

== Iran ==
=== Fars province ===
- Amrabad, Kazerun, a village in Kazerun County
- Amrabad, Khamareh, a village in Khamareh County

=== Kerman province ===
- Amrabad, Kerman, a village in Shahr-e Babak County

=== Kermanshah province ===
- Amrabad, Kermanshah, a village in Ravansar County

=== Sistan and Baluchestan province ===
- Amrabad, Zahedan, a village in Zahedan County

=== Tehran province ===
- Qeshlaq-e Amrabad, a village in Varamin County
