= Hassanabad Koorin =

Hassanabad Koorin حسن‌آباد کورین
- Village
- Country: Iran
- Province: Sistan and Baluchestan
- County: Zahedan
- Bakhsh: Corrin
- Rural District: Corrin

Population (2006)
  - Total: 361
- Time zone: UTC+3:30 (IRST)
  - Summer (DST): UTC+4:30 (IRDT)

Hassanabad Koorin (Persian: حسن‌آباد کورین) is a village in Corrin Rural District, in the Corrin of Zahedan County, Sistan and Baluchestan Province, Iran. At the 2006 census, its population was 361, in 63 families.
