= Behesht Dar Kavir =

Behesht Dar Kavir بهشت در کویر
- Village
- Country: Iran
- Province: Sistan and Baluchestan
- County: Zahedan
- Bakhsh: Mirjaveh
- Rural District: Ladiz

Population (2006)
  - Total: 28
- Time zone: UTC+3:30 (IRST)
  - Summer (DST): UTC+4:30 (IRDT)

Behesht Dar Kavir (Persian: بهشت در کویر) is a village in Ladiz Rural District, in the Mirjaveh of Zahedan County, Sistan and Baluchestan Province, Iran. At the 2006 census, its population was 28, in 4 families.
