= Shuru =

Shuru or Showarow or Shooroo (Persian: شورو) may refer to:

- Shuru, Hormozgan
- Shuru, Kerman
- Shuru, Sistan and Baluchestan
- Showarow, South Khorasan
- Shuru Rural District, in Sistan and Baluchestan Province
