= Afzalabad =

Afzalabad (Persian: افضل اباد) may refer to:

- Afzalabad, Corrin, Sistan and Baluchestan Province
- Afzalabad, Iranshahr, Sistan and Baluchestan Province
- Afzalabad, Birjand, South Khorasan Province
- Afzalabad, Shusef, Nehbandan County, South Khorasan Province
- Nowghab-e Afzalabad, South Khorasan Province
