= Hormak =

Hormak (Persian: حرمك) may refer to:

- Hormak, Kerman
- Hormak, Sistan and Baluchestan
- Hormak Rural District, in Sistan and Baluchestan Province
