= Band-e Lal Mohammad =

Band-e Lal Mohammad بند لال محمد
- Village
- Country: Iran
- Province: Sistan and Baluchestan
- County: Zahedan
- Bakhsh: Central District
- Rural District: Nosratabad

Population (2006)
  - Total: 25
- Time zone: UTC+3:30 (IRST)
  - Summer (DST): UTC+4:30 (IRDT)

Band-e Lal Mohammad (Persian: بند لال محمد) is a village in Nosratabad Rural District, in the Central District of Zahedan County, Sistan and Baluchestan Province, Iran. At the 2006 census, its population was 25, in 5 families.
