= Talkhab, Zahedan =

Talkhab, Zahedan تلخاب
- Village
- Country: Iran
- Province: Sistan and Baluchestan
- County: Zahedan
- Bakhsh: Central District
- Rural District: Tamin

Population (2006)
  - Total: 68
- Time zone: UTC+3:30 (IRST)
  - Summer (DST): UTC+4:30 (IRDT)

The Iranian village of Talkhab, Zahedan (Persian: تلخاب) is located in the Tamin rural district of the Central District of Zahedan County, Sistan and Baluchestan Province. At the 2006 census, its population was 68, comprising 16 families.
