= Pas Kooshe =

Pas Kooshe پس کوشه
- Village
- Country: Iran
- Province: Sistan and Baluchestan
- County: Zahedan
- Bakhsh: Nosratabad
- Rural District: Tamin

Population (2006)
  - Total: 595
- Time zone: UTC+3:30 (IRST)
  - Summer (DST): UTC+4:30 (IRDT)

Pas Kooshe (Persian: پس کوشه) is a village in Tamin Rural District, in the Nosratabad of Zahedan County, Sistan and Baluchestan Province, Iran. At the 2006 census, its population was 595, in 133 families.
