= Baluch Ab =

Balochabad بلوچ آب
- Village
- Country: Iran
- Province: Sistan and Balochestan
- County: Zahedan
- Bakhsh: Corrin
- Rural District: Hormak

Population (2006)
  - Total: 50
- Time zone: UTC+3:30 (IRST)
  - Summer (DST): UTC+4:30 (IRDT)

Balochabad (Persian: بلوچ آب) is a village in Hormak Rural District, in the Corrin of Zahedan County, Sistan and Balochestan Province, Iran. At the 2006 census, its population was 50, in 7 families.
