= Hajiabad-e Minooyi =

Hajiabad-e Minooyi حاجی‌آباد مینویی
- Village
- Country: Iran
- Province: Sistan and Baluchestan
- County: Zahedan
- Bakhsh: Corrin
- Rural District: Corrin

Population (2006)
  - Total: 119
- Time zone: UTC+3:30 (IRST)
  - Summer (DST): UTC+4:30 (IRDT)

Hajiabad-e Minooyi (Persian: حاجی‌آباد مینویی) is a village in Corrin Rural District, in the Corrin of Zahedan County, Sistan and Baluchestan Province, Iran. At the 2006 census, its population was 119, in 30 families.
