= Allahabad Minooyi =

Allahabad Minooyi الله‌آباد مینوئی
- Village
- Country: Iran
- Province: Sistan and Baluchestan
- County: Zahedan
- Bakhsh: Central District
- Rural District: Corrin

Population (2006)
  - Total: 68
- Time zone: UTC+3:30 (IRST)
  - Summer (DST): UTC+4:30 (IRDT)

Allahabad Minooyi (Persian: الله‌آباد مینوئی) is a village in Corrin Rural District, in the Central District of Zahedan County, Sistan and Baluchestan Province, Iran. At the 2006 census, its population was 68, in 13 families.
