= Book Harmak (Bouk) =

Book Harmak (Bouk) بوک حرمک
- Village
- Country: Iran
- Province: Sistan and Baluchestan
- County: Zahedan
- Bakhsh: Central District
- Rural District: Hormak

Population (2006)
  - Total: 40
- Time zone: UTC+3:30 (IRST)
  - Summer (DST): UTC+4:30 (IRDT)

Book Harmak (Bouk) (Persian: بوک حرمک) is a village in Hormak Rural District, in the Central District of Zahedan County, Sistan and Baluchestan Province, Iran. At the 2006 census, its population was 40, in 8 families.
