= Abak Ziri Haj Shir Mohammad =

Abak Ziri Haj Shir Mohammad آبک زیری حاج شیر محمد
- Village
- Country: Iran
- Province: Sistan and Baluchestan
- County: Zahedan
- Bakhsh: Mirjaveh
- Rural District: Ladiz

Population (2006)
  - Total: 42
- Time zone: UTC+3:30 (IRST)
  - Summer (DST): UTC+4:30 (IRDT)

Abak Ziri Haj Shir Mohammad (Persian: آبک زیری حاج شیر محمد) is a village in the Ladiz Rural District, in the Mirjaveh District of Zahedan County, Sistan and Baluchestan Province, Iran. According to the 2006 census, its population was 42, comprising 6 families.
