= Cheshmeh Maleki =

Cheshmeh Maleki چشمه ملکی
- Village
- Country: Iran
- Province: Sistan and Baluchestan
- County: Zahedan
- Bakhsh: Corrin
- Rural District: Nosratabad

Population (2006)
  - Total: 42
- Time zone: UTC+3:30 (IRST)
  - Summer (DST): UTC+4:30 (IRDT)

Cheshmeh Maleki (Persian: چشمه ملکی) is a village in Nosratabad Rural District (Sistan and Baluchestan Province), in the Corrin of Zahedan County, Sistan and Baluchestan Province, Iran. At the 2006 census, its population was 42, in 8 families.
