= Eslamabad, Zahedan =

Eslamabad, Zahedan اسلام‌آباد
- Village
- Country: Iran
- Province: Sistan and Baluchestan
- County: Zahedan
- Bakhsh: Central District
- Rural District: Dumak

Population (2006)
  - Total: 142
- Time zone: UTC+3:30 (IRST)
  - Summer (DST): UTC+4:30 (IRDT)

Eslamabad, Zahedan (Persian: اسلام‌آباد) is a village in Dumak Rural District, in the Central District of Zahedan County, Sistan and Baluchestan Province, Iran. At the 2006 census, its population was 142, in 25 families.
