= Khoosab Anjarak =

Khoosab Anjarak خوشاب انجرک
- Village
- Interactive map of Khoosab Anjarak
- Country: Iran
- Province: Sistan and Baluchestan
- County: Zahedan
- Bakhsh: Central District
- Rural District: Tamin

Population (2006)
  - Total: 47
- Time zone: UTC+3:30 (IRST)
  - Summer (DST): UTC+4:30 (IRDT)

Khoosab Anjarak (Persian: خوشاب انجرک) is a village in Tamin Rural District, in the Central District of Zahedan County, Sistan and Baluchestan Province, Iran. At the 2006 census, its population was 47, in 11 families.
