= Hesagi =

Hesagi حسگی
- Village
- Country: Iran
- Province: Sistan and Baluchestan
- County: Zahedan
- Bakhsh: Central District
- Rural District: Nosratabad

Population (2006)
  - Total: 37
- Time zone: UTC+3:30 (IRST)
  - Summer (DST): UTC+4:30 (IRDT)

Hesagi (Persian: حسگی) is a village in Nosratabad Rural District (Sistan and Baluchestan Province), in the Central District of Zahedan County, Sistan and Baluchestan Province, Iran. At the 2006 census, its population was 37, in 8 families.
