= Jeyhoonak-e Bala =

Jeyhoonak-e Bala جیحونک بالا
- Village
- Country: Iran
- Province: Sistan and Baluchestan
- County: Zahedan
- Bakhsh: Central District
- Rural District: Tamin

Population (2006)
  - Total: 26
- Time zone: UTC+3:30 (IRST)
  - Summer (DST): UTC+4:30 (IRDT)

Jeyhoonak-e Bala (Persian: جیحونک بالا) is a village in Tamin Rural District, in the Central District of Zahedan County, Sistan and Baluchestan Province, Iran. At the 2006 census, its population was 26, in 5 families.
