= Pardalabad-e Hesarooie =

Pardalabad-e Hesarooie پردل‌آباد حصاروئیه
- Village
- Country: Iran
- Province: Sistan and Baluchestan
- County: Zahedan
- Bakhsh: Central District
- Rural District: Nosratabad

Population (2006)
  - Total: 74
- Time zone: UTC+3:30 (IRST)
  - Summer (DST): UTC+4:30 (IRDT)

Pardalabad-e Hesarooie (Persian: پردل‌آباد حصاروئیه) is a village in Nosratabad Rural District, in the Central District of Zahedan County, Sistan and Baluchestan Province, Iran. At the 2006 census, its population was 74, in 12 families.
