= Shahrak-e Hesaruiyeh =

Village in Sistan and Baluchestan province, Iran

Shahrak-e Hesaruiyeh Persian: شهرک حصاروییه
- Village
- Location within Iran
- Coordinates: 29°25′25″N 60°09′00″E
- Country: Iran
- Province: Sistan and Baluchestan
- County: Zahedan
- District: Nosratabad
- Rural District: Nosratabad

Population (2016)
  - Total: 120
- Time zone: UTC+3:30 (IRST)

Shahrak-e Hesaruiyeh (Persian: شهرک حصاروییه) is a village in, and the capital of, Nosratabad Rural District of Nosratabad District, Zahedan County, Sistan and Baluchestan province, Iran. The previous capital of the rural district was the village of Nosratabad, now a city.

== Demographics ==
=== Population ===
At the time of the 2011 National Census, the village's population was 21 in 4 households. The 2016 census measured the population of the village as 120 people in 57 households.
