= Anjareh =

Coordinates: 28°49′N 61°13′E

Anjareh انجره
- Village
- Interactive map of Anjareh
- Country: Iran
- Province: Sistan and Baluchestan
- County: Zahedan
- Bakhsh: Mirjaveh
- Rural District: ladiz

Population (2006)
  - Total: 283
- Time zone: UTC+3:30 (IRST)
  - Summer (DST): UTC+4:30 (IRDT)

Anjareh (Persian: انجره) is a village in Tamin Rural District, in the Mirjaveh of Zahedan County, Sistan and Baluchestan Province, Iran. At the 2006 census, its population was 283, in 57 families.
