= Jan Mohammadchahi =

Jan Mohammadchahi جان محمدچاهی
- Village
- Country: Iran
- Province: Sistan and Baluchestan
- County: Zahedan
- Bakhsh: Central District
- Rural District: Ladiz

Population (2006)
  - Total: 31
- Time zone: UTC+3:30 (IRST)
  - Summer (DST): UTC+4:30 (IRDT)

Jan Mohammadchahi (Persian: جان محمدچاهی) is a village in Ladiz Rural District, in the Central District of Zahedan County, Sistan and Baluchestan Province, Iran. At the 2006 census, its population was 31, in 7 families.
