= Hassanabad, Zahedan =

Hassanabad, Zahedan حسن‌آباد
- Village
- Interactive map of Hassanabad, Zahedan
- Country: Iran
- Province: Sistan and Baluchestan
- County: Zahedan
- Bakhsh: Central District
- Rural District: Ladiz

Population (2006)
  - Total: 355
- Time zone: UTC+3:30 (IRST)
  - Summer (DST): UTC+4:30 (IRDT)

Hassanabad, Zahedan (Persian: حسن‌آباد) is a village in Ladiz Rural District, in the Central District of Zahedan County, Sistan and Baluchestan Province, Iran. At the 2006 census, its population was 355, in 63 families.
