= Shahrak-e Mohammadabad, Sistan and Baluchestan =

Village in Sistan and Baluchestan province, Iran

Shahrak-e Mohammadabad Persian: شهرک محمدآباد
- Village
- Country: Iran
- Province: Sistan and Baluchestan
- County: Zahedan
- District: Kurin
- Rural District: Shuru

Population (2016)
  - Total: 1,159
- Time zone: UTC+3:30 (IRST)

Shahrak-e Mohammadabad (Persian: شهرک محمدآباد) is a village in the Shuru Rural District of Kurin District, Zahedan County, Sistan and Baluchestan province, Iran.

== Demographics ==
=== Population ===
At the time of the 2006 National Census, the village's population was 1,081 in 197 households. The following census in 2011 counted 1,193 people in 265 households. The 2016 census measured the population of the village as 1,159 people in 254 households. It was the most populous village in its rural district.
