= Anjarak-e Bala =

Anjarak-e Bala انجیرک بالا
- Village
- Country: Iran
- Province: Sistan and Baluchestan
- County: Zahedan
- Bakhsh: Corrin
- Rural District: Nosratabad

Population (2006)
  - Total: 27
- Time zone: UTC+3:30 (IRST)
  - Summer (DST): UTC+4:30 (IRDT)

Anjarak-e Bala (Persian: انجیرک بالا) is a village in Nosratabad Rural District, in the Corrin of Zahedan County, Sistan and Baluchestan Province, Iran. At the 2006 census, its population was 27, in 6 families.
