= Alnajan-e Do =

Coordinates: 28°56′N 61°16′E

Alnajan-e Do النجان دو
- Village
- Interactive map of Alnajan-e Do
- Country: Iran
- Province: Sistan and Baluchestan
- County: Zahedan
- Bakhsh: Mirjaveh
- Rural District: Ladiz

Population (2006)
  - Total: 167
- Time zone: UTC+3:30 (IRST)
  - Summer (DST): UTC+4:30 (IRDT)

Alnajan-e Do (Persian: النجان دو) is a village in Ladiz Rural District, in the Mirjaveh of Zahedan County, Sistan and Baluchestan Province, Iran. At the 2006 census, its population was 167, in 25 families.
