= Jamaabad-e Haji Noormohammad =

Jamaabad-e Haji Noormohammad جماآباد حاجی نورمحمد
- Village
- Country: Iran
- Province: Sistan and Baluchestan
- County: Zahedan
- Bakhsh: Mirjaveh
- Rural District: Cheshmeh Ziarat

Population (2006)
  - Total: 41
- Time zone: UTC+3:30 (IRST)
  - Summer (DST): UTC+4:30 (IRDT)

Jamaabad-e Haji Noormohammad (Persian: جماآباد حاجی نورمحمد) is a village in Cheshmeh Ziarat Rural District, in the Mirjaveh of Zahedan County, Sistan and Baluchestan Province, Iran. At the 2006 census, its population was 41, in 8 families.
