= Palizi Dargiaban =

Palizi Dargiaban پالیزی درگیابان
- Village
- Country: Iran
- Province: Sistan and Baluchestan
- County: Zahedan
- Bakhsh: Mirjaveh
- Rural District: Ladiz

Population (2006)
  - Total: 59
- Time zone: UTC+3:30 (IRST)
  - Summer (DST): UTC+4:30 (IRDT)

Palizi Dargiaban (Persian: پالیزی درگیابان) is a village in Ladiz Rural District, in the Mirjaveh of Zahedan County, Sistan and Baluchestan Province, Iran. At the 2006 census, its population was 59, in 12 families.
