= Galugah (disambiguation) =

Galugah is a city in Mazandaran Province, Iran.

Galugah or Galu Gah or Gelugah (Persian: گلوگاه) may also refer to various places in Iran:

- Galugah, Babol, a city in Babol County, Mazandaran Province
- Galugah County, an administrative subdivision of Manzandaran Province
- Galugah, Fars, a village in Fars Province
- Galugah, Kerman, a village in Kerman Province
- Galugah, Zahedan, a village in Sistan and Baluchestan Province
