= Abdoozak-e Paeen =

Abdoozak-e Paeen آب‌دوزک پایین
- Village
- Country: Iran
- Province: Sistan and Baluchestan
- County: Zahedan
- Bakhsh: Mirjaveh
- Rural District: Nosratabad

Population (2006)
  - Total: 147
- Time zone: UTC+3:30 (IRST)
  - Summer (DST): UTC+4:30 (IRDT)

Abdoozak-e Paeen (Persian: آب‌دوزک پایین) is a village in Nosratabad Rural District, in the Mirjaveh of Zahedan County, Sistan and Baluchestan Province, Iran. At the 2006 census, its population was 147, in 23 families.
