= Bon deh =

Bon deh بن ده
- Village
- Interactive map of Bon deh
- Coordinates: 28°41′51″N 61°10′05″E
- Country: Iran
- Province: Sistan and Baluchestan
- County: Zahedan
- Bakhsh: Mirjaveh
- Rural District: Tamin

Population (2006)
  - Total: 229
- Time zone: UTC+3:30 (IRST)
  - Summer (DST): UTC+4:30 (IRDT)

Bon deh (Persian: بن ده) is a village in Tamin Rural District, in the Mirjaveh of Zahedan County, Sistan and Baluchestan Province, Iran. At the 2006 census, its population was 229, in 45 families.
