= Padshahi Balasiah-e Loop =

Padshahi Balasiah-e Loop پدشاهی بالاسیاه لوپ
- Village
- Country: Iran
- Province: Sistan and Baluchestan
- County: Zahedan
- Bakhsh: Mirjaveh
- Rural District: Nosratabad

Population (2006)
  - Total: 36
- Time zone: UTC+3:30 (IRST)
  - Summer (DST): UTC+4:30 (IRDT)

Padshahi Balasiah-e Loop (Persian: پدشاهی بالاسیاه لوپ) is a village in Nosratabad Rural District, in the Mirjaveh of Zahedan County, Sistan and Baluchestan Province, Iran. At the 2006 census, its population was 36, in 10 families.
