= Chanali =

Chanali may refer to:

- Chanali, Zahedan, a village in Sistan and Baluchestan Province, Iran
- Chenali, a village in Hormozgan Province, Iran
- Chinali language, or Chanali, a language of North India
