= Hosseinabad-e Chahrahman =

Hosseinabad-e Chahrahman حسین‌آباد چاه رحمان
- Village
- Country: Iran
- Province: Sistan and Baluchestan
- County: Zahedan
- Bakhsh: Mirjaveh
- Rural District: Nosratabad

Population (2006)
  - Total: 220
- Time zone: UTC+3:30 (IRST)
  - Summer (DST): UTC+4:30 (IRDT)

Hosseinabad-e Chahrahman (Persian: حسین‌آباد چاه رحمان) is a village in Nosratabad Rural District (Sistan and Baluchestan Province), in the Mirjaveh of Zahedan County, Sistan and Baluchestan Province, Iran. At the 2006 census, its population was 220, in 38 families.
