= Eslamabad, Mirjaveh =

Eslamabad, Mirjaveh اسلام‌آباد
- Village
- Country: Iran
- Province: Sistan and Baluchestan
- County: Zahedan
- Bakhsh: Central District
- Rural District: Cheshmeh Ziarat

Population (2006)
  - Total: 28
- Time zone: UTC+3:30 (IRST)
  - Summer (DST): UTC+4:30 (IRDT)

Eslamabad, Mirjaveh (Persian: اسلام‌آباد) is a village in Cheshmeh Ziarat Rural District, in the Central District of Zahedan County, Sistan and Baluchestan Province, Iran. At the 2006 census, its population was 28, in 5 families.
