= Eslamabad Qanat Shahbaz =

Eslamabad Qanat Shahbaz اسلام‌آباد قنات شهباز
- Village
- Country: Iran
- Province: Sistan and Baluchestan
- County: Zahedan
- Bakhsh: Corrin
- Rural District: Ladiz

Population (2006)
  - Total: 61
- Time zone: UTC+3:30 (IRST)
  - Summer (DST): UTC+4:30 (IRDT)

Eslamabad Qanat Shahbaz (Persian: اسلام‌آباد قنات شهباز) is a village in Ladiz Rural District, in the Corrin of Zahedan County, Sistan and Baluchestan Province, Iran. Like many small villages in this province, Eslamabad Qanat Shahbaz likely has a population of fewer than 100 people and relies predominantly on subsistence farming and livestock husbandry for its economy. At the 2006 census, its population was 61, in 14 families. The village lies in a remote and arid region characterized by mountainous terrain and deep river valleys, typical of this portion of southeastern Iran Ladiz Rural District?. Infrastructure in such villages is typically limited, with scant public services and unpaved roads, reflecting the lower development characteristic of Iran's southeastern rural settlements.
