= Shahrak-e Garagheh =

Village in Sistan and Baluchestan province, Iran

Shahrak-e Garagheh Persian: شهرك گراغه
- Village
- Location within Iran
- Coordinates: 30°02′36″N 60°17′30″E
- Country: Iran
- Province: Sistan and Baluchestan
- County: Zahedan
- District: Nosratabad
- Rural District: Nosratabad

Population (2016)
  - Total: 751
- Time zone: UTC+3:30 (IRST)

Shahrak-e Garagheh (Persian: شهرك گراغه) is a village in Nosratabad Rural District of Nosratabad District, Zahedan County, Sistan and Baluchestan province, Iran.

== Demographics ==
=== Population ===
At the time of the 2006 National Census, the village's population was 248 in 44 households. The following census in 2011 counted 564 people in 107 households. The 2016 census measured the population of the village as 751 people in 198 households. It was the most populous village in its rural district.
