= Jolgeh Anjarak =

Jolgeh Anjarak جلگه انجرک
- Village
- Interactive map of Jolgeh Anjarak
- Country: Iran
- Province: Sistan and Baluchestan
- County: Zahedan
- Bakhsh: Mirjaveh
- Rural District: Tamin

Population (2006)
  - Total: 199
- Time zone: UTC+3:30 (IRST)
  - Summer (DST): UTC+4:30 (IRDT)

Jolgeh Anjarak (Persian: جلگه انجرک) is a village in Tamin Rural District, in the Mirjaveh of Zahedan County, Sistan and Baluchestan Province, Iran. At the 2006 census, its population was 199, in 31 families.
