= Tavakolabad, Ladiz =

Tavakolabad, Ladiz توکل‌آباد
- Village
- Country: Iran
- Province: Sistan and Baluchestan
- County: Zahedan
- Bakhsh: Corrin
- Rural District: Ladiz

Population (2006)
  - Total: 40
- Time zone: UTC+3:30 (IRST)
  - Summer (DST): UTC+4:30 (IRDT)

Tavakolabad, Ladiz (Persian: توکل‌آباد) is a village in Ladiz Rural District, in the Corrin of Zahedan County, Sistan and Baluchestan Province, Iran. At the 2006 census, its population was 40, in 7 families.
