= Bariz, Zahedan =

Bariz, Zahedan باریز
- Village
- Country: Iran
- Province: Sistan and Baluchestan
- County: Zahedan
- Bakhsh: Corrin
- Rural District: Tamin

Population (2006)
  - Total: 31
- Time zone: UTC+3:30 (IRST)
  - Summer (DST): UTC+4:30 (IRDT)

Bariz, Zahedan (Persian: باریز) is a village in Tamin Rural District, in the Corrin of Zahedan County, Sistan and Baluchestan Province, Iran. At the 2006 census, its population was 31, in 10 families.
