= Anjarak-e Paeen =

Coordinates: 28°39′N 60°59′E

Anjarak-e Paeen انجرک پایین
- Village
- Interactive map of Anjarak-e Paeen
- Country: Iran
- Province: Sistan and Baluchestan
- County: Zahedan
- Bakhsh: Mirjaveh
- Rural District: Tamin

Population (2006)
  - Total: 347
- Time zone: UTC+3:30 (IRST)
  - Summer (DST): UTC+4:30 (IRDT)

Anjarak-e Paeen (Persian: انجرک پایین) is a village in Tamin Rural District, in the Mirjaveh of Zahedan County, Sistan and Baluchestan Province, Iran. At the 2006 census, its population was 347, in 64 families.
