= Afzalabad, Corrin =

Afzalabad, Corrin افضل‌آباد
- Village
- Country: Iran
- Province: Sistan and Baluchestan
- County: Zahedan
- Bakhsh: Nosratabad
- Rural District: Corrin

Population (2006)
  - Total: 23
- Time zone: UTC+3:30 (IRST)
  - Summer (DST): UTC+4:30 (IRDT)

Afzalabad, Corrin (Persian: افضل‌آباد) is a village in Corrin Rural District, in the Nosratabad of Zahedan County, Sistan and Baluchestan Province, Iran. At the 2006 census, its population was 23, in 6 families.
