= Hajiabad-e Fajr =

Hajiabad-e Fajr حاجی‌آباد فجر
- Village
- Country: Iran
- Province: Sistan and Baluchestan
- County: Zahedan
- Bakhsh: Nosratabad
- Rural District: Cheshmeh Ziarat

Population (2006)
  - Total: 179
- Time zone: UTC+3:30 (IRST)
  - Summer (DST): UTC+4:30 (IRDT)

Hajiabad-e Fajr (Persian: حاجی‌آباد فجر) is a village in Cheshmeh Ziarat Rural District, in the Nosratabad of Zahedan County, Sistan and Baluchestan Province, Iran. At the 2006 census, its population was 179, in 36 families.
