= Tamin (disambiguation) =

Tamin may refer to:

- Tamin
- Tamin Rural District
- Famotidine
- Tamin (state constituency), represented in the Sarawak State Legislative Assembly
