= Tavakolabad Minooie =

Coordinates: 29°00′23″N 61°26′02″E

Tavakolabad Minooie توکل‌آباد مینوئی
- Village
- Interactive map of Tavakolabad Minooie
- Country: Iran
- Province: Sistan and Baluchestan
- County: Zahedan
- Bakhsh: Mirjaveh
- Rural District: Corrin

Population (2006)
  - Total: 104
- Time zone: UTC+3:30 (IRST)
  - Summer (DST): UTC+4:30 (IRDT)

Tavakolabad Minooie (Persian: توکل‌آباد مینوئی) is a village in Corrin Rural District, in the Mirjaveh of Zahedan County, Sistan and Baluchestan Province, Iran. At the 2006 census, its population was 104, in 23 families.
