= Khosh Ab, Zahedan =

Khosh Ab, Zahedan خوش‌آب
- Village
- Interactive map of Khosh Ab, Zahedan
- Coordinates: 28.8861°N 61.2582°E
- Country: Iran
- Province: Sistan and Baluchestan
- County: Zahedan
- Bakhsh: Mirjaveh
- Rural District: Ladiz

Population (2006)
  - Total: 186
- Time zone: UTC+3:30 (IRST)
  - Summer (DST): UTC+4:30 (IRDT)

Khosh Ab, Zahedan (Persian: خوش‌آب) is a village in Ladiz Rural District, in the Mirjaveh of Zahedan County, Sistan and Baluchestan Province, Iran. At the 2006 census, its population was 186, in 33 families.
