= Haji Baran =

Haji Baran حاجی باران
- Village
- Country: Iran
- Province: Sistan and Baluchestan
- County: Zahedan
- Bakhsh: Central District
- Rural District: Cheshmeh Ziarat

Population (2006)
  - Total: 188
- Time zone: UTC+3:30 (IRST)
  - Summer (DST): UTC+4:30 (IRDT)

Haji Baran (Persian: حاجی باران) is a village in Cheshmeh Ziarat Rural District, in the Central District of Zahedan County, Sistan and Baluchestan Province, Iran. According to the 2006 census, its population was 188, in 35 families.
