= Hajiabad-e Aval =

Hajiabad-e Aval حاجی‌آباد اول
- Village
- Country: Iran
- Province: Sistan and Baluchestan
- County: Zahedan
- Bakhsh: Mirjaveh
- Rural District: Cheshmeh Ziarat

Population (2006)
  - Total: 256
- Time zone: UTC+3:30 (IRST)
  - Summer (DST): UTC+4:30 (IRDT)

Hajiabad-e Aval (Persian: حاجی‌آباد اول) is a village in Cheshmeh Ziarat Rural District, in the Mirjaveh of Zahedan County, Sistan and Baluchestan Province, Iran. At the 2006 census, its population was 256, in 49 families.
