= Rahimabad, Zahedan =

Village in Sistan and Baluchestan province, Iran

Rahimabad Persian: رحیم‌آباد
- Village
- Country: Iran
- Province: Sistan and Baluchestan
- County: Zahedan
- District: Central
- Rural District: Hormak

Population (2016)
  - Total: 1,968
- Time zone: UTC+3:30 (IRST)

Rahimabad (Persian: رحیم‌آباد) is a village in Hormak Rural District of the Central District of Zahedan County, Sistan and Baluchestan province, Iran.

== Demographics ==
=== Population ===
At the time of the 2006 National Census, the village's population was 261 in 39 households. The following census in 2011 counted 932 people in 221 households. The 2016 census measured the population of the village as 1,968 people in 520 households. It was the most populous village in its rural district.
