= Pir Mohammad, Zahedan =

Pir Mohammad, Zahedan پیرمحمد
- Village
- Country: Iran
- Province: Sistan and Baluchestan
- County: Zahedan
- Bakhsh: Central District
- Rural District: Corrin

Population (2006)
  - Total: 79
- Time zone: UTC+3:30 (IRST)
  - Summer (DST): UTC+4:30 (IRDT)

Pir Mohammad, Zahedan (Persian: پیرمحمد) is a village in Corrin Rural District, in the Central District of Zahedan County, Sistan and Baluchestan Province, Iran. At the 2006 census, its population was 79, in 15 families.
