= Galugah, Zahedan =

Galugah گلوگاه
- Village
- Country: Iran
- Province: Sistan and Baluchestan
- County: Zahedan
- Bakhsh: Kurin
- Rural District: Shuru

Population (2006)
  - Total: 830
- Time zone: UTC+3:30 (IRST)
  - Summer (DST): UTC+4:30 (IRDT)

Galugah or Galougah (Persian: گلوگاه) is a village in Shuru, in the Kurin District of Zahedan County, Sistan and Baluchestan Province, Iran. At the 2006 census, its population was 830, in 197 families.
