= Bidlang, Zahedan =

Bidlang, Zahedan بیدلنگ
- Village
- Country: Iran
- Province: Sistan and Baluchestan
- County: Zahedan
- Bakhsh: Central District
- Rural District: Ladiz

Population (2006)
  - Total: 91
- Time zone: UTC+3:30 (IRST)
  - Summer (DST): UTC+4:30 (IRDT)

Bidlang, Zahedan (Persian: بیدلنگ) is a village in Ladiz Rural District, in the Central District of Zahedan County, Sistan and Baluchestan Province, Iran. At the 2006 census, its population was 91, in 19 families.
