= Book, Zahedan =

Book, Zahedan بوک
- Village
- Interactive map of Book, Zahedan
- Country: Iran
- Province: Sistan and Baluchestan
- County: Zahedan
- Bakhsh: Mirjaveh
- Rural District: Hormak

Population (2006)
  - Total: 209
- Time zone: UTC+3:30 (IRST)
  - Summer (DST): UTC+4:30 (IRDT)

Book, Zahedan (Persian: بوک) is a village in Hormak Rural District, in the Mirjaveh of Zahedan County, Sistan and Baluchestan Province, Iran. At the 2006 census, its population was 209, in 35 families.
