= Poorjangi, Zahedan =

Poorjangi, Zahedan پورجنگی
- Village
- Country: Iran
- Province: Sistan and Baluchestan
- County: Zahedan
- Bakhsh: Mirjaveh
- Rural District: Nosratabad

Population (2006)
  - Total: 46
- Time zone: UTC+3:30 (IRST)
  - Summer (DST): UTC+4:30 (IRDT)

Poorjangi, Zahedan (Persian: پورجنگی) is a village in Nosratabad Rural District (Sistan and Baluchestan Province), in the Mirjaveh of Zahedan County, Sistan and Baluchestan Province, Iran. At the 2006 census, its population was 46, in 9 families.
