= Tavakolabad, Mirjaveh =

Tavakolabad, Mirjaveh توکل‌آباد
- Village
- Country: Iran
- Province: Sistan and Baluchestan
- County: Zahedan
- Bakhsh: Mirjaveh
- Rural District: Corrin

Population (2006)
  - Total: 351
- Time zone: UTC+3:30 (IRST)
  - Summer (DST): UTC+4:30 (IRDT)

Tavakolabad, Mirjaveh (Persian: توکل‌آباد) is a village in Corrin Rural District, in the Mirjaveh of Zahedan County, Sistan and Baluchestan Province, Iran. At the 2006 census, its population was 351, in 65 families.
