= Pepbi Paeen (Hakimabad) =

Pepbi Paeen (Hakimabad) پپبی پایین
- Village
- Country: Iran
- Province: Sistan and Baluchestan
- County: Zahedan
- Bakhsh: Central District
- Rural District: Ladiz

Population (2006)
  - Total: 234
- Time zone: UTC+3:30 (IRST)
  - Summer (DST): UTC+4:30 (IRDT)

Pepbi Paeen (Hakimabad) (Persian: پپبی پایین) is a village in Ladiz Rural District, in the Central District of Zahedan County, Sistan and Baluchestan Province, Iran. At the 2006 census, its population was 234, in 45 families.
