= Apkachushan =

Coordinates: 28°56′N 61°22′E

Apkachushan آپکچوشان
- Village
- Interactive map of Apkachushan
- Country: Iran
- Province: Sistan and Baluchestan
- County: Zahedan
- Bakhsh: Nosratabad
- Rural District: Ladiz

Population (2006)
  - Total: 257
- Time zone: UTC+3:30 (IRST)
  - Summer (DST): UTC+4:30 (IRDT)

Apkachushan (Persian: آپکچوشان) is a village in Ladiz Rural District, in the Nosratabad of Zahedan County, Sistan and Baluchestan Province, Iran. At the 2006 census, its population was 257, in 41 families.
