= Boorger =

Boorger بورگر
- Village
- Country: Iran
- Province: Sistan and Baluchestan
- County: Zahedan
- Bakhsh: Central District
- Rural District: Cheshmeh Ziarat

Population (2006)
  - Total: 115
- Time zone: UTC+3:30 (IRST)
  - Summer (DST): UTC+4:30 (IRDT)

Boorger (Persian: بورگر) is a village in Cheshmeh Ziarat Rural District, in the Central District of Zahedan County, Sistan and Baluchestan Province, Iran. At the 2006 census, its population was 115, in 23 families.
