= Tavakolabad Hoorshi =

Tavakolabad Hoorshi توکل‌آباد هورشی
- Village
- Country: Iran
- Province: Sistan and Baluchestan
- County: Zahedan
- Bakhsh: Mirjaveh
- Rural District: Cheshmeh Ziarat

Population (2006)
  - Total: 42
- Time zone: UTC+3:30 (IRST)
  - Summer (DST): UTC+4:30 (IRDT)

Tavakolabad Hoorshi (Persian: توکل‌آباد هورشی) is a village in Cheshmeh Ziarat Rural District, in the Mirjaveh of Zahedan County, Sistan and Baluchestan Province, Iran. At the 2006 census, its population was 42, in 7 families.
