= Esmaeelabad, Zahedan =

Esmaeelabad, Zahedan اسماعیل‌آباد
- Village
- Country: Iran
- Province: Sistan and Baluchestan
- County: Zahedan
- Bakhsh: Central District
- Rural District: Cheshmeh Ziarat

Population (2006)
  - Total: 102
- Time zone: UTC+3:30 (IRST)
  - Summer (DST): UTC+4:30 (IRDT)

Esmaeelabad, Zahedan (Persian: اسماعیل‌آباد) is a village in Cheshmeh Ziarat Rural District, in the Central District of Zahedan County, Sistan and Baluchestan Province, Iran. At the 2006 census, its population was 102, in 23 families.
