= Allahabad Roqani =

Allahabad Roqani الله‌آباد روغنی
- Village
- Country: Iran
- Province: Sistan and Baluchestan
- County: Zahedan
- Bakhsh: Corrin
- Rural District: Cheshmeh Ziarat

Population (2006)
  - Total: 7
- Time zone: UTC+3:30 (IRST)
  - Summer (DST): UTC+4:30 (IRDT)

Allahabad Roqani (Persian: الله‌آباد روغنی) is a village in Cheshmeh Ziarat Rural District, in the Corrin of Zahedan County, Sistan and Baluchestan Province, Iran. At the 2006 census, its population was 7, in 4 families.
