= Jangooneh =

Jangooneh جنگونه
- Village
- Country: Iran
- Province: Sistan and Baluchestan
- County: Zahedan
- Bakhsh: Mirjaveh
- Rural District: Nosratabad

Population (2006)
  - Total: 29
- Time zone: UTC+3:30 (IRST)
  - Summer (DST): UTC+4:30 (IRDT)

Jangooneh (Persian: جنگونه) is a village in Nosratabad Rural District (Zahedan County), in the Mirjaveh of Zahedan County, Sistan and Baluchestan province, Iran. At the 2006 census, its population was 29, in only 6 families.
