= Cheshmeh Khan Mohammad =

Village in Sistan and Baluchestan province, Iran

Cheshmeh Khan Mohammad Persian: چشمه خان‌محمد
- Village
- Country: Iran
- Province: Sistan and Baluchestan
- County: Zahedan
- District: Central
- Rural District: Cheshmeh Ziarat

Population (2016)
  - Total: 133
- Time zone: UTC+3:30 (IRST)

Cheshmeh Khan Mohammad (Persian: چشمه خان‌محمد) is a village in, and the capital of, Cheshmeh Ziarat Rural District of the Central District of Zahedan County, Sistan and Baluchestan province, Iran.

== Demographics ==
=== Population ===
At the time of the 2006 National Census, the village's population was 87 in 21 households. At the time of the following census in 2011, the village's population was below the reporting threshold. The 2016 census measured the population of the village as 133 people in 28 households.
