= Anooshiravan, Zahedan =

Anooshiravan, Zahedan انوشیروان
- Village
- Country: Iran
- Province: Sistan and Baluchestan
- County: Zahedan
- Bakhsh: Corrin
- Rural District: Nosratabad

Population (2006)
  - Total: 34
- Time zone: UTC+3:30 (IRST)
  - Summer (DST): UTC+4:30 (IRDT)

Anooshiravan, Zahedan (Persian: انوشیروان) is a village in Nosratabad Rural District, in the Corrin of Zahedan County, Sistan and Baluchestan Province, Iran. At the 2006 census, its population was 34, in 6 families.
