= Palgi =

Palgi or Polagi (Persian: پلگي) may refer to:

- Palgi, Hirmand
- Palgi, Zahedan
- Yoel Palgi
