= Chah-e Zard, Sistan and Baluchestan =

Village in Sistan and Baluchestan province, Iran

Chah-e Zard Persian: چاه زرد
- Village
- Location within Iran
- Coordinates: 29°11′55″N 60°27′36″E
- Country: Iran
- Province: Sistan and Baluchestan
- County: Zahedan
- District: Nosratabad
- Rural District: Dumak

Population (2016)
  - Total: 675
- Time zone: UTC+3:30 (IRST)

Chah-e Zard (Persian: چاه زرد) is a village in Dumak Rural District of Nosratabad District, Zahedan County, Sistan and Baluchestan province, Iran.

== Demographics ==
=== Population ===
At the time of the 2006 National Census, the village's population was 269 in 48 households. The following census in 2011 counted 311 people in 63 households. The 2016 census measured the population of the village as 675 people in 162 households. It was the most populous village in its rural district.
