= Mohammadabad-e Suran =

Village in Sistan and Baluchestan province, Iran

Mohammadabad-e Suran Persian: محمدآباد سوران
- Village
- Location within Iran
- Coordinates: 28°54′20″N 61°18′57″E
- Country: Iran
- Province: Sistan and Baluchestan
- County: Mirjaveh
- District: Ladiz
- Rural District: Ladiz

Population (2016)
  - Total: 708
- Time zone: UTC+3:30 (IRST)

Mohammadabad-e Suran (Persian: محمدآباد سوران) is a village in Ladiz Rural District of Ladiz District, Mirjaveh County, Sistan and Baluchestan province, Iran.

== Demographics ==
=== Population ===
At the time of the 2006 National Census, the village's population was 757 in 125 households, when it was in the former Mirjaveh District of Zahedan County. The following census in 2011 counted 831 people in 183 households. The 2016 census measured the population of the village as 708 people in 178 households, by which time the district had been separated from the county in the establishment of Mirjaveh County. The rural district was transferred to the new Ladiz District. It was the most populous village in its rural district.
