= Shuru, Sistan and Baluchestan =

Village in Sistan and Baluchestan province, Iran

Shuru Persian: شورو
- Village
- Location within Iran
- Coordinates: 29°09′04″N 60°14′51″E
- Country: Iran
- Province: Sistan and Baluchestan
- County: Zahedan
- District: Kurin
- Rural District: Shuru

Population (2016)
  - Total: 260
- Time zone: UTC+3:30 (IRST)

Shuru (Persian: شورو) is a village in, and the capital of, Shuru Rural District of Kurin District, Zahedan County, Sistan and Baluchestan province, Iran.

== Demographics ==
=== Population ===
At the time of the 2006 National Census, the village's population was 319 in 54 households. The following census in 2011 counted 240 people in 51 households. The 2016 census measured the population of the village as 260 people in 79 households.
