= Bandabi =

Bandabi may refer to:

- Bandabi (Bandak Siah), a village in Tamin Rural District, Iran
- Bandabi, the mascot of the 2018 Paralympic Games; see Soohorang and Bandabi
