= Jeyhoonak-e Paeen =

Jeyhoonak-e Paeen جیحونک پایین
- Village
- Country: Iran
- Province: Sistan and Baluchestan
- County: Mirjaveh
- Bakhsh: Mirjaveh
- Rural District: Tamin

Population (2006)
  - Total: 47
- Time zone: UTC+3:30 (IRST)
  - Summer (DST): UTC+4:30 (IRDT)

Jeyhoonak-e Paeen (Persian: جیحونک پایین) is a village in the Tamin Rural District of Mirjaveh County, which is in Sistan and Baluchestan Province, Iran.

In the 2006 census, its population was 47, in 9 families.
