= Chah-e Zard =

Chah-e Zard may refer tom the following places in Iran:

- Chah-e Zard, Sistan and Baluchestan
- Chah-e Zard, South Khorasan
