= Hormak, Sistan and Baluchestan =

Village in Sistan and Baluchestan province, Iran

Hormak Persian: حرمک
- Village
- Location within Iran
- Coordinates: 29°59′01″N 60°50′32″E
- Country: Iran
- Province: Sistan and Baluchestan
- County: Zahedan
- District: Central
- Rural District: Hormak

Population (2016)
  - Total: 367
- Time zone: UTC+3:30 (IRST)

Hormak (Persian: حرمک) is a village in, and the capital of, Hormak Rural District of the Central District of Zahedan County, Sistan and Baluchestan province, Iran.

== Demographics ==
=== Population ===
At the time of the 2006 National Census, the village's population was 394 in 76 households. The following census in 2011 counted 346 people in 74 households. The 2016 census measured the population of the village as 367 people in 78 households.
