= Sar Jangal, Zahedan =

City in Sistan and Baluchestan province, Iran

Sar Jangal Persian: سرجنگل
- City
- Location within Iran
- Coordinates: 28°52′59″N 60°24′18″E
- Country: Iran
- Province: Sistan and Baluchestan
- County: Zahedan
- District: Kurin

Population (2016)
  - Total: 1,790
- Time zone: UTC+3:30 (IRST)

Sar Jangal (Persian: سرجنگل) is a city in, and the capital of Kurin District of Zahedan County, Sistan and Baluchestan province, Iran. It also serves as the administrative center for Kurin Rural District.

== Demographics ==
=== Population ===
At the time of the 2006 National Census, the city's population was 261 in 45 households, when it was a village in Kurin Rural District. The following census in 2011 counted 490 people in 114 households. The 2016 census measured the population of the city as 1,790 people in 501 households. It was the most populous village in its rural district.

After the census, Sar Jangal was elevated to the status of a city.
