= Nosratabad =

City in Sistan and Baluchestan province, Iran

Nosratabad Persian: نصرت آباد
- City
- Location within Iran
- Coordinates: 29°51′29″N 59°58′45″E
- Country: Iran
- Province: Sistan and Baluchestan
- County: Zahedan
- District: Nosratabad

Population (2016)
  - Total: 5,238
- Time zone: UTC+3:30 (IRST)

Nosratabad (Persian: نصرت آباد) (Note: Also romanized as Noșratābād) is a city in, and the capital of, Nosratabad District of Zahedan County, Sistan and Baluchestan province, Iran. As a village, it was the capital of Nosratabad Rural District until its capital was transferred to the village of Shahrak-e Hesaruiyeh. Nosratabad lies on the road from Zahedan to Bam.

== History ==
Nosratabad (The City of Nosrat) was named after Nusret el Mulk, a former deputy governor of Sistan; when built, c. 1870, it was first called Nasirabad in honor of Nasr-uddin Shah; other names, used locally, are Shahr-i-Seistan, Shahr-i-Nassiriyeh, or simply Shahr (the town). Its climate is very dry and hot; due to its location in the Lut Desert, it is among the hottest locations in the world. In August 1926, the highest officially recorded temperature soared to 58.0 °C.

During the late nineteenth century it was the residence of British and Russian consuls, and had post and telegraph offices (as of 1911). The city served as the capital of Sistan until some time in the 20th century.

The city was the site of a major explosion in 2004, when a fuel tanker lost control at a police checkpoint and collided with a bus, resulting in 90 fatalities and 114 additional injuries.

On 3 June 2009, the Jondollah militant group blocked off roads between Nosratabad and Bam, seizing several trucks.

== Demographics ==
=== Population ===
At the time of the 2006 National Census, the city's population was 4,182 in 919 households. The following census in 2011 counted 4,270 people in 931 households. The 2016 census measured the population of the city as 5,238 people in 1,255 households.
