= 2004 Nosratabad fuel tanker explosion =

Accident in Sistan and Baluchestan, Iran

- Location within Iran

Details
- Date: 24 June 2004
- Location: Nosratabad, Sistan and Baluchestan, Iran
- Coordinates: 29°51′29″N 59°58′45″E
- Cause: Collision of a petrol tanker and bus

Statistics
- Deaths: 90
- Injured: 114

The 2004 Nosratabad fuel tanker explosion was a catastrophic incident that took place on 24 June 2004, near Iran's border with Afghanistan, resulting in at least 90 fatalities and 114 injuries. The disaster occurred when a petrol truck lost control and collided with a bus at the Nosratabad police checkpoint, located about 110 kilometres (68 mi) west of Zahedan.

== Background ==
Iran has a high rate of road accidents, with an average of 22,000 annual fatalities at the time of the disaster.

Police checkpoints, mostly present to check for drugs, are commonplace on roads in the vicinity of Zahedan, the capital of Sistan and Baluchestan province. The checkpoint at Nosratabad was situated on a sharp bend and was known for creating long queues of buses and cars, and its location and outdated inspection methods would later be criticised by Zahedan parliamentarian Hossein Ali Shahriari.

Earlier in the year on 18 February 2004, a train carrying sulphur, fertiliser, petrol, and cotton wool derailed, separated, and exploded near Nishapur, killing almost 300 people.

== Incident ==
The petrol truck was carrying more than 17,000 litres (3,700 imp gal; 4,500 US gal) of petrol when it lost control and collided with an electricity pylon and then a bus at the police post, where other vehicles were waiting in line. The impact caused the truck to explode, creating a fireball that engulfed five other buses and several additional vehicles that were stopped at the checkpoint, some of which were carrying tar, further exacerbating the flames. The explosion was so intense that many of the victims were charred beyond recognition.

According to the state-run Islamic Republic News Agency, most of the victims were women and children who were waiting inside the buses while the men were being searched by the police outside. The victims were burnt to death due to a lack of firefighting equipment at the police station in Nosratabad.

Mehran Nourbakhsh, a spokesperson for the Iranian Red Crescent Society, stated that 90 people had died in the blast and 114 had been injured. He added that the organization had dispatched 40 workers to the scene to provide aid.

== See also ==
- List of accidents and disasters by death toll
