= Tamin =

Village in Sistan and Baluchestan province, Iran

Tamin Persian: تمين
- Village
- Location within Iran
- Coordinates: 28°41′37″N 61°09′56″E
- Country: Iran
- Province: Sistan and Baluchestan
- County: Mirjaveh
- District: Ladiz
- Rural District: Tamin

Population (2016)
  - Total: 762
- Time zone: UTC+3:30 (IRST)

Tamin (Persian: تمين) (Note: Also romanized as Tamīn and Temīn; also known as Tamīn-e Pā’īn) is a village in, and the capital of, Tamin Rural District of Ladiz District, Mirjaveh County, Sistan and Baluchestan province, Iran.

== Demographics ==
=== Population ===
At the time of the 2006 National Census, the village's population was 457 in 81 households, when it was in the former Mirjaveh District of Zahedan County. The following census in 2011 counted 1,023 people in 301 households. The 2016 census measured the population of the village as 762 people in 226 households, by which time the district had been separated from the county in the establishment of Mirjaveh County. The rural district was transferred to the new Ladiz District. It was the most populous village in its rural district.
