= Cheshmeh Ziarat Rural District =

Rural district in Sistan and Baluchestan province, Iran

Cheshmeh Ziarat Rural District Persian: دهستان چشمه زیارت
- Rural District
- Location within Iran
- Coordinates: 29°24′23″N 60°48′25″E
- Country: Iran
- Province: Sistan and Baluchestan
- County: Zahedan
- District: Central
- Capital: Cheshmeh Khan Mohammad

Population (2016)
  - Total: 34,693
- Time zone: UTC+3:30 (IRST)

Cheshmeh Ziarat Rural District (Persian: دهستان چشمه زیارت) is in the Central District of Zahedan County, Sistan and Baluchestan province, Iran. Its capital is the village of Cheshmeh Khan Mohammad.

== Demographics ==
=== Population ===
At the time of the 2006 National Census, the rural district's population was 21,950 in 4,445 households. There were 22,161 inhabitants in 5,172 households at the following census of 2011. The 2016 census measured the population of the rural district as 34,693 in 8,821 households. The most populous of its 773 villages was Mojtame-ye Gavdari, with 4,087 people.

== Villages ==
- Afzalabad
- Ahmadabad
- Ahmadabad-e Doorban
- Al Gari
- Allahabad Roqani
- Allahdadabad, Zahedan
- Bazrakabad, Zahedan
- Behjatabad
- Bepi
- Bidi
- Boorger
- Cheshmeh Khan Mohammad
- Ebrahimabad
- Eslamabad
- Esmaeelabad, Mirjaveh
- Esmaeelabad, Zahedan
- Haji Baran
- Haji Karamabad
- Hajiabad-e Aval
- Hajiabad-e Poodchah
- Hajiabad Khazneh Golchat
- Hajiabad-e Dovom
- Hajiabad-e Fajr
- Hajiabad-e Aval Vazhdad
- Hassanabad
- Hosseinabad
- Hosseinabad-e Qanat
- Jamaabad-e Haji Noormohammad
- Jigooli
- Khajeh Mask
- Khanehaye Jan Mohammad
- Khajeh Mehrban
- Kheirabad-e Bala
- Palangiabad, Nosratabad
- Palangiabad, Zahedan
- Palizi
- Pirchah
- Tavakolabad
- Tavakolabad Hoorshi
