= Chenali =

Chenali چنالي
- Village
- Location within Iran
- Coordinates: 25°38′03″N 58°46′37″E
- Country: Iran
- Province: Hormozgan
- County: Jask
- Bakhsh: Lirdaf
- Rural District: Surak

Population (2006)
  - Total: 514
- Time zone: UTC+3:30 (IRST)
  - Summer (DST): UTC+4:30 (IRDT)

Chenali (Persian: چنالي, also Romanized as Chenālī and Chanali) is a village in Surak Rural District, Lirdaf District, Jask County, Hormozgan Province, Iran. At the 2006 census, its population was 514, in 124 families.
