= Palgi, Hirmand =

Palgi پلگي
- Village
- Location within Iran
- Coordinates: 31°14′06″N 61°41′39″E
- Country: Iran
- Province: Sistan and Baluchestan
- County: Hirmand
- Bakhsh: Qorqori
- Rural District: Qorqori

Population (2006)
  - Total: 151
- Time zone: UTC+3:30 (IRST)
  - Summer (DST): UTC+4:30 (IRDT)

Palgi (Persian: پلگي, also Romanized as Palgī and Polagī; also known as Polakī) is a village in Qorqori Rural District, Qorqori District, Hirmand County, Sistan and Baluchestan Province, Iran. At the 2006 census, its population was 151, in 37 families.
