= Galugah, Kerman =

Galugah گلوگاه
- Village
- Location within Iran
- Coordinates: 29°10′41″N 57°23′41″E
- Country: Iran
- Province: Kerman
- County: Jiroft
- Bakhsh: Sarduiyeh
- Rural District: Sarduiyeh

Population (2006)
  - Total: 57
- Time zone: UTC+3:30 (IRST)
  - Summer (DST): UTC+4:30 (IRDT)

Galugah (Persian: گلوگاه, also Romanized as Galūgāh, Galū Gāh, and Gelūgāh; also known as Galīga) is a village in Sarduiyeh Rural District, Sarduiyeh District, Jiroft County, Kerman Province, Iran. At the 2006 census, its population was 57, in 12 families.
