= Shuruiyeh-ye Olya =

Shuruiyeh-ye Olya شوروييه عليا
- Village
- Location within Iran
- Coordinates: 29°57′00″N 55°53′00″E
- Country: Iran
- Province: Kerman
- County: Sirjan
- Bakhsh: Pariz
- Rural District: Pariz

Population (2006)
  - Total: 19
- Time zone: UTC+3:30 (IRST)
  - Summer (DST): UTC+4:30 (IRDT)

Shuruiyeh-ye Olya (Persian: شوروييه عليا, also Romanized as Shūrū’īyeh-ye ‘Olyā; also known as Shuru and Shūrū’īyeh) is a village in Pariz Rural District, Pariz District, Sirjan County, Kerman Province, Iran. According to the 2006 census, its population was 19, in 7 families.
