= Palangabad-e Olya =

Palangabad-e Olya پلنگ ابادعليا
- Village
- Location within Iran
- Coordinates: 36°43′36″N 51°01′20″E
- Country: Iran
- Province: Mazandaran
- County: Tonekabon
- Bakhsh: Nashta
- Rural District: Tameshkol

Population (2006)
  - Total: 317
- Time zone: UTC+3:30 (IRST)
  - Summer (DST): UTC+4:30 (IRDT)

Palangabad-e Olya (Persian: پلنگ ابادعليا, also Romanized as Palangābād-e ‘Olyā; also known as Palangābād-e Bālā) is a village in Tameshkol Rural District, Nashta District, Tonekabon County, Mazandaran Province, Iran. At the 2006 census, its population was 317, in 87 families.
