= Palangabad, Kerman =

Palangabad پلنگ اباد
- Village
- Location within Iran
- Coordinates: 29°22′23″N 56°30′06″E
- Country: Iran
- Province: Kerman
- County: Baft
- Bakhsh: Central
- Rural District: Fathabad

Population (2006)
  - Total: 27
- Time zone: UTC+3:30 (IRST)
  - Summer (DST): UTC+4:30 (IRDT)

Palangabad (Persian: پلنگ اباد, also Romanized as Palangābād; also known as Palangī) is a village in Fathabad Rural District, in the Central District of Baft County, Kerman Province, Iran. At the 2006 census, its population was 27, in 9 families.
