= Omrabad, Hamadan =

Omrabad عمراباد
- Village
- Location within Iran
- Coordinates: 35°05′33″N 49°14′46″E
- Country: Iran
- Province: Hamadan
- County: Famenin
- Bakhsh: Pish Khowr
- Rural District: Pish Khowr

Population (2006)
  - Total: 155
- Time zone: UTC+3:30 (IRST)
  - Summer (DST): UTC+4:30 (IRDT)

Omrabad (Persian: عمراباد, also Romanized as ‘Omrābād, Umrābād, ‘Amrābad, and ‘Omarābād) is a village in Pish Khowr Rural District, Pish Khowr District, Famenin County, Hamadan Province, Iran. At the 2006 census, its population was 155, in 38 families.
