= Nowghab-e Afzalabad =

Nowghab-e Afzalabad نوغاب افضل‌آباد
- village
- Location within Iran
- Coordinates: 33°06′56″N 59°11′37″E
- Country: Iran
- Province: South Khorasan
- County: Birjand
- Bakhsh: Central
- Rural District: Fasharud
- Elevation: 1,743 m (5,719 ft)

Population (2016)
  - Total: 146
- Time zone: UTC+3:30 (IRST)
  - Summer (DST): UTC+4:30 (IRDT)

Nowghab-e Afzalabad (Persian: نوغاب افضل اباد, also Romanized as Nowghāb-e Afzalābād; also known as Nowghāb, Afzalābād, Naughāb, and Nūghāb) is a village in Fasharud Rural District, in the Central District of Birjand County, South Khorasan Province, Iran. At the 2016 census, its population was 125, in 56 families.
