= Omarabad, West Azerbaijan =

Omarabad عمراباد
- Village
- Location within Iran
- Coordinates: 37°44′11″N 44°42′25″E
- Country: Iran
- Province: West Azerbaijan
- County: Urmia
- Bakhsh: Sumay-ye Beradust
- Rural District: Beradust

Population (2006)
  - Total: 440
- Time zone: UTC+3:30 (IRST)
  - Summer (DST): UTC+4:30 (IRDT)

Omarabad (Persian: عمراباد, also Romanized as ‘Omarābād) is a village in Beradust Rural District, Sumay-ye Beradust District, Urmia County, West Azerbaijan Province, Iran. At the 2006 census, its population was 440, in 78 families.
