= Afzalabad, Iranshahr =

Afzalabad افضل اباد
- Village
- Interactive map of Afzalabad
- Coordinates: 27°18′N 60°46′E
- Country: Iran
- Province: Sistan and Baluchestan
- County: Iranshahr
- Bakhsh: Central
- Rural District: Damen

Population (2006)
  - Total: 191
- Time zone: UTC+3:30 (IRST)
  - Summer (DST): UTC+4:30 (IRDT)

Afzalabad (Persian: افضل اباد, also Romanized as Āfẕalābād) is a village in Damen Rural District, in the Central District of Iranshahr County, Sistan and Baluchestan Province, Iran. At the 2006 census, its population was 191, in 39 families.
