= Hormak, Kerman =

Hormak حرمك
- Village
- Location within Iran
- Coordinates: 29°38′32″N 57°54′51″E
- Country: Iran
- Province: Kerman
- County: Kerman
- Bakhsh: Golbaf
- Rural District: Keshit

Population (2006)
  - Total: 690
- Time zone: UTC+3:30 (IRST)
  - Summer (DST): UTC+4:30 (IRDT)

Hormak, Golbaf, Kerman

Hormak (Persian: حرمك, also Romanized as Ḩormak; also known as Hormūk) is a village in Keshit Rural District, Golbaf District, Kerman County, Kerman Province, Iran. At the 2006 census, its population was 690, in 161 families.
