= Amrabad, Khamareh =

Amrabad عمراباد
- Village
- Location within Iran
- Coordinates: 29°35′28″N 53°13′51″E
- Country: Iran
- Province: Fars
- County: Kharameh
- Bakhsh: Central
- Rural District: Korbal

Population (2006)
  - Total: 29
- Time zone: UTC+3:30 (IRST)
  - Summer (DST): UTC+4:30 (IRDT)

Amrabad (Persian: عمراباد, also Romanized as 'Amrābād) is a village in Korbal Rural District, in the Central District of Kharameh County, Fars province, Iran. At the 2006 census, its population was 29, in 4 families.
