= Amrabad, Kazerun =

Amrabad امراباد
- Village
- Location within Iran
- Coordinates: 29°44′06″N 51°31′31″E
- Country: Iran
- Province: Fars
- County: Kazerun
- Bakhsh: Central
- Rural District: Deris

Population (2006)
  - Total: 297
- Time zone: UTC+3:30 (IRST)
  - Summer (DST): UTC+4:30 (IRDT)

Amrabad (Persian: امراباد, also Romanized as Amrābād) is a village in Deris Rural District, in the Central District of Kazerun County, Fars province, Iran. At the 2006 census, its population was 297, in 68 families.
