= Dumak Rural District =

Rural district in Sistan and Baluchestan province, Iran

Dumak Rural District Persian: دهستان دومک
- Rural District
- Location within Iran
- Coordinates: 29°15′41″N 60°22′39″E
- Country: Iran
- Province: Sistan and Baluchestan
- County: Zahedan
- District: Nosratabad
- Capital: Dumak

Population (2016)
  - Total: 5,437
- Time zone: UTC+3:30 (IRST)

Dumak Rural District (Persian: دهستان دومک) is in Nosratabad District of Zahedan County, Sistan and Baluchestan province, Iran. Its capital is the village of Dumak.

== Demographics ==
=== Population ===
At the time of the 2006 National Census, the rural district's population was 6,746 in 1,286 households. There were 4,581 inhabitants in 947 households at the following census of 2011. The 2016 census measured the population of the rural district as 5,437 in 1,316 households. The most populous of its 170 villages was Chah-e Zard, with 675 people.

== Villages ==
- Hosseinabad, Corrin
- Pardalabad, Zahedan
