= Kurin District =

District in Sistan and Baluchestan province, Iran

Kurin District Persian: بخش کورین
- District
- Location within Iran
- Coordinates: 28°52′41″N 60°07′01″E
- Country: Iran
- Province: Sistan and Baluchestan
- County: Zahedan
- Capital: Sar Jangal

Population (2016)
  - Total: 25,898
- Time zone: UTC+3:30 (IRST)

Kurin District (Persian: بخش کورین) is in Zahedan County, Sistan and Baluchestan province, Iran. Its capital is the city of Sar Jangal.

== History ==
After the 2016 National Census, the village of Sar Jangal was elevated to the status of a city.

== Demographics ==
=== Population ===
At the time of the 2006 census, the district's population was 23,138 in 4,391 households. The following census in 2011 counted 18,048 people in 4,166 households. The 2016 census measured the population of the district as 25,898 inhabitants in 6,694 households.

=== Administrative divisions ===
Kurin District Population
Administrative Divisions	2006	2011	2016
Kurin RD	15,885	12,264	17,764
Shuru RD	7,253	5,784	8,134
Sar Jangal (city) (Note: Became a city after the 2016 census)			
Total	23,138	18,048	25,898
RD = Rural District
