= Ladiz Rural District =

Rural district in Sistan and Baluchestan province, Iran

Ladiz Rural District Persian: دهستان لاديز
- Rural District
- Location within Iran
- Coordinates: 28°55′38″N 61°12′26″E
- Country: Iran
- Province: Sistan and Baluchestan
- County: Mirjaveh
- District: Ladiz
- Capital: Ladiz-e Sofla

Government
  - Bakhsh Daar: Ehsanullah Riggi

Area
  - Total: 4,000 km^{2} (1,500 sq mi)

Population (2016)
  - Total: 7,981
  - Density: 2.0/km^{2} (5.2/sq mi)
- Time zone: UTC+3:30 (IRST)

Ladiz Rural District (Persian: دهستان لاديز) is in Ladiz District of Mirjaveh County, Sistan and Baluchestan province, Iran. Its capital is the village of Ladiz-e Sofla.

== Demographics ==
=== Population ===
At the time of the 2006 National Census, the rural district's population (as a part of the former Mirjaveh District of Zahedan County) was 23,953 in 4,436 households. There were 21,712 inhabitants in 5,041 households at the following census of 2011. The 2016 census measured the population of the rural district as 7,981 in 2,131 households, by which time the district had been separated from the county in the establishment of Mirjaveh County. The rural district was transferred to the new Ladiz District. The most populous of the rural district's 44 villages was Mohammadabad-e Suran, with 708 people.

== Villages ==
- Ahmadabad-e Almasaki
- Ahooab
- Alnajan-e Do
- Apkachushan
- Bakjood
- Barakatabad
- Barzyar
- Bidlang
- Boogakabad
- Cheshmeh Bid
- Eslamabad Qanat Shahbaz
- Hassanabad
- Hori
- Hosseinabad, Khodarahm Rigi
- Hosseinabad Bazi
- Jabarkooteh
- Jan Mohammad
- Jan Mohammadchahi
- Kheirabad
- Khodasooli
- Khosh Ab
- Palizi Dargiaban
- Parviz
- Pepbi Bala
- Pepbi Paeen (Hakimabad)
- Poshtrood
- Tahrood
- Tavakolabad
- Tohibad

== See also ==
- Allahabad, Zahedan
