= Hormak Rural District =

Rural district in Sistan and Baluchestan province, Iran

Hormak Rural District Persian: دهستان حرمک
- Rural District
- Location within Iran
- Coordinates: 29°55′36″N 60°44′25″E
- Country: Iran
- Province: Sistan and Baluchestan
- County: Zahedan
- District: Central
- Capital: Hormak

Population (2016)
  - Total: 5,796
- Time zone: UTC+3:30 (IRST)

Hormak Rural District (Persian: دهستان حرمک) is in the Central District of Zahedan County, Sistan and Baluchestan province, Iran. Its capital is the village of Hormak.

== Demographics ==
=== Population ===
At the time of the 2006 National Census, the rural district's population was 3,242 in 619 households. There were 4,270 inhabitants in 1,017 households at the following census of 2011. The 2016 census measured the population of the rural district as 5,796 in 1,457 households. The most populous of its 113 villages was Rahimabad, with 1,968 people.

== Villages ==
- Book
