= Shuru Rural District =

Rural district in Sistan and Baluchestan province, Iran

Shuru Rural District Persian: دهستان شورو
- Rural District
- Location within Iran
- Coordinates: 29°01′32″N 60°02′21″E
- Country: Iran
- Province: Sistan and Baluchestan
- County: Zahedan
- District: Kurin
- Capital: Shuru

Population (2016)
  - Total: 8,134
- Time zone: UTC+3:30 (IRST)

Shuru Rural District (Persian: دهستان شورو) is in Kurin District of Zahedan County, Sistan and Baluchestan province, Iran. Its capital is the village of Shuru.

== Demographics ==
=== Population ===
At the time of the 2006 National Census, the rural district's population was 7,253 in 1,386 households. There were 5,784 inhabitants in 1,222 households at the following census of 2011. The 2016 census measured the population of the rural district as 8,134 in 1,993 households. The most populous of its 166 villages was Shahrak-e Mohammadabad, with 1,159 people.
