= Kurin Rural District =

Rural district in Sistan and Baluchestan province, Iran

Kurin Rural District Persian: دهستان کورین
- Rural District
- Location within Iran
- Coordinates: 28°48′28″N 60°07′01″E
- Country: Iran
- Province: Sistan and Baluchestan
- County: Zahedan
- District: Kurin
- Capital: Sar Jangal

Population (2016)
  - Total: 17,764
- Time zone: UTC+3:30 (IRST)

Kurin Rural District (Persian: دهستان کورین) is in Kurin District of Zahedan County, Sistan and Baluchestan province, Iran. It is administered from the city of Sar Jangal.

== Demographics ==
=== Population ===
At the time of the 2006 National Census, the rural district's population was 15,885 in 3,005 households. There were 12,264 inhabitants in 2,944 households at the following census of 2011. The 2016 census measured the population of the rural district as 17,764 in 4,701 households. The most populous of its 410 villages was Sar Jangal (now a city), with 1,790 people.

== Villages ==
*Allahabad Doomak
- Chanali, Zahedan
- Emamabad, Corrin
- Esmaeelabad, Nosratabad
- Pir Mohammad, Zahedan
- Tavakolabad, Corrin
- Tavakolabad Minooie
- Tavakolabad, Mirjaveh
