= Nosratabad Rural District (Zahedan County) =

Rural district in Sistan and Baluchestan province, Iran

Nosratabad Rural District Persian: دهستان نصرت‌آباد
- Rural District
- Location within Iran
- Coordinates: 29°55′51″N 59°59′13″E
- Country: Iran
- Province: Sistan and Baluchestan
- County: Zahedan
- District: Nosratabad
- Capital: Shahrak-e Hesaruiyeh

Population (2016)
  - Total: 7,787
- Time zone: UTC+3:30 (IRST)

Nosratabad Rural District (Persian: دهستان نصرت‌آباد) is in Nosratabad District of Zahedan County, Sistan and Baluchestan province, Iran. Its capital is the village of Shahrak-e Hesaruiyeh. The previous capital of the rural district was the village of Nosratabad, now a city.

== Demographics ==
=== Population ===
At the time of the 2006 National Census, the rural district's population was 5,962 in 1,134 households. There were 6,457 inhabitants in 1,531 households at the following census of 2011. The 2016 census measured the population of the rural district as 7,787 in 2,211 households. The most populous of its 252 villages was Shahrak-e Garagheh, with 751 people.

== Villages ==
- Abdoozak-e Paeen
- Anjarak-e Bala
- Anjirak-e Paeen
- Anooshiravan
- Hosseinabad-e Chahrahman
- Jangooneh
- Oskooh
- Padshahi Balasiah-e Loop
- Paygah-e Roodmahi
- Poorjangi
