= Tamin Rural District =

Rural district in Sistan and Baluchestan province, Iran

Tamin Rural District Persian: دهستان تمين
- Rural District
- Location within Iran
- Coordinates: 28°42′37″N 61°08′43″E
- Country: Iran
- Province: Sistan and Baluchestan
- County: Mirjaveh
- District: Ladiz
- Capital: Tamin

Population (2016)
  - Total: 8,524
- Time zone: UTC+3:30 (IRST)

Tamin Rural District (Persian: دهستان تمين) is in Ladiz District of Mirjaveh County, Sistan and Baluchestan province, Iran. Its capital is the village of Tamin.

== Demographics ==
=== Population ===
At the time of the 2006 National Census, the rural district's population (as a part of the former Mirjaveh District of Zahedan County) was 8,353 in 1,695 households. There were 8,040 inhabitants in 2,209 households at the following census of 2011. The 2016 census measured the population of the rural district as 8,524 in 2,590 households, by which time the district had been separated from the county in the establishment of Mirjaveh County. The rural district was transferred to the new Ladiz District. The most populous of the rural district's 63 villages was Tamin, with 762 people.

== Villages ==
- Anjarak-e Paeen
- Anjareh
- Bandabi (Bandak Siah)
- Bariz, Zahedan
- Bon deh
- Boorta
- Hassanak
- Hosseinabad
- Jangal Baqi
- Jeyhoonak-e Paeen
- Jolgeh Anjarak
- Khazoon
