= Nosratabad District =

District in Sistan and Baluchestan province, Iran

Nosratabad District Persian: بخش نصرت‌آباد
- District
- Location within Iran
- Coordinates: 29°55′51″N 59°59′13″E
- Country: Iran
- Province: Sistan and Baluchestan
- County: Zahedan
- Capital: Nosratabad

Population (2016)
  - Total: 18,462
- Time zone: UTC+3:30 (IRST)

Nosratabad District (Persian: بخش نصرت‌آباد) is in Zahedan County, Sistan and Baluchestan province, Iran. Its capital is the city of Nosratabad.

== Demographics ==
=== Population ===
At the time of the 2006 National Census, the district's population was 16,890 in 3,339 households. The following census in 2011 counted 15,308 people in 3,409 households. The 2016 census measured the population of the district as 18,462 inhabitants in 4,782 households.

=== Administrative divisions ===
Nosratabad District Population
Administrative Divisions	2006	2011	2016
Dumak RD	6,746	4,581	5,437
Nosratabad RD	5,962	6,457	7,787
Nosratabad (city)	4,182	4,270	5,238
Total	16,890	15,308	18,462
RD = Rural District
