= Corrin =

Names
- IUPAC name (5Z,9Z,14Z)-2,3,7,8,12,13,17,18,19,22-Decahydro-1H-corrin

Identifiers
CAS Number	262-76-0
3D model (JSmol)	Interactive image
ChEBI	CHEBI:33221
ChemSpider	16736705
PubChem CID	6438343
UNII	288E04GRMT
CompTox Dashboard (EPA)	DTXSID70893668
- InChI: InChI=1S/C19H22N4/c1-3-14-10-16-5-7-18(22-16)19-8-6-17(23-19)11-15-4-2-13(21-15)9-12(1)20-14/h9-11,18-19,22H,1-8H2/b12-9-,15-11-,16-10- Key: WUPRCGRRQUZFAB-DEGKJRJSSA-N; InChI=1/C19H22N4/c1-3-14-10-16-5-7-18(22-16)19-8-6-17(23-19)11-15-4-2-13(21-15)9-12(1)20-14/h9-11,18-19,22H,1-8H2/b12-9-,15-11-,16-10- Key: WUPRCGRRQUZFAB-DEGKJRJSBL
- SMILES: N=1C=4CCC=1\C=C2/NC(CC2)C\5CC/C(C=C3\CC/C(=N3)/C=4)=N/5

Properties
Chemical formula	C_{19}H_{22}N_{4}
Molar mass	306.40478
- Except where otherwise noted, data are given for materials in their standard state (at 25 °C [77 °F], 100 kPa). verify (what is ?) Infobox references

Corrin is a heterocyclic compound. Although not known to exist on its own, the molecule is of interest as the parent macrocycle related to the cofactor and chromophore in vitamin B_{12}. Its name reflects that it is the "core" of vitamin B_{12} (cobalamins). Compounds with a corrin core are known as "corrins".

There are two chiral centres, which in natural compounds like cobalamin have the same stereochemistry.

== Coordination chemistry ==
Upon deprotonation, the corrinoid ring is capable of binding cobalt. In vitamin B_{12}, the resulting complex also features a benzimidazole-derived ligand, and the sixth site on the octahedron serves as the catalytic center.

The corrin ring resembles the porphyrin ring. Both feature four pyrrole-like subunits organized into rings. Corrins have a central 15-membered C_{11}N_{4} ring whereas porphyrins have an interior 16-membered C_{12}N_{4} ring. All four nitrogen centers are linked by conjugation structure, with alternating double and single bonds. In contrast to porphyrins, corrins lack one of the carbon groups that link the pyrrole-like units into a fully conjugated structure. With a conjugated system that extends only 3/4 of the way around the ring, and does not include any of the outer edge carbons, corrins have a number of non-conjugated sp^{3} carbons, making them more flexible than porphyrins and not as flat. A third closely related biological structure, the chlorin ring system found in chlorophyll, is intermediate between porphyrin and corrin, having 20 carbons like the porphyrins and a conjugated structure extending all the way around the central atom, but with only 6 of the 8 edge carbons participating.

Corroles (octadehydrocorrins) are fully aromatic derivatives of corrins.
