= Mirjaveh =

City in Sistan and Baluchestan province, Iran

Mirjaveh میرجاوه
- City
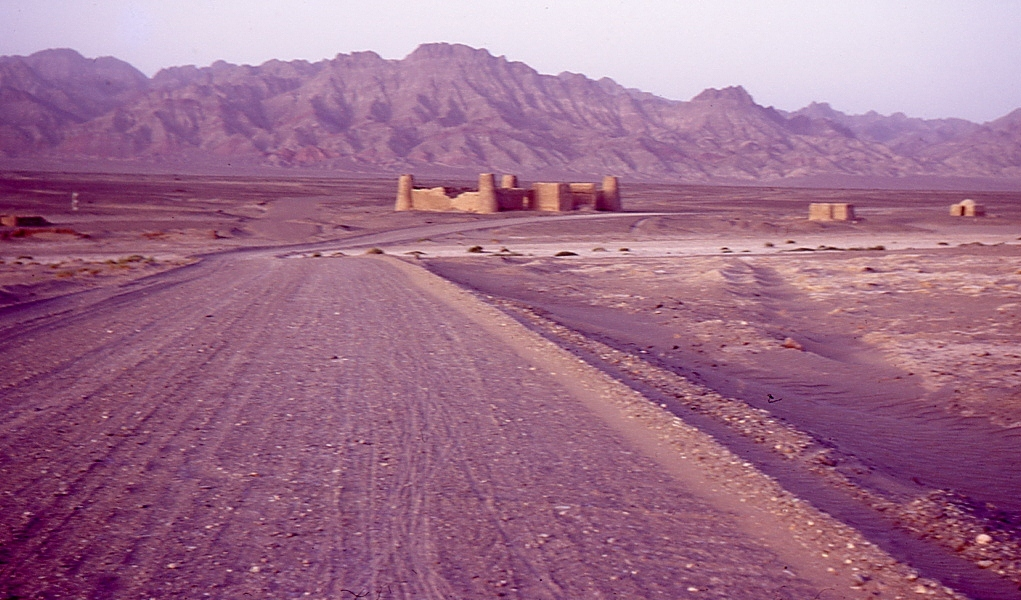
- The road between Mirjaveh and Taftan in 1969

- Location within Iran
- Coordinates: 29°00′53″N 61°27′01″E
- Country: Iran
- Province: Sistan and Baluchestan
- County: Mirjaveh
- District: Central

Population (2016)
  - Total: 9,359
- Time zone: UTC+3:30 (IRST)

Mirjaveh (Persian: میرجاوه) (Note: Also romanized as Mīrjāveh; also known as Mīrjāwa) is a city in the Central District of Mirjaveh County, Sistan and Baluchestan province, Iran, serving as capital of both the county and the district.

== Demographics ==
=== Population ===
At the time of the 2006 National Census, the city's population was 13,590 in 2,350 households, when it was capital of the former Mirjaveh District of Zahedan County. The following census in 2011 counted 10,121 people in 2,135 households, The 2016 census measured the population of the city as 9,359 people in 2,107 households. by which time the district had been separated from the county in the establishment of Mirjaveh County. Mirjaveh was transferred to the new Central District as the county's capital.

Mirjaveh is the main road crossing point between Iran and Pakistan. The Pakistani border post is at Taftan. Mirjaveh is also the point where the railway line from Pakistan crosses the border on the way from Quetta to Zahedan.

== Transport ==
Since the construction of the railway line in 1921, the city has been isolated, with no through connection to any other Iranian Railway system. Around 2007, steps were taken to build a link from the rest of the Iranian Railway system via Bam to connect with the Pakistan Railway system. This link is now finished. As the gauges of the Iranian and Pakistan railways are different, being standard gauge and 5 ft 6 in (1,676 mm) broad gauge respectively, a break-of-gauge station and transshipment hub (or transloading hub) were built at Zahedan.

== See also ==
- Mirjaveh railway station

Pakistan to Turkey container train service launched at Wikinews
