= Central District (Zahedan County) =

District in Sistan and Baluchestan province, Iran

Central District (Zahedan County) Persian: بخش مرکزی شهرستان زاهدان
- District
- Location within Iran
- Coordinates: 29°42′05″N 60°48′00″E
- Country: Iran
- Province: Sistan and Baluchestan
- County: Zahedan
- Capital: Zahedan

Population (2016)
  - Total: 628,219
- Time zone: UTC+3:30 (IRST)

The Central District of Zahedan County (Persian: بخش مرکزی شهرستان زاهدان) is in Sistan and Baluchestan province, Iran. Its capital is the city of Zahedan.

== Demographics ==
=== Population ===
At the time of the 2006 National Census, the district's population was 577,898 in 114,552 households. The following census in 2011 counted 587,156 people in 140,277 households. The 2016 census measured the population of the district as 628,219 inhabitants in 156,995 households.

=== Administrative divisions ===
Central District (Zahedan County) Population
Administrative Divisions	2006	2011	2016
Cheshmeh Ziarat RD	21,950	22,161	34,693
Hormak RD	3,242	4,270	5,796
Zahedan (city)	552,706	560,725	587,730
Total	577,898	587,156	628,219
RD = Rural District
