= Zahedan County =

County in Sistan and Baluchestan province, Iran

Zahedan County Persian: شهرستان زاهدان
- County
- Location of Zahedan County in Sistan and Baluchestan province (top, yellow)

- Location of Sistan and Baluchestan province in Iran
- Coordinates: 29°37′45″N 60°20′50″E
- Country: Iran
- Province: Sistan and Baluchestan
- Capital: Zahedan
- Districts: Central, Kurin, Nosratabad

Population (2016)
  - Total: 672,589
- Time zone: UTC+3:30 (IRST)

Zahedan County (Persian: شهرستان زاهدان) is in Sistan and Baluchestan province, Iran. Its capital is the city of Zahedan.

== History ==
After the 2011 National Census, Mirjaveh District was separated from the county in the establishment of Mirjaveh County. After the 2016 census, the village of Sar Jangal was elevated to the status of a city.

== Demographics ==
=== Population ===
At the time of the 2006 census, the county's population was 663,822 in 130,763 households. The following census in 2011 counted 660,575 people in 157,139 households. The 2016 census measured the population of the county as 672,589 in 168,480 households.

=== Administrative divisions ===
Zahedan County's population history and administrative structure over three consecutive censuses are shown in the following table.

Zahedan County Population
Administrative Divisions	2006	2011	2016
Central District	577,898	587,156	628,219
Cheshmeh Ziarat RD	21,950	22,161	34,693
Hormak RD	3,242	4,270	5,796
Zahedan (city)	552,706	560,725	587,730
Kurin District	23,138	18,048	25,898
Kurin RD	15,885	12,264	17,764
Shuru RD	7,253	5,784	8,134
Sar Jangal (city) (Note: Became a city after the 2016 census)			
Mirjaveh District (Note: Transferred to Mirjaveh County)	45,896	39,873	
Ladiz RD	23,953	21,712	
Tamin RD	8,353	8,040	
Mirjaveh (city)	13,590	10,121	
Nosratabad District	16,890	15,308	18,462
Dumak RD	6,746	4,581	5,437
Nosratabad RD	5,962	6,457	7,787
Nosratabad (city)	4,182	4,270	5,238
Total	663,822	660,575	672,589
RD = Rural District

== See also ==
Media related to Zahedan County at Wikimedia Commons
