= Chahak =

Chahak (Persian: چاهك) may refer to:

- Chahak, Bushehr
- Chahak, Chaharmahal and Bakhtiari
- Chahak, Anbarabad, Kerman Province
- Chahak, Jiroft, Kerman Province
- Chahak, Manujan, Kerman Province
- Chahak, Qaleh Ganj, Kerman Province
- Chahak, Kohgiluyeh and Boyer-Ahmad
- Chahak, Qom
- Chahak, Khoshab, Razavi Khorasan Province
- Chahak, Dalgan, Sistan and Baluchestan Province
- Chahak, Eskelabad, Khash County, Sistan and Baluchestan Province
- Chahak, South Khorasan
- Chahak, Yazd
- Chahak Rural District, in Yazd Province
