= Chahuk =

Chahuk or Chahook (Persian: چاهوك) may refer to:

- Chahuk, Bushehr
- Chahuk, Dashtestan
- Chahuk, Kerman
- Chahuk, Razavi Khorasan
- Chahuk, Iranshahr, Sistan and Baluchestan Province
- Chahuk-e Mehrab, Iranshahr County, Sistan and Baluchestan Province
- Chahuk, Khash, Sistan and Baluchestan Province
- Chahuk, Yazd
