= Haj Gami =

Village in Sistan and Baluchestan province, Iran

Haj Gami Persian: حاج گمی
- Village
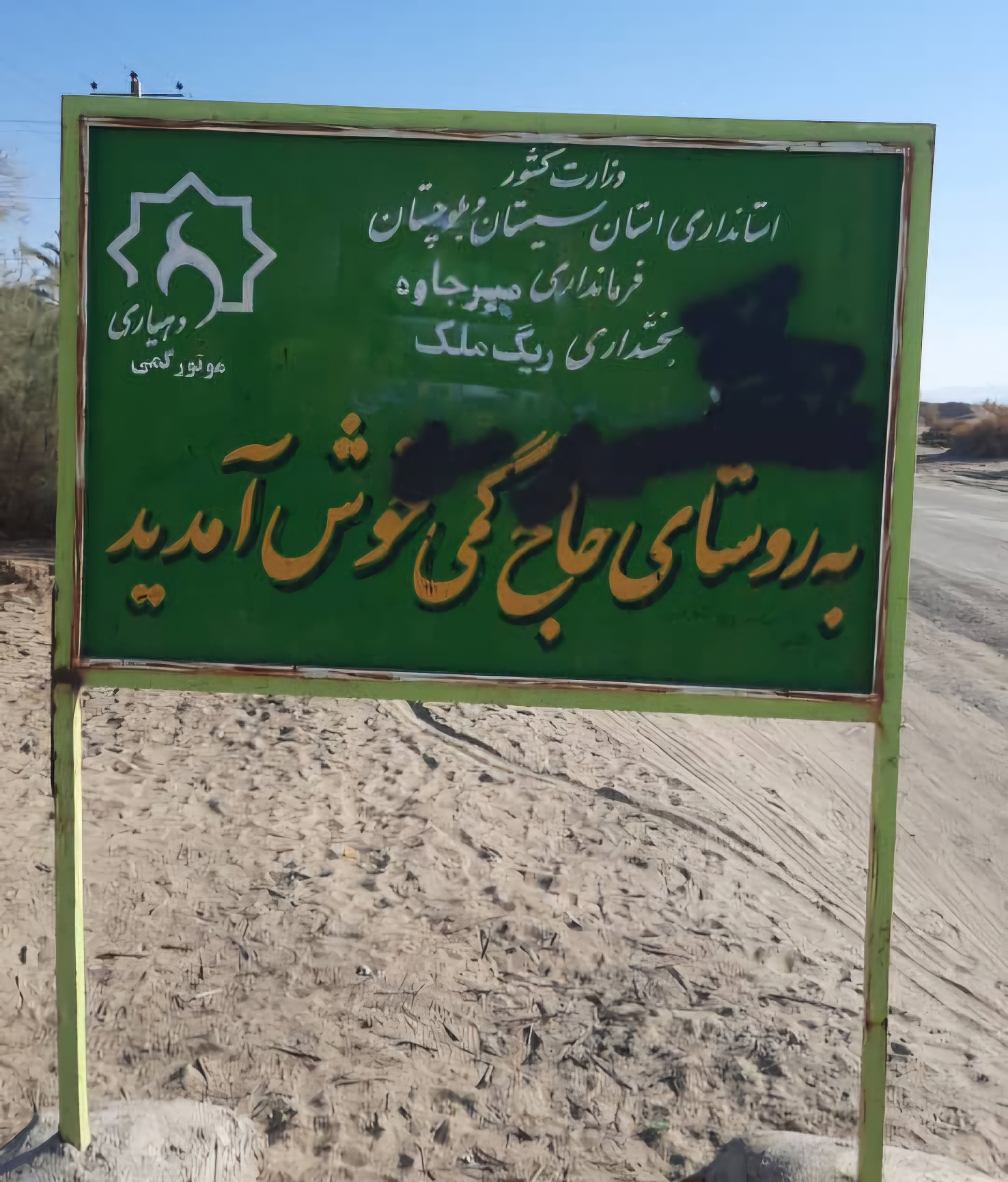

- Location within Iran
- Coordinates: 28°37′1″N 61°50′5″E
- Country: Iran
- Province: Sistan and Baluchestan
- County: Mirjaveh
- District: Rig-e Malek
- Rural District: Tahlab

Population (2016)
  - Total: 327
- Time zone: UTC+3:30 (IRST)

Haj Gami (Persian: حاج گمی) (Note: Also known as Tahlab (تهلاب)) is a village in, and the capital of, Tahlab Rural District of Rig-e Malek District, Mirjaveh County, Sistan and Baluchestan province, Iran.

== Demographics ==
=== Population ===
At the time of the 2006 National Census, the village's population was 422 in 65 households, when it was in Ladiz Rural District of the former Mirjaveh District of Zahedan County. The following census in 2011 counted 769 people in 196 households. The 2016 census measured the population of the village as 327 people in 93 households, by which time the district had been separated from the county in the establishment of Mirjaveh County. The rural district was transferred to the new Ladiz District, and Mowtowr-e Gami was transferred to Tahlab Rural District created in the new Rig-e Malek District.
