= Andeh, Mirjaveh =

Village in Sistan and Baluchestan province, Iran

Andeh Persian: انده
- Village
- Location within Iran
- Coordinates: 28°51′27″N 61°27′12″E
- Country: Iran
- Province: Sistan and Baluchestan
- County: Mirjaveh
- District: Central
- Rural District: Andeh

Population (2016)
  - Total: 326
- Time zone: UTC+3:30 (IRST)

Andeh (Persian: انده) is a village in, and the capital of, Andeh Rural District of the Central District of Mirjaveh County, Sistan and Baluchestan province, Iran.

== Demographics ==
=== Population ===
At the time of the 2006 National Census, the village's population was 358 in 58 households, when it was in Ladiz Rural District of the former Mirjaveh District of Zahedan County. The following census in 2011 counted 431 people in 99 households. The 2016 census measured the population of the village as 326 people in 81 households, by which time the district had been separated from the county in the establishment of Mirjaveh County. The rural district was transferred to the new Ladiz District, and Andeh was transferred to Andeh Rural District created in the new Central District.
