= Kar Gazi, Sistan and Baluchestan =

Village in Sistan and Baluchestan province, Iran

Kar Gazi Persian: کرگزي
- Village
- Country: Iran
- Province: Sistan and Baluchestan
- County: Mirjaveh
- District: Central
- Rural District: Howmeh

Population (2016)
  - Total: 132
- Time zone: UTC+3:30 (IRST)

Kar Gazi (Persian: کرگزي) is a village in Howmeh Rural District of the Central District of Mirjaveh County, Sistan and Baluchestan province, Iran.

== Demographics ==
=== Population ===
At the time of the 2011 National Census, the village's population was 65 people in 24 households, when it was in Ladiz Rural District of the former Mirjaveh District of Zahedan County. The 2016 census measured the population of the village as 132 people in 43 households, by which time the district had been separated from the county in the establishment of Mirjaveh County. The rural district was transferred to the new Ladiz District, and Kar Gazi was transferred to Howmeh Rural District created in the new Central District. Kar Gazi was the most populous village in its rural district.
