= Fathabad, Sistan and Baluchestan =

Village in Sistan and Baluchestan province, Iran

Fathabad Persian: فتح اباد
- Village
- Location within Iran
- Coordinates: 28°51′59″N 61°26′37″E
- Country: Iran
- Province: Sistan and Baluchestan
- County: Mirjaveh
- District: Central
- Rural District: Andeh

Population (2016)
  - Total: 435
- Time zone: UTC+3:30 (IRST)

Fathabad (Persian: فتح اباد) is a village in Andeh Rural District of the Central District of Mirjaveh County, Sistan and Baluchestan province, Iran.

== Demographics ==
=== Population ===
At the time of the 2006 National Census, the village's population was 294 in 55 households, when it was in Ladiz Rural District of the former Mirjaveh District of Zahedan County. The following census in 2011 counted 318 people in 63 households. The 2016 census measured the population of the village as 435 people in 96 households, by which time the district had been separated from the county in the establishment of Mirjaveh County. The rural district was transferred to the new Ladiz District, and Andeh was transferred to Andeh Rural District created in the new Central District. It was the most populous village in its rural district.
