= Tomp-e Rigan =

Tomp-e Rigan تمپريگان
- Village
- Location within Iran
- Coordinates: 27°15′14″N 60°43′22″E
- Country: Iran
- Province: Sistan and Baluchestan
- County: Iranshahr
- Bakhsh: Central
- Rural District: Howmeh

Population (2006)
  - Total: 543
- Time zone: UTC+3:30 (IRST)
  - Summer (DST): UTC+4:30 (IRDT)

Tomp-e Rigan (Persian: تمپريگان, also Romanized as Tomp-e Rīgān; also known as Tokhm-e Rīgān) is a village in Howmeh Rural District, in the Central District of Iranshahr County, Sistan and Baluchestan Province, Iran. At the 2006 census, its population was 543, in 105 families.
