= Surgu =

Surgu سورگو
- Village
- Location within Iran
- Coordinates: 27°13′00″N 60°52′00″E
- Country: Iran
- Province: Sistan and Baluchestan
- County: Iranshahr
- Bakhsh: Central
- Rural District: Abtar

Population (2006)
  - Total: 44
- Time zone: UTC+3:30 (IRST)
  - Summer (DST): UTC+4:30 (IRDT)

Surgu (Persian: سورگو, also Romanized as Sūrgū) is a village in Abtar Rural District, in the Central District of Iranshahr County, Sistan and Baluchestan Province, Iran. At the 2006 census, its population was 44, in 11 families.
