= Kuran-e Sofla =

Village in Sistan and Baluchestan province, Iran

Kuran-e Sofla Persian: كوران سفلي
- Village
- Location within Iran
- Coordinates: 27°24′29″N 60°49′00″E
- Country: Iran
- Province: Sistan and Baluchestan
- County: Iranshahr
- District: Damen
- Rural District: Damen

Population (2016)
  - Total: 910
- Time zone: UTC+3:30 (IRST)

Kuran-e Sofla (Persian: كوران سفلي) (Note: Also romanized as Kūrān-e Soflá; also known as Kooran Soofla and Kūrān-e Pā‘īn) is a village in, and the capital of, Damen Rural District of Damen District, Iranshahr County, Sistan and Baluchestan province, Iran. The previous capital of the rural district was the village of Zehlenfan.

== Demographics ==
=== Population ===
At the time of the 2006 National Census, the village's population was 1,384 in 216 households, when it was in the Central District. The following census in 2011 counted 1,023 people in 255 households. The 2016 census measured the population of the village as 910 people in 246 households.

After the census, the rural district was separated from the district in the formation of Damen District.
