= Sarnajdani =

Sarnajdani سرنجداني
- Village
- Interactive map of Sarnajdani
- Country: Iran
- Province: Sistan and Baluchestan
- County: Iranshahr
- Bakhsh: Central
- Rural District: Abtar

Population (2006)
  - Total: 393
- Time zone: UTC+3:30 (IRST)
  - Summer (DST): UTC+4:30 (IRDT)

Sarnajdani (Persian: سرنجداني, also Romanized as Sarnajdānī) is a village in Abtar Rural District, in the Central District of Iranshahr County, Sistan and Baluchestan Province, Iran. At the 2006 census, its population was 393, in 79 families.
