= Mian Chah =

Mian Chah ميان چاه
- Village
- Country: Iran
- Province: Sistan and Baluchestan
- County: Iranshahr
- Bakhsh: Bazman
- Rural District: Abreis

Population (2006)
  - Total: 40
- Time zone: UTC+3:30 (IRST)
  - Summer (DST): UTC+4:30 (IRDT)

Mian Chah (Persian: ميان چاه, also Romanized as Mīān Chāh) is a village in southeastern Iran. It is located in the Abreis Rural District, Bazman District, Iranshahr County, Sistan and Baluchestan Province. At the 2006 census, the village's population was measured as 40 residents, divided across 10 families.
