= Katukan, Iranshahr =

Katukan كتوكان
- Village
- Location within Iran
- Coordinates: 27°17′52″N 60°50′09″E
- Country: Iran
- Province: Sistan and Baluchestan
- County: Iranshahr
- Bakhsh: Central
- Rural District: Abtar

Population (2006)
  - Total: 455
- Time zone: UTC+3:30 (IRST)
  - Summer (DST): UTC+4:30 (IRDT)

Katukan (Persian: كتوكان, also Romanized as Katūkān and Katookan) is a village in Abtar Rural District, in the Central District of Iranshahr County, Sistan and Baluchestan Province, Iran. At the 2006 census, its population was 455, in 90 families.
