= Siahti Kalat =

Siahti Kalat سياه تي كلات
- Village
- Location within Iran
- Coordinates: 27°03′23″N 61°01′48″E
- Country: Iran
- Province: Sistan and Baluchestan
- County: Iranshahr
- Bakhsh: Central
- Rural District: Abtar

Population (2006)
  - Total: 102
- Time zone: UTC+3:30 (IRST)
  - Summer (DST): UTC+4:30 (IRDT)

Siahti Kalat (Persian: سياه تي كلات, also Romanized as Sīāhtī Kalāt) is a village in Abtar Rural District, in the Central District of Iranshahr County, Sistan and Baluchestan Province, Iran. At the 2006 census, its population was 102, in 21 families.
