= Sar Taruna =

Sar Taruna سرترونا
- Village
- Location within Iran
- Coordinates: 27°03′53″N 61°19′21″E
- Country: Iran
- Province: Sistan and Baluchestan
- County: Iranshahr
- Bakhsh: Central
- Rural District: Abtar

Population (2006)
  - Total: 33
- Time zone: UTC+3:30 (IRST)
  - Summer (DST): UTC+4:30 (IRDT)

Sar Taruna (Persian: سرترونا, also Romanized as Sar Tarūnā; also known as Sar Tanūrān) is a village in Abtar Rural District, in the Central District of Iranshahr County, Sistan and Baluchestan Province, Iran. At the 2006 census, its population was 33, in 8 families.
