= Qaleh-ye Tarvan =

Qaleh-ye Tarvan قلعه تاروان
- Village
- Location within Iran
- Coordinates: 27°26′53″N 60°49′40″E
- Country: Iran
- Province: Sistan and Baluchestan
- County: Iranshahr
- Bakhsh: Central
- Rural District: Damen

Population (2006)
  - Total: 1,018
- Time zone: UTC+3:30 (IRST)
  - Summer (DST): UTC+4:30 (IRDT)

Qaleh-ye Tarvan (Persian: قلعه تاروان, also Romanized as Qal‘eh-ye Tarvān; also known as Qal‘eh-ye Tanrān, Qal‘eh-ye Tarān, and Tārvān) is a village in Damen Rural District, in the Central District of Iranshahr County, Sistan and Baluchestan Province, Iran. At the 2006 census, its population was 1,018, in 189 families.
