= Darchahi =

Darchahi درچاهي
- Village
- Location within Iran
- Coordinates: 27°59′58″N 60°09′08″E
- Country: Iran
- Province: Sistan and Baluchestan
- County: Iranshahr
- Bakhsh: Bazman
- Rural District: Bazman

Population (2006)
  - Total: 49
- Time zone: UTC+3:30 (IRST)
  - Summer (DST): UTC+4:30 (IRDT)

Darchahi (Persian: درچاهي, also Romanized as Darchāhī) is a village in Bazman Rural District, Bazman District, Iranshahr County, Sistan and Baluchestan Province, Iran. At the 2006 census, its population was 49, in 11 families.
