= Towhidabad, Mirjaveh =

Village in Sistan and Baluchestan province, Iran

Towhidabad Persian: توحيدآباد
- Village
- Country: Iran
- Province: Sistan and Baluchestan
- County: Mirjaveh
- District: Ladiz
- Rural District: Junabad

Population (2016)
  - Total: 473
- Time zone: UTC+3:30 (IRST)

Towhidabad (Persian: توحيدآباد) is a village in Junabad Rural District of Ladiz District, Mirjaveh County, Sistan and Baluchestan province, Iran.

== Demographics ==
=== Population ===
At the time of the 2006 National Census, the village's population was 425 in 95 households, when it was in Ladiz Rural District of the former Mirjaveh District of Zahedan County. The following census in 2011 counted 334 people in 93 households. The 2016 census measured the population of the village as 473 people in 128 households, by which time the district had been separated from the county in the establishment of Mirjaveh County. The rural district was transferred to the new Ladiz District, and Towhidabad was transferred to Junabad Rural District created in the district. Towhidabad was the most populous village in its rural district.
