= Baghdaniyeh =

Baghdaniyeh بغدانيه
- Village
- Location within Iran
- Coordinates: 27°10′48″N 60°42′32″E
- Country: Iran
- Province: Sistan and Baluchestan
- County: Iranshahr
- Bakhsh: Central
- Rural District: Howmeh

Population (2006)
  - Total: 817
- Time zone: UTC+3:30 (IRST)
  - Summer (DST): UTC+4:30 (IRDT)

Baghdaniyeh (Persian: بغدانيه, also Romanized as Baghdānīyeh; also known as Baghdānī) is a village in Howmeh Rural District, in the Central District of Iranshahr County, Sistan and Baluchestan Province, Iran. At the 2006 census, its population was 817, in 165 families.
