= Pansareh =

Pansareh پنساره
- Village
- Location within Iran
- Coordinates: 28°02′00″N 60°10′41″E
- Country: Iran
- Province: Sistan and Baluchestan
- County: Iranshahr
- Bakhsh: Bazman
- Rural District: Bazman

Population (2006)
  - Total: 50
- Time zone: UTC+3:30 (IRST)
  - Summer (DST): UTC+4:30 (IRDT)

Pansareh (Persian: پنساره, also Romanized as Pānsāreh) is a village in Bazman Rural District, Bazman District, Iranshahr County, Sistan and Baluchestan Province, Iran. At the 2006 census, its population was 50, in 12 families.
