= Bazmahi =

Bazmahi بزماهي
- Village
- Country: Iran
- Province: Sistan and Baluchestan
- County: Iranshahr
- Bakhsh: Central
- Rural District: Abtar

Population (2006)
  - Total: 50
- Time zone: UTC+3:30 (IRST)
  - Summer (DST): UTC+4:30 (IRDT)

Bazmahi (Persian: بزماهي, also Romanized as Bazmāhī) is a village in Abtar Rural District, in the Central District of Iranshahr County, Sistan and Baluchestan Province, Iran. At the 2006 census, its population was 50, in 9 families.
