= Tireh-ye Kheyrabad =

Tireh-ye Kheyrabad تيره خيراباد
- Village
- Interactive map of Tireh-ye Kheyrabad
- Country: Iran
- Province: Sistan and Baluchestan
- County: Iranshahr
- Bakhsh: Bazman
- Rural District: Bazman

Population (2006)
  - Total: 157
- Time zone: UTC+3:30 (IRST)
  - Summer (DST): UTC+4:30 (IRDT)

Tireh-ye Kheyrabad (Persian: تيره خيراباد, also Romanized as Tīreh-ye Kheyrābād) is a village in Bazman Rural District, Bazman District, Iranshahr County, Sistan and Baluchestan Province, Iran. At the 2006 census, its population was 157, in 32 families.
