= Detk, Iran =

Detk دتك
- Village
- Location within Iran
- Coordinates: 27°23′35″N 60°53′09″E
- Country: Iran
- Province: Sistan and Baluchestan
- County: Iranshahr
- Bakhsh: Central
- Rural District: Damen

Population (2006)
  - Total: 34
- Time zone: UTC+3:30 (IRST)
  - Summer (DST): UTC+4:30 (IRDT)

Detk (Persian: دتك; also known as Dedg and Dedk) is a village in Damen Rural District, in the Central District of Iranshahr County, Sistan and Baluchestan Province, Iran. At the 2006 census, its population was 34, in 7 families.
