= Gunkan =

Gunkan گونكن
- Village
- Location within Iran
- Coordinates: 26°54′09″N 61°07′44″E
- Country: Iran
- Province: Sistan and Baluchestan
- County: Iranshahr
- Bakhsh: Central
- Rural District: Abtar

Population (2006)
  - Total: 116
- Time zone: UTC+3:30 (IRST)
  - Summer (DST): UTC+4:30 (IRDT)

Gunkan (Persian: گونكن, also Romanized as Gūnkan; also known as Gūngan) is a village in Abtar Rural District, in the Central District of Iranshahr County, Sistan and Baluchestan Province, Iran. At the 2006 census, its population was 116, in 22 families.
