= Sayegan =

Sayegan سايگان
- Village
- Location within Iran
- Coordinates: 27°26′12″N 60°51′41″E
- Country: Iran
- Province: Sistan and Baluchestan
- County: Iranshahr
- Bakhsh: Central
- Rural District: Damen

Population (2006)
  - Total: 278
- Time zone: UTC+3:30 (IRST)
  - Summer (DST): UTC+4:30 (IRDT)

Sayegan (Persian: سايگان, also Romanized as Sāyegān; also known as Sāyehgān and Sīāh Gāh) is a village in Damen Rural District, in the Central District of Iranshahr County, Sistan and Baluchestan Province, Iran. At the 2006 census, its population was 278, in 59 families.
