= Baluchkan =

Baluchan بلوچان
- Village
- Location within Iran
- Coordinates: 27°30′01″N 60°48′04″E
- Country: Iran
- Province: Sistan and Baluchestan
- County: Iranshahr
- Bakhsh: Central
- Rural District: Damen

Population (2006)
  - Total: 407
- Time zone: UTC+3:30 (IRST)
  - Summer (DST): UTC+4:30 (IRDT)

Baluchan (Persian: بلوچان, also Romanized as Balūchān) is a village in Damen Rural District, in the Central District of Iranshahr County, Sistan and Baluchestan Province, Iran. At the 2006 census, its population was 407, in 52 families.
