= Vashapi =

Vashapi وش اپي
- Village
- Location within Iran
- Coordinates: 27°12′57″N 61°12′01″E
- Country: Iran
- Province: Sistan and Baluchestan
- County: Iranshahr
- Bakhsh: Central
- Rural District: Abtar

Population (2006)
  - Total: 72
- Time zone: UTC+3:30 (IRST)
  - Summer (DST): UTC+4:30 (IRDT)

Vashapi (Persian: وش اپي, also Romanized as Vashāpī; also known as Vashāfī) is a village in Abtar Rural District, in the Central District of Iranshahr County, Sistan and Baluchestan Province, Iran. At the 2006 census, its population was 72, in 17 families.
