= Junabad, Sistan and Baluchestan =

Village in Sistan and Baluchestan province, Iran

Junabad Persian: جون اباد
- Village
- Location within Iran
- Coordinates: 28°56′55″N 60°58′50″E
- Country: Iran
- Province: Sistan and Baluchestan
- County: Mirjaveh
- District: Ladiz
- Rural District: Junabad

Population (2016)
  - Total: 297
- Time zone: UTC+3:30 (IRST)

Junabad (Persian: جون اباد) is a village in, and the capital of, Junabad Rural District of Ladiz District, Mirjaveh County, Sistan and Baluchestan province, Iran.

== Demographics ==
=== Population ===
At the time of the 2006 National Census, the village's population was 312 in 60 households, when it was in Ladiz Rural District of the former Mirjaveh District of Zahedan County. The following census in 2011 counted 347 people in 66 households. The 2016 census measured the population of the village as 297 people in 76 households, by which time the district had been separated from the county in the establishment of Mirjaveh County. The rural district was transferred to the new Ladiz District, and Junabad was transferred to Junabad Rural District created in the district.
