= Dar Giaban, Iranshahr =

Dar Giaban درگيابان
- Village
- Country: Iran
- Province: Sistan and Baluchestan
- County: Iranshahr
- Bakhsh: Bazman
- Rural District: Bazman

Population (2006)
  - Total: 48
- Time zone: UTC+3:30 (IRST)
  - Summer (DST): UTC+4:30 (IRDT)

Dar Giaban (Persian: درگيابان, also Romanized as Dar Gīābān) is a village in Bazman Rural District, Bazman District, Iranshahr County, Sistan and Baluchestan Province, Iran. As of the 2006 census, its population was 48, in 9 families.
