= Tang-e Rahin =

Tang-e Rahin تنگ راهين
- Village
- Country: Iran
- Province: Sistan and Baluchestan
- County: Iranshahr
- Bakhsh: Bazman
- Rural District: Bazman

Population (2006)
  - Total: 81
- Time zone: UTC+3:30 (IRST)
  - Summer (DST): UTC+4:30 (IRDT)

Tang-e Rahin (Persian: تنگ راهين, also Romanized as Tang-e Rāhīn) is a village in Bazman Rural District, Bazman District, Iranshahr County, Sistan and Baluchestan Province, Iran. According to the 2006 census, its population was 81 with 12 families.
