= Kaliri, Iranshahr =

Kaliri كليري
- Village
- Interactive map of Kaliri
- Coordinates: 27.13°N 60.9718°E
- Country: Iran
- Province: Sistan and Baluchestan
- County: Iranshahr
- Bakhsh: Central
- Rural District: Abtar

Population (2006)
  - Total: 402
- Time zone: UTC+3:30 (IRST)
  - Summer (DST): UTC+4:30 (IRDT)

Kaliri (Persian: كليري, also Romanized as Kalīrī) is a village in Abtar Rural District, in the Central District of Iranshahr County, Sistan and Baluchestan Province, Iran. At the 2006 census, its population was 402, in 85 families.
