= Darreh-ye Seyeh Tapi =

Darreh-ye Seyeh Tapi دره سيه طپي
- Village
- Interactive map of Darreh-ye Seyeh Tapi
- Country: Iran
- Province: Sistan and Baluchestan
- County: Iranshahr
- Bakhsh: Central
- Rural District: Damen

Population (2006)
  - Total: 88
- Time zone: UTC+3:30 (IRST)
  - Summer (DST): UTC+4:30 (IRDT)

Darreh-ye Seyeh Tapi (Persian: دره سيه طپي, also Romanized as Darreh-ye Seyeh Ţapī) is a village in Damen Rural District, in the Central District of Iranshahr County, Sistan and Baluchestan Province, Iran. At the 2006 census, its population was 88, in 16 families.
