= Deh-e Jehil =

Deh-e Jehil ده جهيل
- Village
- Location within Iran
- Coordinates: 28°25′00″N 60°03′00″E
- Country: Iran
- Province: Sistan and Baluchestan
- County: Iranshahr
- Bakhsh: Bazman
- Rural District: Abreis

Population (2006)
  - Total: 68
- Time zone: UTC+3:30 (IRST)
  - Summer (DST): UTC+4:30 (IRDT)

Deh-e Jehil (Persian: ده جهيل, also Romanized as Deh-e Jehīl; also known as Deh-e Jīhel) is a village in Abreis Rural District, Bazman District, Iranshahr County, Sistan and Baluchestan Province, Iran. At the 2006 census, its population was 68, in 14 families.
