= Narazad =

Narazad نرازاد
- Village
- Location within Iran
- Coordinates: 27°55′09″N 59°45′09″E
- Country: Iran
- Province: Sistan and Baluchestan
- County: Iranshahr
- Bakhsh: Bazman
- Rural District: Bazman

Population (2006)
  - Total: 54
- Time zone: UTC+3:30 (IRST)
  - Summer (DST): UTC+4:30 (IRDT)

Narazad (Persian: نرازاد, also Romanized as Narāzād) is a village in Bazman Rural District, Bazman District, Iranshahr County, Sistan and Baluchestan Province, Iran. At the 2006 census, its population was 54, in 10 families.
