= Kuh Khezr =

Kuh Khezr كوه خضر
- Village
- Country: Iran
- Province: Sistan and Baluchestan
- County: Iranshahr
- Bakhsh: Bazman
- Rural District: Bazman

Population (2006)
  - Total: 104
- Time zone: UTC+3:30 (IRST)
  - Summer (DST): UTC+4:30 (IRDT)

Kuh Khezr (Persian: كوه خضر, also Romanized as Kūh Kheẕr) is a village in Bazman Rural District, Bazman District, Iranshahr County, Sistan and Baluchestan Province, Iran. At the 2006 census, its population was 104, in 21 families.
