= Kallinag-e Hasankhani =

Kallinag-e Hasankhani كلينگ حسن خاني
- Village
- Location within Iran
- Coordinates: 27°10′55″N 60°38′36″E
- Country: Iran
- Province: Sistan and Baluchestan
- County: Iranshahr
- Bakhsh: Central
- Rural District: Howmeh

Population (2006)
  - Total: 1,930
- Time zone: UTC+3:30 (IRST)
  - Summer (DST): UTC+4:30 (IRDT)

Kallinag-e Hasankhani (Persian: كلينگ حسن خاني, also Romanized as Kallīnag-e Ḩasankhānī; also known as Kallīnak-e Ḩasankhānī) is a village in Howmeh Rural District, in the Central District of Iranshahr County, Sistan and Baluchestan Province, Iran. At the 2006 census, its population was 1,930, in 334 families.
