= Mohimabad =

Mohimabad مهيم اباد
- Village
- Location within Iran
- Coordinates: 28°27′54″N 60°02′51″E
- Country: Iran
- Province: Sistan and Baluchestan
- County: Iranshahr
- Bakhsh: Bazman
- Rural District: Abreis

Population (2006)
  - Total: 24
- Time zone: UTC+3:30 (IRST)
  - Summer (DST): UTC+4:30 (IRDT)

Mohimabad (Persian: مهيم اباد, also Romanized as Mohīmābād) is a village in Abreis Rural District, Bazman District, Iranshahr County, Sistan and Baluchestan Province, Iran. At the 2006 census, its population was 24, in 5 families.
