= Abadan, Sistan and Baluchestan =

Village in Sistan and Baluchestan province, Iran

Abadan Persian: ابادان
- Village
- Location within Iran
- Coordinates: 27°19′44″N 60°45′01″E
- Country: Iran
- Province: Sistan and Baluchestan
- County: Iranshahr
- District: Damen
- Rural District: Abadan

Population (2016)
  - Total: 2,763
- Time zone: UTC+3:30 (IRST)

Abadan (Persian: ابادان) (Note: Also romanized as Ābādān) is a village in, and the capital of, Abadan Rural District of Damen District, Iranshahr County, Sistan and Baluchestan province, Iran.

== Demographics ==
=== Population ===
At the time of the 2006 National Census, the village's population was 2,233 in 440 households, when it was in Damen Rural District of the Central District. The following census in 2011 counted 2,229 people in 504 households. The 2016 census measured the population of the village as 2,763 people in 676 households. It was the most populous village in its rural district.

After the census, the rural district was separated from the district in the formation of Damen District, and Abadan was transferred to Abadan Rural District created in the new district.
