= Azmanabad =

Azmanabad ازمن اباد
- Village
- Location within Iran
- Coordinates: 27°15′06″N 60°56′20″E
- Country: Iran
- Province: Sistan and Baluchestan
- County: Iranshahr
- Bakhsh: Central
- Rural District: Abtar

Population (2006)
  - Total: 1,462
- Time zone: UTC+3:30 (IRST)
  - Summer (DST): UTC+4:30 (IRDT)

Azmanabad (Persian: ازمن اباد, also Romanized as Āzmanābād; also known as Ḩamzarābād) is a village in Abtar Rural District, in the Central District of Iranshahr County, Sistan and Baluchestan Province, Iran. At the 2006 census, its population was 1,462, in 248 families.
