= Marabad =

Marabad مراباد
- Village
- Location within Iran
- Coordinates: 27°24′46″N 60°50′19″E
- Country: Iran
- Province: Sistan and Baluchestan
- County: Iranshahr
- Bakhsh: Central
- Rural District: Damen

Population (2006)
  - Total: 349
- Time zone: UTC+3:30 (IRST)
  - Summer (DST): UTC+4:30 (IRDT)

Marabad (Persian: مراباد, also Romanized as Marābād) is a village in Damen Rural District, in the Central District of Iranshahr County, Sistan and Baluchestan Province, Iran. At the 2006 census, its population was 349, in 65 families.
