= Sar Kahuran =

Sar Kahuran سركهوران
- Village
- Location within Iran
- Coordinates: 27°09′48″N 60°46′00″E
- Country: Iran
- Province: Sistan and Baluchestan
- County: Iranshahr
- Bakhsh: Central
- Rural District: Howmeh

Population (2006)
  - Total: 931
- Time zone: UTC+3:30 (IRST)
  - Summer (DST): UTC+4:30 (IRDT)

Sar Kahuran (Persian: سركهوران, also Romanized as Sar Kahūrān and Sah Kahooran; also known as Kahūrā and Sar Kūhurān) is a village in Howmeh Rural District, in the Central District of Iranshahr County, Sistan and Baluchestan Province, Iran. At the 2006 census, its population was 931, in 184 families.
