= Kuhigan-e Bala =

Kuhigan-e Bala كوهيگان بالا
- Village
- Location within Iran
- Coordinates: 27°22′34″N 60°48′34″E
- Country: Iran
- Province: Sistan and Baluchestan
- County: Iranshahr
- Bakhsh: Central
- Rural District: Damen

Population (2006)
  - Total: 196
- Time zone: UTC+3:30 (IRST)
  - Summer (DST): UTC+4:30 (IRDT)

Kuhigan-e Bala (Persian: كوهيگان بالا, also Romanized as Kūhīgān-e Bālā; also known as Kūhegān, Kūhegān-e Bālā, and Kūhīkān) is a village in Damen Rural District, in the Central District of Iranshahr County, Sistan and Baluchestan Province, Iran. At the 2006 census, its population was 196, in 46 families.
