= Jan Mohammad, Iran =

Jan Mohammad جان محمد
- Village
- Country: Iran
- Province: Sistan and Baluchestan
- County: Mirjaveh
- Bakhsh: Central
- Rural District: Ladiz

Population (2006)
  - Total: 29
- Time zone: UTC+3:30 (IRST)
  - Summer (DST): UTC+4:30 (IRDT)

Jan Mohammad (Persian: جان محمد, also Romanized as Jān Moḩammad) is a village in Ladiz Rural District, in the Central District of Mirjaveh County, Sistan and Baluchestan Province, Iran. At the 2006 census, its population was 29, in 5 families.
