= Chahuk, Iranshahr =

Chahuk چاهوك
- Village
- Location within Iran
- Coordinates: 27°47′56″N 59°52′48″E
- Country: Iran
- Province: Sistan and Baluchestan
- County: Iranshahr
- Bakhsh: Bazman
- Rural District: Bazman

Population (2006)
  - Total: 42
- Time zone: UTC+3:30 (IRST)
  - Summer (DST): UTC+4:30 (IRDT)

Chahuk (Persian: چاهوك, also Romanized as Chāhūk) is a village in Bazman Rural District, Bazman District, Iranshahr County, Sistan and Baluchestan Province, Iran. At the 2006 census, its population was 42, in 6 families.
