= Abadan Rural District =

Rural district in Sistan and Baluchestan province, Iran

Abadan Rural District Persian: دهستان آبادان
- Rural District
- Location within Iran
- Coordinates: 27°22′56″N 60°43′19″E
- Country: Iran
- Province: Sistan and Baluchestan
- County: Iranshahr
- District: Damen
- Capital: Abadan
- Time zone: UTC+3:30 (IRST)

Abadan Rural District (Persian: دهستان آبادان) is in Damen District of Iranshahr County, Sistan and Baluchestan province, Iran. Its capital is the village of Abadan, whose population at the time of the 2016 National Census was 2,763 people in 676 households.

== History ==
After the 2016 census, Damen Rural District was separated from the Central District in the formation of Damen District, and Abadan Rural District was created in the new district.
