= Kuhigan =

Kuhigan (Persian: كوهيگان), also rendered as Kuhegan or Kuhikan, may refer to:

- Kuhigan-e Bala
- Kuhigan-e Pain
