= Masjed Abu ol Fazl, Sistan and Baluchestan =

Village in Sistan and Baluchestan province, Iran

Masjed Abu ol Fazl Persian: مسجدابوالفضل
- Village
- Location within Iran
- Coordinates: 28°19′28″N 59°33′07″E
- Country: Iran
- Province: Sistan and Baluchestan
- County: Iranshahr
- District: Bazman
- Rural District: Abreis

Population (2016)
  - Total: 258
- Time zone: UTC+3:30 (IRST)

Masjed Abu ol Fazl (Persian: مسجدابوالفضل) (Note: Also romanized as Masjed Abū ol Faẕl) is a village in, and the capital of, Abreis Rural District of Bazman District, Iranshahr County, Sistan and Baluchestan province, Iran.

== Demographics ==
=== Population ===
At the time of the 2006 National Census, the village's population was 320 in 68 households. The following census in 2011 counted 518 people in 119 households. The 2016 census measured the population of the village as 258 people in 69 households. It was the most populous village in its rural district.
