= Deh-e Parviz =

Deh-e Parviz (Persian: ده پرويز) may refer to:

- Deh-e Parviz, Hirmand
- Deh-e Parviz, Mirjaveh
