= Giman =

Giman (Persian: گيمان) may refer to:

- Giman, Iranshahr
- Giman, Sarbaz

== See also ==
- Gimån, a river in Sweden
