= Abtar, Sistan and Baluchestan =

Village in Sistan and Baluchestan province, Iran

Abtar Persian: ابتر
- Village
- Location within Iran
- Coordinates: 27°14′03″N 60°52′58″E
- Country: Iran
- Province: Sistan and Baluchestan
- County: Iranshahr
- District: Central
- Rural District: Abtar

Population (2016)
  - Total: 3,089
- Time zone: UTC+3:30 (IRST)

Abtar (Persian: ابتر) (Note: Also known as Aftar, Aptar, and Āytār) is a village in, and the capital of, Abtar Rural District of the Central District of Iranshahr County, Sistan and Baluchestan province, Iran.

== Demographics ==
=== Population ===
At the time of the 2006 National Census, the village's population was 2,272 in 451 households. The following census in 2011 counted 2,839 people in 704 households. The 2016 census measured the population of the village as 3,089 people in 919 households. It was the most populous village in its rural district.
