= Kuhigan-e Pain =

Kuhigan-e Pain كوهيگان پائين
- Village
- Location within Iran
- Coordinates: 27°22′10″N 60°48′18″E
- Country: Iran
- Province: Sistan and Baluchestan
- County: Iranshahr
- Bakhsh: Central
- Rural District: Damen

Population (2006)
  - Total: 265
- Time zone: UTC+3:30 (IRST)
  - Summer (DST): UTC+4:30 (IRDT)

Kuhigan-e Pain (Persian: كوهيگان پائين, also Romanized as Kūhīgān-e Pā’īn) is a village in Damen Rural District, in the Central District of Iranshahr County, Sistan and Baluchestan Province, Iran. At the 2006 census, its population was 265, in 50 families.
