= Pirkan =

Pirkan پيركان
- Village
- Country: Iran
- Province: Sistan and Baluchestan
- County: Mirjaveh
- Bakhsh: Central
- Rural District: Ladiz

Population (2006)
  - Total: 20
- Time zone: UTC+3:30 (IRST)
  - Summer (DST): UTC+4:30 (IRDT)

Pirkan (Persian: پيركان(پيركهن), also Romanized as Pīrkān; also known as Pīrkahn) is a village in Ladiz Rural District, in the Central District of Mirjaveh County, Sistan and Baluchestan Province, Iran. At the 2006 census, its population was 20, in 5 families.
