= Darreh Kashkin =

Darreh Kashkin دره كشكين
- Village
- Location within Iran
- Coordinates: 27°46′17″N 59°53′05″E
- Country: Iran
- Province: Sistan and Baluchestan
- County: Iranshahr
- Bakhsh: Bazman
- Rural District: Bazman

Population (2006)
  - Total: 76
- Time zone: UTC+3:30 (IRST)
  - Summer (DST): UTC+4:30 (IRDT)

Darreh Kashkin (Persian: دره كشكين, also Romanized as Darreh Kashkīn) is a village in Bazman Rural District, Bazman District, Iranshahr County, Sistan and Baluchestan Province, Iran. At the 2006 census, its population was 76, in 16 families.
