= Tang-e Nadam =

Tang-e Nadam تنگ ندام
- Village
- Location within Iran
- Coordinates: 29°14′06″N 60°55′22″E
- Country: Iran
- Province: Sistan and Baluchestan
- County: Mirjaveh
- Bakhsh: Central
- Rural District: Ladiz

Population (2006)
  - Total: 69
- Time zone: UTC+3:30 (IRST)
  - Summer (DST): UTC+4:30 (IRDT)

Tang-e Nadam (Persian: تنگ ندام, also Romanized as Tang-e Nadām; also known as Tangeh Nadām) is a village in Ladiz Rural District, in the Central District of Mirjaveh County, Sistan and Baluchestan Province, Iran. At the 2006 census, its population was 69, in 17 families.
