= Rig-e Malek =

City in Sistan and Baluchestan province, Iran

Rig-e Malek Persian: ریگ ملک
- City
- Location within Iran
- Coordinates: 28°45′16″N 61°41′48″E
- Country: Iran
- Province: Sistan and Baluchestan
- County: Mirjaveh
- District: Rig-e Malek

Population (2016)
  - Total: 1,688
- Time zone: UTC+3:30 (IRST)

Rig-e Malek (Persian: ریگ ملک) (Note: Formerly Shahrak-e Rig-e Malek (شهرک ريگ ملک)) is a city in, and the capital of, Rig-e Malek District of Mirjaveh County, Sistan and Baluchestan province, Iran, and also serves as the administrative center for Rig-e Malek Rural District.

== Demographics ==
=== Population ===
At the time of the 2006 National Census, Rig-e Malek's population was 1,690 in 277 households, when it was a village in Ladiz Rural District of the former Mirjaveh District of Zahedan County. The following census in 2011 counted 1,497 people in 313 households. The 2016 census measured the population of the village as 1,688 people in 410 households, by which time the district had been separated from the county in the establishment of Mirjaveh County. The rural district was transferred to the new Ladiz District, and Rig-e Malek was transferred to Rig-e Malek Rural District created in the new Rig-e Malek District. It was the most populous village in its rural district.

After the census, the village was elevated to the status of a city.
