= Gigan, Iran =

Gigan (Persian: گيگن or گيگان) in Iran may refer to:

- Gigan, Hormozgan (گيگن - Gīgan)
- Gigan, Sistan and Baluchestan (گيگان - Gīgān)
