= Burta =

Burta بورتا
- Village
- Country: Iran
- Province: Sistan and Baluchestan
- County: Mirjaveh
- Bakhsh: Central
- Rural District: Tamin

Population (2006)
  - Total: 132
- Time zone: UTC+3:30 (IRST)
  - Summer (DST): UTC+4:30 (IRDT)

Burta (Persian: بورتا, also Romanized as Būrtā) is a village in Tamin Rural District, in the Central District of Mirjaveh County, Sistan and Baluchestan province, Iran. At the 2006 census, its population was 132, in 23 families.
