= Lulakdan =

Village in Sistan and Baluchestan province, Iran

Lulakdan Persian: لولکدان
- Village
- Location within Iran
- Coordinates: 28°29′29″N 61°57′55″E
- Country: Iran
- Province: Sistan and Baluchestan
- County: Mirjaveh
- District: Rig-e Malek
- Rural District: Tahlab

Population (2016)
  - Total: 678
- Time zone: UTC+3:30 (IRST)

Lulakdan (Persian: لولكدان) (Note: Also romanized as Lūlakdān) is a village in Tahlab Rural District of Rig-e Malek District, Mirjaveh County, Sistan and Baluchestan province, Iran.

== Demographics ==
=== Population ===
At the time of the 2006 National Census, the village's population was 453 in 97 households, when it was in Poshtkuh Rural District of the Central District of Khash County. The following census in 2011 counted 656 people in 146 households. The 2016 census measured the population of the village as 678 people in 204 households, by which time the village had been separated from the county in the establishment of Mirjaveh County. Lulakdan was transferred to Tahlab Rural District created in the new Rig-e Malek District. It was the most populous village in its rural district.
