= Shahr Deraz =

Shahr Deraz or Shahrdaraz or Shahr-e Deraz (Persian: شهردراز) may refer to:

- Shahr Deraz, Iranshahr
- Shahr-e Deraz, Khash
- Shahr-e Deraz, Mirjaveh
