= Chahuk-e Mehrab =

Chahuk-e Mehrab چاهوك محراب
- Village
- Country: Iran
- Province: Sistan and Baluchestan
- County: Iranshahr
- Bakhsh: Bazman
- Rural District: Bazman

Population (2006)
  - Total: 33
- Time zone: UTC+3:30 (IRST)
  - Summer (DST): UTC+4:30 (IRDT)

Chahuk-e Mehrab (Persian: چاهوك محراب, also Romanized as Chāhūk-e Meḩrāb) is a small village in Bazman Rural District, Bazman District, Iranshahr County, Sistan and Baluchestan Province, Iran. As of the 2006 Census of the Islamic Republic of Iran, the village's population was 33 and contained 9 families.
