= Chah-e Jamal =

Village in Sistan and Baluchestan province, Iran

Chah-e Jamal Persian: چاه جمال
- Village
- Location within Iran
- Coordinates: 27°14′24″N 60°41′38″E
- Country: Iran
- Province: Sistan and Baluchestan
- County: Iranshahr
- District: Central
- Rural District: Howmeh

Population (2016)
  - Total: 8,144
- Time zone: UTC+3:30 (IRST)

Chah-e Jamal (Persian: چاه جمال) is a village in Howmeh Rural District of the Central District of Iranshahr County, Sistan and Baluchestan province, Iran.

== Demographics ==
=== Population ===
At the time of the 2006 National Census, the village's population was 2,568 in 476 households. The following census in 2011 counted 5,018 people in 1,126 households. The 2016 census measured the population of the village as 8,144 people in 1,827 households. It was the most populous village in its rural district.
