= Tanhak =

Tanhak تنهك
- Village
- Location within Iran
- Coordinates: 27°37′00″N 59°53′37″E
- Country: Iran
- Province: Sistan and Baluchestan
- County: Iranshahr
- Bakhsh: Bazman
- Rural District: Bazman

Population (2006)
  - Total: 118
- Time zone: UTC+3:30 (IRST)
  - Summer (DST): UTC+4:30 (IRDT)

Tanhak (Persian: تنهك; also known as Tanahk, Tānakh, Tunak, and Tūtak) is a village in Bazman Rural District, Bazman District, Iranshahr County, Sistan and Baluchestan Province, Iran. At the 2006 census, its population was 118, in 25 families.
