= Zehlenfan =

Village in Sistan and Baluchestan province, Iran

Zehlenfan Persian: زهلنفان
- Village
- Location within Iran
- Coordinates: 27°24′53″N 60°49′16″E
- Country: Iran
- Province: Sistan and Baluchestan
- County: Iranshahr
- District: Damen
- Rural District: Damen

Population (2016)
  - Total: 521
- Time zone: UTC+3:30 (IRST)

Zehlenfan (Persian: زهلنفان) (Note: Also romanized as Zehlenfān; also known as Zehlenpān) is a village in, and the former capital of, Damen Rural District of Damen District, Iranshahr County, Sistan and Baluchestan province, Iran, serving as capital of the district. The capital of the rural district has been transferred to the village of Kuran-e Sofla.

== Demographics ==
=== Population ===
At the time of the 2006 National Census, the village's population was 511 in 85 households, when it was in the Central District. The following census in 2011 counted 484 people in 103 households. The 2016 census measured the population of the village as 521 people in 130 households.

After the census, the rural district was separated from the district in the formation of Damen District.
