= Palang Sar =

Palang Sar پلنگ سار
- Village
- Interactive map of Palang Sar
- Country: Iran
- Province: Sistan and Baluchestan
- County: Mirjaveh
- Bakhsh: Central
- Rural District: Tamin

Population (2006)
  - Total: 54
- Time zone: UTC+3:30 (IRST)
  - Summer (DST): UTC+4:30 (IRDT)

Palang Sar (Persian: پلنگ سار, also Romanized as Palang Sār) is a village in Tamin Rural District, in the Central District of Mirjaveh County, Sistan and Baluchestan Province, Iran. At the 2006 census, its population was 54, in 8 families.
