= Kasami, Iran =

Kasami كاسمي
- Village
- Location within Iran
- Coordinates: 26°57′30″N 61°12′45″E
- Country: Iran
- Province: Sistan and Baluchestan
- County: Iranshahr
- Bakhsh: Central
- Rural District: Abtar

Population (2006)
  - Total: 128
- Time zone: UTC+3:30 (IRST)
  - Summer (DST): UTC+4:30 (IRDT)

Kasami (Persian: كاسمي, also Romanized as Kāsamī) is a village in Abtar Rural District, in the Central District of Iranshahr County, Sistan and Baluchestan Province, Iran. At the 2006 census, its population was 128, in 28 families.
