= Ladiz-e Sofla =

Village in Sistan and Baluchestan province, Iran

Ladiz-e Sofla Persian: لاديز سفلي
- Village
- Location within Iran
- Coordinates: 28°55′44″N 61°18′25″E
- Country: Iran
- Province: Sistan and Baluchestan
- County: Mirjaveh
- District: Ladiz
- Rural District: Ladiz

Population (2016)
  - Total: 154
- Time zone: UTC+3:30 (IRST)

Ladiz-e Sofla (Persian: لاديز سفلي) is a village in Ladiz Rural District of Ladiz District, Mirjaveh County, Sistan and Baluchestan province, Iran, serving as capital of both the district and the rural district.

== Demographics ==
=== Population ===
At the time of the 2006 National Census, the village's population was 141 in 22 households, when it was in the former Mirjaveh District of Zahedan County. The following census in 2011 counted 120 people in 32 households. The 2016 census measured the population of the village as 154 people in 43 households, by which time the district had been separated from the county in the establishment of Mirjaveh County. The rural district was transferred to the new Ladiz District.
