= Sheyban, Iran (disambiguation) =

Sheyban, Iran is a city in Khuzestan Province, Iran.

Sheyban (Persian: شيبان) may also refer to:

- Sheyban, Sistan and Baluchestan
- Sheyban, West Azerbaijan
