= Mulla Kamal Salahzahi =

- Mulla Kamal Salahzehi in Sarbaz, October 2025
- Born: Kamal Salahzehi; Gurnag, Sarbaz County, Sistan and Baluchestan Province, Iran
- Died: October 19, 2025; Iranshahr, Iran
- Cause of death: Martyred in targeted assassination
- Other name: Father of Peace in Balochistan
- Occupations: Tribal elder, activist
- Known for: Tribal mediation, peace advocacy

Haji Mulla Kamal Khan Salahzahi Baloch (Balochi: واجہ ملا کمال ھان سلاھزھی بلۏچ; died died 19 October 2025) was a Baloch tribal chieftain, peace activist and community mediator from Iranian Balochistan. He was widely known for his efforts in promoting reconciliation among Baloch tribes and for his outspoken criticism of the Islamic Republic of Iran.

== Early life ==
Mulla Kamal was born in the village of Gurnag in Sarbaz County, located in Sistan and Baluchestan Province, Iran. He became widely known for his role in resolving tribal disputes and fostering unity among Baloch communities, especially in southeastern Iran. His efforts in promoting peace and reconciliation earned him the title "Father of Peace in Balochistan" among many Baloch activists.

== Peace advocacy ==
Throughout his life, Mulla Kamal worked to mediate conflicts and encourage peaceful dialogue among Baloch tribes. He was active in tribal affairs in Iranshahr (also known as Pahra), and his influence extended across southeastern Iran. According to the Balochistan Human Rights Group, he was recognized as a key figure in promoting peace and tribal unity.

== Assassination ==
On 19 October 2025, Mulla Kamal was assassinated by unidentified gunmen while traveling with his son and driver near the Defa-e-Moghaddas roundabout in Iranshahr. He was killed instantly, while his son sustained serious injuries. The attack was widely condemned by Baloch activists and human rights organizations, who described him as a martyr for peace. According to Halvash News, Salahzehi was a prominent figure from the Salahzehi tribe and had previously opposed the Iranian government during the 1980s and 1990s. He later accepted a government amnesty program and returned to civilian life for over a decade. Sources close to him believe the assassination may have been politically motivated, aimed at eliminating his social influence after years of tribal leadership.

== Legacy ==
Following his death, many Baloch activists and civil society groups referred to Mulla Kamal as a martyr and a symbol of peaceful resistance. His assassination sparked widespread mourning across Balochistan and renewed calls for justice and tribal unity. The Karoon Human Rights Organization also documented his case as part of broader patterns of suppression in the region.

== See also ==
- Baloch people
- Sarbaz County
- Iranshahr
- Baloch nationalism
