= Kasami =

Kasami may refer to:

- Kasami, Iran, a village in Sistan and Baluchestan Province, Iran
- Pajtim Kasami, a Swiss footballer
- Tadao Kasami, a Japanese information theorist

- Kasami code, a line code associated with him
