= Andeh Rural District =

Rural district in Sistan and Baluchestan province, Iran

Andeh Rural District Persian: دهستان انده
- Rural District
- Location within Iran
- Coordinates: 28°45′40″N 61°26′22″E
- Country: Iran
- Province: Sistan and Baluchestan
- County: Mirjaveh
- District: Central
- Capital: Andeh

Population (2016)
  - Total: 3,265
- Time zone: UTC+3:30 (IRST)

Andeh Rural District (Persian: دهستان انده) is in the Central District of Mirjaveh County, Sistan and Baluchestan province, Iran. Its capital is the village of Andeh.

== History ==
After the 2011 National Census, Mirjaveh District was separated from Zahedan County in the establishment of Mirjaveh County, and Andeh Rural District was created in the new Central District.

== Demographics ==
=== Population ===
At the time of the 2016 census, the rural district's population was 3,265 in 802 households. The most populous of its 18 villages was Fathabad, with 435 people.
