= Madhan, Iran =

Madhan may refer to the following places in Iran:

- Madhan, Iranshahr (مدهان 'Madhān')
- Madhan, Nik Shahr (مدحان 'Madḩān'), in Sistan and Baluchestan Province
