= Shahrak-e Shahid Kallah Duz =

Shahrak-e Shahid Kallah Duz شهرك شهيدكلاه دوز
- Village
- Country: Iran
- Province: Sistan and Baluchestan
- County: Bampur
- Bakhsh: Central
- Rural District: Bampur-e Sharqi

Population (2006)
  - Total: 625
- Time zone: UTC+3:30 (IRST)
  - Summer (DST): UTC+4:30 (IRDT)

Shahrak-e Shahid Kallah Duz (Persian: شهرك شهيدكلاه دوز, also Romanized as Shahrak-e Shahīd Kallāh Dūz) is a village in Bampur-e Sharqi Rural District, in the Central District of Bampur County, Sistan and Baluchestan Province, Iran. At the 2006 census, its population was 625, in 133 families.
