= Espidezh Castle =

Castle in Sistan and Baluchestan Province, Iran

Espidezh castle
- قلعه اسپیدژ

General information
- Type: Castle
- Location: Iranshahr County, Iran

Espidezh castle (Persian: قلعه اسپیدژ) is a historical castle located in Iranshahr County in Sistan and Baluchestan Province, The longevity of this fortress dates back to the Early centuries of historical periods after Islam.
