= Kashkin =

Kashkin may refer to

- Darreh Kashkin, a village in Iran
- Nikolay Kashkin (1839–1920), Russian music critic
- Ivan Kashkin (1899–1963), Russian-Soviet translator of English literature
