= Estakhrak =

Estakhrak (Persian: استخرك) may refer to:

- Estakhrak, Sistan and Baluchestan
- Estakhrak, South Khorasan
