= Tahlab Rural District =

Rural district in Sistan and Baluchestan province, Iran

Tahlab Rural District Persian: دهستان تهلاب
- Rural District
- Location within Iran
- Coordinates: 28°34′22″N 61°47′27″E
- Country: Iran
- Province: Sistan and Baluchestan
- County: Mirjaveh
- District: Rig-e Malek
- Capital: Mowtowr-e Gami

Population (2016)
  - Total: 2,018
- Time zone: UTC+3:30 (IRST)

Tahlab Rural District (Persian: دهستان تهلاب) is in Rig-e Malek District of Mirjaveh County, Sistan and Baluchestan province, Iran. Its capital is the village of Mowtowr-e Gami.

== History ==
After the 2011 National Census, Mirjaveh District was separated from Zahedan County in the establishment of Mirjaveh County, and Tahlab Rural District was created in the new Rig-e Malek District.

== Demographics ==
=== Population ===
At the time of the 2016 census, the rural district's population was 2,018 in 573 households. The most populous of its 57 villages was Lulakdan, with 678 people.
