= Shahr Deraz, Iranshahr =

Village in Sistan and Baluchestan province, Iran

Shahr Deraz Persian: شهردراز
- Village
- Location within Iran
- Coordinates: 27°11′09″N 60°43′21″E
- Country: Iran
- Province: Sistan and Baluchestan
- County: Iranshahr
- District: Central
- Rural District: Howmeh

Population (2016)
  - Total: 4,618
- Time zone: UTC+3:30 (IRST)

Shahr Deraz (Persian: شهردراز) (Note: Also romanized as Shahr Derāz and Shahrdarāz; also known as Shāh Derāz and Shahderāz) is a village in, and the capital of, Howmeh Rural District of the Central District of Iranshahr County, Sistan and Baluchestan province, Iran.

== Demographics ==
=== Population ===
At the time of the 2006 National Census, the village's population was 3,101 in 654 households. The following census in 2011 counted 3,701 people in 917 households. The 2016 census measured the population of the village as 4,618 people in 1,189 households.
