= Tunak =

Tunak may refer to:

- "Tunak Tunak Tun" or "Tunak Tunak", a 1998 bhangra song by Indian singer Daler Mehndi
- Tunak, Iran, a village in South-Eastern Iran
