= Chakorabad =

Chakorabad چكراباد
- Village
- Location within Iran
- Coordinates: 27°11′14″N 60°31′06″E
- Country: Iran
- Province: Sistan and Baluchestan
- County: Bampur
- Bakhsh: Central
- Rural District: Bampur-e Sharqi

Population (2006)
  - Total: 235
- Time zone: UTC+3:30 (IRST)
  - Summer (DST): UTC+4:30 (IRDT)

Chakorabad (Persian: چكراباد, also Romanized as Chakorābād; also known as Chagorābād) is a village in Bampur-e Sharqi Rural District, in the Central District of Bampur County, Sistan and Baluchestan Province, Iran. At the 2006 census, its population was 235, in 40 families.
