= Manesh =

Manesh may refer to:

- Marshall Manesh (b. 1950), American actor
- Manesh, Iran, a village in Sistan and Baluchestan Province, Iran
- Manesh, North Khorasan, a village in North Khorasan Province, Iran
