= Baz Piran =

Baz Piran بزپيران
- Village
- Location within Iran
- Coordinates: 26°57′00″N 60°33′59″E
- Country: Iran
- Province: Sistan and Baluchestan
- County: Bampur
- Bakhsh: Central
- Rural District: Bampur-e Sharqi

Population (2006)
  - Total: 1,179
- Time zone: UTC+3:30 (IRST)
  - Summer (DST): UTC+4:30 (IRDT)

Baz Piran (Persian: بزپيران, also Romanized as Baz Pīrān) is a village in Bampur-e Sharqi Rural District, in the Central District of Bampur County, Sistan and Baluchestan Province, Iran. At the 2006 census, its population was 1,179, in 249 families.
