= Shahr-e Deraz, Mirjaveh =

Shahr-e Deraz شهردراز
- Village
- Location within Iran
- Coordinates: 28°58′00″N 60°56′00″E
- Country: Iran
- Province: Sistan and Baluchestan
- County: Mirjaveh
- Bakhsh: Central
- Rural District: Ladiz

Population (2006)
  - Total: 112
- Time zone: UTC+3:30 (IRST)
  - Summer (DST): UTC+4:30 (IRDT)

Shahr-e Deraz (Persian: شهردراز, also Romanized as Shahr-e Derāz; also known as Chāh-e Derāz and Chāh-i-Darāz) is a village in Ladiz Rural District, in the Central District of Mirjaveh County, Sistan and Baluchestan Province, Iran. At the 2006 census, its population was 112, in 25 families.
