= Junabad Rural District =

Rural district in Sistan and Baluchestan province, Iran

Junabad Rural District Persian: دهستان جون‌آباد
- Rural District
- Location within Iran
- Coordinates: 28°54′34″N 60°55′37″E
- Country: Iran
- Province: Sistan and Baluchestan
- County: Mirjaveh
- District: Ladiz
- Capital: Junabad

Population (2016)
  - Total: 6,455
- Time zone: UTC+3:30 (IRST)

Junabad Rural District (Persian: دهستان جون‌آباد) is in Ladiz District of Mirjaveh County, Sistan and Baluchestan province, Iran. Its capital is the village of Junabad.

== History ==
After the 2011 National Census, Mirjaveh District was separated from Zahedan County in the establishment of Mirjaveh County, and Junabad Rural District was created in the new Ladiz District.

== Demographics ==
=== Population ===
At the time of the 2016 census, the rural district's population was 6,455 in 1,750 households. The most populous of its 95 villages was Towhidabad, with 473 people.
