= Rig-e Malek Rural District =

Rural district in Sistan and Baluchestan province, Iran

Rig-e Malek Rural District Persian: دهستان ریگ ملک
- Rural District
- Location within Iran
- Coordinates: 28°45′58″N 61°37′33″E
- Country: Iran
- Province: Sistan and Baluchestan
- County: Mirjaveh
- District: Rig-e Malek
- Capital: Rig-e Malek

Population (2016)
  - Total: 7,184
- Time zone: UTC+3:30 (IRST)

Rig-e Malek Rural District (Persian: دهستان ریگ ملک) is in Rig-e Malek District of Mirjaveh County, Sistan and Baluchestan province, Iran. It is administered from the city of Rig-e Malek.

== History ==
After the 2011 National Census, Mirjaveh District was separated from Zahedan County in the establishment of Mirjaveh County, and Rig-e Malek Rural District was created in the new Rig-e Malek District.

== Demographics ==
=== Population ===
At the time of the 2016 census, the rural district's population was 7,184 people in 1,747 households. The most populous of its 55 villages was Rig-e Malek (now a city), with 1,688 people.
