= Howmeh Rural District (Mirjaveh County) =

Rural district in Sistan and Baluchestan province, Iran

Howmeh Rural District Persian: دهستان حومه
- Rural District
- Location within Iran
- Coordinates: 29°11′42″N 61°20′16″E
- Country: Iran
- Province: Sistan and Baluchestan
- County: Mirjaveh
- District: Central
- Capital: Shahrak-e Mil-e 72

Population (2016)
  - Total: 571
- Time zone: UTC+3:30 (IRST)

Howmeh Rural District (Persian: دهستان حومه) is in the Central District of Mirjaveh County, Sistan and Baluchestan province, Iran. Its capital is the village of Shahrak-e Mil-e 72.

== History ==
After the 2011 National Census, Mirjaveh District was separated from Zahedan County in the establishment of Mirjaveh County, and Howmeh Rural District was created in the new Central District.

== Demographics ==
=== Population ===
At the time of the 2016 census, the rural district's population was 571 in 153 households. The most populous of its 65 villages was Kar Gazi, with 132 people.
