= Nukjub =

Village in Sistan and Baluchestan province, Iran

Nukjub Persian: نوكجوب
- Village
- Location within Iran
- Coordinates: 27°11′23″N 60°30′35″E
- Country: Iran
- Province: Sistan and Baluchestan
- County: Bampur
- District: Central
- Rural District: Bampur-e Sharqi

Population (2016)
  - Total: 2,561
- Time zone: UTC+3:30 (IRST)

Nukjub (Persian: نوكجوب) (Note: Also romanized as Nūkjūb; also known as Nokjū, Nook Joo, Nowk Janūb, and Nūkchū) is a village in, and the capital of, Bampur-e Sharqi Rural District of the Central District of Bampur County, Sistan and Baluchestan province, Iran.

== Demographics ==
=== Population ===
At the time of the 2006 National Census, the village's population was 2,043 in 434 households, when it was in the former Bampur District of Iranshahr County. The following census in 2011 counted 2,472 people in 603 households. The 2016 census measured the population of the village as 2,561 people in 679 households.

In 2017, the district was separated from the county in the establishment of Bampur County, and the rural district was transferred to the new Central District.
