= Rig-e Kaput =

Village in Sistan and Baluchestan province, Iran

Rig-e Kaput Persian: ريگ كپوت
- Village
- Location within Iran
- Coordinates: 27°12′21″N 60°30′51″E
- Country: Iran
- Province: Sistan and Baluchestan
- County: Bampur
- District: Central
- Rural District: Bampur-e Sharqi

Population (2016)
  - Total: 3,491
- Time zone: UTC+3:30 (IRST)

Rig-e Kaput (Persian: ريگ كپوت) (Note: Also romanized as Rīg-e Kapūt; also known as Rīg-e Kapūtī) is a village in Bampur-e Sharqi Rural District of the Central District of Bampur County, Sistan and Baluchestan province, Iran.

== Demographics ==
=== Population ===
At the time of the 2006 National Census, the village's population was 2,389 in 406 households, when it was in the former Bampur District of Iranshahr County. The following census in 2011 counted 3,423 people in 692 households. The 2016 census measured the population of the village as 3,491 people in 834 households. It was the most populous village in its rural district.

In 2017, the district was separated from the county in the establishment of Bampur County, and the rural district was transferred to the new Central District.
