= Iranshahr University of Medical Sciences =

University in Iranshahr, Iran

- دانشگاه علوم پزشکی و خدمات بهداشتی درمانی ایرانشهر
- Established: 1993
- Chancellor: Dr. Salehoddin Bouya
- Students: 800
- Location: Iranshahr, Iran
- Website: irshums.ac.ir

Iranshahr University of Medical Sciences is a medical sciences university in Iranshahr, Sistan and Baluchestan, Iran. The university has three school including medicine, medical emergency, and nursing & midwifery.
