= Giman, Iranshahr =

Village in Sistan and Baluchestan province, Iran

Giman Persian: گيمان
- Village
- Location within Iran
- Coordinates: 27°51′02″N 60°09′58″E
- Country: Iran
- Province: Sistan and Baluchestan
- County: Iranshahr
- District: Bazman
- Rural District: Bazman

Population (2016)
  - Total: 752
- Time zone: UTC+3:30 (IRST)

Giman (Persian: گيمان) (Note: Also romanized as Gīmān; also known as Kīmān) is a village in, and the capital of, Bazman Rural District of Bazman District, Iranshahr County, Sistan and Baluchestan province, Iran.

== Demographics ==
=== Population ===
At the time of the 2006 National Census, the village's population was 1,339 in 261 households. The following census in 2011 counted 724 people in 175 households. The 2016 census measured the population of the village as 752 people in 198 households. It was the most populous village in its rural district.
