= Machu Qasem =

Machu Qasem مچوقاسم
- Village
- Location within Iran
- Coordinates: 27°11′03″N 60°29′50″E
- Country: Iran
- Province: Sistan and Baluchestan
- County: Bampur
- Bakhsh: Central
- Rural District: Bampur-e Sharqi

Population (2006)
  - Total: 1,034
- Time zone: UTC+3:30 (IRST)
  - Summer (DST): UTC+4:30 (IRDT)

Machu Qasem (Persian: مچوقاسم, also Romanized as Machū Qāsem) is a village in Bampur-e Sharqi Rural District, in the Central District of Bampur County, Sistan and Baluchestan Province, Iran. At the 2006 census, its population was 1,034, in 212 families.
