= Bazman, Iran =

City in Sistan and Baluchestan province, Iran

Bazman Persian: بزمان
- City
- Location within Iran
- Coordinates: 27°51′01″N 60°10′27″E
- Country: Iran
- Province: Sistan and Baluchestan
- County: Iranshahr
- District: Bazman

Population (2016)
  - Total: 5,192
- Time zone: UTC+3:30 (IRST)

Bazman (Persian: بزمان) (Note: Also romanized as Bazmān) is a city in, and the capital of, Bazman District of Iranshahr County, Sistan and Baluchestan province, Iran.

== Demographics ==
=== Population ===
At the time of the 2006 National Census, the city's population was 4,002 in 816 households. The following census in 2011 counted 4,702 people in 1,071 households. The 2016 census measured the population of the city as 5,192 people in 1,355 households.
