= Gimån =

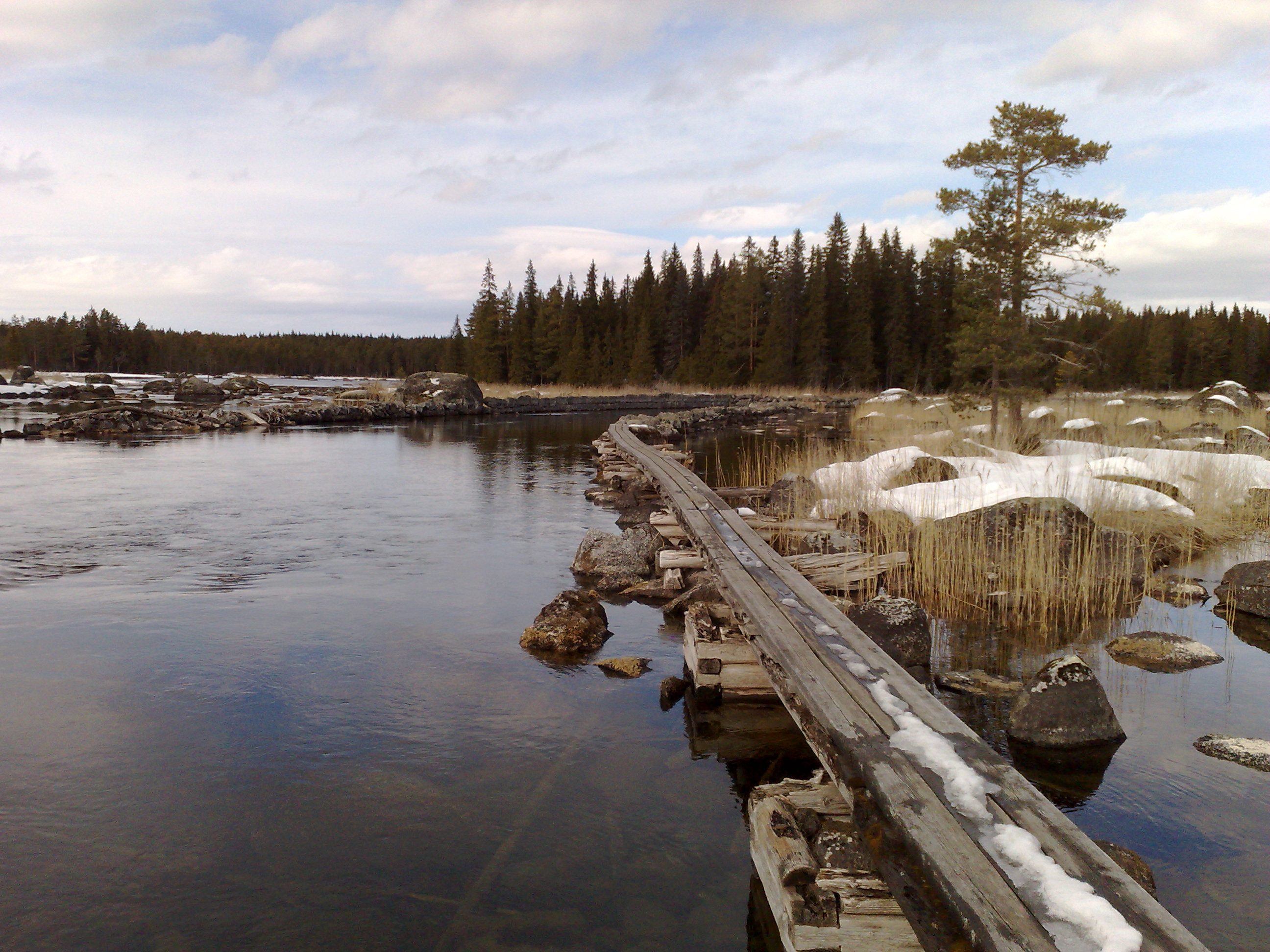
- Gimån in March 2008

Location
- Country: Sweden

Physical characteristics
- Source: Revsundssjön
- Mouth: Ljungan
  - location: Torpshammar
  - coordinates: 62°28′30″N 16°19′35″E
- Length: 170 km (110 mi)
- Basin size: 4,370 km^{2} (1,690 sq mi)

The Gimån (Swedish pronunciation: [ˈjɪ̂mːoːn]) is a river in Sweden.
