= Chahak, Anbarabad =

Chahak چاهك
- Village
- Location within Iran
- Coordinates: 28°18′58″N 58°11′19″E
- Country: Iran
- Province: Kerman
- County: Anbarabad
- Bakhsh: Jebalbarez-e Jonubi
- Rural District: Mardehek

Population (2006)
  - Total: 60
- Time zone: UTC+3:30 (IRST)
  - Summer (DST): UTC+4:30 (IRDT)

Chahak (Persian: چاهك, also Romanized as Chāhak; also known as Chāhak-e Bālā) is a village in Mardehek Rural District, Jebalbarez-e Jonubi District, Anbarabad County, Kerman Province, Iran. At the 2006 census, its population was 60, in 17 families.
