= Chahak, Manujan =

Chahak چاهك
- Village
- Country: Iran
- Province: Kerman
- County: Manujan
- Bakhsh: Aseminun
- Rural District: Deh Kahan

Population (2006)
  - Total: 82
- Time zone: UTC+3:30 (IRST)
  - Summer (DST): UTC+4:30 (IRDT)

Chahak (Persian: چاهك, also Romanized as Chāhak) is a village in Deh Kahan Rural District, Aseminun District, Manujan County, Kerman Province, Iran. At the 2006 census, its population was 82, in 18 families.
