= Deh-e Parviz Sarani =

Deh-e Parviz Sarani ده پرويز ساراني
- Village
- Location within Iran
- Coordinates: 31°12′04″N 61°46′05″E
- Country: Iran
- Province: Sistan and Baluchestan
- County: Hirmand
- Bakhsh: Qorqori
- Rural District: Qorqori

Population (2006)
  - Total: 26
- Time zone: UTC+3:30 (IRST)
  - Summer (DST): UTC+4:30 (IRDT)

Deh-e Parviz Sarani (Persian: ده پرويز ساراني, also Romanized as Deh-e Parvīz Sārānī; also known as Deh-e Parvīz) is a village in Qorqori Rural District, Qorqori District, Hirmand County, Sistan and Baluchestan Province, Iran. At the 2006 census, its population was 26, in 7 families.
