= Chahak, Jiroft =

Chahak چاهك
- Village
- Location within Iran
- Coordinates: 28°29′00″N 57°47′00″E
- Country: Iran
- Province: Kerman
- County: Jiroft
- Bakhsh: Central
- Rural District: Eslamabad

Population (2006)
  - Total: 44
- Time zone: UTC+3:30 (IRST)
  - Summer (DST): UTC+4:30 (IRDT)

Chahak (Persian: چاهك, also Romanized as Chāhak) is a village in Eslamabad Rural District, in the Central District of Jiroft County, Kerman Province, Iran. At the 2006 census, its population was 44, in 13 families.
