= Rig-e Malek District =

District in Sistan and Baluchestan province, Iran

Rig-e Malek District Persian: بخش ریگ ملک
- District
- Location within Iran
- Coordinates: 28°41′N 61°41′E
- Country: Iran
- Province: Sistan and Baluchestan
- County: Mirjaveh
- Capital: Rig-e Malek

Population (2016)
  - Total: 9,202
- Time zone: UTC+3:30 (IRST)

Rig-e Malek District (Persian: بخش ریگ ملک) is in Mirjaveh County, Sistan and Baluchestan province, Iran. Its capital is the city of Rig-e Malek.

== History ==
After the 2011 National Census, Mirjaveh District was separated from Zahedan County in the establishment of Mirjaveh County, which was divided into three districts and seven rural districts, with Mirjaveh as its capital and only city at the time. After the 2016 census, the village of Rig-e Malek was elevated to the status of a city.

== Demographics ==
=== Population ===
At the time of the 2016 census, the district's population was 9,202 inhabitants in 2,320 households.

=== Administrative divisions ===
Rig-e Malek District Population
Administrative Divisions	2016
Rig-e Malek RD	7,184
Tahlab RD	2,018
Rig-e Malek (city) (Note: Became a city after the 2016 census)	
Total	9,202
RD = Rural District
