= Geygan =

Geygan گيگن
- Village
- Location within Iran
- Coordinates: 25°49′04″N 57°44′08″E
- Country: Iran
- Province: Hormozgan
- County: Jask
- Bakhsh: Central
- Rural District: Jask

Population (2006)
  - Total: 270
- Time zone: UTC+3:30 (IRST)
  - Summer (DST): UTC+4:30 (IRDT)

Geygan (Persian: گيگن, also romanized as Gaigan, Gaygīn, Gey Gen, Gīgan, Gigen and Gīkan) is a village in Jask Rural District, in the Central District of Jask County, Hormozgan Province, Iran. At the 2006 census, its population was 270, in 55 families.
