= Chahuk, Razavi Khorasan =

Chahuk چاهوك
- Village
- Location within Iran
- Coordinates: 35°20′12″N 59°49′55″E
- Country: Iran
- Province: Razavi Khorasan
- County: Zaveh
- Bakhsh: Soleyman
- Rural District: Soleyman

Population (2006)
  - Total: 125
- Time zone: UTC+3:30 (IRST)
  - Summer (DST): UTC+4:30 (IRDT)

Chahuk (Persian: چاهوك, also Romanized as Chāhūk; also known as Chāhyūn) is a village in Soleyman Rural District, Soleyman District, Zaveh County, Razavi Khorasan Province, Iran. At the 2006 census, its population was 125, in 25 families.
