= Chahak, Bushehr =

Chahak چاهك
- Village
- Location within Iran
- Coordinates: 29°40′11″N 50°23′47″E
- Country: Iran
- Province: Bushehr
- County: Ganaveh
- Bakhsh: Central
- Rural District: Hayat Davud

Population (2006)
  - Total: 41
- Time zone: UTC+3:30 (IRST)
  - Summer (DST): UTC+4:30 (IRDT)

Chahak (Persian: چاهك, also Romanized as Chāhak; also known as Chāhuk) is a village in Hayat Davud Rural District, in the Central District of Ganaveh County, Bushehr Province, Iran. At the 2006 census, its population was 41, in 11 families.
