= Iranshahr, Iran =

City in Sistan and Baluchestan province, Iran

Iranshahr Balochi: اݔرانشهر
- City
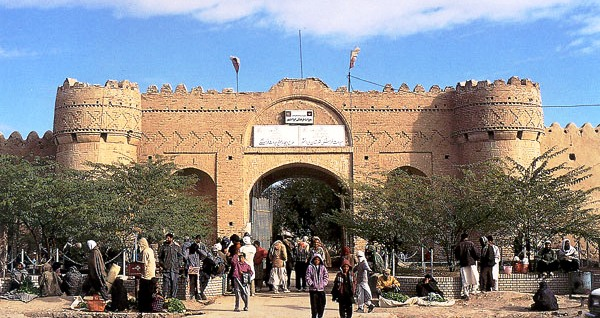
- Kohna Kalat

- Location within Iran
- Coordinates: 27°11′52″N 60°41′01″E
- Country: Iran
- Province: Sistan and Baluchestan
- County: Iranshahr
- District: Central

Population (2016)
  - Total: 113,750
- Time zone: UTC+3:30 (IRST)

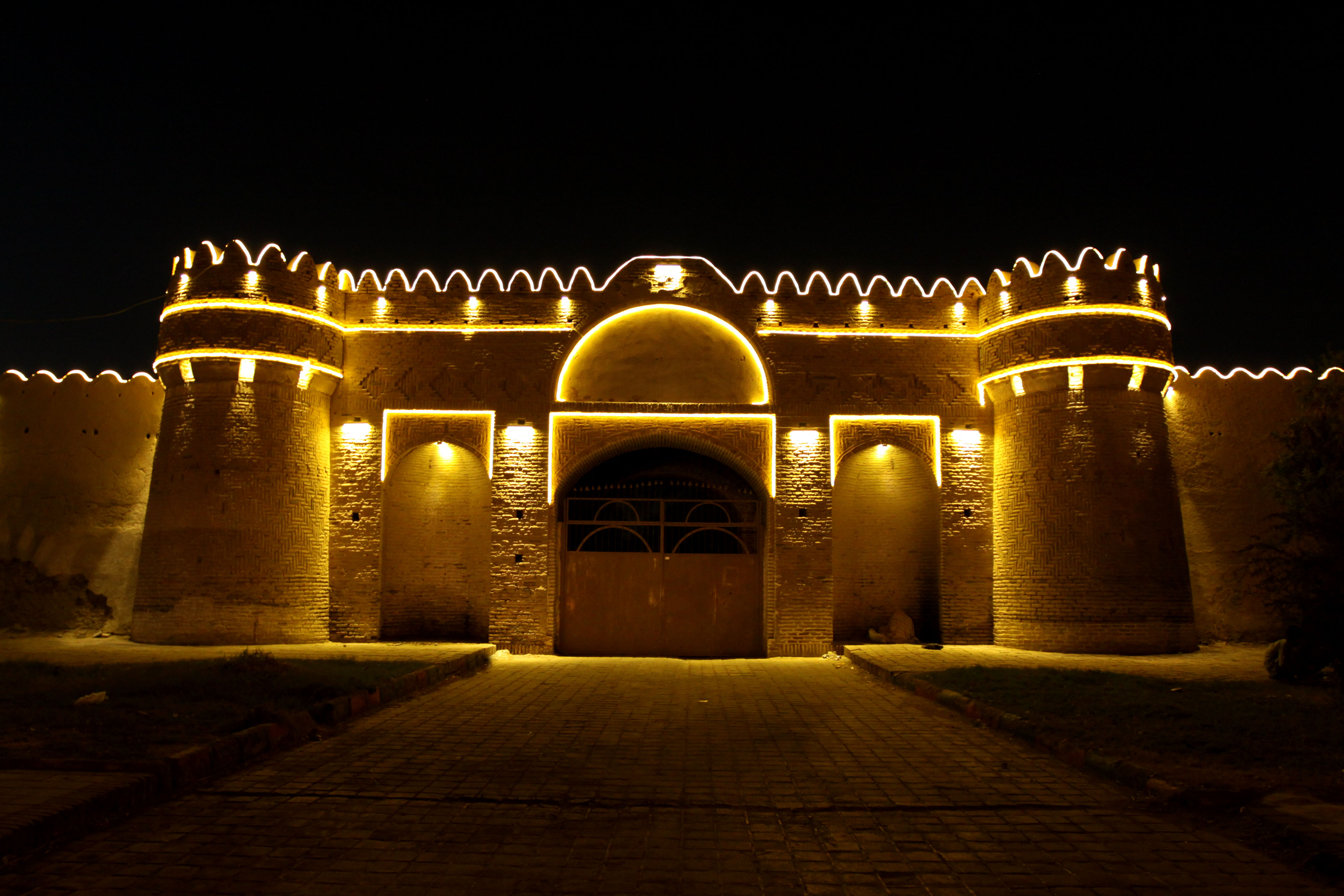
Naseri Castle, Iranshahr, Iran

Iranshahr (Persian: ايرانشهر and Balochi: اݔرانشهر) (Note: Also romanized as Īrānshahr; formerly, Fahrej, Pahrah, and Qal'eh-ye Nāşerī. Prior to 1935, the city was referred to as Pahrah (پهرہ), also known as Poora, Poorah, and Pura (English: Defense). The name was changed to Iranshahr by Mohammad Reza Shah Pahlavi around 1941) is a city in the Central District of Iranshahr County, Sistan and Baluchestan province, Iran, serving as capital of the province, the county, and the district. The city is near the borderlands between Iran and Pakistan where Baloch people live.

Pahrah (present-day Iranshahr) is the site where Alexander the Great celebrated with and regrouped his troops after his Indian conquests. Bampur, where the ancient Bampur fort is located, is near the city.

== Demographics ==
=== Population ===
Population history
Year	Pop.	±%
1956	3,618	—
1966	5,386	+48.9%
1976	11,386	+111.4%
1986	40,027	+251.5%
1991	56,581	+41.4%
1996	76,959	+36.0%
2006	99,496	+29.3%
2011	97,012	−2.5%
2016	113,750	+17.3%

At the time of the 2006 National Census, the city's population was 99,496 in 17,698 households. The following census in 2011 counted 97,012 people in 22,676 households. The 2016 census measured the population of the city as 113,750 people in 27,248 households.

== Climate ==
Iranshahr has a hot desert climate (Köppen climate classification BWh) with extremely hot summers and mild winters. Precipitation is very low, and mostly falls in winter.

Climate data for Iranshahr (1991–2020, extremes 1964–2025)
Month	Jan	Feb	Mar	Apr	May	Jun	Jul	Aug	Sep	Oct	Nov	Dec	Year
Record high °C (°F)	31.0 (87.8)	36.4 (97.5)	39.7 (103.5)	43.5 (110.3)	48.0 (118.4)	49.3 (120.7)	49.0 (120.2)	50.0 (122.0)	47.0 (116.6)	44.0 (111.2)	37.0 (98.6)	33.2 (91.8)	50.0 (122.0)
Mean daily maximum °C (°F)	21.4 (70.5)	24.2 (75.6)	28.8 (83.8)	35.4 (95.7)	41.0 (105.8)	44.3 (111.7)	44.4 (111.9)	43.3 (109.9)	40.6 (105.1)	35.5 (95.9)	28.7 (83.7)	23.6 (74.5)	34.3 (93.7)
Daily mean °C (°F)	14.6 (58.3)	17.5 (63.5)	22.1 (71.8)	28.4 (83.1)	34.1 (93.4)	37.4 (99.3)	37.8 (100.0)	36.4 (97.5)	33.3 (91.9)	28.1 (82.6)	21.3 (70.3)	16.3 (61.3)	27.3 (81.1)
Mean daily minimum °C (°F)	8.5 (47.3)	11.1 (52.0)	15.2 (59.4)	20.6 (69.1)	25.9 (78.6)	29.7 (85.5)	31.1 (88.0)	29.2 (84.6)	25.6 (78.1)	20.4 (68.7)	14.3 (57.7)	9.7 (49.5)	20.1 (68.2)
Record low °C (°F)	−2.0 (28.4)	−1.0 (30.2)	4.0 (39.2)	10.0 (50.0)	14.4 (57.9)	21.2 (70.2)	22.0 (71.6)	20.0 (68.0)	14.0 (57.2)	8.0 (46.4)	2.0 (35.6)	−6.0 (21.2)	−6.0 (21.2)
Average precipitation mm (inches)	21.2 (0.83)	19.2 (0.76)	18.9 (0.74)	5.8 (0.23)	1.8 (0.07)	4.7 (0.19)	7.3 (0.29)	5.1 (0.20)	0.8 (0.03)	3.6 (0.14)	2.7 (0.11)	12.8 (0.50)	103.9 (4.09)
Average precipitation days (≥ 1.0 mm)	2.5	2.1	2.8	0.7	0.4	0.6	1.0	0.6	0.2	0.4	0.5	1.4	13.2
Average rainy days	4.6	4.0	3.7	1.8	0.8	0.7	2.0	1.2	0.3	0.2	0.5	3.0	22.8
Average snowy days	0.1	0	0	0	0	0	0	0	0	0	0	0	0.1
Average relative humidity (%)	44.0	39.0	34.0	24.0	18.0	18.0	23.0	21.0	19.0	22.0	28.0	36.0	27.2
Average dew point °C (°F)	0.6 (33.1)	1.7 (35.1)	3.1 (37.6)	3.9 (39.0)	5.4 (41.7)	7.2 (45.0)	10.3 (50.5)	7.6 (45.7)	4.2 (39.6)	2.6 (36.7)	0.8 (33.4)	−0.6 (30.9)	3.9 (39.0)
Mean monthly sunshine hours	248	234	255	283	319	312	298	306	306	310	278	261	3,410
Source: NOAA (rainy days and snow days 1964-1990), Ogimet (April record high)

== See also ==
Media related to Iranshahr at Wikimedia Commons
