= Chahak, Eskelabad =

Chahak چاهك
- Village
- Location within Iran
- Coordinates: 28°40′33″N 60°51′03″E
- Country: Iran
- Province: Sistan and Baluchestan
- County: Khash
- Bakhsh: Nukabad
- Rural District: Eskelabad

Population (2006)
  - Total: 91
- Time zone: UTC+3:30 (IRST)
  - Summer (DST): UTC+4:30 (IRDT)

Chahak (Persian: چاهك, also Romanized as Chāhak; also known as Chāhūk and Chāqak) is a village in Eskelabad Rural District, Nukabad District, Khash County, Sistan and Baluchestan Province, Iran. At the 2006 census, its population was 91, in 17 families.
