= Damen District =

District in Sistan and Baluchestan province, Iran

Damen District Persian: بخش دامن
- District
- Location within Iran
- Coordinates: 27°24′03″N 60°46′22″E
- Country: Iran
- Province: Sistan and Baluchestan
- County: Iranshahr
- Capital: Zehlenfan
- Time zone: UTC+3:30 (IRST)

Damen District (Persian: بخش دامن) is in Iranshahr County, Sistan and Baluchestan province, Iran. Its capital is the village of Zehlenfan, whose population at the time of the 2016 National Census was 521 people in 130 households.

== History ==
After the 2016 census, Damen Rural District was separated from the Central District in the formation of Damen District.

== Demographics ==
=== Administrative divisions ===
Damen District
Administrative Divisions
Abadan RD
Damen RD
RD = Rural District
