= Bampur-e Sharqi Rural District =

Rural district in Sistan and Baluchestan province, Iran

Bampur-e Sharqi Rural District Persian: دهستان بمپور شرقي
- Rural District
- Location within Iran
- Coordinates: 27°10′05″N 60°32′41″E
- Country: Iran
- Province: Sistan and Baluchestan
- County: Bampur
- District: Central
- Capital: Nukjub

Population (2016)
  - Total: 21,244
- Time zone: UTC+3:30 (IRST)

Bampur-e Sharqi Rural District (Persian: دهستان بمپور شرقي) is in the Central District of Bampur County, Sistan and Baluchestan province, Iran. Its capital is the village of Nukjub.

== Demographics ==
=== Population ===
At the time of the 2006 National Census, the rural district's population (as a part of the former Bampur District of Iranshahr County) was 22,382 in 4,408 households. There were 19,131 inhabitants in 4,519 households at the following census of 2011. The 2016 census measured the population of the rural district as 21,244 in 5,471 households. The most populous of its 109 villages was Rig-e Kaput, with 3,491 people.

In 2017, the district was separated from the county in the establishment of Bampur County, and the rural district was transferred to the new Central District.
