= Ladiz District =

District in Sistan and Baluchestan province, Iran

Ladiz District Persian: بخش لادیز
- District
- Location within Iran
- Coordinates: 28°53′16″N 61°02′24″E
- Country: Iran
- Province: Sistan and Baluchestan
- County: Mirjaveh
- Capital: Ladiz-e Sofla

Population (2016)
  - Total: 22,960
- Time zone: UTC+3:30 (IRST)

Ladiz District (Persian: بخش لادیز) is in Mirjaveh County, Sistan and Baluchestan province, Iran. Its capital is the village of Ladiz-e Sofla.

== History ==
After the 2011 National Census, Mirjaveh District was separated from Zahedan County in the establishment of Mirjaveh County, which was divided into three districts and seven rural districts, with Mirjaveh as its capital and only city at the time.

== Demographics ==
=== Population ===
At the time of the 2016 census, the district's population was 22,960 inhabitants in 6,471 households.

=== Administrative divisions ===
Ladiz District Population
Administrative Divisions	2016
Junabad RD	6,455
Ladiz RD	7,981
Tamin RD	8,524
Total	22,960
RD = Rural District
