= Abreis Rural District =

Rural district in Sistan and Baluchestan province, Iran

Abreis Rural District Persian: دهستان آب رئيس
- Rural District
- Location within Iran
- Coordinates: 28°16′55″N 59°51′51″E
- Country: Iran
- Province: Sistan and Baluchestan
- County: Iranshahr
- District: Bazman
- Capital: Masjed Abu ol Fazl

Population (2016)
  - Total: 1,621
- Time zone: UTC+3:30 (IRST)

Abreis Rural District (Persian: دهستان آب رئيس) is in Bazman District of Iranshahr County, Sistan and Baluchestan province, Iran. Its capital is the village of Masjed Abu ol Fazl.

== Demographics ==
=== Population ===
At the time of the 2006 National Census, the rural district's population was 1,555 in 327 households. There were 1,827 inhabitants in 432 households at the following census of 2011. The 2016 census measured the population of the rural district as 1,621 in 426 households. The most populous of its 62 villages was Masjed Abu ol Fazl, with 258 people.
