= Howmeh Rural District (Iranshahr County) =

Rural district in Sistan and Baluchestan province, Iran

Howmeh Rural District Persian: دهستان حومه
- Rural District
- Location within Iran
- Coordinates: 27°05′06″N 60°43′21″E
- Country: Iran
- Province: Sistan and Baluchestan
- County: Iranshahr
- District: Central
- Capital: Shahr Deraz

Population (2016)
  - Total: 46,162
- Time zone: UTC+3:30 (IRST)

Howmeh Rural District (Persian: دهستان حومه) is in the Central District of Iranshahr County, Sistan and Baluchestan province, Iran. Its capital is the village of Shahr Deraz.

== Demographics ==
=== Population ===
At the time of the 2006 National Census, the rural district's population was 25,686 in 5,068 households. There were 31,668 inhabitants in 8,228 households at the following census of 2011. The 2016 census measured the population of the rural district as 46,162 in 11,012 households. The most populous of its 251 villages was Chah-e Jamal, with 8,144 people.
