= Central District (Mirjaveh County) =

District in Sistan and Baluchestan province, Iran

Central District (Mirjaveh County) Persian: بخش مرکزی شهرستان میرجاوه
- District
- Location within Iran
- Coordinates: 28°59′30″N 61°20′42″E
- Country: Iran
- Province: Sistan and Baluchestan
- County: Mirjaveh
- Capital: Mirjaveh

Population (2016)
  - Total: 13,195
- Time zone: UTC+3:30 (IRST)

The Central District of Mirjaveh County (Persian: بخش مرکزی شهرستان میرجاوه) is in Sistan and Baluchestan province, Iran. Its capital is the city of Mirjaveh.

== History ==
After the 2011 National Census, Mirjaveh District was separated from Zahedan County in the establishment of Mirjaveh County, which was divided into three districts and seven rural districts, with Mirjaveh as its capital and only city at the time.

== Demographics ==
=== Population ===
At the time of the 2016 census, the district's population was 13,195 inhabitants in 3,062 households.

=== Administrative divisions ===
Central District (Mirjaveh County) Population
Administrative Divisions	2016
Andeh RD	3,265
Howmeh RD	571
Mirjaveh (city)	9,359
Total	13,195
RD = Rural District
