= Damen Rural District =

Rural district in Sistan and Baluchestan province, Iran

Damen Rural District Persian: دهستان دامن
- Rural District
- Location within Iran
- Coordinates: 27°26′37″N 60°49′41″E
- Country: Iran
- Province: Sistan and Baluchestan
- County: Iranshahr
- District: Damen
- Capital: Kuran-e Sofla

Population (2016)
  - Total: 11,392
- Time zone: UTC+3:30 (IRST)

Damen Rural District (Persian: دهستان دامن) is in Damen District of Iranshahr County, Sistan and Baluchestan province, Iran. Its capital is the village of Kuran-e Sofla. The previous capital of the rural district was the village of Zehlenfan.

== Demographics ==
=== Population ===
At the time of the 2006 National Census, the rural district's population (as a part of the Central District) was 14,221 in 2,626 households. There were 11,277 inhabitants in 2,671 households at the following census of 2011. The 2016 census measured the population of the rural district as 11,392 in 2,970 households. The most populous of its 57 villages was Abadan, with 2,763 people.

After the census, the rural district was separated from the district in the formation of Damen District.
