= Mirjaveh District =

Former district in Sistan and Baluchestan province, Iran

Mirjaveh District Persian: بخش میرجاوه
- Former District
- Location within Iran
- Coordinates: 28°59′30″N 61°20′42″E
- Country: Iran
- Province: Sistan and Baluchestan
- County: Zahedan
- Capital: Mirjaveh

Population (2011)
  - Total: 39,873
- Time zone: UTC+3:30 (IRST)

Mirjaveh District (Persian: بخش میرجاوه) is a former administrative division of Zahedan County, Sistan and Baluchestan province, Iran. Its capital was the city of Mirjaveh.

== History ==
After the 2011 National Census, the district was separated from the county in the establishment of Mirjaveh County.

== Demographics ==
=== Population ===
At the time of the 2006 National Census, the district's population was 45,896 in 8,481 households. The following census in 2011 counted 39,873 people in 9,385 households.

=== Administrative divisions ===
Mirjaveh District Population
Administrative Divisions	2006	2011
Ladiz RD	23,953	21,712
Tamin RD	8,353	8,040
Mirjaveh (city)	13,590	10,121
Total	45,896	39,873
RD = Rural District
