= Mirjaveh County =

County in Sistan and Baluchestan province, Iran

Mirjaveh County Persian: شهرستان میرجاوه
- County
- Location of Mirjaveh County in Sistan and Baluchestan province (top center, purple)

- Location of Sistan and Baluchestan province in Iran
- Coordinates: 28°55′N 61°23′E
- Country: Iran
- Province: Sistan and Baluchestan
- Capital: Mirjaveh
- Districts: Central, Ladiz, Rig-e Malek

Population (2016)
  - Total: 45,357
- Time zone: UTC+3:30 (IRST)

Mirjaveh County (Persian: شهرستان میرجاوه) is in Sistan and Baluchestan province, Iran. Its capital is the city of Mirjaveh. The county is bordered by both Pakistan and Afghanistan.

== History ==
After the 2011 National Census, Mirjaveh District was separated from Zahedan County in the establishment of Mirjaveh County, which was divided into three districts and seven rural districts, with Mirjaveh as its capital and only city at the time. After the 2016 census, the village of Rig-e Malek was elevated to the status of a city.

== Demographics ==
=== Population ===
At the time of the 2016 census, the county's population was 45,357 in 11,853 households.

=== Administrative divisions ===
Mirjaveh County's population and administrative structure are shown in the following table.

Mirjaveh County Population
Administrative Divisions	2016
Central District	13,195
Andeh RD	3,265
Howmeh RD	571
Mirjaveh (city)	9,359
Ladiz District	22,960
Junabad RD	6,455
Ladiz RD	7,981
Tamin RD	8,524
Rig-e Malek District	9,202
Rig-e Malek RD	7,184
Tahlab RD	2,018
Rig-e Malek (city) (Note: Became a city after the 2016 census)	
Total	45,357
RD = Rural District

== See also ==
Media related to Mirjaveh County at Wikimedia Commons
