= Bazman Rural District =

Rural district in Sistan and Baluchestan province, Iran

Bazman Rural District Persian: دهستان بزمان
- Rural District
- Location within Iran
- Coordinates: 27°44′09″N 60°09′19″E
- Country: Iran
- Province: Sistan and Baluchestan
- County: Iranshahr
- District: Bazman
- Capital: Giman

Population (2016)
  - Total: 5,014
- Time zone: UTC+3:30 (IRST)

Bazman Rural District (Persian: دهستان بزمان) is in Bazman District of Iranshahr County, Sistan and Baluchestan province, Iran. Its capital is the village of Giman.

== Demographics ==
=== Population ===
At the time of the 2006 National Census, the rural district's population was 7,852 in 1,520 households. There were 3,914 inhabitants in 910 households at the following census of 2011. The 2016 census measured the population of the rural district as 5,014 in 1,308 households. The most populous of its 132 villages was Giman, with 752 people.
