= Abtar Rural District =

Rural district in Sistan and Baluchestan province, Iran

Abtar Rural District Persian: دهستان ابتر
- Rural District
- Location within Iran
- Coordinates: 27°14′44″N 61°00′59″E
- Country: Iran
- Province: Sistan and Baluchestan
- County: Iranshahr
- District: Central
- Capital: Abtar

Population (2016)
  - Total: 10,624
- Time zone: UTC+3:30 (IRST)

Abtar Rural District (Persian: دهستان ابتر) is in the Central District of Iranshahr County, Sistan and Baluchestan province, Iran. Its capital is the village of Abtar.

== Demographics ==
=== Population ===
At the time of the 2006 National Census, the rural district's population was 11,635 in 2,346 households. There were 10,061 inhabitants in 2,381 households at the following census of 2011. The 2016 census measured the population of the rural district as 10,624 in 2,936 households. The most populous of its 49 villages was Abtar, with 3,089 people.
