= Bazman District =

District in Sistan and Baluchestan province, Iran

Bazman District Persian: بخش بزمان
- District
- Location within Iran
- Coordinates: 27°57′49″N 60°04′31″E
- Country: Iran
- Province: Sistan and Baluchestan
- County: Iranshahr
- Capital: Bazman

Population (2016)
  - Total: 11,827
- Time zone: UTC+3:30 (IRST)

Bazman District (Persian: بخش بزمان) is in Iranshahr County, Sistan and Baluchestan province, Iran. Its capital is the city of Bazman.

== Demographics ==
=== Population ===
At the time of the 2006 National Census, the district's population was 13,409 in 2,663 households. The following census in 2011 counted 10,443 people in 2,413 households. The 2016 census measured the population of the district as 11,827 inhabitants in 3,089 households.

=== Administrative divisions ===
Bazman District Population
| Administrative Divisions | 2006 | 2011 | 2016 |
|---|---|---|---|
| Abreis RD | 1,555 | 1,827 | 1,621 |
| Bazman RD | 7,852 | 3,914 | 5,014 |
| Bazman (city) | 4,002 | 4,702 | 5,192 |
| Total | 13,409 | 10,443 | 11,827 |
RD = Rural District
