= Central District (Iranshahr County) =

District in Sistan and Baluchestan province, Iran

Central District (Iranshahr County) Persian: بخش مرکزی شهرستان ایرانشهر
- District
- Location within Iran
- Coordinates: 27°07′58″N 60°52′36″E
- Country: Iran
- Province: Sistan and Baluchestan
- County: Iranshahr
- Capital: Iranshahr

Population (2016)
  - Total: 181,928
- Time zone: UTC+3:30 (IRST)

The Central District of Iranshahr County (Persian: بخش مرکزی شهرستان ایرانشهر) is in Sistan and Baluchestan province, Iran. Its capital is the city of Iranshahr.

== History ==
After the 2016 National Census, Damen Rural District was separated from the district in the formation of Damen District.

== Demographics ==
=== Population ===
At the time of the 2006 census, the district's population was 151,038 in 27,738 households. The following census in 2011 counted 155,018 people in 35,956 households. The 2016 census measured the population of the district as 181,928 inhabitants in 4,166 households.

=== Administrative divisions ===
Central District (Iranshahr County) Population
Administrative Divisions	2006	2011	2016
Abtar RD	11,635	10,061	10,624
Damen RD (Note: Transferred to Damen District after the 2016 census)	14,221	11,277	11,392
Howmeh RD	25,686	36,668	46,162
Iranshahr (city)	99,496	97,012	113,750
Total	151,038	155,018	181,928
RD = Rural District
