= Iranshahr County =

County in Sistan and Baluchestan province, Iran

Iranshahr County Persian: شهرستان ایرانشهر
- County
- Location of Iranshahr County in Sistan and Baluchestan province (center left, pink)

- Location of Sistan and Baluchestan province in Iran
- Coordinates: 27°40′40″N 60°20′02″E
- Country: Iran
- Province: Sistan and Baluchestan
- Capital: Iranshahr
- Districts: Central, Bazman, Damen

Population (2016)
  - Total: 254,314
- Time zone: UTC+3:30 (IRST)

Iranshahr County (Persian: شهرستان ایرانشهر) is in Sistan and Baluchestan province, Iran. Its capital is the city of Iranshahr.

== History ==
After the 2006 National Census, the village of Mohammadabad was elevated to city status as Mohammadan. In addition, Dalgan District was separated from the county in the establishment of Dalgan County.

After the 2016 census, Damen Rural District was separated from the Central District in the formation of Damen District, including the new Abadan Rural District. In 2018, Bampur District was separated from the county to establish Bampur County.

== Demographics ==
=== Population ===
At the time of the 2006 census, the county's population was 264,226 in 49,443 households. The following census in 2011 counted 219,796 people in 50,978 households. The 2016 census measured the population of the county as 254,314, in 62,625 households.

=== Administrative divisions ===
Iranshahr County's population history and administrative structure over three consecutive censuses are shown in the following table.

Iranshahr County Population
Administrative Divisions	2006	2011	2016
Central District	151,038	155,018	181,928
Abtar RD	11,635	10,061	10,624
Damen RD	14,221	11,277	11,392
Howmeh RD	25,686	36,668	46,162
Iranshahr (city)	99,496	97,012	113,750
Bampur District (Note: Transferred to Bampur County)	47,360	54,042	60,557
Bampur-e Gharbi RD	15,905	16,647	16,794
Bampur-e Sharqi RD	22,382	19,131	21,244
Bampur (city)	9,073	10,071	12,217
Mohammadan (city) (Note: Formerly the village of Mohammadabad)		8,193	10,302
Bazman District	13,409	10,443	11,827
Abreis RD	1,555	1,827	1,621
Bazman RD	7,852	3,914	5,014
Bazman (city)	4,002	4,702	5,192
Dalgan District (Note: Transferred to Dalgan County)	52,419		
Dalgan RD	23,068		
Hudian RD	3,708		
Jolgeh-ye Chah Hashem RD	22,644		
Galmurti (city)	2,999		
Damen District (Note: Established after the 2016 census)			
Abadan RD			
Damen RD			
Total	264,226	219,796	254,314
RD = Rural District

== See also ==
Media related to Iranshahr County at Wikimedia Commons
