= List of castles in Iran =

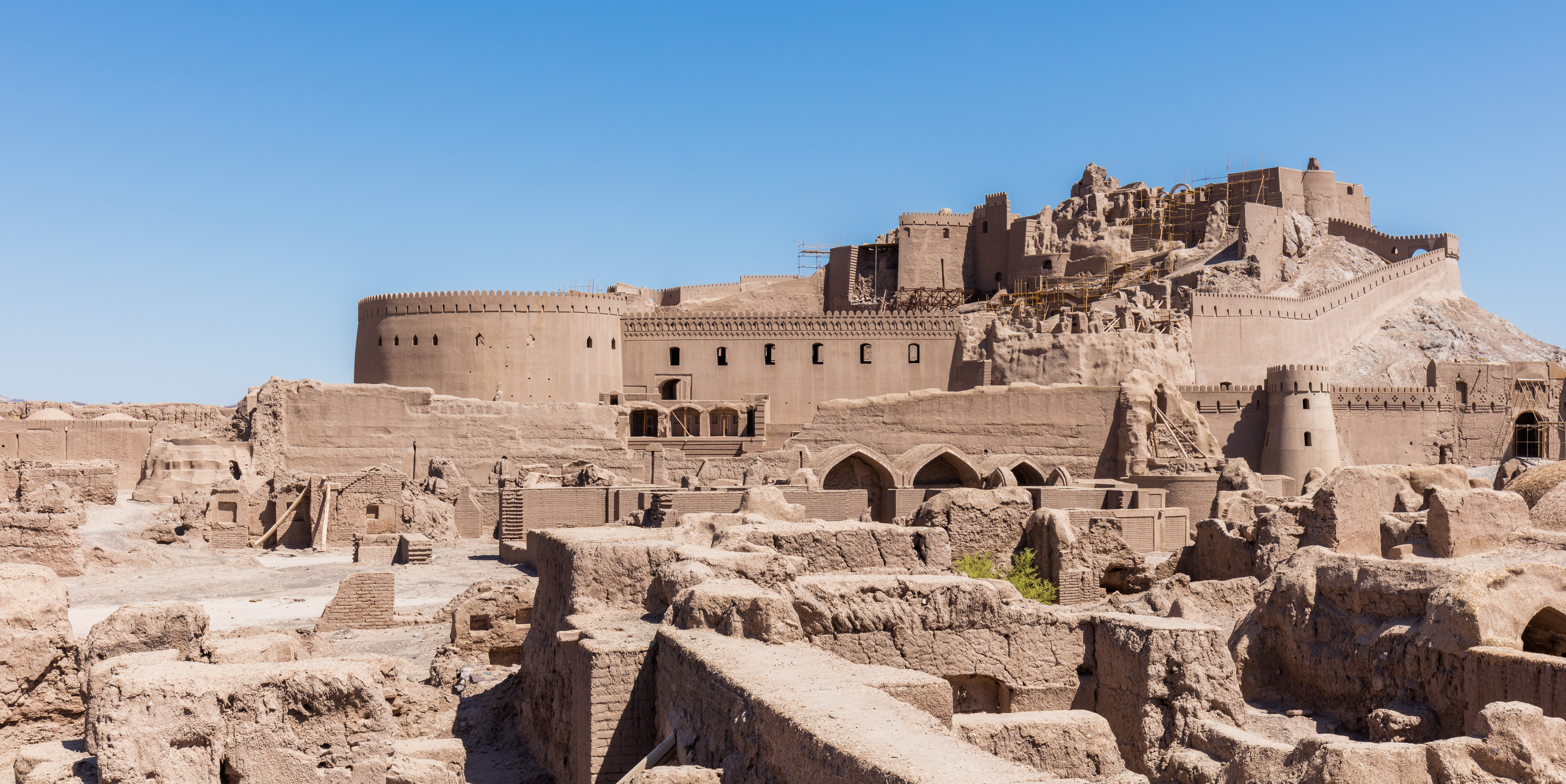
Bam Castle can be traced back to the Achaemenid Empire. It has been named a World Heritage Site.

Throughout the history of Iran, especially in prehistoric and early history, castles have played an important role in the fortification of the country. They were usually maintained by officials on important routes or cities, and most of them were in unmarked heights with steep slopes or cliffs. Such places have always served as a natural defenses against enemies and offer a panoramic view of the surrounding lands, so cities and surrounding lands can be defended. Most of Iran's castles had springs or wells, except for those that were previously surrounded by water.

== Important castles ==
Name	Location	Picture	Notes
Arg-e Bam	Bam		There is no precise archaeological dating of the buildings of the Citadel of Bam. But through historic sources and ancient texts, the first human settlement in the area can be traced back to the fort built by the Achaemenians around 579–323 BC. Some of the citadel's features such as its establishment on a platform combining a natural hilltop and a manmade terrace have been compared by archaeologists to the Achaemenian model of Persepolis. During the Parthian rule, the fort was expanded and became Arg-e-Bam, the Citadel of Bam.
Alamut Castle	Alamut		The Alamut castle was built by the Justanid ruler Wahsudan b. Marzuban, a follower of Zaydi Shi'ism, around 865 AD. During a hunting trip, he witnessed a soaring eagle perch down high on a rock. Realizing the tactical advantage of this location, he chose the site for the construction of a fortress, which was called "Aluh āmū[kh]t" likely meaning "Eagle's Teaching" or "Nest of Punishment". Alamut remained under Justanid control until the arrival of the Isma'ili chief da’i (missionary) Hasan-i Sabbah to the castle in 1090 AD, marking the start of the Alamut period in Nizari Isma'ili history.
Atashgah Castle	Kashmar		The location of the castle is strategically interesting. This fort is one of the most prominent and superior ancient forts of Iran in terms of inaccessibility and resistance against invaders and easily competes with the fortifications of Babak Fort in Kaleybar and Alamut Castle in Alamut. This shows that the builders of the castle have carried out extensive field studies to locate it. In total, Atashgah Castle is built on a high rocky cliff and difficult to cross, three sides of which are high and dangerous precipices. Around this cliff, shortly after the precipices, the walls of other high cliffs have re-enclosed it in the form of impenetrable and inaccessible fortifications.
Babak Fort	Kaleybar		The castle, built on 2300–2600 meter heights, surrounded by 400 to 600 meter gorges, is accessed via a long series of broken steps that lead to the top of a hill. Thereafter, the easiest route is a long dirt track. No signs lead to the Castle. At the end of the dirt track, the route turns left. The first sign of the ruins appears on the left, leaving two peaks to cross. The first peak has views of the Castle. After ascending a second peak, with additional ruins, the trail passes sheer cliffs on the right with no railings.
Falak-ol-Aflak	Khoramabad		Falak-ol-Aflak castle is amongst the most important structures built during the Sassanid era. It has been known by a number of names since it was built over 1800 years ago. Recorded names have referred to it as Shapur-Khast or Sabr-Khast fortress, Dezbaz, Khoramabad castle, and ultimately the Falak-ol-Aflak Castle. Under the Pahlavi dynasty, after being used as a prison until 1968, it was transformed into a museum complex.
Iraj Castle	Asgarabad-e Abbasi		The structure consists of an empty area approximately 175 hectares (430 acres), surrounded by a wall 15–22 metres (49–72 ft) in width and up to 25 metres (82 ft) in height. It featured 148 densely spaced towers and four monumental gates. The massive walls contained a wealth of embedded structures: a row of around 828 rooms (circa 12 square metres (130 sq ft) in size) and hundreds of monumental arches, evoking royal Sasanian architecture. The structure was further protected by a ditch around the wall. A population of 2,000-6,000 could have been accommodated in the walls.
Izad-Khast Castle	Izadkhvast		The history of the castle complex dates back to the pre-Islamic era of Iran. Izad-Khast is a Sassanid castle, built during the Sassanid Empire (224 to 651 AD) which ruled Persia (Iran) and many parts of the surrounding countries. It was then used, added and improved on until Qajars era (1794 to 1925). This has left works inside the castle belonging to different periods from Sassanids to Qajars with different architectural styles.
Rudkhan Castle	Fuman County		Rudkhan Castle sits at the two peaks of a mountain at elevations of 715 and 670 metres and contains strong fortifications and battlements at a length of 1,550 metres. The castle's 42 towers still stand intact.
Rayen Castle	Rayen		it's become an attractive touristic destination. During the reign of third Yazdgerd, the Sasanid King, Arabs could not conquer this city due to its high walls.
Qal'eh Dokhtar	Firuzabad		The 1,800-year-old castle has lost some four meters of its original height over the last century and experts warn if urgent measures are not taken to enforce it, the castle may soon collapse.
Narin Castle	Meybod		This building has been built as an old fortress with 3 different floors, each for a different class of society. Although all outer gates have been destroyed the inner castle still exists. You can still see some of the outer walls.

== List of castles in Iran ==
This is a list of castles in Iran.

=== A ===
Name	Persian name	Location	Founder and Era	Picture
Aamaj Castle	قلعه آماج	Bastak County	Sasanian Empire	
Ab Sefid Ab Castle	قلعه آب سفید آب	Kashan County	Safavid dynasty	
Abdanan Castle	قلعه آبدانان	Posht Qaleh	Sasanian Empire	
Abarndabad Castle	قلعه ابرندآباد	Yazd County	Sasanian Empire	
Abhar castle	قلعه ابهر	Abhar County	Historical periods after Islam	
Abyaneh	ابيانه	Natanz County	Sasanian Empire	
Abtar Castle	قلعه ابتر	Iranshahr County	Qajar dynasty	
Afrasiab Khan Castle	قلعه افراسیاب خان	Arsanjan County	Qajar dynasty	
Ahmadabad Castle	قلعه احمدآباد	Abarkuh County	Qajar dynasty	
Agha Khan Liravi-ye Castle	قلعه آقا خان لیراوی	Deylam County	Qajar dynasty	
Aghur Castle	قلعه آغور	Abhar County	Timurid Empire	
Allahabad Castle	قلعه الله‌آباد	Ardakan County	Safavid dynasty	
Alamut Castle	قلعه الموت	Masoudabad, Qazvin	Before the Medes	
Arbabi Castle	قلعه اربابی	Azna County	Qajar dynasty	
Ardalan Castle	قلعه اردلان	Tuyserkan County	Qajar dynasty	
Ardi Castle	قلعه اردی	Abarkuh County	Qajar dynasty	
Arudasht Lar Castle	قلعه آرودشت لار	Amol County	Historical periods after Islam	
Aliabad Castle, Birjand	قلعه علی‌آباد	Birjand County	Qajar dynasty	
Aliabad Castle, Pish Kuh	قلعه علی‌آباد	Taft County	Historical periods after Islam	
Ali Ahmad Domab Castle	قلعه علی احمد دماب	Domab, Isfahan	Qajar dynasty	
Ammameh Castle	قلعه امامه	Shemiranat County	Ziyarid dynasty	
Ardal Castle	قلعه اردل	Ardal County	Qajar dynasty	
Ardeshir Castle	قلعه اردشیر	Kerman	Sasanian Empire	
Arrajan Castle	قلعه ارجان	Behbahan	Sasanian Empire	
Arg Bala Castle	قلعه ارگ بالا	Bojnord County	Parthian Empire	
Arg of Alma Dushen	ارگ آلمادوشن	Bojnord County	Parthian Empire	
Arg of Anar	ارگ انار	Anar County	Sasanian Empire	
Arg of Karim Khan	ارگ کریم‌خان	Shiraz	Zand dynasty	
Arg of Kashmar	ارگ کاشمر	Kashmar	Qajar dynasty	
Arg of Kolah Farangi	ارگ بیرجند	Birjand County	Qajar dynasty	
Arg of Murcheh Khvort	ارگ مورچه خورت	Shahin Shahr and Meymeh County	Ninth century AH	
Arg of Tabas	ارگ طبس	Tabas		
Arg of Tabriz	ارگ تبریز	Tabriz	Ilkhanate	
Arg-e Bam	ارگ بم	Bam, Iran	Achaemenid Empire	
Aghli Beg Castle	قلعه اغلی بگ	Baneh County		
Akbar Khan Castle	قلعه اکبرخان	Eslamabad-e Gharb County	Chalcolithic	
Akh Kand Bala Castle	قلعه آخکند بالا	Bijar County	Middle Ages Historical periods after Islam	
Akh Kand Pain Castle	قلعه آخکند پائین	Bijar County	Historical periods after Islam	
Anjir Dehloran Castle	قلعه انجیر دهلران	Dehloran County	Sasanian Empire	
Angosht Gabri Castle	قلعه انگشت گبری	Sarvestan County	Sasanian Empire	
Ashpaz Khaneh Zahhak Castle	قلعه آشپزخانه ضحاک	Fasa County	Parthian Empire	
Asil Castle	قلعه اصیل	Ardakan County	Afsharid dynasty	
Asgarabad Castle	قلعه عسگرآباد	Urmia County	Qajar dynasty	
Asu Castle	قلعه آسو	Birjand County	Timurid Empire	
Aq Bolagh Castle	قلعه آقبلاغ	Borujerd County	Qajar dynasty	
Aq Qaleh Golabar Castle	قلعه آق قلعه گلابر	Ijrud County	Middle Ages Historical periods after Islam	
Avarsin Castle	قلعه آوارسین	Kaleybar County	1st millennium BC	
Atashgah Castle	قلعه آتشگاه	Kashmar	Sasanian Empire	
Atashgah Castle	قلعه آتشگاه	Qehi	Safavid dynasty	
Azna Castle	قلعه ازنا	Azna County	Prehistoric times of ancient Iran	
Azhdeha Peykar Castle	قلعه اژدهاپیکر	Lar, Iran	Sasanian Empire	
Azizabad Castle	قلعه عزیزآباد	Boshruyeh County	Qajar dynasty	

=== B ===
Name	Persian name	Location	Founder and Era	Picture
Babak Fort	قلعه بابک	Kaleybar	Sasanian Empire	
Babuk Castle	قلعه بابوک	Birjand County	Qajar dynasty	
Bahaabad Castle	قلعه بهاءآباد	Zarand County	Safavid dynasty	
Bandbon castle	قلعه بندبن	Rudsar County	Hundreds of years ago	
Bakhtak Leylan Castle	قلعه بختک لیلان	Leylan		
Bampur Castle	قلعه بمپور	Bampur	Sasanian Empire	
Ban Qaleh	بان‌قلعه	Qasr-e Shirin County	Sasanian Empire	
Baqerabad Castle	قلعه باقرآباد	Bafq County	Qajar dynasty	
Bagh Tirjerd Castle	قلعه باغ تیرجرد	Abarkuh County	Qajar dynasty	
Bar Bar Castle	قلعه بربر	Onar, Ardabil	9th century	
Bard Zanjir Castle	قلعه بردزنجیر	Javanrud County	Parthian Empire	
Bardarud Castle	قلعه بردارود	Torshiz (Kashmar)		
Bardel Castle	قلعه بردل	Andimeshk County	Safavid dynasty	
Bardestan Castle	قلعه بردستان	Bardestan	Qajar dynasty	
Bajul Ab Barik Castle	قلعه باجول آب باریک	Aligudarz County	Qajar dynasty	
Bajul Castle	قلعه باجول	Aligudarz County	Zand dynasty and Qajar dynasty	
Baloch Got Castle	قلعه بلوچ گت	Tis, Iran	1st millennium BC	
Barvish Kani Castle	قلعه برویشکانی	Baneh County		
Bayazeh Castle	قلعه بیاضه	Khur and Biabanak County	Sasanian Empire	
Bazm Castle	قلعه بزم	Bavanat County	Late centuries of post-Islamic historical periods	
Bedaf Castle	قلعه بدافت	Abarkuh County	Sasanian Empire	
Behestan Castle	قلعه بهستان	Mahneshan County	Sasanian Empire	
Belqeys Castle	قلعه بلقیس	Esfarayen	Sasanian Empire	
Bezanjerd Castle	قلعه بزنجرد	Bezanjerd	More than 200 years	
Bidesgan Castle	قلعه بیدسکان	Bidesgan	Qajar dynasty	
Bidvaz Castle	قلعه بیدواز	Bidvaz	Parthian Empire	
Birjand Castle	قلعه بیرجند	Birjand	Safavid dynasty	
Biuk Khan Castle	قلعه بیوک خان	Abhar County	Timurid Empire	
Borazjan Castle	دژ برازجان	Borazjan	Qajar dynasty	
Buyni Yugun Castle	قلعه بوینی یوغون	Nir County	Achaemenid Empire	

=== C ===
Name	Persian name	Location	Founder and Era	Picture
Chah Afzal castle	قلعه چاه افضل	Ardakan County	Safavid dynasty	
Chah Nu castle	قلعه چاه نو	Ardakan County	Afsharid dynasty	
Chahkanduk castle	قلعه چهکندوک	Birjand County	Qajar dynasty	
Chaleshtar castle	قلعه چالشتر	Chaleshtar	Qajar dynasty	
Chanef castle	قلعه چانف	Nik Shahr County	Qajar dynasty	
Chavar Qala Castle	قلعه چوارقلا	Ilam County		
Chakor Buli Chavar Castle	قلعه چکر بولی چوار	Ilam County		
Chehel Dar castle	قلعه چهل در	Savadkuh County	13th century	
Chehel Dokhtar Castle	قلعه چهل دختر	Iranshahr County	Sasanian Empire	
Chehel Dokhtar castle	قلعه چهل دختر	Qaen County	Nizari Ismaili state	
Chehel Dokhtaran castle	قلعه چهل دختران	Hamun County	Sasanian Empire	
Chehriq	قلعه چهریق	Chahriq-e Olya	Before the Medes	
Chimarud castle	قلعه چیمارود	Rudbar County	Nizari Ismaili state	
Chobin Castle	قلعه چوبین	Malayer County	Sasanian Empire	
Chogha Zanbil	چغازنبیل	Susa	Elam	
Chowgan castle	قلعه چوگان	Bafq County	Qajar dynasty	

=== D ===
Name	Persian name	Location	Founder and Era	Picture
Dag Castle	قلعه داغ	Ahar County	Sasanian Empire	
Daman Castle	قلعه دامن	Iranshahr County	Qajar dynasty	
Dashtab Castle	قلعه های دشتاب	Baft County	More than 4 centuries	
Davudabad Castle	قلعه داوودآباد	Anar County	Safavid dynasty	
Deh Asgar Castle	قلعه ده عسگر	Behabad County	Qajar dynasty	
Deh Kord Castle	قلعه دهکرد	Borujerd County	Qajar dynasty	
Deh Shad Castle	قلعه دهشاد	Shahriar County	Qajar dynasty	
Deh-e Khvajeh Castle	قلعه ده خواجه	Rafsanjan County	Late Centuries Historical Periods of Islam	
Dezak Castle	قلعه دزک	Dezak	Qajar dynasty	
Dezh Estakhr Castle	قلعه دژ استخر	Birjand County	Safavid dynasty and Qajar dynasty	
Didehban Castle	قلعه دیده‌بان	Bastak County		
Dimdim Castle	قلعه دیمدیم	West Azerbaijan Province	Emirate of Bradost (Rebuilt)	
Div Castle	قلعه دیو	Meshginshahr	Urartu	
Do Qolleh Castle	قلعه دوقله	Abadeh County	Historical periods after Islam	
Do Sineh Castle	قلعه دوسینه	Baneh County		
Dokhtaran Castle	قلعه دختران	Maragheh County	Historical periods after Islam	
Doran Castle	قلعه دران	Kerman County	Zand dynasty	
Dulab Castle	قلعه دولاب	Bastak County	Sasanian Empire	
Dutch Castle	قلعه هلندی‌ها	Kharg Island	1748 AD	

=== E ===
Name	Persian name	Location	Founder and Era	Picture
Esfandaqeh castle	قلعه اسفندقه	Jiroft County	Pahlavi dynasty	
Estanavand Naruheh castle	قلعه استاناوند ناروهه	Garmsar County	Nizari Ismaili state	
Eshgaft-e Moneh castle	قلعه اشگفت منه	Bastak County	Sasanian Empire	
Eshkanan castle	قلعه اشکنان	Lamerd County	Qajar dynasty	
Espakeh castle	قلعه اسپکه	Espakeh	Middle Ages Historical periods after Islam	
Espidezh castle	قلعه اسپیدژ	Iranshahr County	Early centuries of historical periods after Islam	
Ernan castle	قلعه ارنان	Ernan, Yazd	Qajar dynasty	

=== F ===
Name	Persian name	Location	Founder and Era	Picture
Falak-ol-Aflak	فلک‌الافلاک	Khorramabad	Sasanian Empire	
Falis castle	قلعه فالیس	Taleqan County	Historical periods after Islam	
Fathabad castle	قلعه فتح‌آباد	Ekhtiarabad		
Fatuyeh castle	قلعه فتویه	Bastak County	Pre-Islamic period	
Faizabad castle	قلعه فیض‌آباد	Buin Zahra County	Historical periods after Islam	
Fin Castle	قلعه فین	Bandar Abbas County		
Firuzabad castle	قلعه فیروزآباد	Sarbaz County	Historical periods after Islam	
Firuzkuh castle	قلعه فیروزکوه	Firuzkuh	13th century	
Faradonbeh castle	قلعه فرادنبه	Borujen County	Qajar dynasty	
Forud Castle	قلعه فرود	Kalat	Parthian Empire	
Fort of Our Lady of the Conception	قلعه هرمز	Hormuz Island	Safavid dynasty	
Furg Citadel	قلعه فورگ	Furg, Darmian	Afsharid dynasty	

=== G ===
Name	Persian name	Location	Founder and Era	Picture
Gabar Hesar castle	قلعه گبر حصار	Kuhsorkh County	second to fifth centuries AH	
Gabaran castle	قلعه گبران	Savojbolagh County	Historical periods after Islam	
Gabri Castle	قلعه گبری	Ray	Sasanian Empire	
Gabri Dehdaq Castle	قلعه گبری دهدق	Abadeh County		
Gachi castle	قلعه گچی	Arsanjan County		
Gahur Castle	قلعه گهور	Eshtehard		
Gari Kouh Tower	برج گری کوه	Kuhij		
Ganj Ali Khan castle	قلعه گنجعلیخان	Kerman County	Safavid dynasty	
Gerdkooh Hills	تپه گردکوه جمنان	Qaem Shahr	Parthian Empire	
Gerdkuh	گردکوه	Damghan		
Garmez castle	قلعه گرمز	Behbahan County	Sasanian Empire	
Geli castle	قلعه گلی	Mohammadabad, Qomrud	Parthian Empire	
Golshekanan castle	قلعه گل شکنان	Ardestan County	Safavid dynasty	
Gouged Stronghold	ارگ گوگد	Guged		
Gud Qalat castle	قلعه گود قلات	Arsanjan County	Sasanian Empire	
Guria castle	قلعه گوریا	Eyvan County	Sasanian Empire	
Gurkanan castle	قلعه گورکنن	Esfarayen County	Early and middle centuries of post-Islamic historical periods	

=== H ===
Name	Persian name	Location	Founder and Era	Picture
Haruni castle	قلعه هارونی	Abarkuh County	Sasanian Empire	
Hamzehkhani castle	قلعه حمزه خانی	Qir and Karzin County	Qajar dynasty	
Haj Wakil castle	قلعه حاج وکیل	Arak	Qajar dynasty	
Hajjiabad castle	قلعه حاجی‌آباد	Hajjiabad County	Ilkhanate, Timurid Empire and Safavid Empire	
Hasan Abdal castle	قلعه حسن ابدال	Bahar County	Qajar dynasty and Pahlavi dynasty	
Heriduk castle	قلعه هریدوک	Nik Shahr County	Qajar dynasty	
Heliveh castle	قلعه هلیوه	Abdanan County	Sasanian Empire	
Hesar castle	قلعه حصار	Deylam County	Qajar dynasty	
Hezar Darb castle	قلعه هزار درب	Abdanan	Sasanian Empire	
Hezarani castle	قلعه هزارانی	Abdanan County	Sasanian Empire	
Hezareh castle	قلعه هزاره	Minab	Qajar dynasty	
Hoseynabad castle	قلعه حسین‌آباد	Taft County	Zand dynasty	
Hoshoun castle	قلعه هشون	Baft County	Safavid dynasty	
Hosseini castle	قلعه حسینی	Andimeshk County	Safavid dynasty	
Howgend castle	قلعه هوگند	Howgend	Qajar dynasty	
Howz Gholam Kesh castle	قلعه حوض غلام کش	Birjand County	7th and 8th centuries AH	
Hoz Leh castle	قلعه حوض له	Abhar County	Historical periods after Islam	
Hulagu Khan castle	قلعه هولاکوخان	Osku County	Sasanian Empire	

=== I ===
Irandegan_Castle.jpgName	Persian name	Location	Founder and Era	Picture
Ilud castle	قلعه ایلود	Bastak County	Parthian Empire and Safavid dynasty	
Iraj Castle	قلعه ایرج	Pishva County	Sasanian Empire	
Irandegan castle	قلعه ایرندگان	Deh Qaleh	Qajar dynasty	
Ismail Khan castle	قلعه اسماعیل‌خان	Ilam County	Historical periods after Islam	
Ispahbudhan castle	قلعه اسپهبدان	Rudbar County	Nizari Ismaili state	
Izad-Khast Castle	دژ ایزدخواست	Izadkhast	Sasanian Empire	

=== J ===
Name	Persian name	Location	Founder and Era	Picture
Jalal al-Din Castle	قلعه جلال‌الدین	Jajarm County		
Jalali Castle	قلعه جلالی	Kashan	Seljuq dynasty	
Jamshidi Castle	قلعه جمشیدی	Nimvar	Sasanian Empire	
Jiq Qareh Tapeh Daz Castle	قلعه جیق قره تپه داز	Aqqala County	Historical periods after Islam	
Junqan Castle	قلعه جونقان	Junqan	Qajar dynasty	
Jushin Castle	قلعه جوشین	Varzaqan County	Sasanian Empire	

=== K ===
Name	Persian name	Location	Founder and Era	Picture
Kafar castle	قلعه کافر	Garmsar County	Middle Ages and Late Historical Periods of Islam	
Kafar Qaleh, Esfarayen	کافر قلعه	Esfarayen County	Parthian Empire	
Kafar Qaleh, Mehdishahr	کافرقلعه	Mehdishahr County	Nizari Ismaili state	
Kafar Qaleh, Qazvin	کافرقلعه	Qazvin County	Historical periods after Islam	
Kafar Qaleh Si	کافرقلعه سی	Salmas County	1st millennium BC	
Kafaran castle	قلعه کافران	Raz and Jargalan County	Early and middle centuries of post-Islamic historical periods	
Kafarha castle	قلعه کافرها	Estahban County	Middle Ages Historical periods after Islam	
Kalat Ahram castle	قلعه کلات اهرم	Ahram	Qajar dynasty	
Kalisham castle	قلعه کلیشم	Rudbar County	Iron Age	
Kan shir Kesh Olya castle	قلعه کن شیر کش علیا	Bijar County	1st millennium BC	
Kani Now Castle	قلعه کانی ناو	Baneh County		
Kangelo Castle	قلعه کنگلو	Kangelo	Sasanian Empire	
Kati Abu ol Hasan Kola castle	قلعه کتی ابوالحسن‌کلا	Babol County	Historical periods after Islam	
Karshahi Castle	قلعه کرشاهی	Abuzeydabad	Qajar dynasty	
Kamar Qala castle	قلعه کمر قلاع	Birjand County		
Kamiz castle	قلعه کمیز	Rudan County	middle of post-Islamic historical periods	
Kak Kahzad Castle	قلعه کک کهزاد	Dana County	Sasanian Empire	
Kak Kahzad Castle	قلعه کک کهزاد	Hamun County	Parthian Empire and Sasanian Empire	
Kazhdom castle	قلعه کژدم	Izeh County	Early centuries of historical periods after Islam	
Keshit castle	قلعه کشیت	Keshit, Kerman	Seljuq dynasty	
Khamir castle	قلعه خمیر	Bandar Khamir	Qajar dynasty	
Khan Baghi castle	قلعه خان باغی	Bijar County	Historical periods after Islam	
Khan Bastak castle	قلعه خان بستک	Bastak County	Qajar dynasty	
Khanabad Castle	قلعه خان‌آباد	Isfahan County	Qajar dynasty	
Khanik castle	قلعه خانیک	Ferdows County	Age of Insecurity and the Absence of Security Forces (Nizari Ismaili state)	
Khandan Bahadori castle	قلعه خاندان بهادری	Komijan County	Qajar dynasty	
Khavidak castle	قلعه خویدک	Khavidak	Sasanian Empire	
Kheyrabad Castle	قلعه خیرآباد	Varamin County	Qajar dynasty	
Kheshti castle	قلعه خشتی	Nushabad	Seljuq dynasty	
Khorashad castle	قلعه خراشاد	Birjand County	11th to 13th centuries AH	
Khormoj castle	قلعه خورموج	Khormoj	Qajar dynasty	
Khosrow castle	قلعه خسرو	Ardabil County		
Khosrowabad Castle	قلعه خسروآباد	Khosrowabad	Qajar dynasty	
Kharanaq Castle	قلعه خرانق	Kharanaq		
Kol Hassan Sabbah castle	قلعه کل حسن صباح	Sarbisheh County	Nizari Ismaili state	
Kol Kharabeh castle	قلعه کل خرابه	Urmia County	1st millennium BC	
Kuchar castle	قلعه کوچار	Alborz County	Historical periods after Islam	
Kuhij castle	قلعه کوهیج	Bastak County	Safavid dynasty	
Kuh Shakhen castle	قلعه کوه شاخن	Birjand County	Seljuk Empire	
Kuh Qaen castle	قلعه کوه قائن	Qaen	Nizari Ismaili state	
Kuh Zardan castle	قلعه کوه زردان	Zirkuh County	Nizari Ismaili state	
Kuran castle	قلعه کوران	Andimeshk County	Safavid dynasty	
Khvor castle	قلعه خور	Khvor	Safavid dynasty	
Kohneh Castle, Agdash	قلعه کهنه	Esfarayen County	Historical periods after Islam	
Kohneh Castle, Ardein	قلعه کهنه	Esfarayen County	Seljuk Empire and Safavid Empire	
Kohneh Castle, Guren	قلعه کهنه	Esfarayen County	Middle Ages Historical periods after Islam	
Kohneh Castle, Jafarabad	قلعه کهنه	Eqlid County	Prehistoric times of ancient Iran	
Kohneh Castle, Nasrabad	قلعه کهنه	Esfarayen County	Late Centuries Historical Periods of Islam	
Kohneh Castle, Nuk	قلعه کهنه	Esfarayen County		
Kohneh Castle, Kariz Dar	قلعه کهنه	Esfarayen County	Middle Ages Historical periods after Islam	
Kohneh castle, Shaab Jereh	قلعه کهنه	Shaab Jereh	Safavid dynasty	
Kohneh Castle, Zendeh Jan	قلعه كهنه	Kashmar	1st millennium	
Kohneh Qal'eh, Meshginshahr	کهنه‌قلعه	Meshginshahr	Sasanian Empire	
Kohneh Qal'eh, Zafaraniyeh	کهنه‌قلعه	Zafaraniyeh	Qajar dynasty	
Kong Portuguese castle	قلعه پرتقالیهای کنگ	Bandar Lengeh County	Safavid dynasty	
Kolm castle	قلعه کلم	Badreh County	Medes	
Kondor castle	قلعه کندر	Kondor		
Kordasht castle	قلعه کردشت	Kordasht	Qajar dynasty	

=== L ===
Name	Persian name	Location	Founder and Era	Picture
Laft castle	قلعه لافت	Qeshm County	Qajar dynasty	
Larak castle	قلعه لارک	Larak Island	Safavid dynasty	
Lambsar Castle	دژ لمسر	Qazvin	Sasanian Empire	
Leshtan castle	قلعه لشتان	Bandar Lengeh County	Ninth century AH	
Lawajik castle	قلعه لواجیک	Buin Zahra County	Early centuries of historical periods after Islam	
Lisar castle	قلعه لیسار	Lisar	Seljuk Empire	

=== M ===
Name	Persian name	Location	Founder and Era	Picture
Machi castle	قلعه مچی	Hamun County	Safavid dynasty	
Mahtabi castle	دژ مهتابی	Behbahan County	Sasanian Empire	
Malek Bahman Castle	قلعه ملک بهمن	Shahandasht	Paduspanids	
Malekabad Zakht castle	قلعه ملک‌آباد زاخت	Anbarabad County	Seljuk Empire	
Mansur Kuh castle	قلعه منصور کوه	Damghan County	Nizari Ismaili state	
Manujan castle	قلعه منوجان	Manujan County		
Markuh Castle	قلعه مارکو	Ramsar County		
Marvast castle	قلعه مروست	Marvast	Historical periods after Islam	
Maryam Castle	قلعه مریم	Sarpol-e Zahab County	Sasanian Empire	
Masen castle	قلعه ماسن	Birjand County	Safavid dynasty and Qajar dynasty	
Maymun-Diz	میمون‌دژ	disputed; near Alamut Castle		
Mazayjan castle	قلعه مزایجان	Zarrin Dasht County		
Mehr Ali Farsi castle	قلعه مهر علی فارسی	Eqlid County	Prehistoric times of ancient Iran	
Mehrjerd castle	قلعه مهرجرد	Meybod County	Afsharid dynasty and Zand dynasty	
Mehrnegar castle	قلعه مهرنگار	Damghan County	Historical periods after Islam	
Meimoon Ghal'eh	میمون قلعه	Qazvin	Sasanian Empire	
Milajerd castle	قلعه میلاجرد	Komijan County	Historical periods after Islam	
Mikal castle	قلعه میکال	Torshiz		
Mir Ghulam Hashemi castle	قلعه میرغلام هاشمی	Darreh Shahr County	Pahlavi dynasty	
Moghuyeh castle	قلعه مغویه	Bandar Lengeh County	Qajar dynasty	
Molk Kioumars castle	قلعه ملک کیومرث	Garmsar County	Historical periods after Islam	
Mojahedabad castle	قلعه مجاهد آباد	Torshiz		
Mount Khajeh	کوه خواجه	Zabol	Sasanian Empire	
Mozaffarabad castle	قلعه مظفرآباد	Qomrud	Qajar dynasty	
Murchan castle	قلعه مورچان	Aran va Bidgol County	Buyid dynasty	

=== N ===
Name	Persian name	Location	Founder and Era	Picture
Nahavand Castle	قلعه نهاوند	Nahavand	Sasanian Empire	
Nakam castle	قلعه ناکام	Aligudarz County	Qajar dynasty	
Naryn Castle, Ardabil	نارین قلعه	Ardabil		
Naryn Castle, Meybod	نارین‌قلعه	Meybod	Sasanian Empire	
Naryn Castle, Nain	نارین قلعه	Nain, Iran	Parthian Empire	
Naryn Castle, Sardrud	نارین قلعه	Sardrud	1st millennium BC	
Nameq Castle	قلعه نامق	Nameq	Before the Mongol conquest	
Navader castle	قلعه نوادر	Abhar County	Early centuries of historical periods after Islam	
Naseri Castle	قلعه ناصری	Iranshahr	Qajar dynasty	
Nasori castle	قلعه نصوری	Bandar Siraf	Qajar dynasty	
Nehbandan Citadel	قلعه نهبندان	Nehbandan	Parthian Empire	
Nik Shahr castle	قلعه نیکشهر	Nik Shahr	Parthian Empire	
Noushijan	نوشیجان	Malayer	Medes	
Nowferest castle	قلعه نوفرست	Birjand County	3rd and 4th centuries AH until the Safavid dynasty	
Nughab castle	قلعه نوغاب	Birjand County	12th to 14th centuries AH	

=== O ===
Name	Persian name	Location	Founder and Era	Picture
Owlad castle	قلعه اولاد	Savadkuh County	Sasanian Empire	
Owltan castle	قلعه اولتان	Parsabad	Parthian Empire	

=== P ===
Name	Persian name	Location	Founder and Era	Picture
Pa Deh castle	قلعه پاده	Pa Deh, Semnan		
Pahlavan Badi castle	قلعه پهلوان بادی	Taft County	Ancient Persia	
Palace of Ardashir	کاخ اردشیر بابکان	Firuzabad, Fars	Sasanian Empire	
Palangan castle	قلعه پلنگان	Behshahr County	Historical periods after Islam	
Panj Berar Murmuri castle	قلعه پنج برار مور موری	Abdanan County		
Paqala Hezarani castle	قلعه پاقلاع هزارانی	Ilam County	Sasanian Empire	
Pirouz Got castle	قلعه پیروز گت	Tis, Iran	Parthian Empire and Sasanian Empire	
Parvizeh Evaz castle	قلعه پرویزه اوز	Evaz County	Sasanian Empire	
Posht Qaleh Abdanan castle	قلعه پشت قلعه آبدانان	Abdanan County	Sasanian Empire	
Posht Qaleh Chavar	پشت قلعه چوار	Ilam County	Historical periods after Islam	
Poshtab Castle	قلعه پشتاب	Ahar County	Before the Medes	
Poulad Castle	قلعه پولاد	Nur County	Seljuq dynasty	
Pur Ashraf Sheykh Makan castle	قلعه پور اشرف شیخ مکان	Darreh Shahr County	1335 AH	
Puskan castle	قلعه پوسکان	Kazerun County	Sasanian Empire	

=== Q ===
Name	Persian name	Location	Founder and Era	Picture
Qadamgah castle	قلعه قدمگاه	Nehbandan County	Afsharid dynasty	
Qadimi castle	قلعه قدیمی	Bijar County	Qajar dynasty and Pahlavi dynasty	
Qahqah castle	قلعه قهقه	Ravar County	Sasanian Empire	
Qahqaheh Castle	قلعه قهقهه	Meshginshahr	Safavid dynasty	
Qarloq castle	قلعه قارلق	Bojnord County	Middle Ages Historical periods after Islam	
Qala Qiran castle	قلعه قلا قیران	Ilam County	Parthian Empire	
Qala Qureh castle	قلعه قلا قوره	Bijar County		
Qalat Khawari castle	قلعه قلات خواری	Arsanjan County	Sasanian Empire	
Qal'eh Bozi	قلعه بزی	Mobarakeh County	Sasanian Empire	
Qal'eh Dokhtar	قلعه دختر	Firuzabad, Fars	Sasanian Empire	
Qal'eh Dokhtar, Asiab	قلعه دختر	Birjand County	7th to 10th centuries AH	
Qal'eh Dokhtar, Bileh Savar	قلعه دختر	Bileh Savar County	1st millennium BC	
Qal'eh Dokhtar, Bishapur	قلعه دختر	Kazerun County	Sasanian Empire	
Qal'eh Dokhtar, Doruneh	قلعه دختر	Bardaskan County	6th to 9th centuries AH	
Qal'eh Dokhtar, Ferdows	قلعه دختر	Ferdows	Nizari Ismaili state	
Qal'eh Dokhtar, Estahban	قلعه دختر	Estahban County	Middle Ages Historical periods after Islam	
Qal'eh Dokhtar, Khooshab	قلعه دختر	Khooshab	6th to 8th centuries AH	
Qal'eh Dokhtar, Khosrowshah	قلعه دختر	Khosrowshah	Before Islam	
Qal'eh Dokhtar, Kuhsorkh	قلعه دختر	Kuhsorkh County	Nizari Ismaili state	
Qal'eh Dokhtar, Kerman	قلعه دختر	Kerman	Medes	
Qal'eh Dokhtar, Mark	قلعه دختر	Birjand County	7th to 10th centuries AH	
Qal'eh Dokhtar, Mianeh	قلعه دختر	Mianeh County	1st millennium BC	
Qal'eh Dokhtar, Qez Qaleh	قلعه دختر	Mianeh County	1st millennium BC	
Qal'eh Dokhtar, Qom	قلعه دختر	Qom County	Sasanian Empire	
Qal'eh Dokhtar, Shurab	قلعه دختر	Gonabad County	Sasanian Empire	
Qal'eh Dokhtar, Saveh	قلعه دختر	Saveh	Sasanian Empire	
Qal'eh Dokhtar II	قلعه دختر دوم	Kerman	Over two thousand years	
Qal'eh Kuh of Ferdows	قلعه کوه فردوس	Ferdows	Unknown	
Qala Castle, Ark	قلعه قلاع	Khusf County	Seljuk Empire	
Qala Castle, Chahkand	قلعه قلاع	Sarbisheh County	Seljuk Empire	
Qala Castle, Nowzad	قلعه قلاع	Darmian County	Nizari Ismaili state	
Qala Castle, Mud	قلعه قلاع	Sarbisheh County	Nizari Ismaili state	
Qala Castle, Sarayan	قلعه قلاع	Sarayan County	Nizari Ismaili state	
Qala Castle, Shadan	قلعه قلاع	Khusf County	Seljuk Empire	
Qala Castle Nu	قلعه قلا نو	Garmsar County	Parthian Empire	
Qalat Castle, Bastak	قلعه قلات	Bastak County		
Qalat Castle, Kavar	قلعه قلات	Shiraz County	Sasanian Empire	
Qalat Castle, Qir and Karzin	قلعه قلات	Qir and Karzin County	Sasanian Empire	
Qalat Jenah Castle	قلعه قلات جناح	Bastak County		
Qameshlu castle	قلعه قمشلو	Tiran and Karvan County	Qajar dynasty	
Qari Daqu castle	قلعه قری داغو	Buin Zahra County	Historical periods after Islam	
Qanj Ali Khan Afshar castle	قلعه غنجعلیخان افشار	Baft County	Safavid dynasty	
Qazlar Qaleh	قزلر قلعه	Esfarayen County	Achaemenid Empire and Parthian Empire	
Qermez castle	قلعه قرمز	Cheshmeh Shur	Qajar dynasty	
Qasem Khan castle	قلعه قاسم خان	Esfarayen County	Middle Ages and Late Historical Periods of Islam	
Qelich castle	قلعه قلیچ	Esfarayen County	Achaemenid Empire and Parthian Empire	
Qeshm Castle	قلعه قشم	Qeshm Island	Safavid dynasty	
Qez Qaleh Si, Abadeh	قزقلعه‌سی	Abadeh County	Historical periods after Islam	
Qez Qaleh Si, Bileh Savar	قزقلعه‌سی	Bileh Savar County	Sasanian Empire	
Qezlar Qaleh Si castle	قزلار قلعه سی	Zanjan County	6th and 7th centuries AH	
Qiz Castle, Jamkaran	قیزقلعه	Qom County	Sasanian Empire	
Qiz Castle, Khoy	قیزقلعه	Khoy County	Urartu	
Qiz Castle, Osku	قیزقلعه	Osku County	rehistoric times of ancient Iran	
Qiz Castle Daghi	قیزقلعه	Mianeh County	Parthian Empire and Sasanian Empire	
Qiz Castle Kondeskuh	قیزقلعه	Minudasht County	Historical periods after Islam	
Qiz Castle Si	قیزقلعه	Mahneshan County	Historical periods after Islam	
Qizlar Qaleh Si castle	قلعه قیزلارقلعه‌سی	Abhar County	Ilkhanate	
Qomchoqay castle	قلعه قمچقای	Qomchoqay	3rd millennium BC	
Qomrud castle	قلعه قمرود	Qomrud	Safavid dynasty	
Qoshun castle	قلعه قشون	Bojnord County	Middle Ages Historical periods after Islam	
Qurtan castle	قلعه قورتان	Qurtan	Sasanian Empire	
Qujileh castle	قلعه قوجیله	Baneh County		
Qunakh Qiran castle	قلعه قوناخ قیران	Ardabil County	Sasanian Empire	

=== R ===
Name	Persian name	Location	Founder and Era	Picture
Rahmatabad castle	قلعه رحمت‌آباد	Hamidiya	Historical periods after Islam	
Rahmanniyeh castle	قلعه رحمانیه	Rahmanniyeh		
Rashkan Castle	دژ رشکان	Ray, Iran	Parthian Empire	
Ramrud castle	قلعه رامرود	Hamun County	Timurid Empire	
Rayen Castle	ارگ راین	Rayen	Sasanian Empire	
Raqqeh castle	قلعه رقه	Boshruyeh County	Qajar dynasty	
Razeh castle	قلعه رزه	Andimeshk County	Safavid dynasty	
Remuk castle	قلعه رموک	Kerman County	Historical periods after Islam	
Reshkuiyeh castle	قلعه رشکوئیه	Taft County	Qajar dynasty	
Rey Castle	باروی ری	Ray, Iran	Medes	
Razliq castle	قلعه رازلیق	Sarab County	1st millennium BC	
Rig castle	قلعه ریگ	Kashmar	Seljuq dynasty	
Robat castle	قلعه رباط	Abarkuh	Safavid dynasty	
Roknabad castle	قلعه رکن‌آباد	Abarkuh County	Qajar dynasty	
Rostam castle	قلعه رستم	Hamun County	Safavid dynasty	
Rostam Castle, Khusf	قلعه رستم	Khusf County	Sasanian Empire	
Rudbar castle	قلعه رودبار	Bastak County	Qajar dynast	
Rudkhan Castle	قلعه رودخان	Fuman County	Sasanian Empire	
Rumyan castle	قلعه رومیان	Nasirabad		

=== S ===
Name	Persian name	Location	Founder and Era	Picture
S.P.R	اس‌پی‌آر	Neyriz County	Historical periods after Islam	
Saheb Ekhtiarieh castle	قلعه صاحب اختیاریه	Asadabad County	Qajar dynasty	
Sarmaj castle	قلعه سرماج	Harsin County	Sasanian Empire	
Samabad castle	قلعه سام‌آباد	Qomrud	Qajar dynasty	
Sang castle	قلعه سنگ	Sirjan County	Sasanian Empire	
Sar Firuzabad castle	قلعه سر فیروزآباد	Eslamabad-e Gharb County	Sasanian Empire	
Sar Tapeh castle	قلعه سرتپه	Bandar-e Gaz County		
Sar Yazd Fortress	قلعه سریزد	Sar Yazd	Sasanian Empire	
Saru Castles	قلعه سارو	Semnan	Kayanian dynasty	
Sarvestan Palace	کاخ سروستان	Sarvestan	Sasanian Empire	
Sarv-e Jahan castle	قلعه سروجهان	Abhar County	Ilkhanate and Seljuk Empire	
Sarv-e Olya castle	قلعه سروعلیا	Ardakan County	Late Islamic period	
Sarv-e Sofla castle	قلعه سرو سفلی	Ardakan County	Qajar dynasty	
Salavatabad castle	قلعه صلوات‌آباد	Bijar County	Safavid dynasty	
Sangar castle	قلعه سنگر	Esfarayen County	Parthian Empire and Sasanian Empire	
Sam Castle	قلعه سام	Chardavol County	Late Parthian Empire	
Sam Castle	قلعه سام	Hamun County	Parthian Empire	
Sasan castle	قلعه ساسان	Qazvin County	Historical periods after Islam.	
Sefid castle, Nadushan	قلعه سفید	Meybod County	Afsharid dynasty	
Seh Kohye castle	قلعه سه کوهه	Zabol County	Qajar dynasty	
School Castle 1	قلعه مدرسه ۱	Izeh County	Safavid dynasty	
Selasal castle	قلعه سلاسل	Shushtar	Achaemenid Empire	
Sen Sarud castle	قلعه سن سارود	Marand County	7th or 8th century AH	
Semiran castle	قلعه سمیران	Bahramabad, Qazvin	Sasanian Empire	
Semoran castle	قلعه سموران	Anbarabad County	Seljuk Empire	
Shah Neshin castle	قلعه شاه‌نشین	Larestan County	Sasanian Empire	
Shah Neshin Asiab Sar castle	قلعه شاه نشین آسیاب سر	Behshahr County	Early centuries of historical periods after Islam.	
Shah Neshin Gorj castle	قلعه شاه نشین گورج	Amlash County	Historical periods after Islam	
Shahdiz	قلعه شاهدژ	Nehbandan County	Seljuq dynasty	
Shafiabad castle	قلعه شفیع‌آباد	Shafiabad	Qajar dynasty	
Shargeh Castle	قلعه شرگه	Baneh County		
Sherbit castle	قلعه شربیت	Ahar County	Parthian Empire	
Shavvaz castle	قلعه شواز	Shavvaz, Yazd	Sasanian Empire	
Sheikh Makan Fort	قلعه شیخ مکان	Sheykh Makan	Sasanian Empire	
Shemiran castle	قلعه شمیران	Eyvan County	Sasanian Empire	
Shian castle	قلعه شیان	Eslamabad-e Gharb County	Prehistoric times of ancient Iran	
Shirkuh castle	قلعه شیرکوه	Qazvin County	Sasanian Empire	
Shir Qal'eh	شیر قلعه	Mehdishahr County	Parthian Empire	
Shindan Castle	قلعه شیندان	Astara County	Before the advent of Islam	
Simakan castle	قلعه سیمکان	Bavanat County	Qajar dynasty	
Shojaabad Castles	قلعه‌های شجاع آباد	Aran va Bidgol County	Qajar dynasty	
Shush Castle	قلعه شوش	Susa	Qajar dynasty	
Sib and Suran castle	قلعه سیب سوران	Sib and Suran County	Qajar dynasty	
Siba Castle	قلعه سیبه	Bastak County	Sasanian Empire	
Soltaniyeh castle	قلعه سلطانیه	Soltaniyeh	1st millennium BC	
Sonni castle	قلعه سنی	Abarkuh County	Qajar dynasty	
Surin castle	قلعه سورین	Baneh County		

=== T ===
Name	Persian name	Location	Founder and Era	Picture
Tabas-e Mesina Castle	قلعه طبس مسینا	Tabas-e Masina	Parthian Empire	
Tabreh Castle	دژ طبره	Isfahan County	Sasanian Empire	
Tarq Castle	قلعه طرق	Tarq, Isfahan	Parthian Empire	
Tak Aghaj Castle	قلعه تک آغاج	Astara County	Seljuk Empire	
Takht-e Soleymān	تخت سلیمان	West Azerbaijan Province	Sasanian Empire	
Tang Lorun Castle	قلعه تنگ لرون	Bavanat County	Sasanian Empire	
Tawseelah Castle	قلعه توصیله	Kukherd	Sasanian Empire	
Tepe Sialk	تپه سیلک	Kashan	Proto-Elamite	
Timur Castle	قلعه تیمور	Zabol County	Timurid Empire	
Tis Castle	قلعه تیس	Tis	Safavid dynasty	
Tizak Castle	قلعه تیزک	Abarkuh County	Qajar dynasty	
Tut Castle	قلعه توت	Ilam		
Tutangi Meseh Castle	قلعه توتنگی مسه	Bavanat County	Sasanian Empire	
Tus Citadel	قلعه توس	Tafresh County	Sasanian Empire	
Tuzandejan Castle	قلعه توزندجان	Firuzeh County	Parthian Empire	

=== V ===
Name	Persian name	Location	Founder and Era	Picture
Valy Castle	قلعه والی	Ilam	Qajar dynasty	

=== Y ===
Name	Persian name	Location	Founder and Era
Yahn castle	قلعه یهن	Birjand County	Timurid Empire to Safavid dynasty
Yazdegerd castle, Zardeh	قلعه یزدگرد	Zardeh	Parthian Empire
Yengejeh castle	قلعه ینگجه	Ardabil County	Seljuk Empire

=== Z ===
Name	Persian name	Location	Founder and Era	Picture
Zahhak Castle	قلعه ضحاک	Arablu, East Azerbaijan	Parthian Empire	
Zar Bolagh castle	قلعه زاربلاغ	Aliabad, Qom	Medes	
Zard Castle	قلعه زرد	Damghan County	Historical periods after Islam	
Zardak Castle	قلعه زردک	Ardakan County	Qajar dynasty	
Zendan Castle	قلعه زندان	Deyr County	Sasanian Empire	
Ziaratgah Castle	قلعه زیارتگاه	Ziaratgah	Qajar dynasty	
Zibad Castle	قلعه زیبد	Zibad		
Ziwiyeh	تپه قلعه زیویه	Ziviyeh	1st millennium BC	

== See also ==
- List of castles
- List of palaces in Iran
