= Yahn Castle =

Castle in South Khorasan Province, Iran

Yahn castle
- قلعه یهن

General information
- Type: Castle
- Location: Birjand County, Iran

Yahn castle (Persian: قلعه یهن) is a historical castle located in Birjand County in South Khorasan Province; the longevity of this fortress dates back to the Timurid Empire to Safavid dynasty.
