= Aliabad Castle, Pish Kuh =

Castle in Yazd Province, Iran

Aliabad Castle
- قلعه علی‌آباد

General information
- Type: Castle
- Location: Taft County, Iran

Aliabad Castle (Persian: قلعه علی‌آباد) is a historical castle located in Taft County in Yazd Province; the longevity of this fortress dates back to the Historical periods after Islam.
