= Bardestan Castle =

Castle in Bushehr Province, Iran

Bardestan castle
- قلعه بردستان
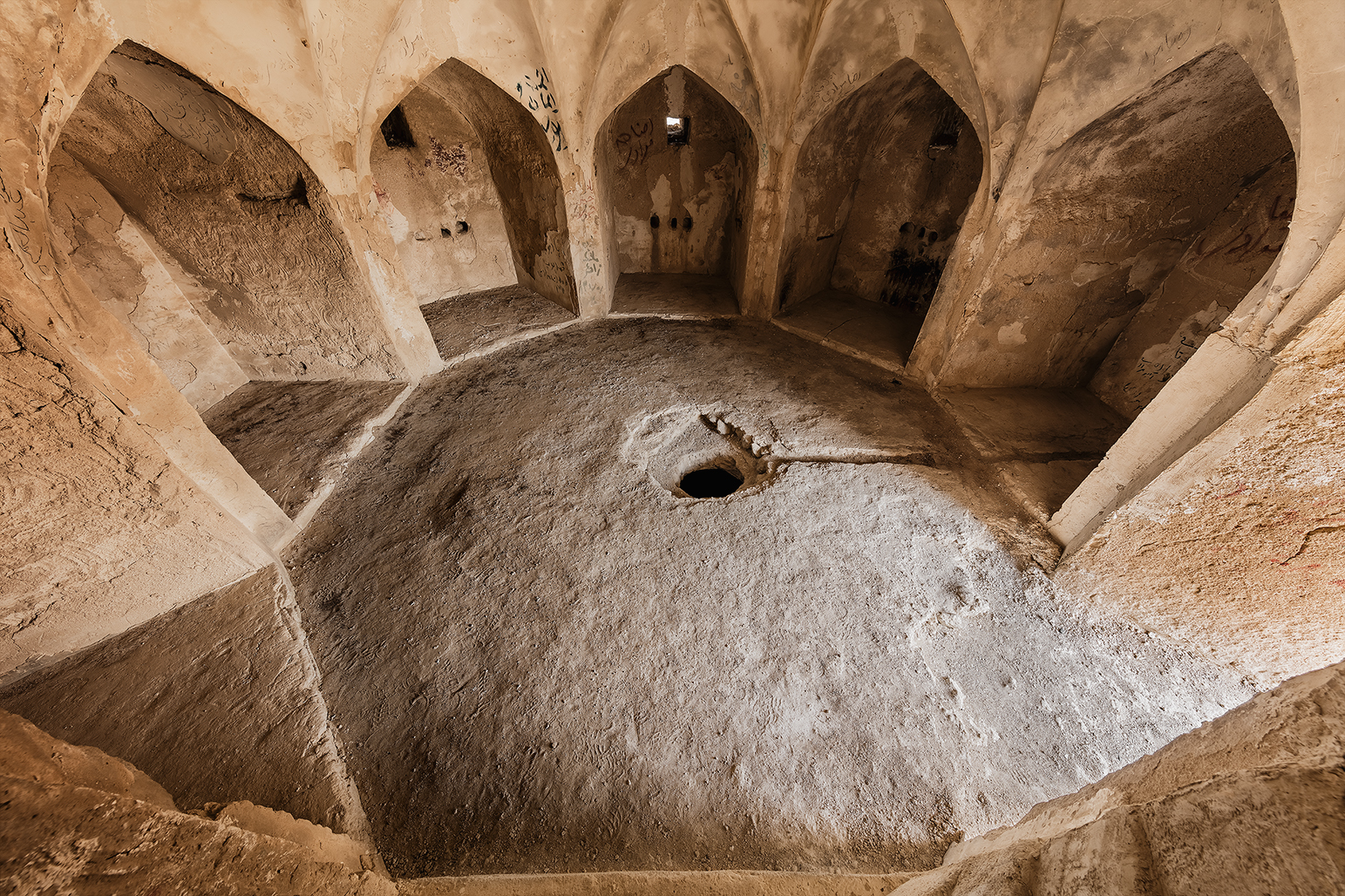
- Interactive map of the Bardestan castle area

General information
- Type: Castle
- Location: Deyr County, Iran
- Coordinates: 27.87331°N 51.96103°E

Bardestan castle (Persian: قلعه بردستان) is a historical castle located in Deyr County in Bushehr Province, The longevity of this fortress dates back to the Historical periods after Islam.
