= Azizabad Castle =

Castle in South Khorasan Province, Iran

Azizabad castle
- قلعه عزیزآباد

General information
- Type: Castle
- Location: Boshruyeh County, Iran

Azizabad castle (Persian: قلعه عزیزآباد) is a historical castle located in Boshruyeh County in South Khorasan Province, The longevity of this fortress dates back to the Qajar dynasty.
