= Allahabad Castle =

Castle in Yazd Province, Iran

Allahabad castle
- قلعه الله‌آباد

General information
- Type: Castle
- Location: Ardakan County, Iran

Allahabad castle (Persian: قلعه الله‌آباد) is a historical castle located in Ardakan County in Yazd Province, The longevity of this fortress dates back to the Safavid dynasty.
