= Tutangi Meseh Castle =

Castle in Fars province, Iran

Tutangi Meseh castle
- قلعه توتنگی مسه

General information
- Type: Castle
- Location: Bavanat County, Iran

Tutangi Meseh castle (Persian: قلعه توتنگی مسه) is a historical castle located in Bavanat County in Fars province, The longevity of this fortress dates back to the Sasanian Empire.
