= Chavar Qala Castle =

Castle in Ilam Province, Iran

Chavar Qala castle
- قلعه چوارقلا

General information
- Type: Castle
- Location: Ilam County, Iran

Chavar Qala castle (Persian: قلعه چوارقلا) is a historical castle located in Ilam County in Ilam Province.
