= Poulad Castle =

Castle in Mazandaran Province, Iran

- قلعه پولاد
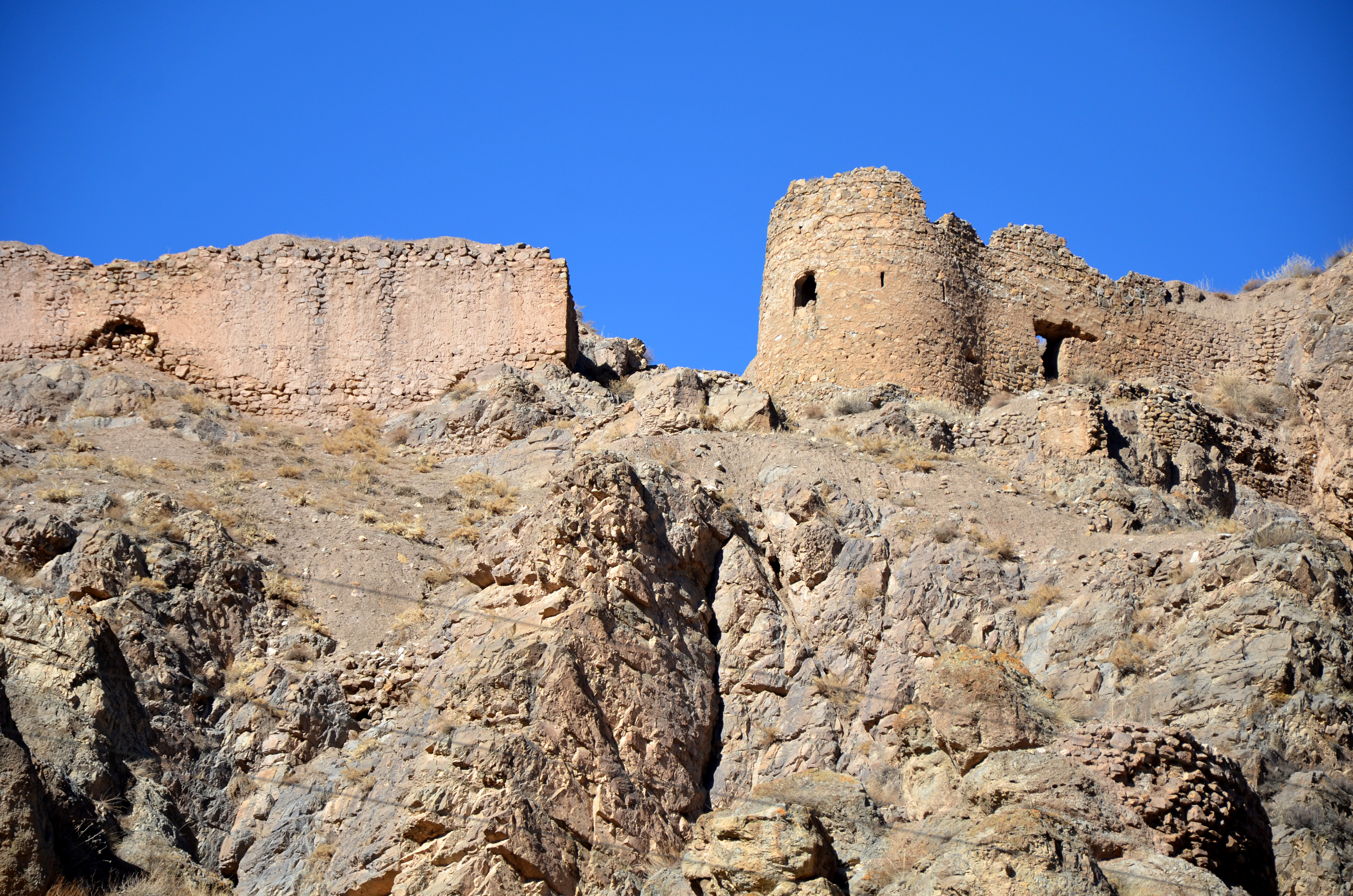
- Interactive map of the Poulad Castle area

General information
- Type: Castle
- Location: Nur County, Iran

Poulad Castle (Persian: قلعه پولاد) is a historical castle located in Nur County in Mazandaran Province, The longevity of this fortress dates back to the Seljuk dynasty.
