= Qalat Jenah Castle =

Castle in Hormozgan Province, Iran

- قلعه قلات جناح

General information
- Type: Castle
- Location: Bastak County, Iran

Qalat Jenah Castle (Persian: قلعه قلات جناح) is a historical castle located in Bastak County in Hormozgan Province, Iran.
