= Kani Now Castle =

Castle in Kurdistan Province, Iran

Kani Now castle
- قلعه کانی ناو

General information
- Type: Castle
- Location: Baneh County, Iran

Kani Now castle (Persian: قلعه کانی ناو) is a historical castle located in Baneh County in Kurdistan Province.
