= Babuk Castle =

Castle in South Khorasan Province, Iran

Babuk castle
- قلعه بابوک

General information
- Type: Castle
- Location: Birjand County, Iran

Babuk castle (Persian: قلعه بابوک) is a historical castle located in Birjand County in South Khorasan Province; the longevity of this fortress dates back to the Qajar dynasty.
