= Bardel Castle =

Castle in Khuzestan Province, Iran

Bardel castle
- قلعه بردل

General information
- Type: Castle
- Location: Andimeshk County, Iran

Bardel castle (Persian: قلعه بردل) is a historical castle located in Andimeshk County in Khuzestan Province. The longevity of this fortress dates back to the Safavid dynasty.
