= Azna Castle =

Castle in Lorestan Province, Iran

Azna castle
- قلعه ازنا

General information
- Type: Castle
- Location: Azna County, Iran

Azna castle (Persian: قلعه ازنا) is a historical castle located in Azna County in Lorestan Province, The longevity of this fortress dates back to the Prehistoric times of ancient Iran.
