= Deh Asgar Castle =

Castle in Yazd Province, Iran

Deh Asgar castle
- قلعه ده عسگر

General information
- Type: Castle
- Location: Behabad County, Iran

Deh Asgar castle (Persian: قلعه ده عسگر) is a historical castle located in Behabad County in Yazd Province, The longevity of this fortress dates back to the Qajar dynasty.
