= Bar Bar Castle =

Castle in Ardabil Province, Iran

Bar Bar castle
- قلعه بربر
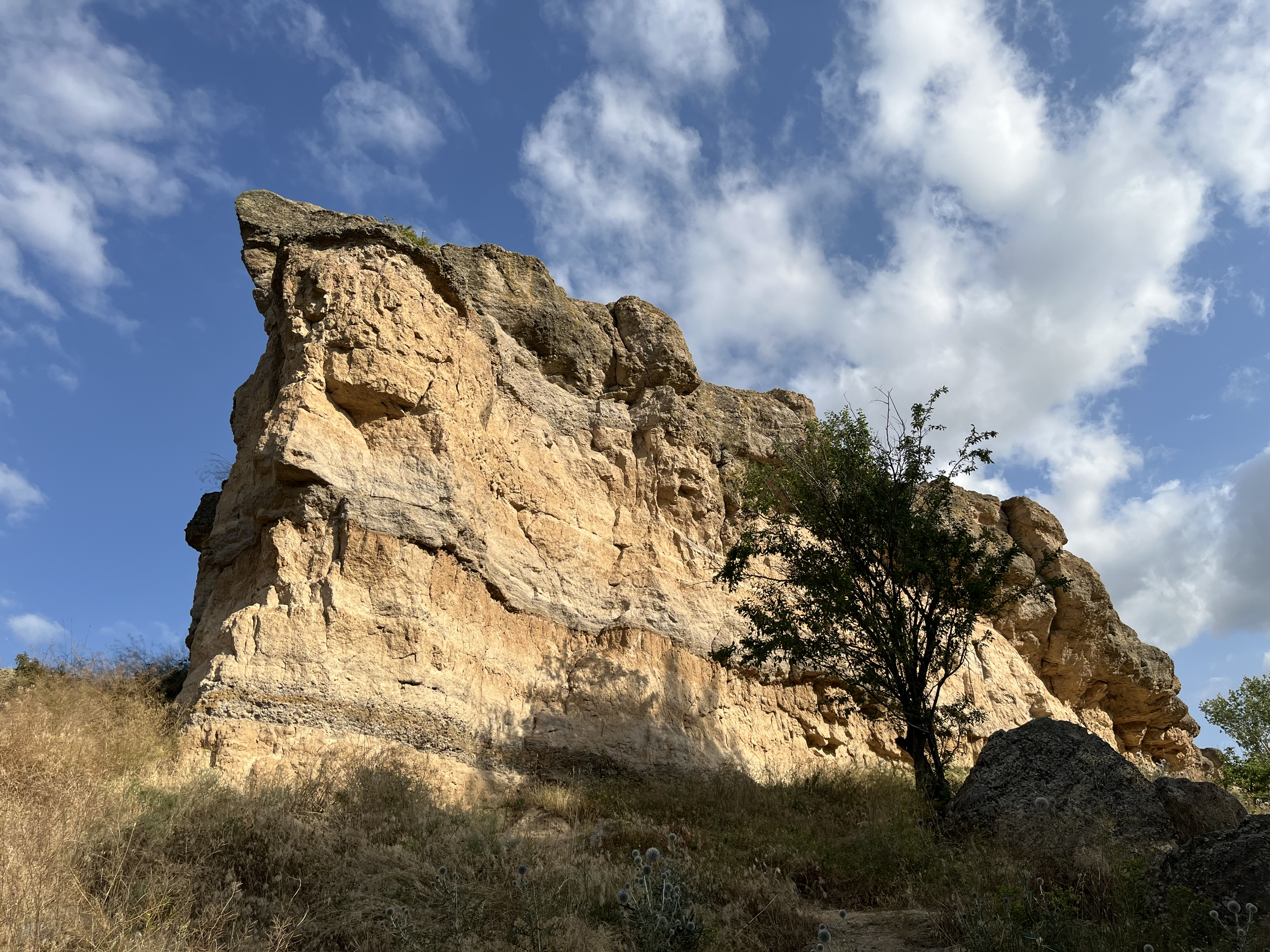

- Location within Iran

General information
- Type: Castle
- Location: Meshgin Shahr County, Iran
- Coordinates: 38.4765°N 47.8622°E

Bar Bar castle (Persian: قلعه بربر) is a historical castle located in Meshgin Shahr County in Ardabil Province, The longevity of this fortress dates back to the 2nd and 3rd centuries AH.

== Photo gallery ==
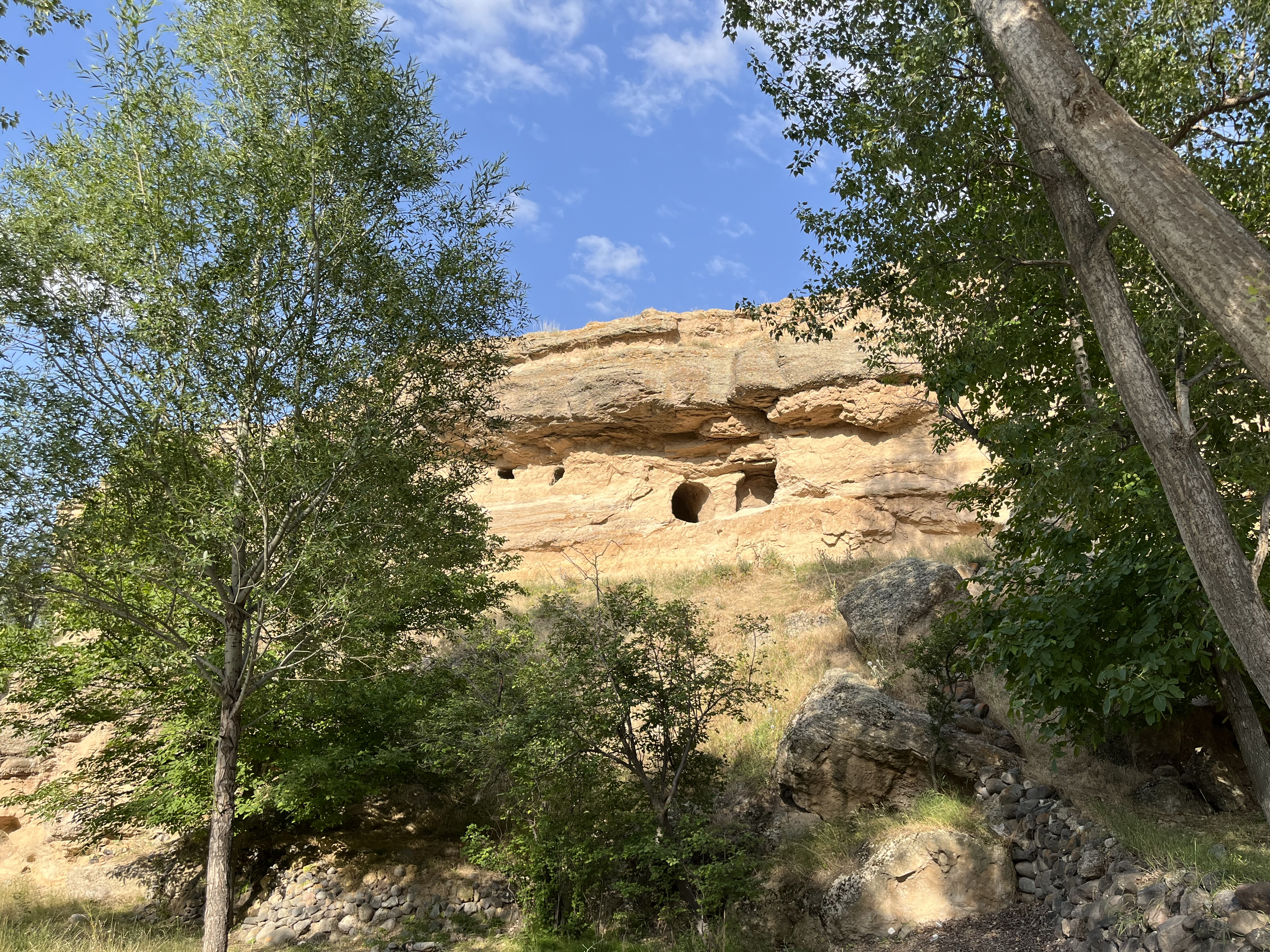

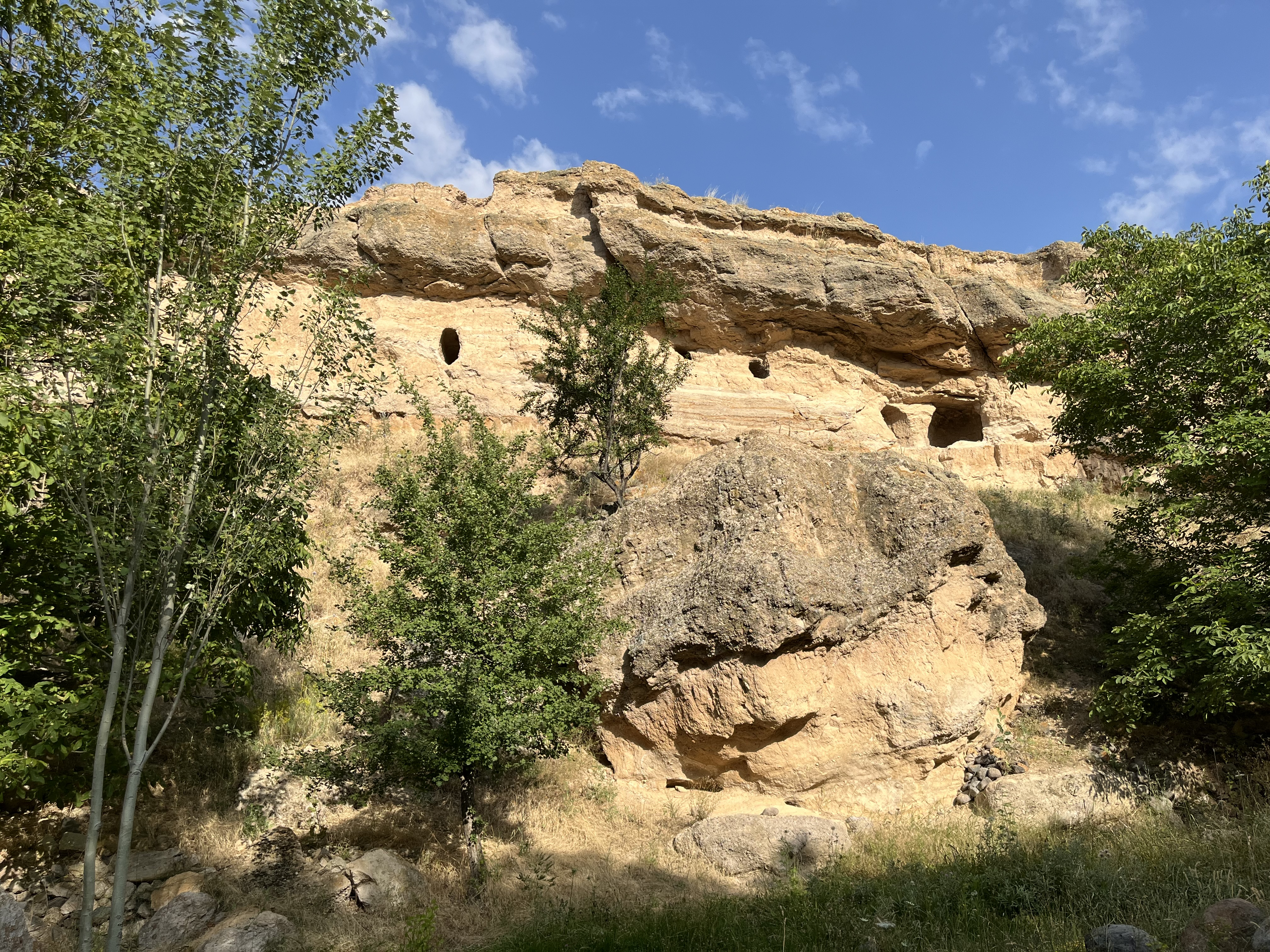

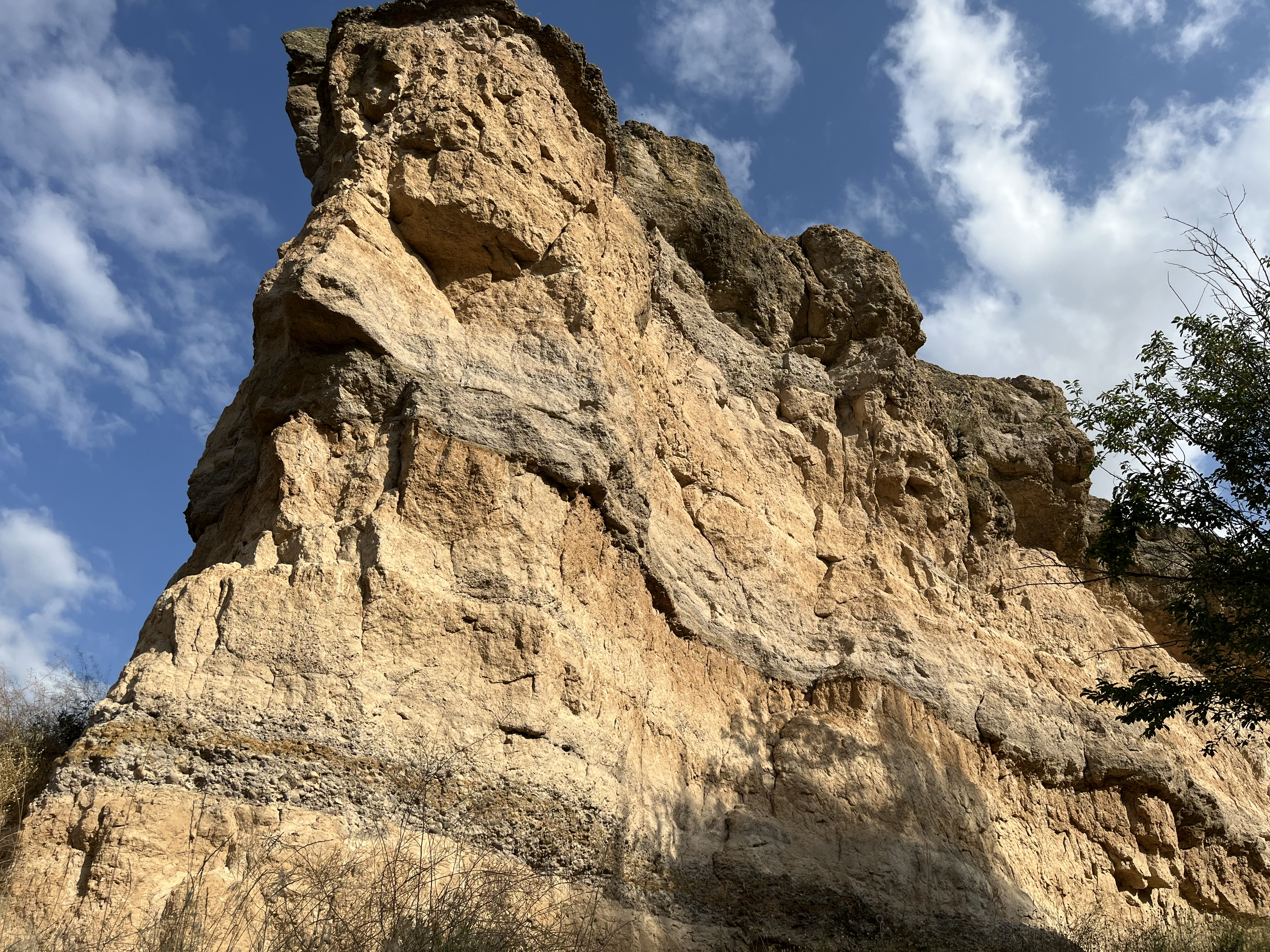

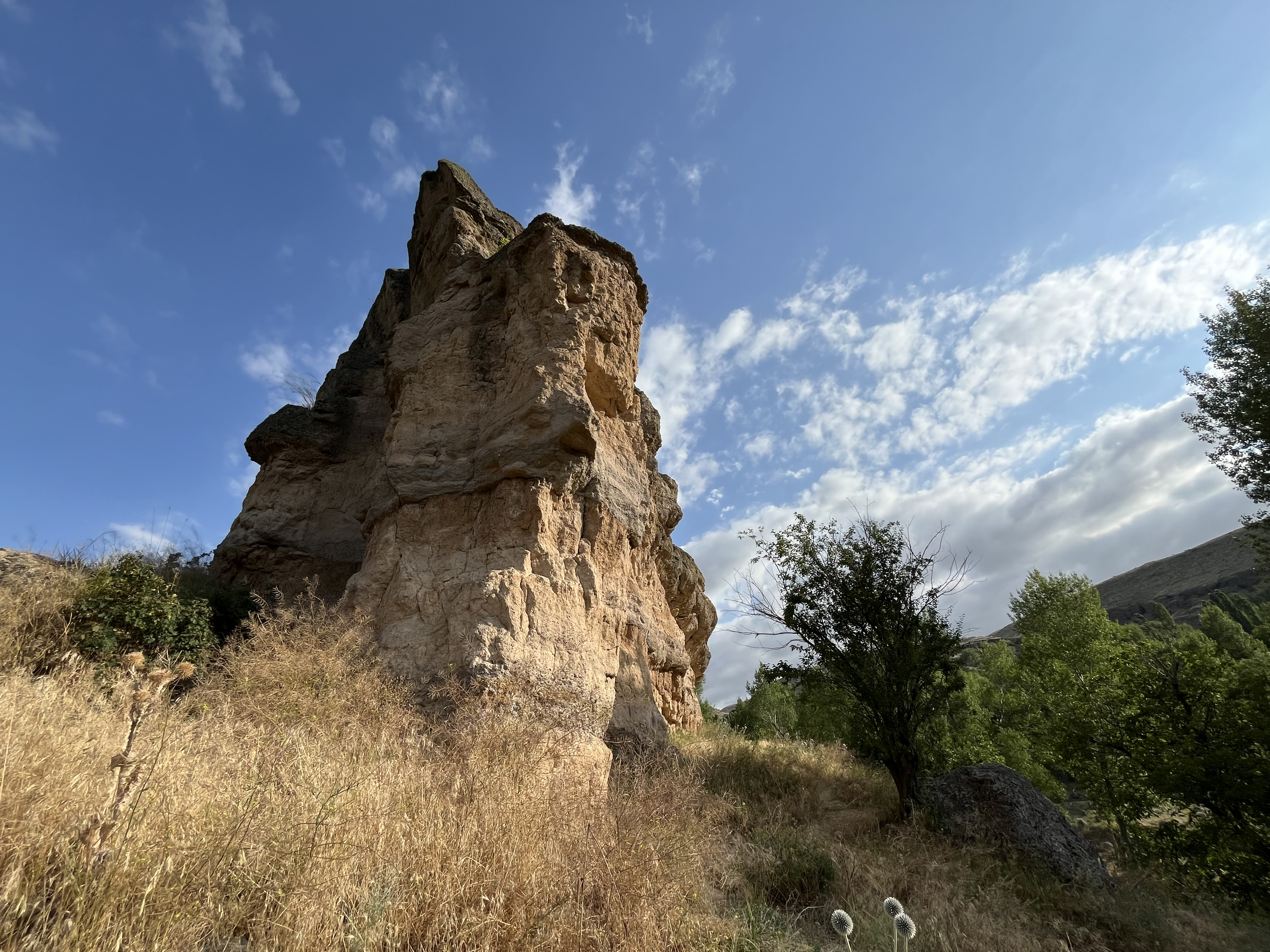

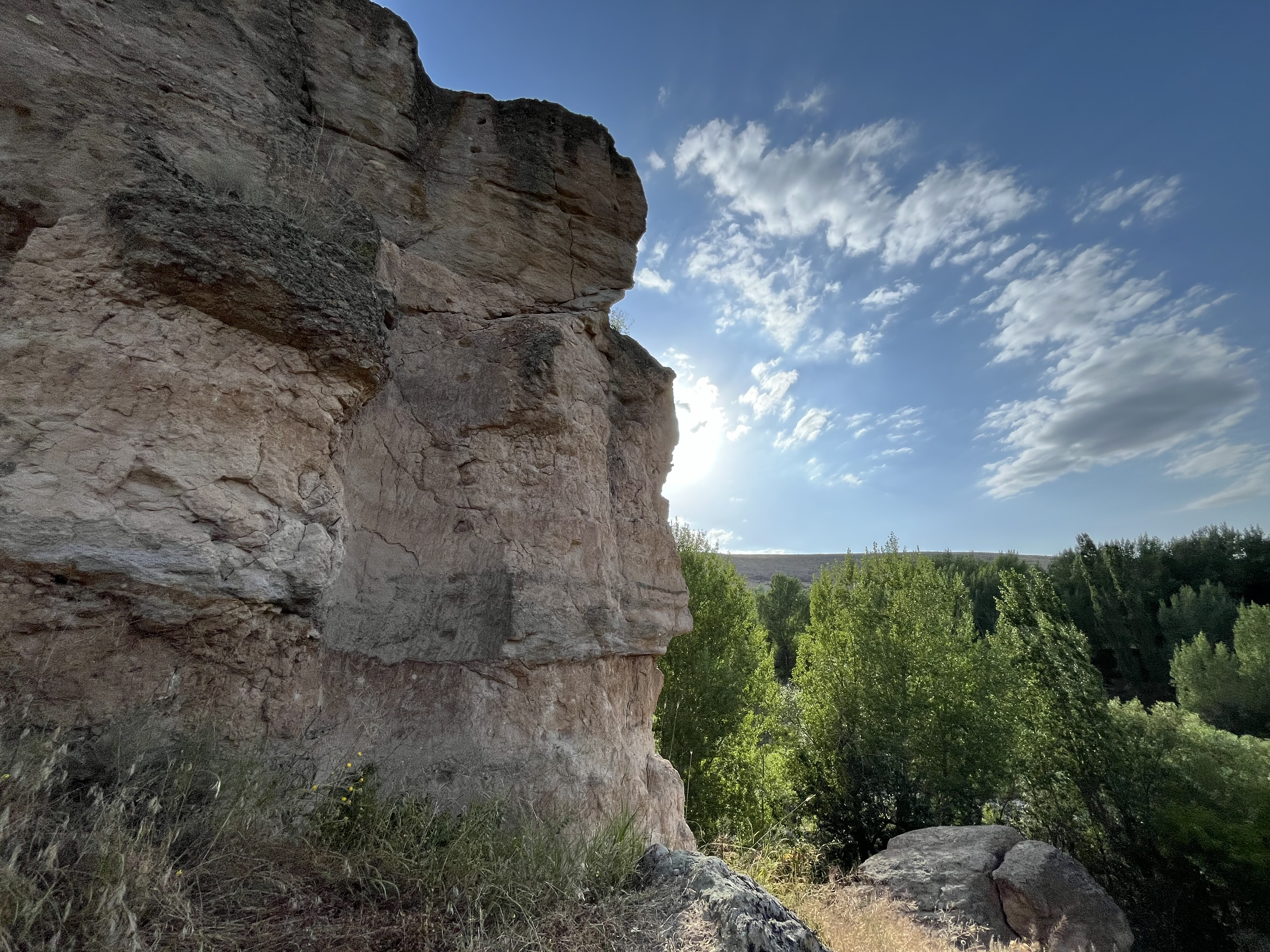

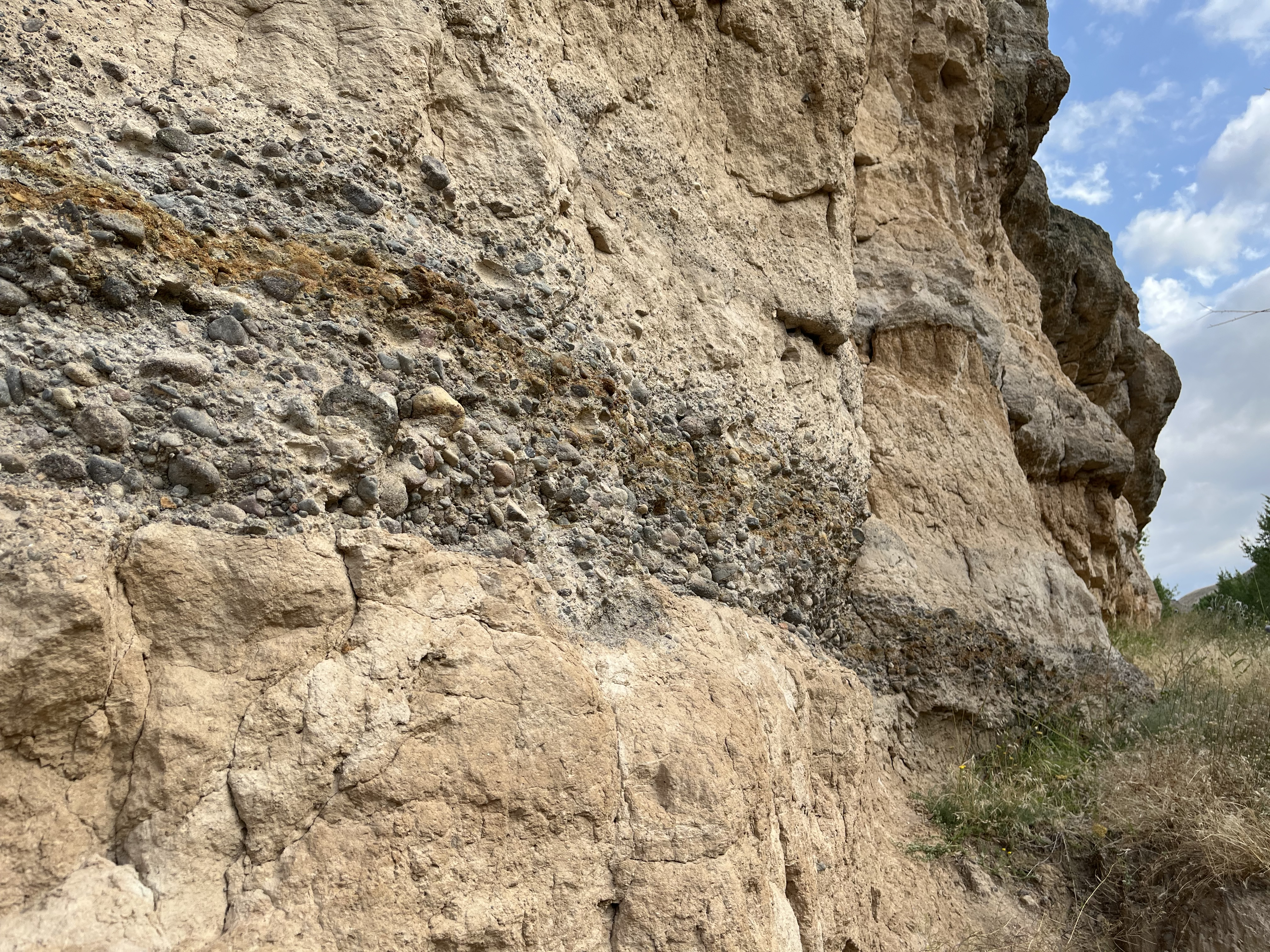

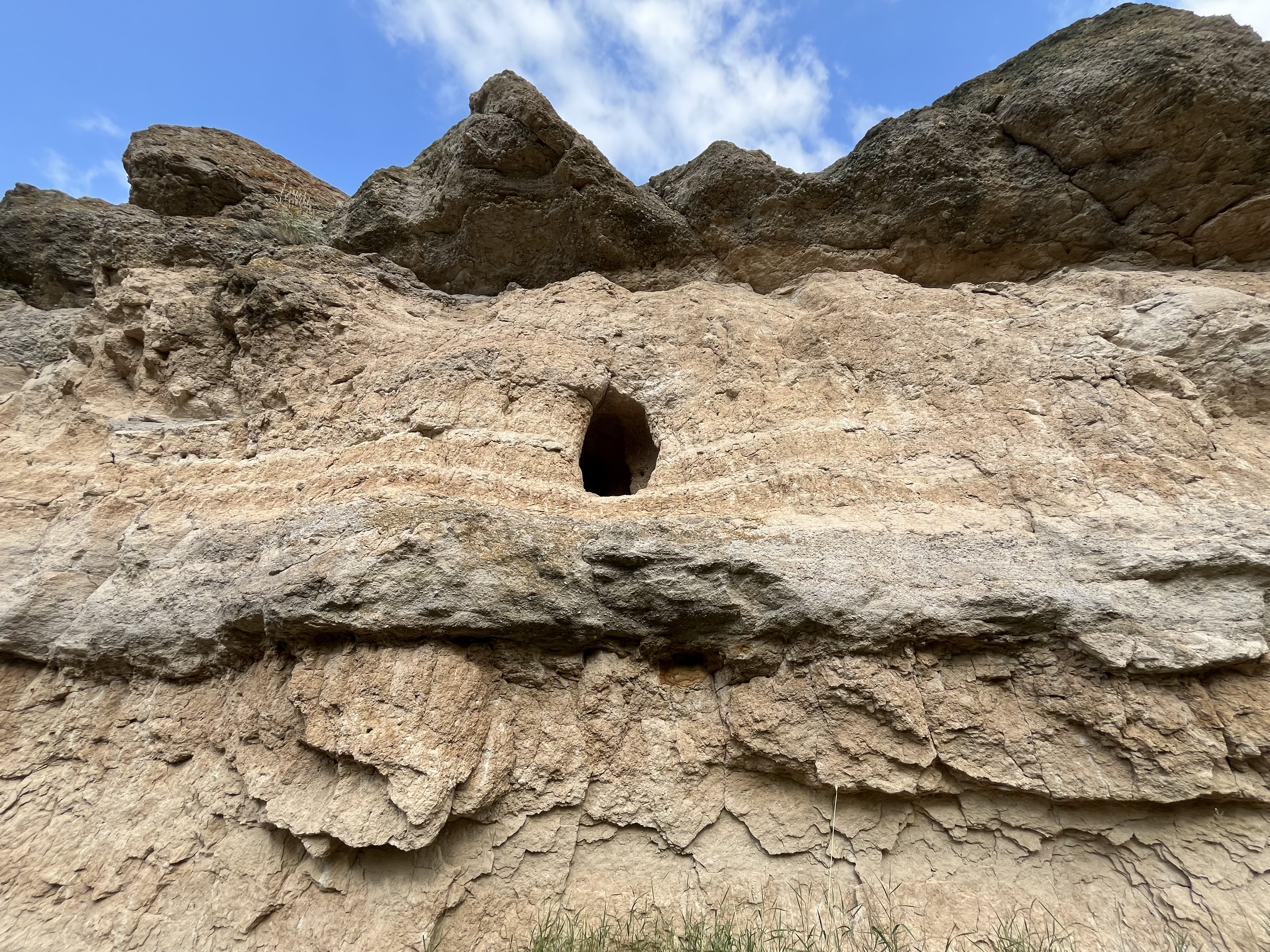

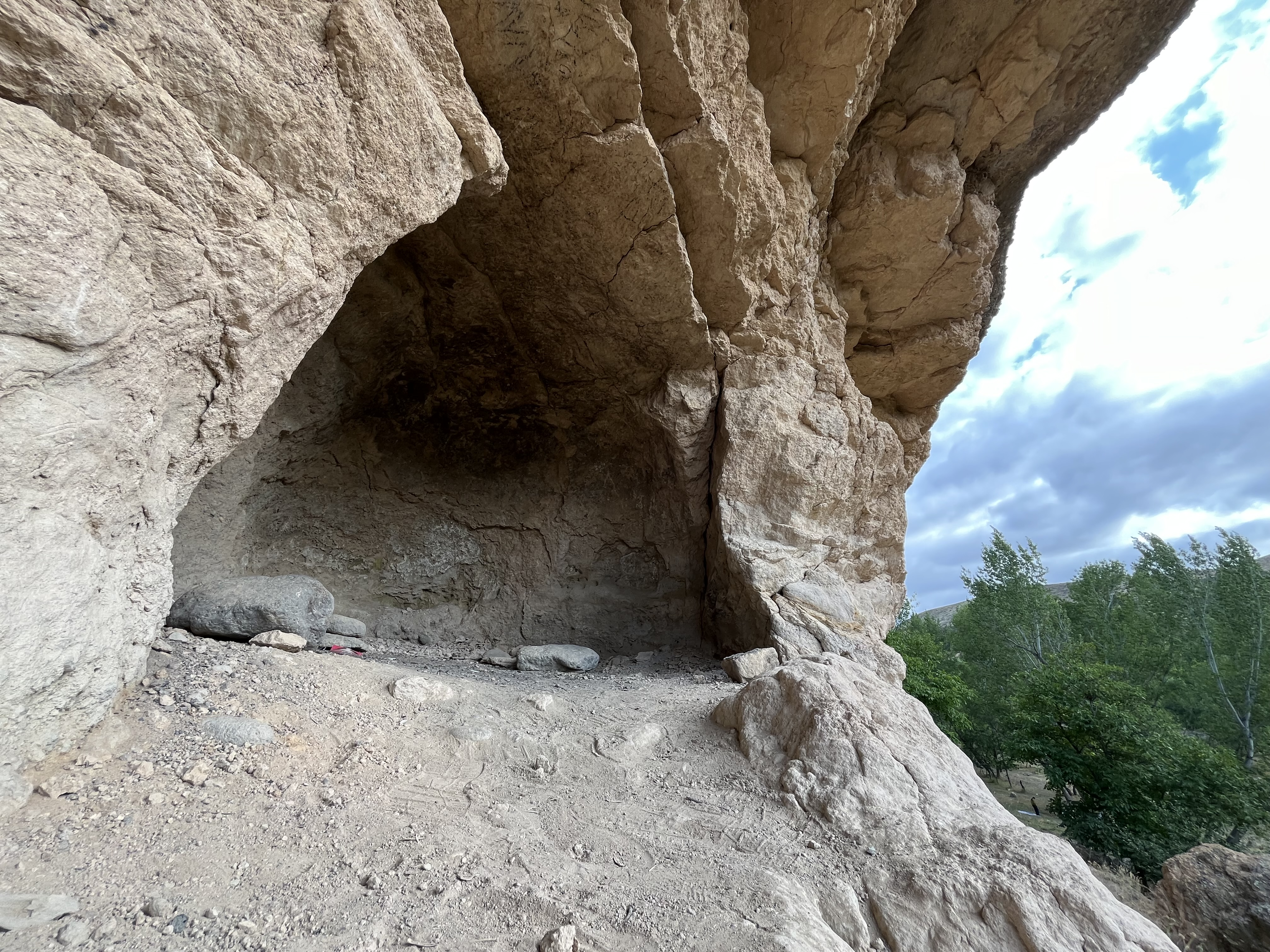

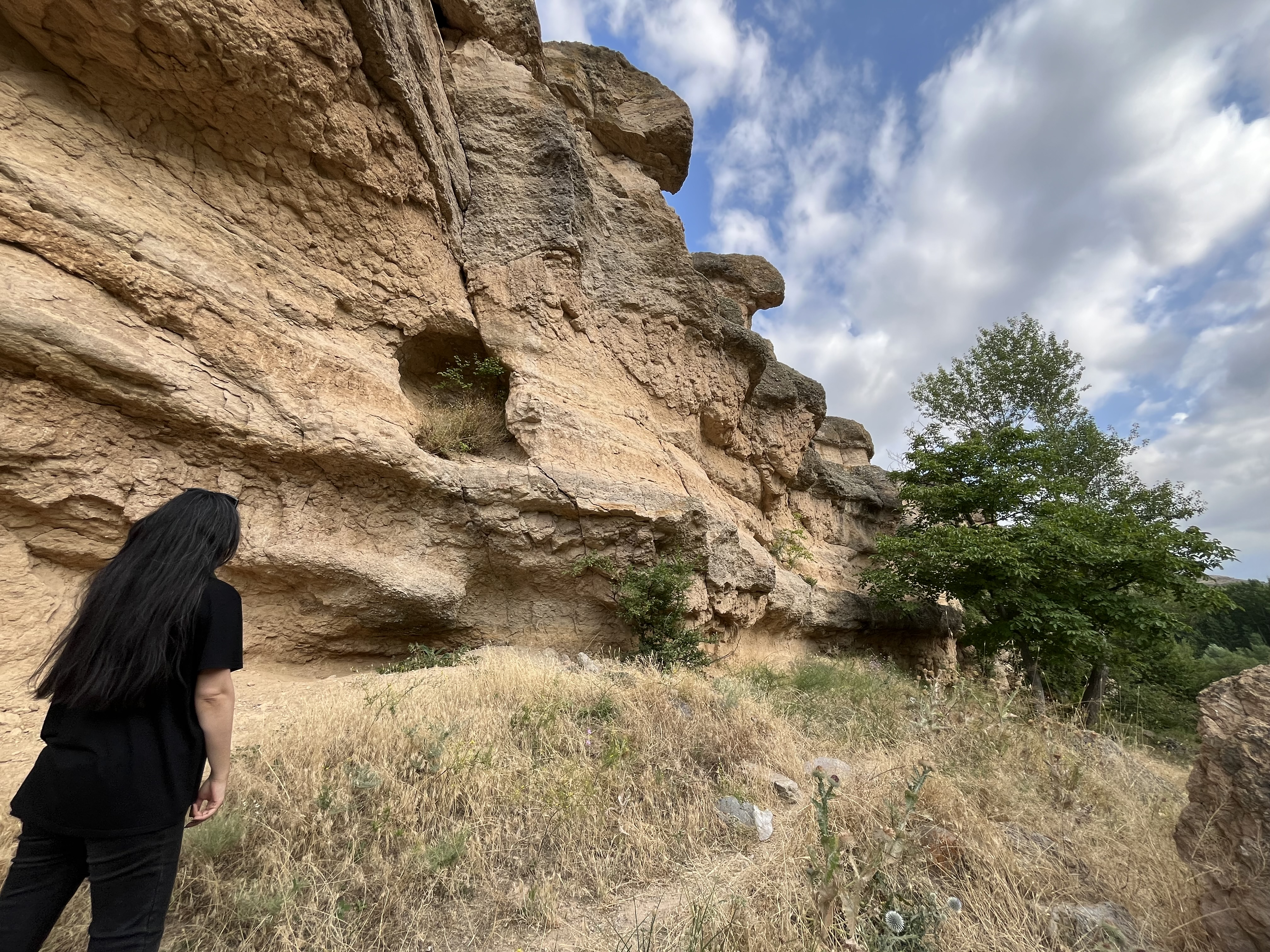

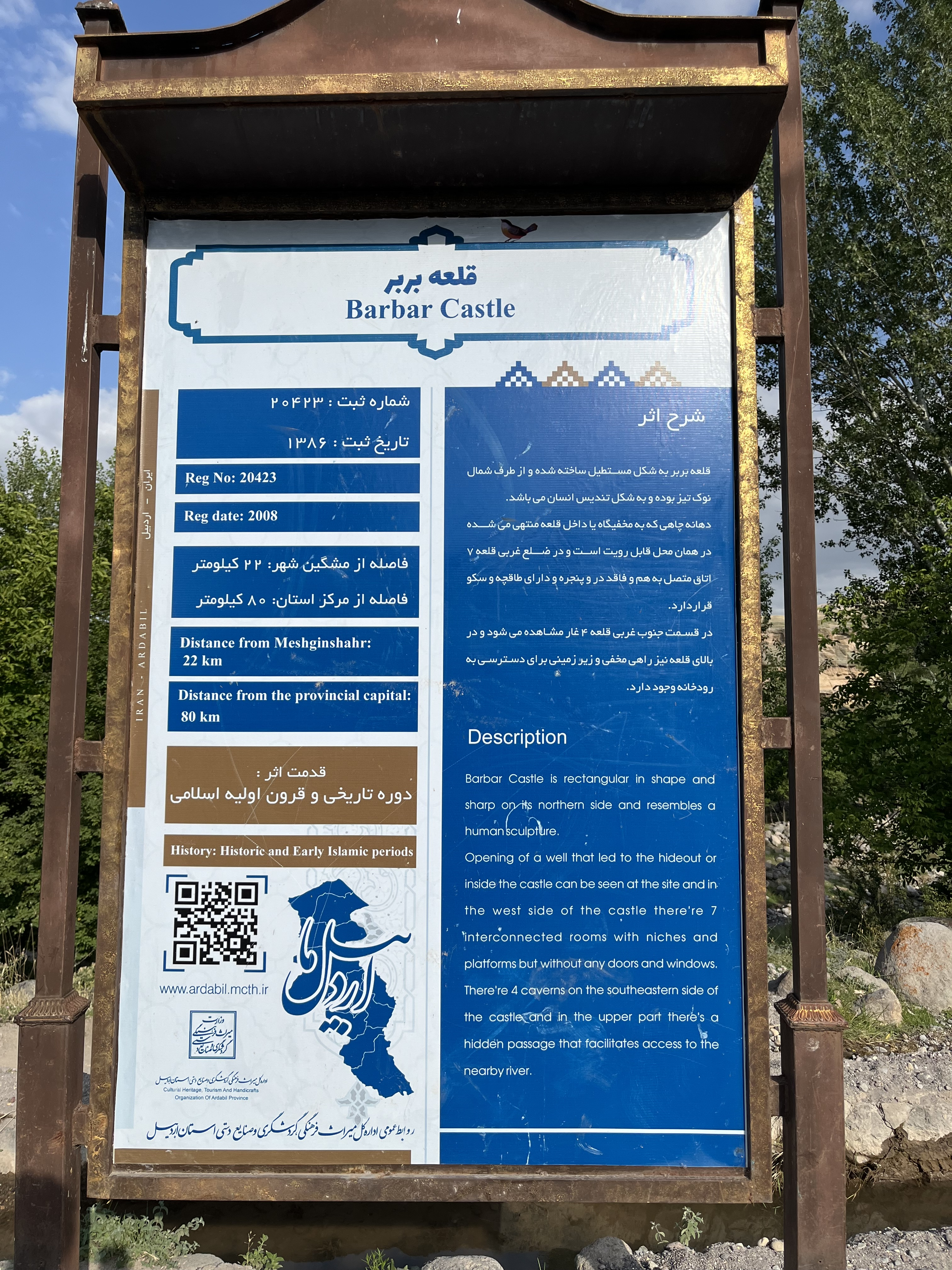
