= Tak Aghaj Castle =

Castle in Gilan Province, Iran

Tak Aghaj castle
- قلعه تک آغاج

General information
- Type: Castle
- Location: Astara County, Iran

Tak Aghaj castle (Persian: قلعه تک آغاج) is a historical castle located in Astara County in Gilan Province, The longevity of this fortress dates back to the Seljuk Empire.
