= Biuk Khan Castle =

Castle in Zanjan Province, Iran

Biuk Khan castle
- قلعه بیوک خان

General information
- Type: Castle
- Location: Abhar County, Iran

Biuk Khan castle (Persian: قلعه بیوک خان) is a historical castle located in Abhar County in Zanjan Province, The longevity of this fortress dates back to the Timurid Empire.
