= Dokhtaran Castle =

Castle in East Azerbaijan Province, Iran

- قلعه دختران

General information
- Type: Castle
- Location: Maragheh County, Iran

Dokhtaran Castle (Persian: قلعه دختران) is a castle in Maragheh County, East Azerbaijan Province. The fortress dates back to the Historical periods after Islam.
