= Bajul Ab Barik Castle =

Castle in Lorestan Province, Iran

Bajul Ab Barik castle
- قلعه باجول آب باریک

General information
- Type: Castle
- Location: Aligudarz County, Iran

Bajul Ab Barik castle (Persian: قلعه باجول آب باریک) is a historical castle located in Aligudarz County in Lorestan Province, The longevity of this fortress dates back to the Qajar dynasty.
