= Sarv-e Jahan Castle =

Castle in Zanjan Province, Iran

Sarv-e Jahan castle
- قلعه سروجهان

General information
- Type: Castle
- Location: Abhar County, Iran

Sarv-e Jahan castle (Persian: قلعه سروجهان) is a historical castle located in Abhar County in Zanjan Province, The longevity of this fortress dates back to the Ilkhanate and Seljuk Empire.
