= Bidesgan Castle =

Castle in South Khorasan Province, Iran

Bidesgan castle
- قلعه بیدسکان
- Interactive map of the Bidesgan castle area

General information
- Type: Castle
- Location: Ferdows County, Iran
- Coordinates: 34.0565°N 58.42875°E

Bidesgan castle (Persian: قلعه بیدسکان) is a historical castle located in Ferdows County in South Khorasan Province, The longevity of this fortress dates back to the Qajar dynasty.
