= Tizak Castle =

Castle in Yazd Province, Iran

Tizak castle
- قلعه تیزک
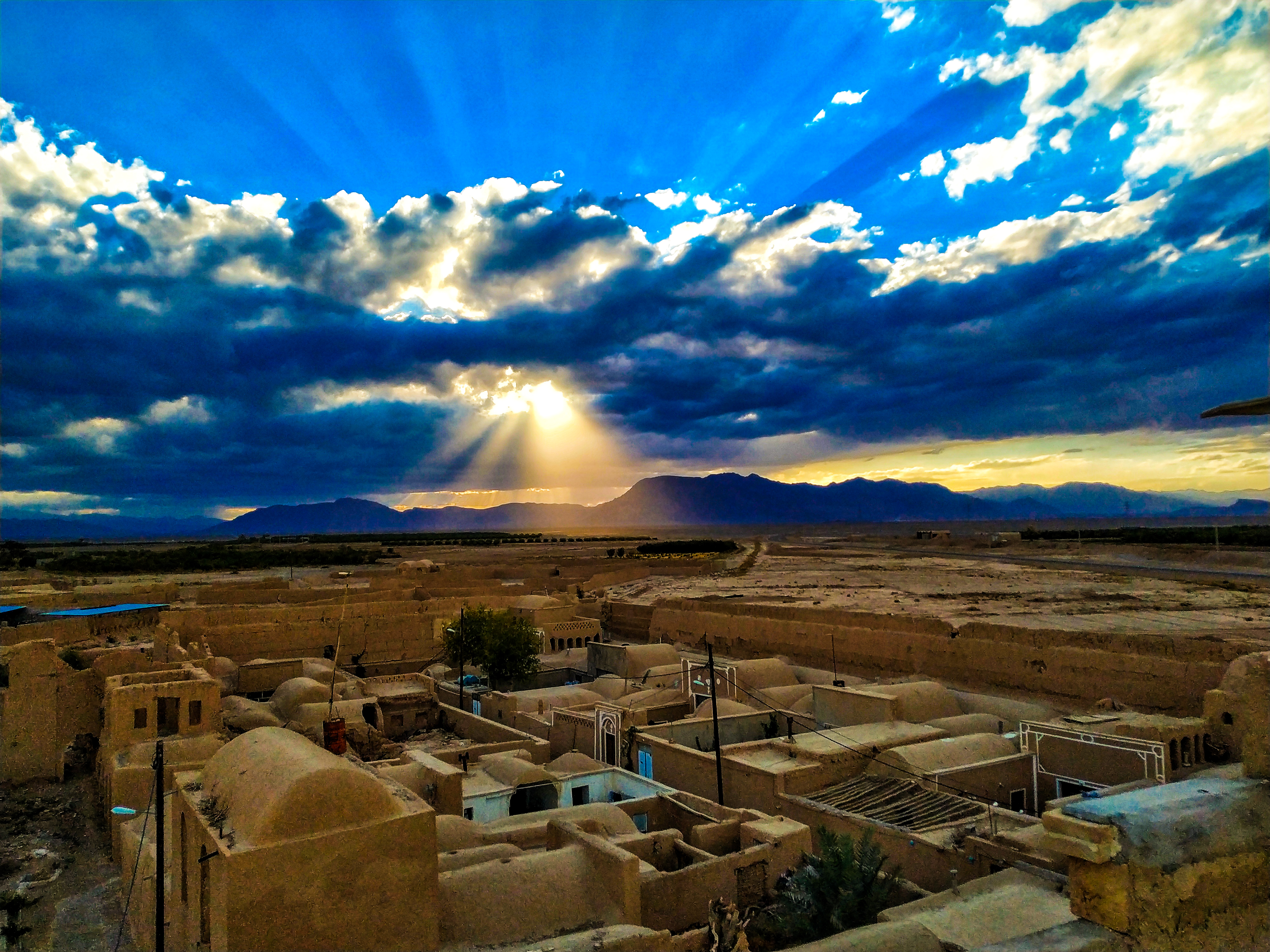
- Aerial view of the Tizak castle
- Interactive map of the Tizak castle area

General information
- Type: Castle
- Location: Abarkuh County, Iran
- Coordinates: 31.17228°N 53.16811°E

Tizak castle (Persian: قلعه تیزک) is a historical castle located in Abarkuh County in Yazd Province, The longevity of this fortress dates back to the Qajar dynasty.
