= Anjir Dehloran Castle =

Castle in Ilam Province, Iran

Anjir Dehloran castle
- قلعه انجیر دهلران

General information
- Type: Castle
- Location: Dehloran County, Iran

Anjir Dehloran castle (Persian: قلعه انجیر دهلران) is a historical castle located in Dehloran County in Ilam Province, The longevity of this fortress dates back to the Sasanian Empire.
