= Abhar Castle =

Castle in Zanjan Province, Iran

Abhar castle
- قلعه ابهر
- Interactive map of the Abhar castle area

General information
- Type: Castle
- Location: Abhar County, Iran
- Coordinates: 36°8′47.17″N 49°13′43.41″E

Abhar castle (Persian: قلعه ابهر) is a historical castle located in Abhar County in Zanjan Province, Iran. It was built after the Islamic conquest of Iran.
