= Buyni Yugun Castle =

Castle in Ardabil Province, Iran

Buyni Yugun castle
- قلعه بوینی یوغون
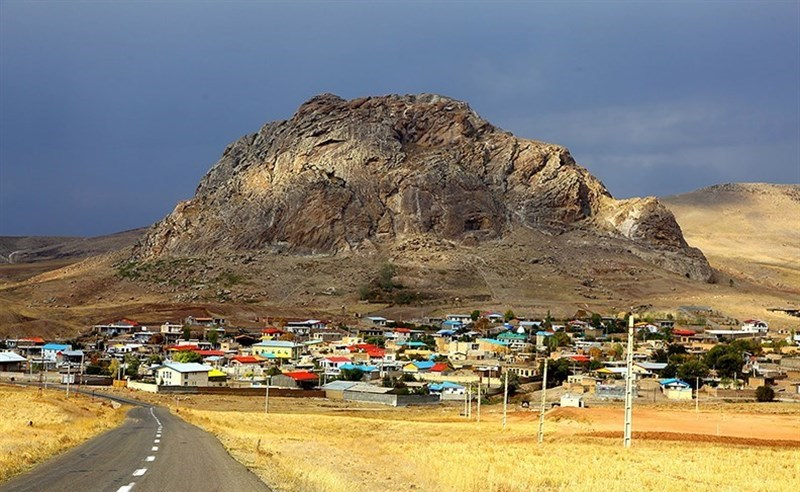
- Buyni Yugun Castle
- Interactive map of the Buyni Yugun castle area

General information
- Type: Castle
- Location: Nir County, Iran
- Coordinates: 37.96°N 48.05694°E

Buyni Yugun castle (Persian: قلعه بوینی یوغون) is a historical castle located in Nir County in Ardabil Province, The longevity of this fortress dates back to the early Achaemenid Empire.
