= Aq Qaleh Golabar Castle =

Castle in Zanjan Province, Iran

Aq Qaleh Golabar castle
- قلعه آق قلعه گلابر

General information
- Type: Castle
- Location: Ijrud County, Iran

Aq Qaleh Golabar castle (Persian: قلعه آق قلعه گلابر) is a historical castle located in Ijrud County in Zanjan Province, The longevity of this fortress dates back to the Middle Ages Historical periods after Islam.
