= Bard Zanjir Castle =

Castle in Kermanshah Province, Iran

Bard Zanjir castle
- قلعه بردزنجیر

General information
- Type: Castle
- Location: Javanrud County, Iran

Bard Zanjir castle (Persian: قلعه بردزنجیر) is a historical castle located in Javanrud County in Kermanshah Province, The longevity of this fortress dates back to the Parthian Empire.
