= Khanabad Castle =

Castle in Isfahan Province, Iran

- قلعه خان‌آباد
- Interactive map of the Khanabad Castle area

General information
- Type: Castle
- Location: Qehi, Iran
- Coordinates: 32.5764°N 52.3361°E

Khanabad Castle (Persian: قلعه خان‌آباد) is a historical castle located in Qehi in Isfahan Province, The longevity of this fortress dates back to the Qajar dynasty.
