= Ahmadabad Castle =

Castle in Yazd Province, Iran

Ahmadabad castle
- قلعه احمدآباد

General information
- Type: Castle
- Location: Abarkuh County, Iran

Ahmadabad castle (Persian: قلعه احمدآباد) is a historical castle located in Abarkuh County in Yazd Province, The longevity of this fortress dates back to the Qajar dynasty.
