= Bagh Tirjerd Castle =

Castle in Yazd Province, Iran

Bagh Tirjerd castle
- قلعه باغ تیرجرد

General information
- Type: Castle
- Location: Abarkuh County, Iran

Bagh Tirjerd castle (Persian: قلعه باغ تیرجرد) is a historical castle located in Abarkuh County in Yazd Province, The longevity of this fortress dates back to the Qajar dynasty.
