= Arbabi Castle =

Castle in Lorestan Province, Iran

Arbabi castle
- قلعه اربابی

General information
- Type: Castle
- Location: Azna County, Iran

Arbabi castle (Persian: قلعه اربابی) is a historical castle located in Azna County in Lorestan Province, The longevity of this fortress dates back to the Qajar dynasty.
