= Ardi Castle =

Castle in Yazd Province, Iran

Ardi castle
- قلعه اردی

General information
- Type: Castle
- Location: Abarkuh County, Iran

Ardi castle (Persian: قلعه اردی) is a historical castle located in Abarkuh County in Yazd Province, The longevity of this fortress dates back to the Qajar dynasty.
