= Jiq Qareh Tapeh Daz Castle =

Castle in Golestan Province, Iran

Jiq Qareh Tapeh Daz castle
- قلعه جیق قره تپه داز

General information
- Type: Castle
- Location: Aqqala County, Iran

Jiq Qareh Tapeh Daz castle (Persian: قلعه جیق قره تپه داز) is a historical castle located in Aqqala County in Golestan Province, The longevity of this fortress dates back to the Historical periods after Islam.
