= Dezak Castle =

Castle in Chaharmahal and Bakhtiari Province, Iran

Dezak castle
- قلعه دزک
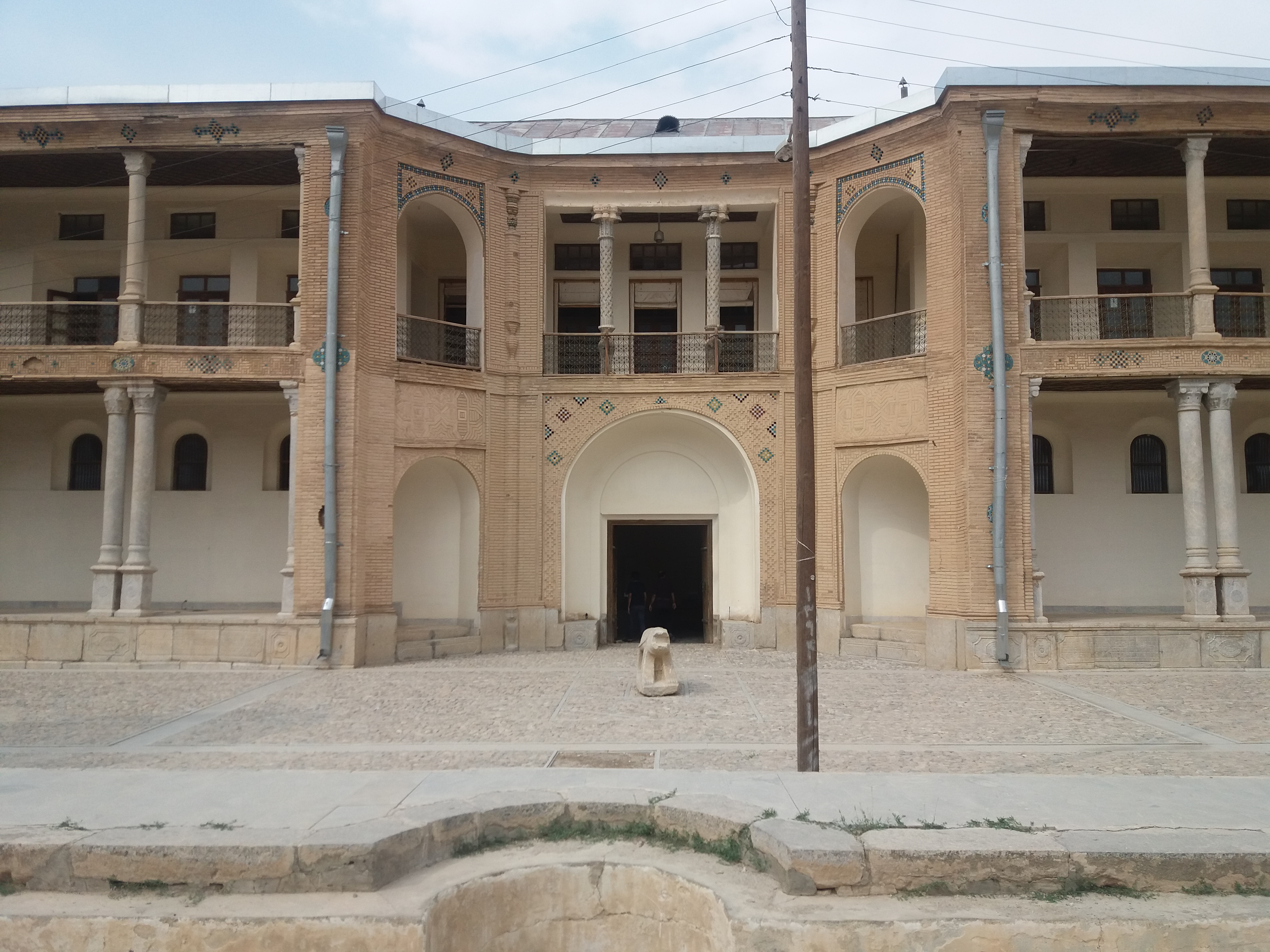
- Interactive map of the Dezak castle area

General information
- Type: Castle
- Location: Kiar County, Iran
- Coordinates: 32.0808°N 50.9660°E

Dezak castle (Persian: قلعه دزک) is a historic castle located in Kiar County in Chaharmahal and Bakhtiari province. The castle was built in the Qajar era.
