= Bedaf Castle =

Castle in Yazd Province, Iran

- قلعه بدافت

General information
- Type: Castle
- Location: Abarkuh County, Iran

Bedaf Castle (Persian: قلعه بدافت) is a historical castle located in Abarkuh County in Yazd Province, The longevity of this fortress dates back to the Sasanian Empire.
