= Tang Lorun Castle =

Castle in Fars province, Iran

Tang Lorun castle
- قلعه تنگ لرون

General information
- Type: Castle
- Location: Bavanat County, Iran

Tang Lorun Castle (Persian: قلعه تنگ لرون) is a historical castle located in Bavanat County in Fars province, The longevity of this fortress dates back to the Sasanian Empire.
