= Deh Shad Castle =

Castle in Tehran Province, Iran

Deh Shad castle
- قلعه دهشاد
- Interactive map of the Deh Shad castle area

General information
- Type: Castle
- Location: Shahriar County, Iran
- Coordinates: 35.5931°N 51.1572°E

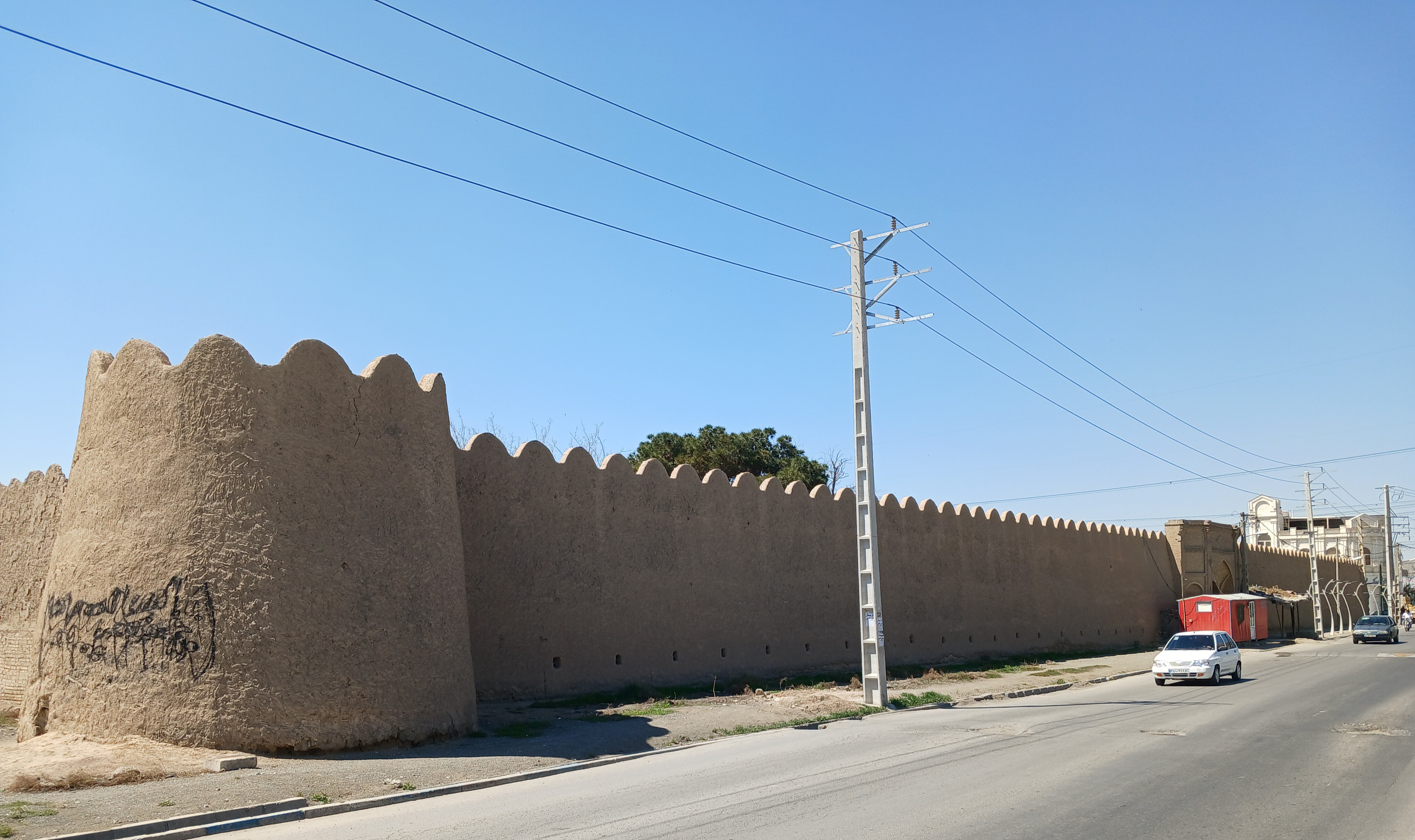

Deh Shad castle (Persian: قلعه دهشاد) is a historical castle located in Shahriar County in Tehran Province, The longevity of this fortress dates back to the Qajar dynasty.
