= Aghur Castle =

Castle in Zanjan Province, Iran

Aghur castle
- قلعه آغور

General information
- Type: Castle
- Location: Abhar County, Iran

Aghur castle (Persian: قلعه آغور) is a historical castle located in Abhar County in Zanjan Province, The longevity of this fortress dates back to the Timurid Empire.
