= Akbar Khan Castle =

Castle in Kermanshah Province, Iran

Akbar Khan castle
- قلعه اکبرخان

General information
- Type: Castle
- Location: Eslamabad-e Gharb County, Iran

Akbar Khan castle (Persian: قلعه اکبرخان) is a historical castle located in Eslamabad-e Gharb County in Kermanshah Province, Iran. The longevity of this fortress dates back to the Chalcolithic.
