= Didehban Castle =

Castle in Hormozgan Province, Iran

Didehban castle
- قلعه دیده‌بان

General information
- Type: Castle
- Location: Bastak County, Iran

Didehban castle (Persian: قلعه دیده‌بان) is a historical castle located in Bastak County in Hormozgan Province.
