= Jalal al-Din Castle =

Iranian national heritage site

Jalal al-Din castle
- قلعه جلال‌الدین
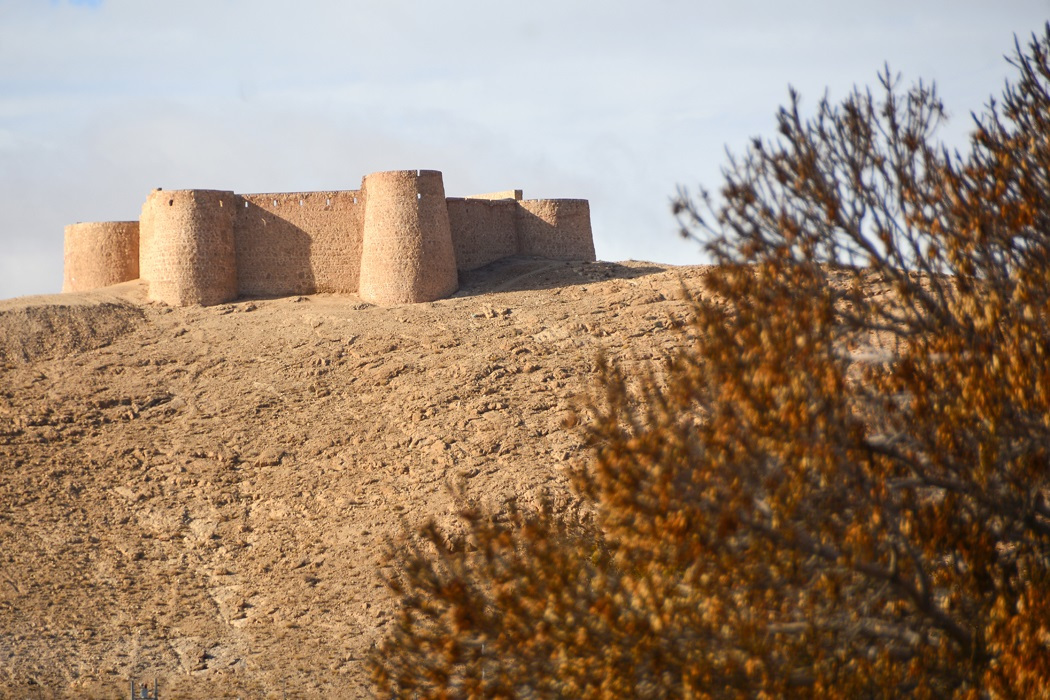

- Location within Iran
- Interactive map of the Jalal al-Din castle area

General information
- Type: Castle
- Location: Jajarm County, Iran
- Coordinates: 36°58′23″N 56°19′07″E

Jalal al-Din castle (Persian: قلعه جلال‌الدین) is a historical castle located in Jajarm County in North Khorasan Province, The longevity of this fortress dates back to the Historical periods after Islam.
