= Do Qolleh Castle =

Castle in Fars province, Iran

- قلعه دوقله

General information
- Type: Castle
- Location: Abadeh County, Iran

Do Qolleh Castle (Persian: قلعه دوقله) is a historical castle located in Abadeh County in Fars province, The longevity of this fortress dates back to the Historical periods after Islam.
