= Deh-e Khvajeh Castle =

Castle in Kerman Province, Iran

Deh-e Khvajeh castle
- قلعه ده خواجه
- Interactive map of the Deh-e Khvajeh castle area

General information
- Type: Castle
- Location: Rafsanjan County, Iran
- Coordinates: 30.3546°N 56.0026°E

Deh-e Khvajeh castle (Persian: قلعه ده خواجه) is a historical castle located in Rafsanjan County in Kerman Province. The longevity of this fortress dates back to the Late Centuries Historical Periods of Islam.
