= Eshkanan Castle =

Castle in Fars province, Iran

Eshkanan castle
- قلعه اشکنان

General information
- Type: Castle
- Location: Lamerd County, Iran

Eshkanan castle (Persian: قلعه اشکنان) is a historical castle located in Lamerd County in Fars province, The longevity of this fortress dates back to the Qajar dynasty.
