= Deh Kord Castle =

Castle in Lorestan Province, Iran

Deh Kord castle (Persian: قلعه دهکرد) is a castle in Borujerd County, Lorestan Province, Iran. The fortress dates back to the Qajar dynasty.
