= Bahaabad Castle =

Castle in Kerman Province, Iran

Bahaabad castle
- قلعه بهاءآباد

General information
- Type: Castle
- Location: Zarand County, Iran

Bahaabad castle (Persian: قلعه بهاءآباد) is a historical castle located in Zarand County in Kerman Province, The longevity of this fortress dates back to the Safavid dynasty.
