= Asu Castle =

Castle in South Khorasan Province, Iran

Asu castle
- قلعه آسو

General information
- Type: Castle
- Location: Birjand County, Iran

Asu castle (Persian: قلعه آسو) is a historical castle located in Birjand County in South Khorasan Province, The fortress dates back to the Timurid Empire.
