= Do Sineh Castle =

Castle in Kurdistan Province, Iran

Kuran castle
- قلعه دوسینه

General information
- Type: Castle
- Location: Baneh County, Iran

Kuran castle (Persian: قلعه دوسینه) is a historical castle located in Baneh County in Kurdistan Province.
