= Afrasiab Khan Castle =

Castle in Fars province, Iran

Afrasiab Khan castle
- قلعه افراسیاب خان

General information
- Type: Castle
- Location: Arsanjan County, Iran

Afrasiab Khan castle (Persian: قلعه افراسیاب خان) is a historical castle located in Arsanjan County in Fars province, The longevity of this fortress dates back to the Qajar dynasty.
