= Davudabad Castle =

Castle in Kerman Province, Iran

Davudabad castle
- قلعه داوودآباد
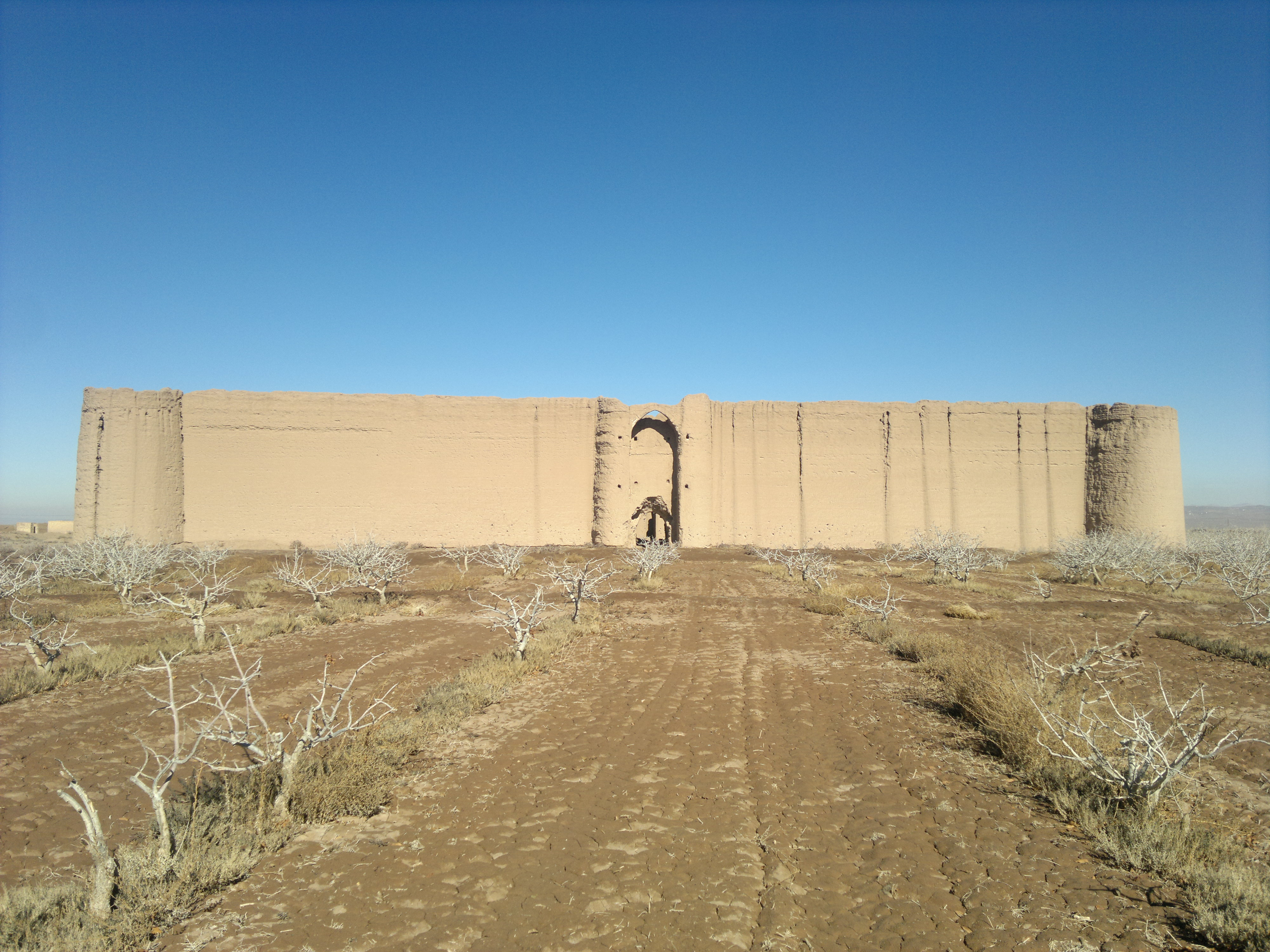
- Interactive map of the Davudabad castle area

General information
- Type: Castle
- Location: Anar County, Iran

Davudabad castle (Persian: قلعه داوودآباد) is a historical castle located in Anar County in Kerman Province, Iran. The longevity of this fortress dates back to the Safavid dynasty and Qajar dynasty.

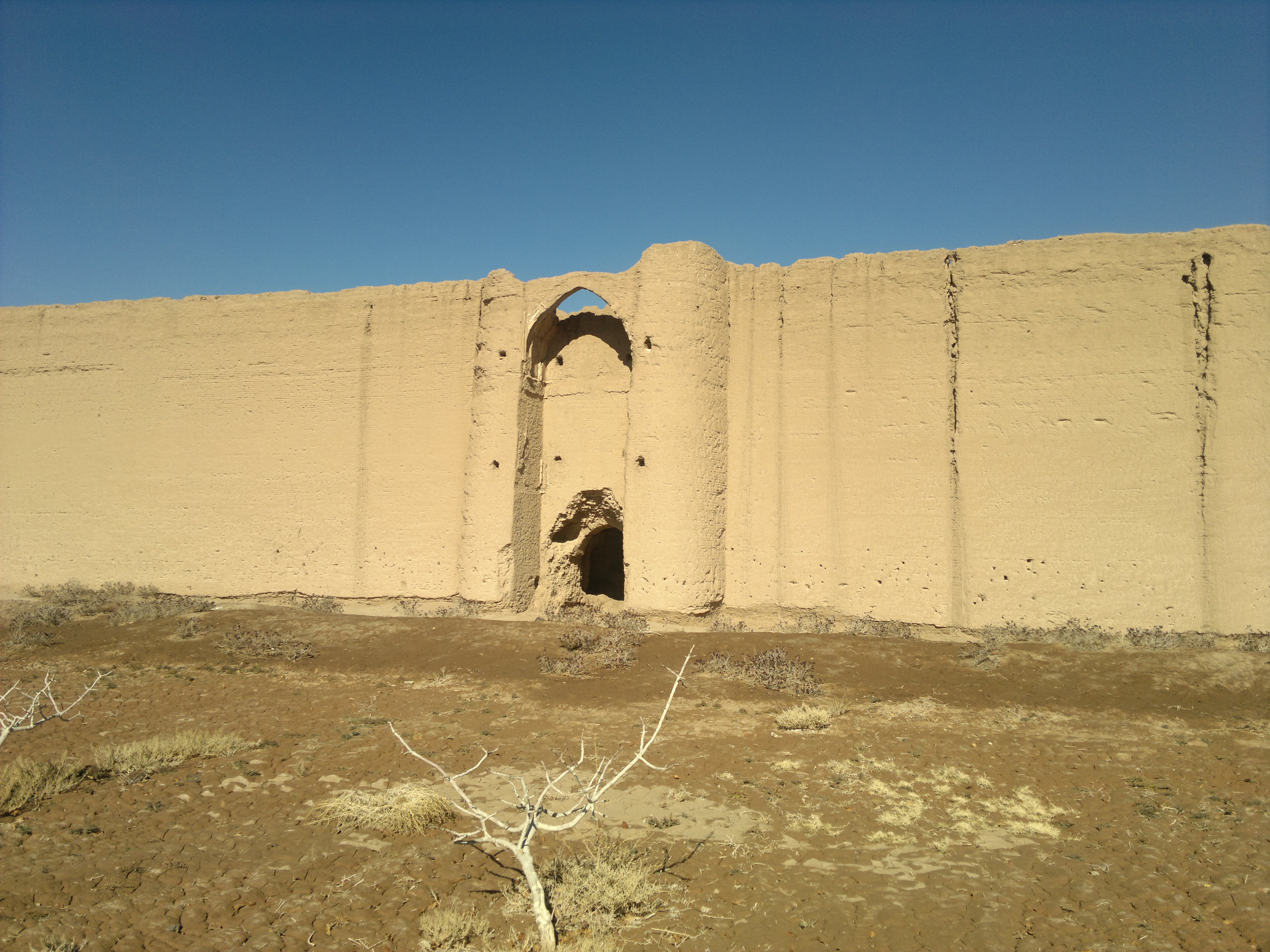

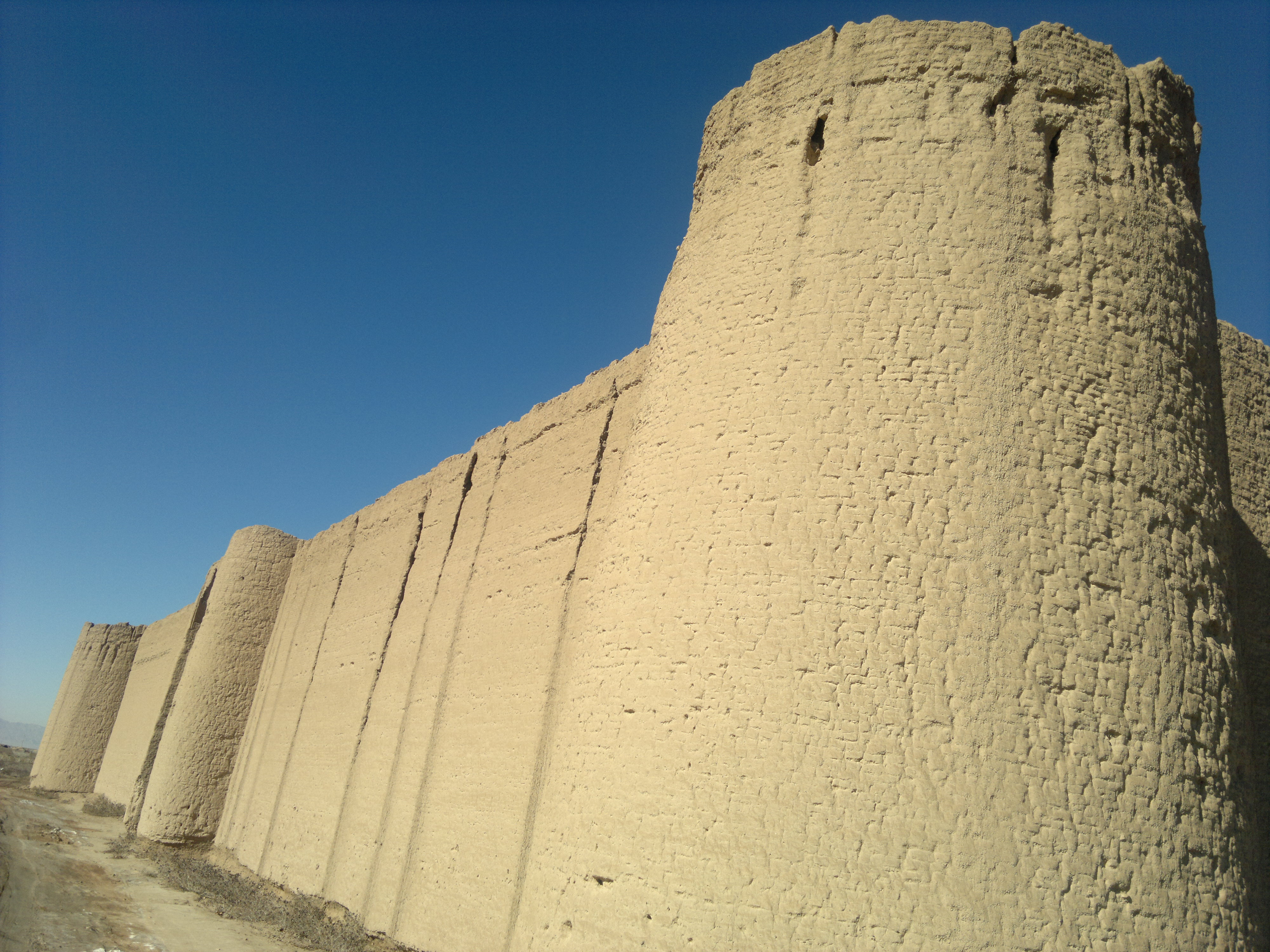
