= Bandbon Castle =

Castle in Gilan Province, Iran

Bandbon castle
- قلعه بندبن
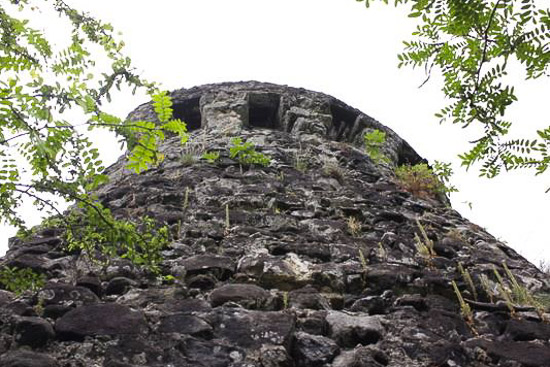

General information
- Type: Castle
- Location: Rudsar County, Gilan Province, Iran

Bandbon castle (Persian: قلعه بندبن) is a historical castle located in Rudsar County in Gilan Province, The longevity of this fortress dates back to the Hundreds of years ago.
