= Ab Sefid Ab Castle =

Castle in Isfahan province, Iran

- قلعه آب سفید آب

General information
- Type: Castle
- Location: Kashan County, Iran

Ab Sefid Ab Castle (Persian: قلعه آب سفید آب) is a historical castle located in Kashan County in Isfahan province, The longevity of this fortress dates back to the Safavid dynasty.
