= Asgarabad Castle =

Castle in West Azerbaijan Province, Iran

- قلعه عسگرآباد

General information
- Type: Castle
- Location: Urmia County, Iran

Asgarabad Castle (Persian: قلعه عسگرآباد) is a historical castle located in Urmia County in West Azerbaijan Province, The longevity of this fortress dates back to the Qajar dynasty.
