= Arudasht Lar Castle =

Castle in Mazandaran Province, Iran

Arudasht Lar castle
- قلعه آرودشت لار

General information
- Type: Castle
- Location: Amol County, Iran

Arudasht Lar castle (Persian: قلعه آرودشت لار) is a historical castle located in Amol County in Mazandaran Province, The longevity of this fortress dates back to the Historical periods after Islam.
