= Aq Bolagh Castle =

Castle in Lorestan Province, Iran

Aq Bolagh castle
- قلعه آقبلاغ

General information
- Type: Castle
- Location: Borujerd County, Iran

Aq Bolagh castle (Persian: قلعه آقبلاغ) is a castle in Borujerd County in Lorestan Province, Iran. The fortress dates back to the Qajar dynasty.
