= Zardak Castle =

Castle in Yazd Province, Iran

Zardak castle
- قلعه زردک

General information
- Type: Castle
- Location: Ardakan County, Iran

Zardak castle (Persian: قلعه زردک) is a historical castle located in Ardakan County in Yazd Province, The longevity of this fortress dates back to the Qajar dynasty.
