= Arg Bala Castle =

Castle in North Khorasan Province, Iran

Arg Bala castle
- قلعه ارگ بالا

General information
- Type: Castle
- Location: Bojnord County, Iran

Arg Bala castle (Persian: قلعه ارگ بالا) is a historical castle located in Bojnord County in North Khorasan Province, The longevity of this fortress dates back to the Parthian Empire.
