= Bayazeh Castle =

Castle in Isfahan Province, Iran

- قلعه بیاضه
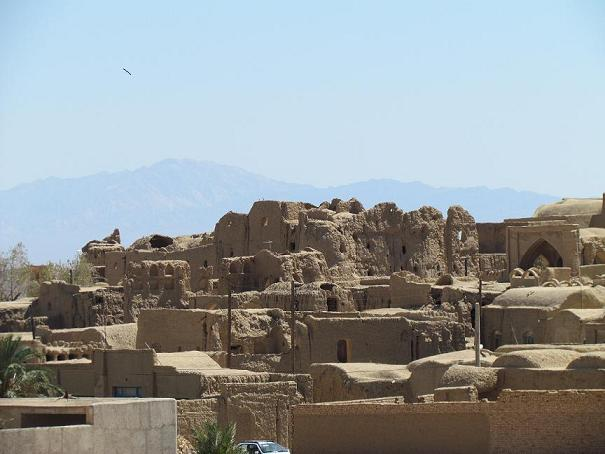
- Bayazeh Castle
- Interactive map of the Bayazeh Castle area

General information
- Type: Castle
- Location: Khur and Biabanak County, Iran
- Coordinates: 33.33375°N 55.10633°E

Bayazeh Castle (Persian: قلعه بیاضه) is a historical castle located in Khur and Biabanak County in Isfahan Province, Iran. The longevity of this fortress dates back to the Sasanian Empire.
