= Zard Castle =

Castle in Semnan Province, Iran

Zard castle
- قلعه زرد
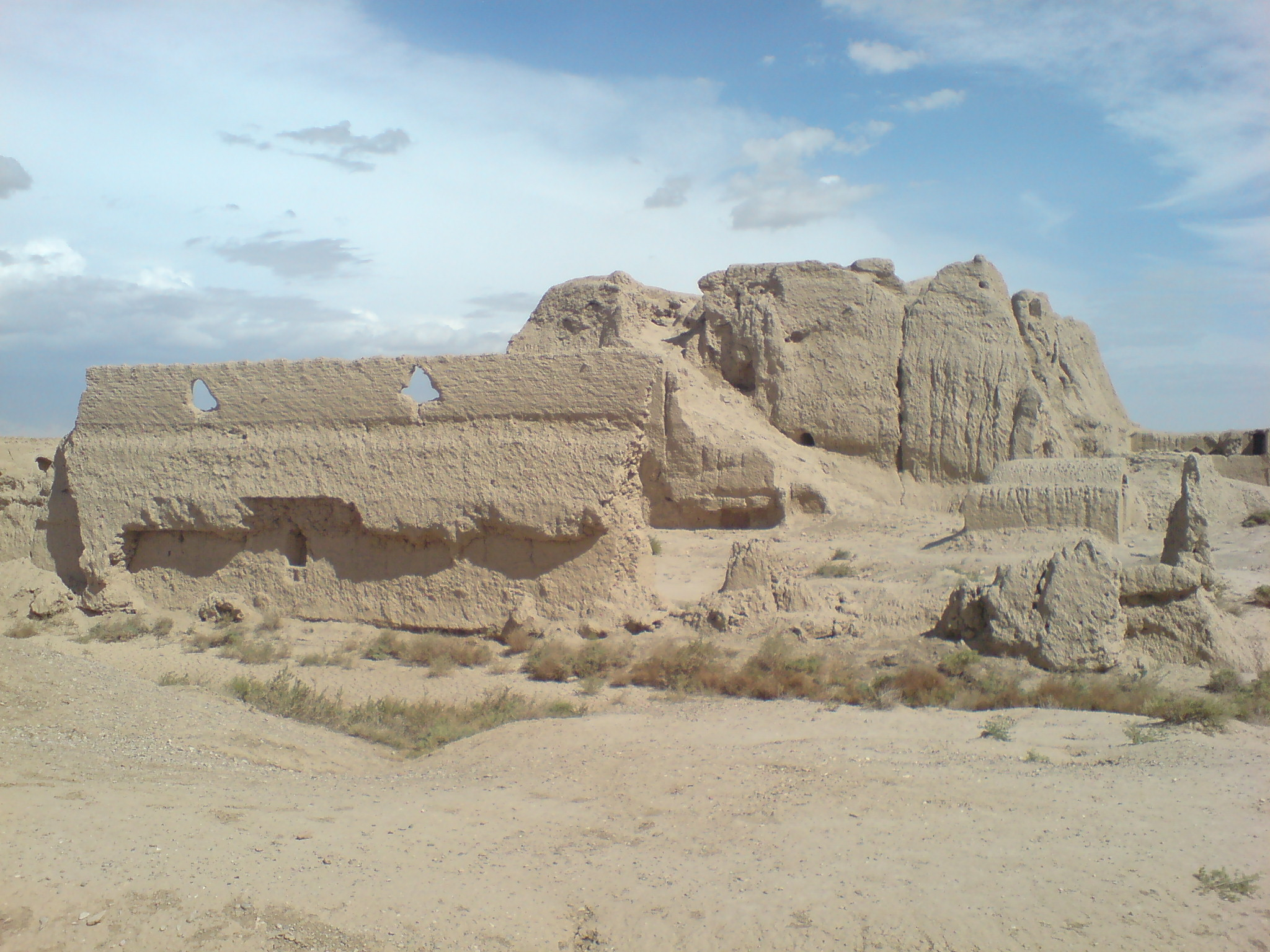

- Location within Iran

General information
- Type: Castle
- Location: Damghan County, Iran
- Coordinates: 36.12958°N 54.39425°E

Zard castle (Persian: قلعه زرد) is a historical castle located in Damghan County in Semnan Province, The longevity of this fortress dates back to the Historical periods after Islam.
