= Jonah in Islam =

Prophet of Islam

Prophet Yunus Alayhi as-Salam
- يُوْنُس; Jonah
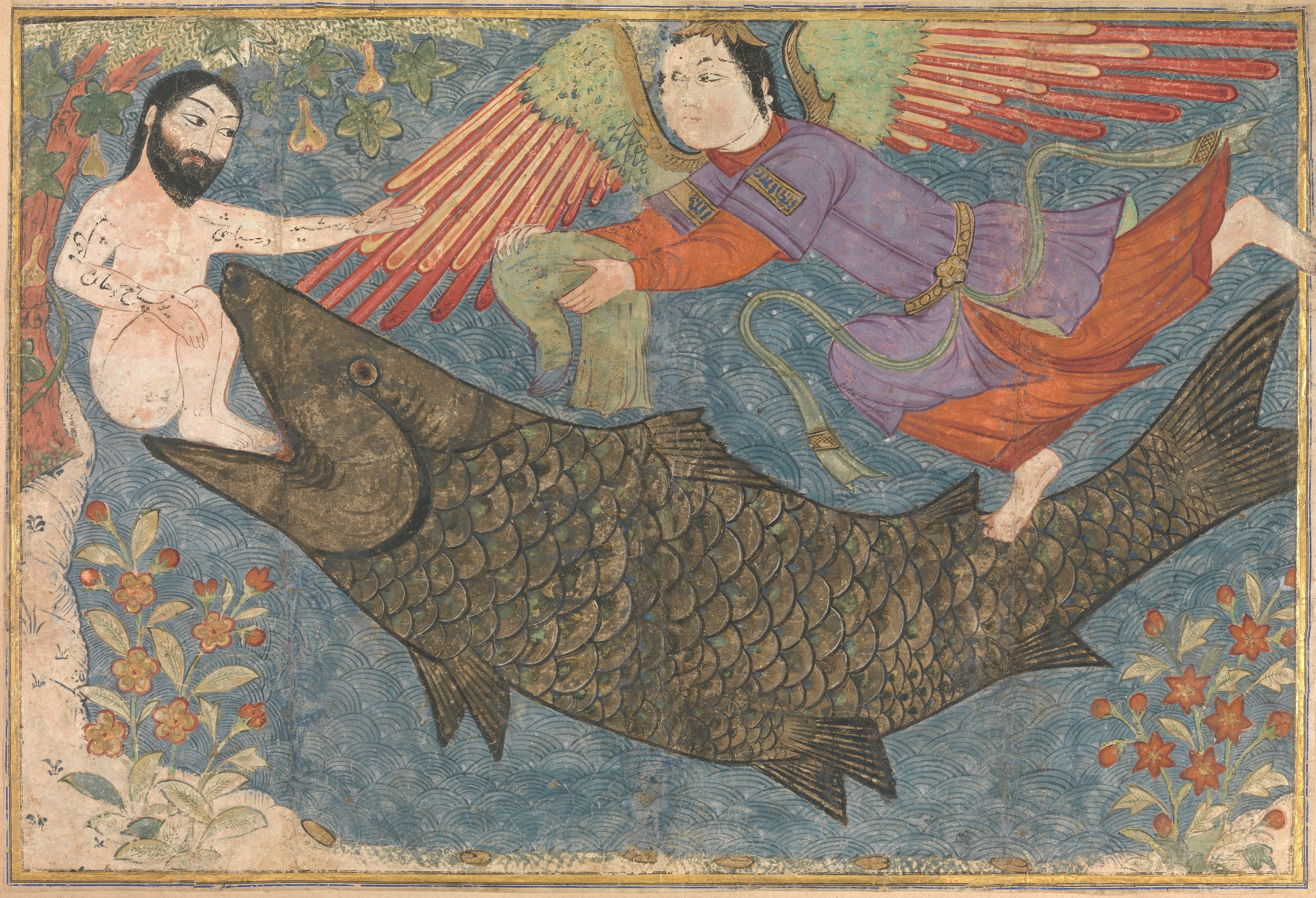
- Jonah and the giant fish in the Jami' al-tawarikh (c. 1400), Metropolitan Museum of Art

Prophet of Islam
- Preceded by: Alyasa
- Succeeded by: Irmiya/Armiya

Personal life
- Born: Yunus ibn Matta Nineveh, Mesopotamia
- Died: Nineveh, Mesopotamia
- Resting place: Al-Nabi Yunus Mosque
- Parent: Matta (father)
- Region: Mesopotamia

Religious life
- Religion: Islam

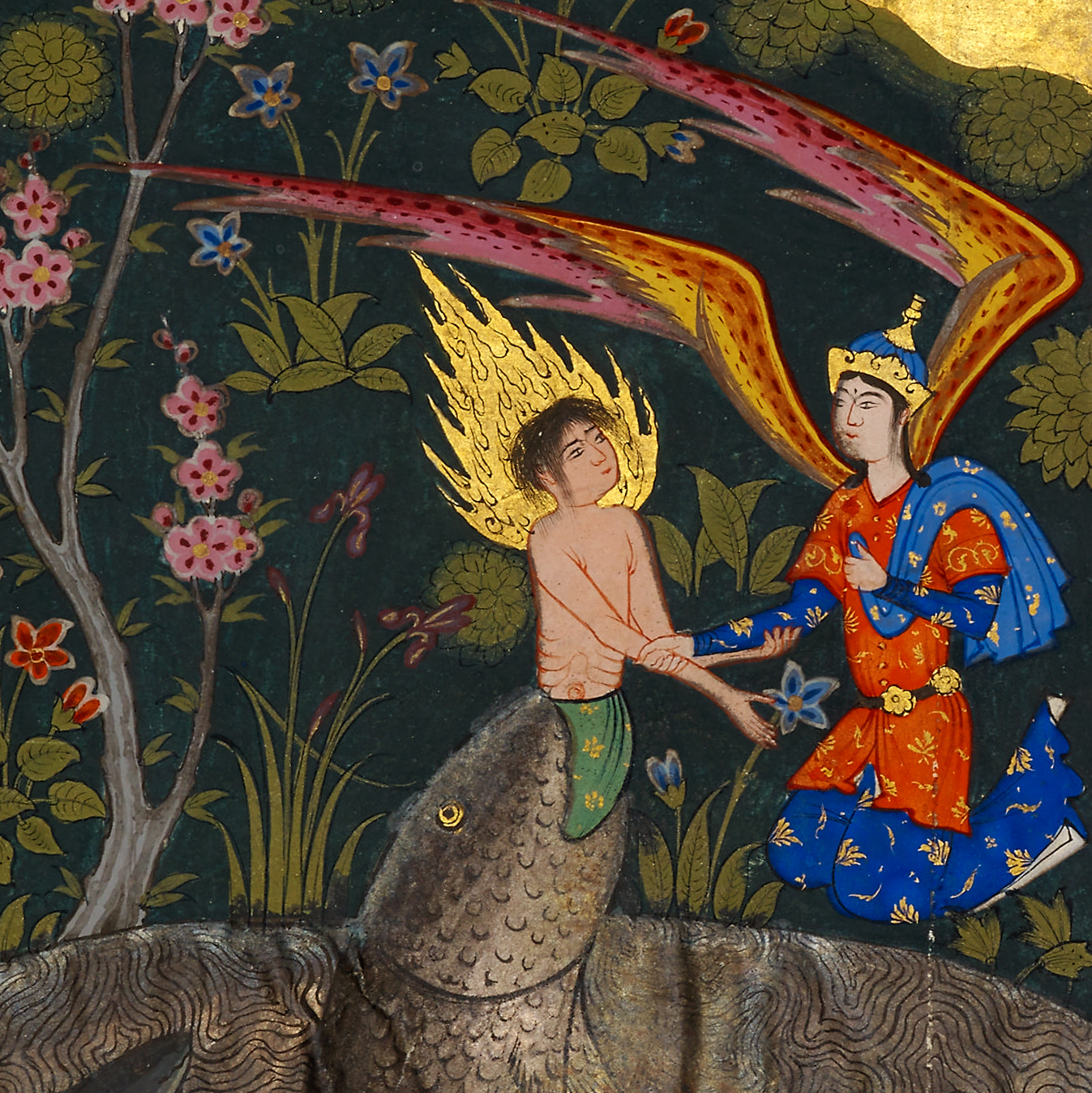
Islamic miniature of Yunus being rescued from the fish by the angel Jibril.

Yunus ibn Matta (Arabic: يُوْنُس ٱبْن مَتّىٰ, romanized: Yūnus ibn Mattā) is a prophet of God in Islam corresponding to Jonah son of Amittai in the Hebrew Bible. Jonah is the only one of the Twelve Minor Prophets in the Hebrew Bible to be named in the Quran. The tenth chapter of the Quran, Yunus, is named after him.

In the Quran, Yunus is mentioned several times by name, as an apostle of god, and as Dhu l-Nun (Arabic: ذُو ٱلنُّوْن, lit. 'The One of the Fish').

== Quranic mentions ==
In Al-Anbiya 21:87 and Al-Qalam 68:48, Yunus is called Dhul-Nūn (Arabic: ذُو ٱلنُّوْن, lit. 'The One of the Fish'). In An-Nisa 4:163 and Al-An'am 6:86, he is referred to as "an apostle of God". Surah 37:139-148 retells the full story of Yunus:

So also was Jonah among those sent (by Us).
When he ran away (like a slave from captivity) to the ship (fully) laden,
He (agreed to) cast lots, and he was condemned:
Then the whale did swallow him, and he had done acts worthy of blame.
Had it not been that he (repented and) glorified Allah,
He would certainly have remained inside the Fish till the Day of Resurrection.
But We cast him forth on the naked shore in a state of sickness,
And We caused to grow, over him, a spreading plant of the gourd kind.
And We sent him (on a mission) to a hundred thousand (men) or more.
And they believed; so We permitted them to enjoy (their life) for a while.

— Quran, chapter 37 (As-Saaffat), verses 139–148

The Quran does not mention Yunus' heritage, but Muslim tradition teaches that Yunus was from the tribe of Benjamin.

== Hadithic mentions ==
Yunus is also mentioned in a few incidents during the lifetime of Muhammad. In some instances, Yunus' name is spoken of with praise and reverence by Muhammad. According to historical narrations about Muhammad's life, after ten years of receiving revelations, Muhammad went to the city of Ta’if to see if its leaders would allow him to preach his message from there rather than Mecca, but he was cast from the city by the people. He took shelter in the garden of Utbah and Shaybah, two members of the Quraysh tribe. They sent their servant, Addas, to serve him grapes for sustenance. Muhammad asked Addas where he was from and the servant replied Nineveh. "The town of Yunus the just, son of Amittai!" Muhammad exclaimed. Addas was shocked because he knew that the pagan Arabs had no knowledge of Yunus. He then asked how Muhammad knew of this man. "We are brothers," Muhammad replied. "Yunus was a Prophet of God and I, too, am a Prophet of God." Addas immediately accepted Islam and kissed the hands and feet of Muhammad.

One of the Hadith of Muhammad, in Sahih al-Bukhari, says that Muhammad said "One should not say that I am better than Yunus". Ibn Abi al-Salt, an older contemporary of Muhammad, taught that, had Yunus not prayed to Allah, he would have remained trapped inside the fish until Day of Resurrection but, because of his prayer, Yunus "stayed only a few days within the belly of the fish".

The ninth-century Persian historian Al-Tabari records that, while Jonah was inside the fish, "none of his bones or members were injured". Al-Tabari also writes that Allah made the body of the fish transparent, allowing Yunus to see the "wonders of the deep" and that Yunus heard all the fish singing praises to Allah. Kisai Marvazi, a tenth-century poet, records that Yunus' father was seventy years old when Yunus was born and that he died soon afterwards, leaving Yunus' mother with nothing but a wooden spoon, which turned out to be a cornucopia.

== Tombs ==
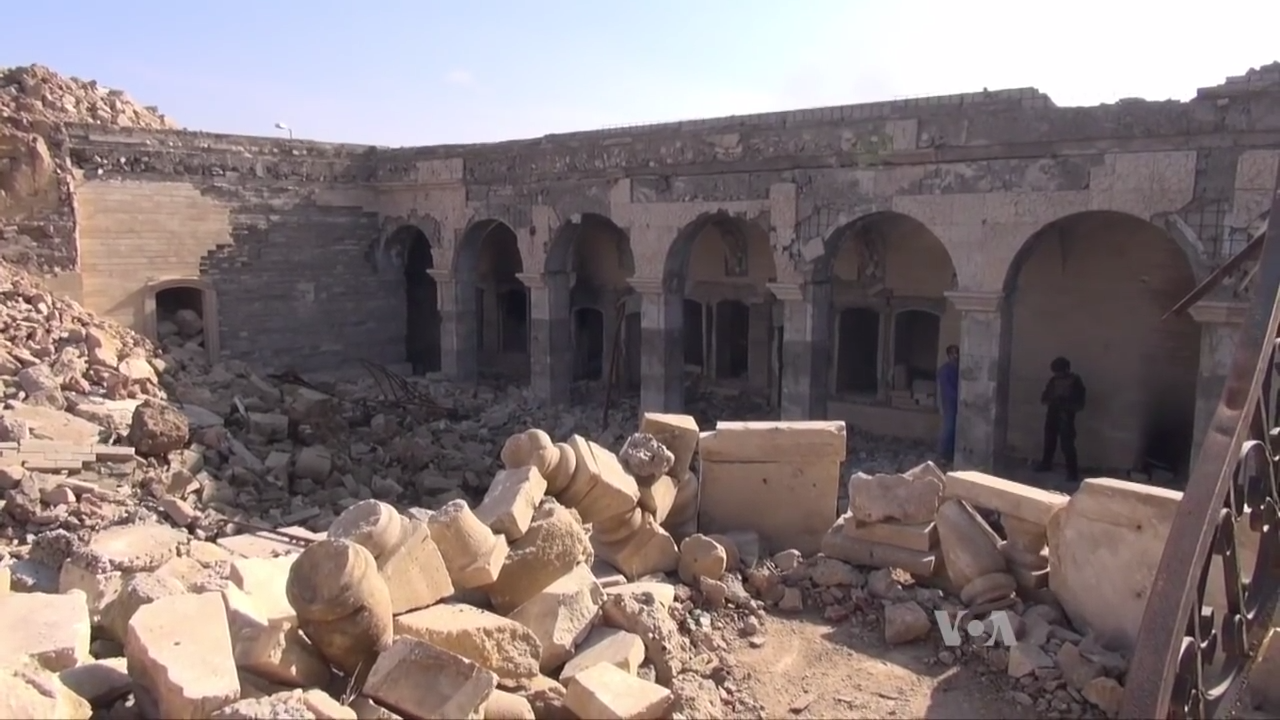
Photograph of the ruins of the mosque of Yunus, following its destruction by ISIL

Nineveh's current location is marked by excavations of five gates, parts of walls on four sides, and two large mounds: the hill of Kuyunjik and hill of Nabi Yunus. A mosque atop Nabi Yunus was dedicated to Jonah and contained a shrine, which was revered by both Muslims and Christians as the site of Jonah's tomb. The tomb was a popular pilgrimage site and a symbol of unity for Jews, Christians, and Muslims across the Middle East. On July 24, 2014, the Islamic State destroyed the mosque containing the tomb as part of a campaign to destroy religious sanctuaries it deemed to be idolatrous.

After Mosul was taken back from the Islamic State in January 2017, an Assyrian palace built by Esarhaddon dating to around the first half of the 7th century BCE was discovered beneath the ruined mosque. ISIL had plundered the palace of items to sell on the black market, but some of the artifacts that were more difficult to transport remained in place.

=== Other Muslim tombs ===
Other reputed locations of Jonah's tomb include the Israeli Arab village of Mashhad, located on the ancient site of Gath-hepher in Israel; the Palestinian West Bank town of Halhul, 5 km (3.1 mi) north of Hebron; and a sanctuary near the city of Sarepta in Lebanon. Another tradition places the tomb at a hill now called Giv'at Yonah, "Jonah's Hill", at the northern edge of the Israeli town of Ashdod, at a site covered by a modern lighthouse.

A tomb of Jonah can be found in Diyarbakır, Turkey, located behind the mihrab at Fatih Pasha Mosque. Evliya Çelebi states in his Seyahatnâme that he visited the tombs of Jonah.
