= Jonah =

Biblical and Quranic prophet

Jonah יוֹנָה
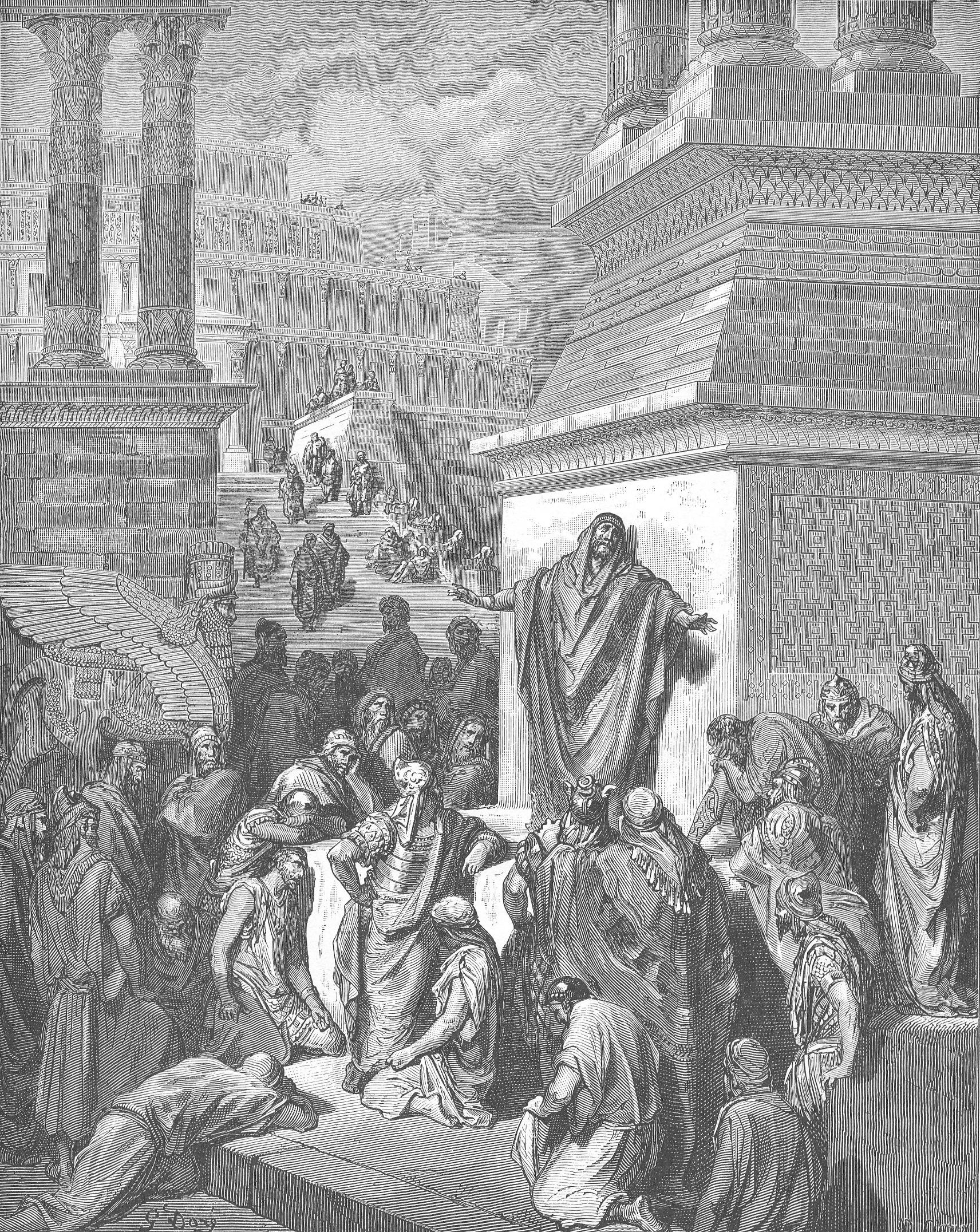
- Jonah Preaching to the Ninevites (1866) by Gustave Doré, in La Grande Bible de Tours

Prophet
- Born: 9th century BCE; Gath-hepher, Kingdom of Israel
- Died: 8th century BCE
- Venerated in: Judaism; Christianity; Islam; Baháʼí Faith; Rastafari
- Major shrine: Tomb of Jonah (destroyed), Mosul, Iraq
- Father: Amittai
- Feast: 21 September (Catholicism)

Jonah or Jonas (Hebrew: יוֹנָה Yōnā, lit. 'dove') (Note: Ancient Greek: Ἰωνᾶς Iōnâs; Arabic: يونس Yūnus, Yūnis or يونان Yūnān; Latin: Ionas) was a Jewish prophet from Gath-hepher in the Northern Kingdom of Israel around the 8th century BCE according to the Hebrew Bible. He is the central figure of the Book of Jonah, one of the minor prophets, which details his reluctance in delivering the judgment of God to the city of Nineveh (near present-day Mosul) in the Neo-Assyrian Empire. After he is swallowed by a large sea creature (Hebrew: דג גדול, romanized: dāḡ gāḏol, lit. 'large fish') and then released, he returns to the divine mission.

In Judaism, the story of Jonah represents the teaching of repentance in Judaism, the ability to repent to God for forgiveness. In the New Testament of Christianity, Jesus calls himself "greater than Jonah" and promises the Pharisees "the sign of Jonah" when referring to his resurrection. Early Christian interpreters viewed Jonah as a type of Jesus. Jonah in Islam is regarded as a prophet and the narrative of Jonah appears in a surah of the Quran named after him, Yūnus.

Many modern Bible scholars suggest the Book of Jonah is fictional, and at least partially satirical. Most scholars consider the Book of Jonah to have been composed long after the events it describes due to its use of words and motifs exclusive to postexilic Aramaic sources. The character of Jonah, son of Amittai, may have been based on the historical prophet of the same name who prophesied during the reign of King Amaziah of Judah, as mentioned in 2 Kings.

Although the creature that swallowed Jonah is often depicted in art and culture as a whale, the Hebrew text uses the phrase "large fish". In the 17th century and early 18th century, the species of the fish that swallowed Jonah was the subject of speculation by naturalists, who interpreted the story as an account of a historical incident. Some modern scholars of folklore, on the other hand, note similarities between Jonah and other legendary religious figures, like the Indian yogi Matsyendranatha "Lord of the Fishes", the Sumerian king Gilgamesh, and the Greek hero Jason.

== Book of Jonah ==
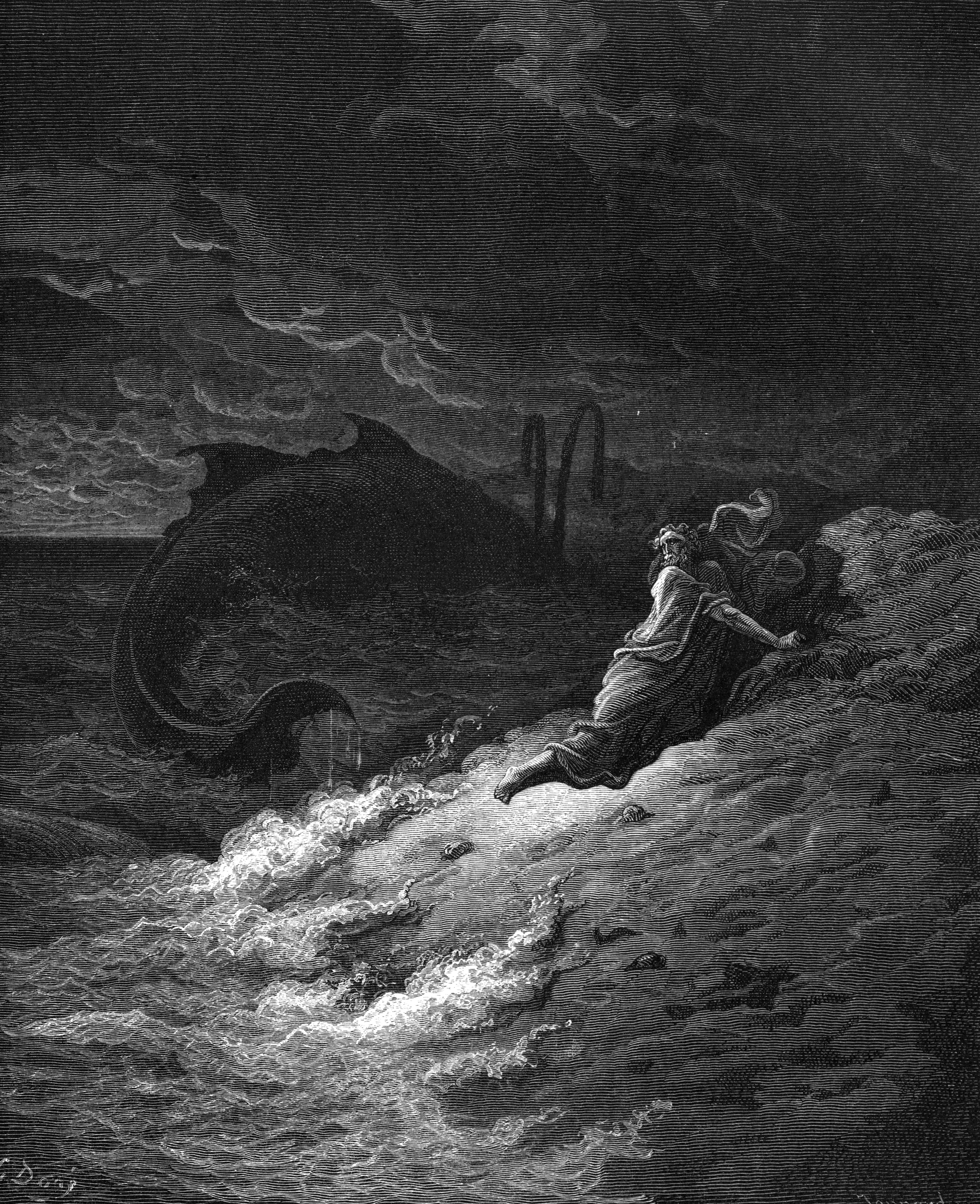
Jonah Cast Forth by the Whale (1874) by Gustave Doré

Jonah is the central character in the Book of Jonah, in which God commands him to go to the city of Nineveh to prophesy against it "for their great wickedness is come up before me", but Jonah instead attempts to flee from "the presence of the Lord" by going to Jaffa (sometimes transliterated as Joppa or Joppe). He sets sail for Tarshish. A huge storm arises and the sailors, realizing that it is no ordinary storm, cast lots and discover that Jonah is to blame. Jonah admits this and says that if he is thrown overboard, the storm will cease. The sailors refuse to do this and continue rowing, but all their efforts fail, and they eventually throw Jonah overboard. As a result, the storm calms and the sailors offer sacrifices to God.

After being cast from the ship, Jonah is swallowed by a large fish, within the belly of which he remains for three days and three nights. While in the great fish, Jonah prays to God in his affliction and commits to giving thanks and to paying what he has vowed. God commands the fish to vomit Jonah out.

God again commands Jonah to travel to Nineveh and prophesy to its inhabitants. This time he travels there and enters the city, crying, "In forty days Nineveh shall be overthrown." After Jonah has walked across Nineveh, the people begin to believe his word and proclaim a fast. The king of Nineveh puts on sackcloth and sits in ashes, making a proclamation which decrees fasting, the wearing of sackcloth, prayer and repentance. God sees their repentant hearts and spares the city at that time. The entire city is humbled and broken, with the people (and even the livestock) wearing sackcloth and ashes.

Displeased by this, Jonah refers to his earlier flight to Tarshish while asserting that, since God is merciful, it was inevitable that God would turn from the threatened calamities. He leaves the city and makes a shelter, waiting to see whether or not the city will be destroyed. God causes a plant (in Hebrew a kikayon) to grow over Jonah's shelter to give him some shade from the sun. Later, God causes a worm to bite the plant's root and it withers. Jonah, exposed to the full force of the sun, becomes faint and pleads for God to kill him.

But God said to Jonah: "Do you have a right to be angry about the vine?" And he said: "I do. I am angry enough to die."
But the LORD said: "You have been concerned about this vine, though you did not tend it or make it grow. It sprang up overnight, and died overnight.
But Nineveh has more than a hundred and twenty thousand people who cannot tell their right hand from their left, and many cattle as well. Should I not be concerned about that great city?"

— Jonah 4:9–11 (NIV)

== Religious views ==
=== In Judaism ===
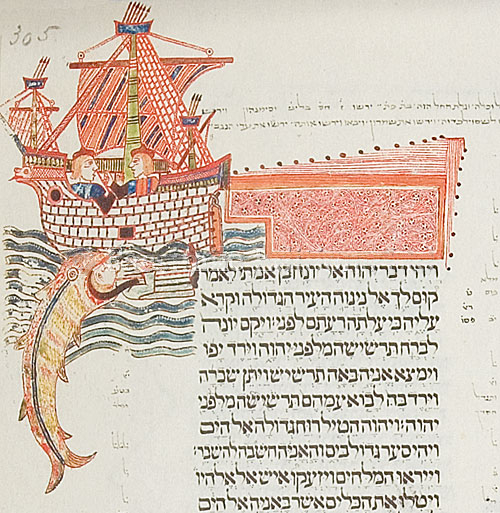
Illustration of Jonah being swallowed by the fish from the Kennicott Bible, folio 305r (1476), in the Bodleian Library, Oxford

The Book of Jonah (Hebrew: יונה, Yonah) is one of the twelve minor prophets included in the Hebrew Bible. According to one tradition, Jonah was the boy brought back to life by Elijah the prophet in 1 Kings. Another tradition holds that he was the son of the woman of Shunem brought back to life by Elisha in 2 Kings and that he is called the "son of Amittai" ('Truth') due to his mother's recognition of Elijah's identity as a prophet in 1 Kings. The Book of Jonah is read every year, in its original Hebrew and in its entirety, on Yom Kippur – the Day of Atonement – as the Haftarah at the afternoon mincha prayer. According to Rabbi Eliezer, the fish that swallowed Jonah was created in the primordial era and the inside of its mouth was like a synagogue; the fish's eyes were like windows and a pearl inside its mouth provided further illumination.

According to the Midrash, while Jonah was inside the fish, the fish told him that its life was nearly over because soon the Leviathan would eat them both. Jonah promised the fish that he would save them. Following Jonah's directions, the fish swam up alongside the Leviathan and Jonah threatened to leash the Leviathan by its tongue and let the other fish eat it. The Leviathan heard Jonah's threats, saw that he was circumcised, and realized that he was protected by the Lord, so it fled in terror, leaving Jonah and the fish alive.

The medieval Jewish scholar and rabbi Abraham ibn Ezra (1092–1167) argued against any literal interpretation of the Book of Jonah, stating that the "experiences of all the prophets except Moses were visions, not actualities." The later scholar Isaac Abarbanel (1437–1509), however, argued that Jonah could have easily survived in the belly of the fish for three days, because "after all, fetuses live nine months without access to fresh air".

Teshuva – the ability to repent and be forgiven by God – is a prominent idea in Jewish thought. This concept is developed in the Book of Jonah: Jonah, the son of truth (the name of his father Amitai in Hebrew means 'truth'), refuses to ask the people of Nineveh to repent. He seeks the truth only, and not forgiveness. When forced to go, his call is heard loud and clear, and the people of Nineveh repent ecstatically, "fasting, including the sheep", and the Jewish text is critical of this. The Book of Jonah also highlights the sometimes unstable relationship between two religious needs: comfort and truth.

Twelfth-century Jewish rabbi and explorer Petachiah of Regensburg visited Jonah's tomb during his visit to the Holy Land, and wrote: "There is a beautiful palace built over it. Near it is a pleasure garden wherein all kinds of fruit are found. The keeper of the pleasure garden is a Gentile. Nevertheless, when Gentiles come there he gives them no fruit, but when Jews come he gives them a friendly reception, saying, Jonah, son of Amittai, was a Jew, therefore it is due to you to partake of what is his, and then gives to the Jews to eat thereof." Petachiah did not provide details about the exact location of the tomb.

=== In Christianity ===
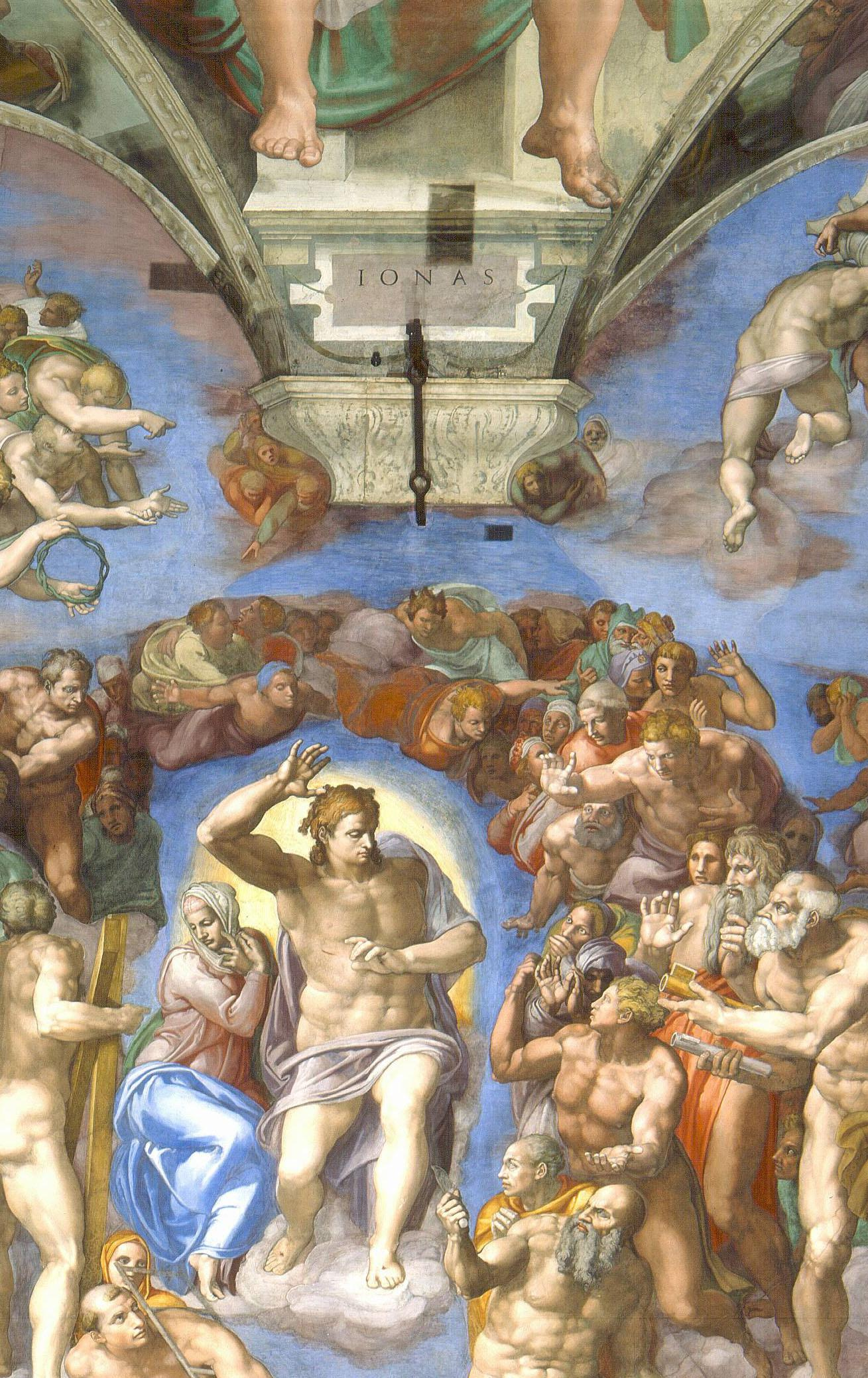
In his fresco The Last Judgment, Michelangelo depicted Christ below Jonah (IONAS) to qualify the prophet as his precursor.

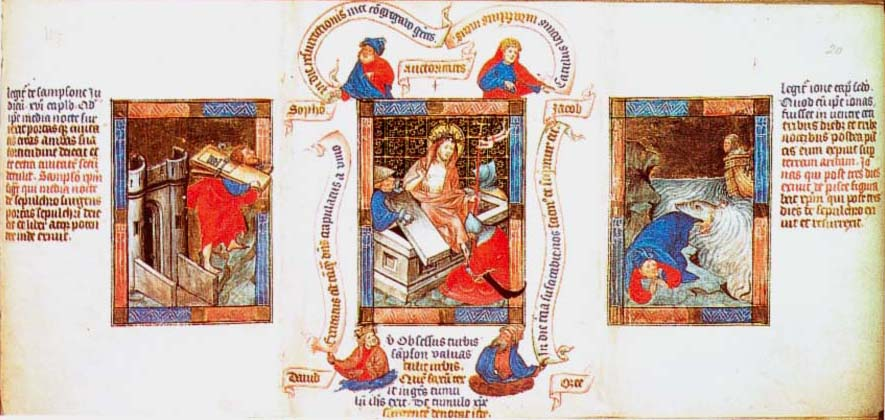
Christ rises from the tomb, alongside Jonah spit onto the beach.

==== In the Book of Tobit ====
Jonah is mentioned twice in the fourteenth chapter of the Vaticanus version of deuterocanonical Book of Tobit, the conclusion of which finds Tobit's son, Tobias, rejoicing at the news of Nineveh's destruction by Nebuchadnezzar and Ahasuerus in apparent fulfillment of Jonah's prophecy against the Assyrian capital. The Codex Sinaiticus version of the book, which is longer and aligns more closely with the Dead Sea Scrolls, refers to Nahum instead of Jonah, as well as Cyaxares instead of Nebuchadnezzar and Ahasuerus. This more reliable version of the story is the basis for most modern translations.

==== In the New Testament ====
In the New Testament, Jonah is mentioned in the gospels of Matthew and Luke. In Matthew, Jesus makes a reference to Jonah when he is asked for a sign by some of the scribes and the Pharisees. Jesus says that the sign will be the sign of Jonah: Jonah's restoration after three days and three night inside the great fish prefigures his own resurrection.

^{39}He answered, "A wicked and adulterous generation asks for a sign! But none will be given it except the sign of the prophet Jonah. ^{40}For as Jonah was three days and three nights in the belly of a huge fish, so the Son of Man will be three days and three nights in the heart of the earth. ^{41}The men of Nineveh will stand up at the judgment with this generation and condemn it; for they repented at the preaching of Jonah, and now something greater than Jonah is here."

— Gospel of Matthew, 12:39–41 (New International Version)

In Luke, Jesus makes a reference to Jonah in an eschatological prophecy, after a woman in the crowd suddenly exclaims, "Blessed is the womb that bare thee, and the paps which thou hast sucked" (Luke 11:27 - King James Version):

^{29}And when the people were gathered thick together, he began to say, "This is an evil generation: they seek a sign; and there shall no sign be given it, but the sign of Jonas the prophet. ^{30}For as Jonas was a sign unto the Ninevites, so shall also the Son of man be to this generation. ^{31}The queen of the south shall rise up in the judgment with the men of this generation, and condemn them: for she came from the utmost parts of the earth to hear the wisdom of Solomon; and, behold, a greater than Solomon is here. ^{32}The men of Nineve shall rise up in the judgment with this generation, and shall condemn it: for they repented at the preaching of Jonas; and, behold, a greater than Jonas is here. ^{33}No man, when he hath lighted a candle, putteth it in a secret place, neither under a bushel, but on a candlestick, that they which come in may see the light. ^{34}The light of the body is the eye: therefore when thine eye is single, thy whole body also is full of light; but when thine eye is evil, thy body also is full of darkness. ^{35}Take heed therefore that the light which is in thee be not darkness. ^{36}If thy whole body therefore be full of light, having no part dark, the whole shall be full of light, as when the bright shining of a candle doth give thee light."

— Gospel of Luke, 11:29–36 (King James Version)

Oh Jonah!
"Oh Jonah!", a gospel summary of the Book of Jonah, sung by the Golden Jubilee Quartet

Jonah is regarded as a saint by a number of Christian denominations. His feast day in the Roman Catholic Church is on 21 September, according to the Martyrologium Romanum. On the Eastern Orthodox liturgical calendar, Jonah's feast day is on 22 September (for those churches which follow the traditional Julian calendar; 22 September currently falls in October on the modern Gregorian calendar). In the Armenian Apostolic Church, moveable feasts are held in commemoration of Jonah as a single prophet and as one of the Twelve Minor Prophets. Jonah's mission to the Ninevites is commemorated by the Fast of Nineveh in Syriac and Oriental Orthodox Churches. Jonah is commemorated as a prophet in the Calendar of Saints of the Missouri Synod of the Lutheran Church on 22 September.

Christian theologians have traditionally interpreted Jonah as a type for Jesus Christ. Jonah being in swallowed by the giant fish was regarded as a foreshadowing of Jesus's crucifixion and Jonah emerging from the fish after three days was seen as a parallel for Jesus emerging from the tomb after three days. Saint Jerome equates Jonah with Jesus's more nationalistic side, and justifies Jonah's actions by arguing that "Jonah acts thus as a patriot, not so much that he hates the Ninevites, as that he does not want to destroy his own people."

==== Post-Biblical views ====
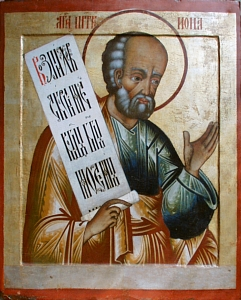
Russian Orthodox icon of Jonah, 16th century (Iconostasis of Kizhi monastery, Karelia, Russia)

Other Christian interpreters, including Saint Augustine and Martin Luther, have taken a directly opposite approach, regarding Jonah as the epitome of envy and jealousness, which they regarded as inherent characteristics of the Jewish people. Luther likewise concludes that the kikayon (plant) represents Judaism, and that the worm which devours it represents Christ. Luther also questioned the idea that the Book of Jonah was ever intended as literal history, commenting that he found it hard to believe that anyone would have interpreted it as such if it were not in the Bible. Luther's antisemitic interpretation of Jonah remained the prevailing interpretation among German Protestants throughout early modern history. J. D. Michaelis comments that "the meaning of the fable hits you right between the eyes", and concludes that the Book of Jonah is a polemic against "the Israelite people's hate and envy towards all the other nations of the earth." Albert Eichhorn was a strong supporter of Michaelis's interpretation.

John Calvin and John Hooper regarded the Book of Jonah as a warning to all those who might attempt to flee from the wrath of God. While Luther had been careful to maintain that the Book of Jonah was not written by Jonah, Calvin declared that the Book of Jonah was Jonah's personal confession of guilt. Calvin sees Jonah's time inside the fish's belly as equivalent to the fires of Hell, intended to correct Jonah and set him on the path of righteousness. Also, unlike Luther, Calvin finds fault with all the characters in the story, describing the sailors on the boat as "hard and iron-hearted, like Cyclops'", the penitence of the Ninevites as "untrained", and the king of Nineveh as a "novice". Hooper, on the other hand, sees Jonah as the archetypal dissident and the ship he is cast out from as a symbol of the state. Hooper deplores such dissidents, decrying: "Can you live quietly with so many Jonasses? Nay then, throw them into the sea!" In the eighteenth century, German professors were forbidden from teaching that the Book of Jonah was anything other than a literal, historical account.

=== In Islam ===
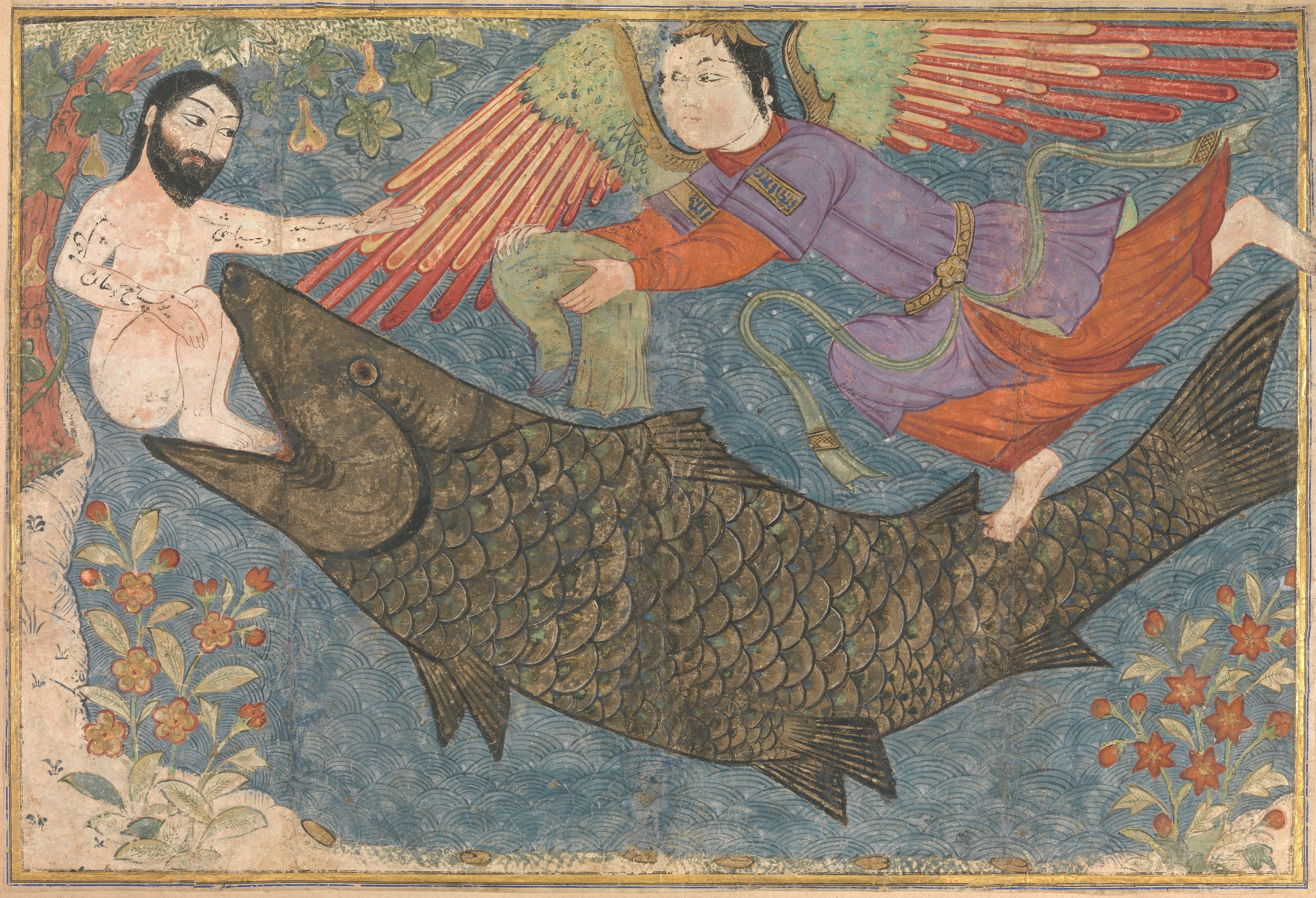
Jonah and the giant fish in the Jami' al-tawarikh (c. 1400), Metropolitan Museum of Art

==== Quran ====
Jonah (Arabic: يُونُس, romanized: Yūnus) is the title of the tenth chapter of the Quran. Yūnus is traditionally viewed as highly important in Islam as a prophet who was faithful to God and delivered His messages. Jonah is the only one of Judaism's Twelve Minor Prophets to be named in the Quran. In Quran 21:87 and 68:48, Jonah is called Dhul-Nūn (Arabic: ذُو ٱلنُّوْن; meaning 'The One of the Fish'). In 4:163 and 6:86, he is referred to as "an apostle of Allah". Surah 37:139–148 retells the full story of Jonah:

And verily, Jonah was among the messengers.
[Mention] when he ran away to the laden ship.
Then (to save it from sinking) he drew straws (with other passengers). He lost and was thrown overboard.
Then the whale engulfed him while he was blameworthy.
Had it not been that he (repented and) glorified Allah,
He would certainly have remained inside the Fish till the Day of Resurrection.
But We cast him onto the open (shore), (totally) worn out,
and caused a squash plant to grow over him.
We (later) sent him (back) to (his city of) at least one hundred thousand people,
And they believed, so We allowed them enjoyment for a while.

— Surah As-Saaffat 37:139

The Quran never mentions Jonah's father, but Muslim tradition teaches that Jonah was from the tribe of Benjamin and that his father was Amittai.

==== Hadiths ====
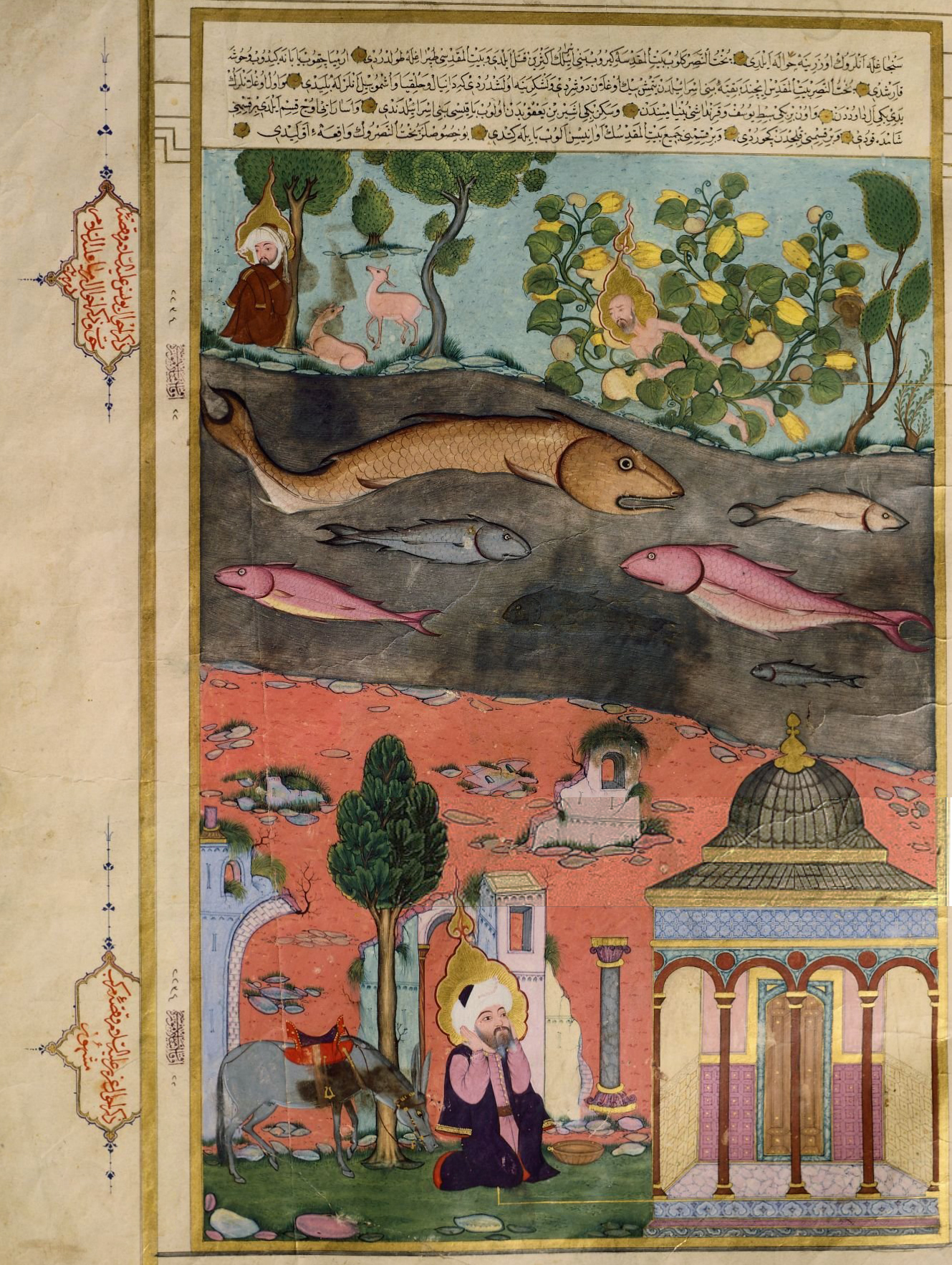
Jonah trying to hide his nakedness in the midst of bushes; Jeremiah in the wilderness (top left); Uzeyr awakened after the destruction of Jerusalem. Zubdat al-Tawarikh, Ottoman miniature, 1583.

Jonah is also mentioned in a few incidents during the lifetime of Muhammad. Quraysh sent their servant, Addas, to serve him grapes for sustenance. Muhammad asked Addas where he was from and the servant replied Nineveh. "The town of Jonah the just, son of Amittai!" Muhammad exclaimed. Addas was shocked because he knew that the pagan Arabs had no knowledge of the prophet Jonah. He then asked how Muhammad knew of this man. "We are brothers", Muhammad replied. "Jonah was a Prophet of God and I, too, am a Prophet of God." Addas immediately accepted Islam and kissed the hands and feet of Muhammad.

One of the sayings attributed to Muhammad, in the collection of Imam Bukhari, says that Muhammad said "One should not say that I am better than Jonah". Umayya ibn Abi al-Salt, an older contemporary of Muhammad, taught that, had Jonah not prayed to Allah, he would have remained trapped inside the fish until Judgement Day, but, because of his prayer, Jonah "stayed only a few days within the belly of the fish".

The ninth-century Persian historian Al-Tabari records that, while Jonah was inside the fish, "none of his bones or members were injured". Al-Tabari also writes that Allah made the body of the fish transparent, allowing Jonah to see the "wonders of the deep" and that Jonah heard all the fish singing praises to Allah. Kisai Marvazi, a tenth-century poet, records that Jonah's father was seventy years old when Jonah was born and that he died soon afterwards, leaving Jonah's mother with nothing but a wooden spoon, which turned out to be a cornucopia.

==== Claimed tombs ====
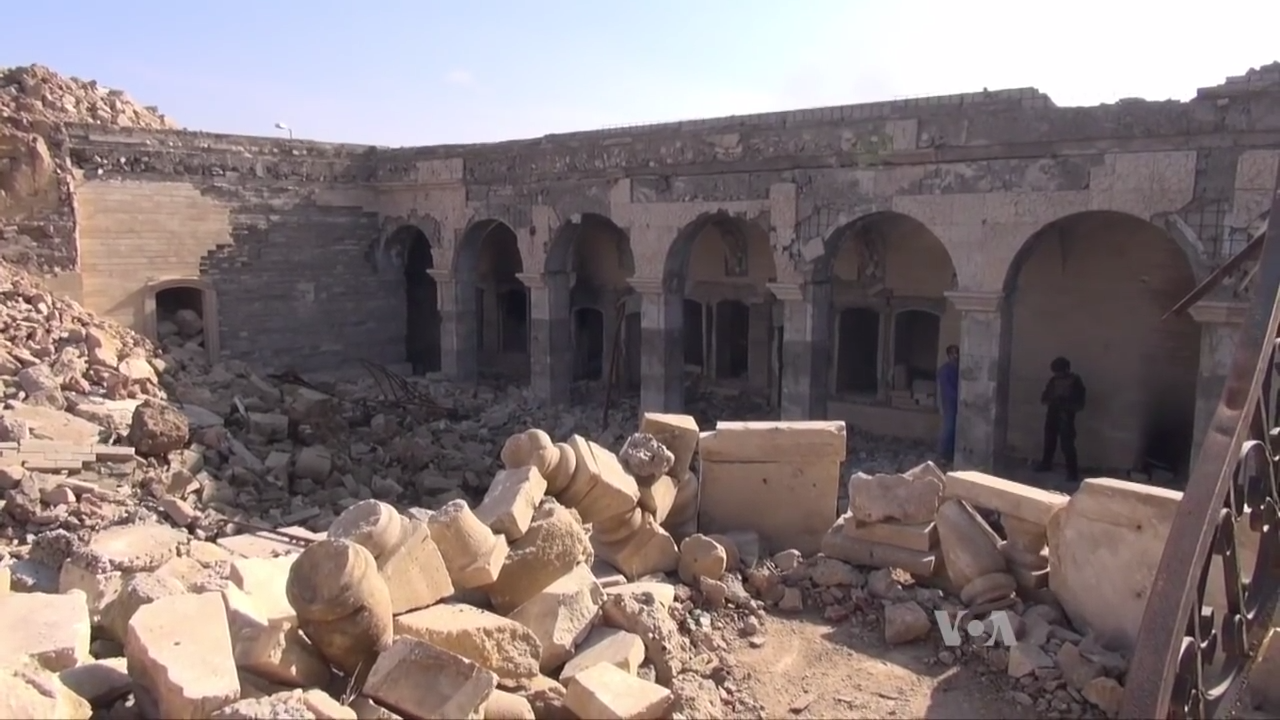
Photograph of the ruins of the mosque of Yunus, following its destruction by ISIL

Nineveh's current location is marked by excavations of five gates, parts of walls on four sides, and two large mounds: the hill of Kuyunjik and hill of Nabi Yunus. The Al-Nabi Yunus Mosque resting upon Nabi Yunus was dedicated to the prophet Jonah and contained a shrine, which was revered by both Muslims and Christians as the site of Jonah's tomb. The tomb was a popular pilgrimage site and a symbol of unity to Jews, Christians, and Muslims across the Middle East. On July 24, 2014, the Islamic State of Iraq and the Levant (ISIL) destroyed the mosque containing the tomb as part of a campaign to destroy religious sanctuaries it deemed to be idolatrous. After Mosul was taken back from ISIL in January 2017, an ancient Assyrian palace built by Esarhaddon dating to around the first half of the 7th century BCE was discovered beneath the ruined mosque. ISIL had plundered the palace of items to sell on the black market, but some of the artifacts that were more difficult to transport still remained in place.

Other reputed locations of Jonah's tomb include:

- the Arab village of Mashhad, located on the ancient site of Gath-hepher in Israel;
- the Nabi Yunis mosque of the Palestinian town of Halhul, in the West Bank, 5 km (3.1 mi) north of Hebron, was purportedly built over Jonah's tomb;
- a sanctuary near the city of Sarafand (Sarepta) in Lebanon;
- a hill now called Giv'at Yonah, "Jonah's Hill", at the northern edge of the Israeli town of Ashdod, at a site covered by a modern lighthouse;
- a "tomb of Jonah" in the city of Diyarbakir, Turkey, located behind the mihrab at Fatih Pasha Mosque – Evliya Çelebi states in his Seyahatname that he visited the tombs of prophet Jonah and prophet George in the city.

== Scholarly interpretations ==
The story of a man surviving after being swallowed by a whale or giant fish is classified in the catalogue of folktale types as ATU 1889G.

=== Historicity ===
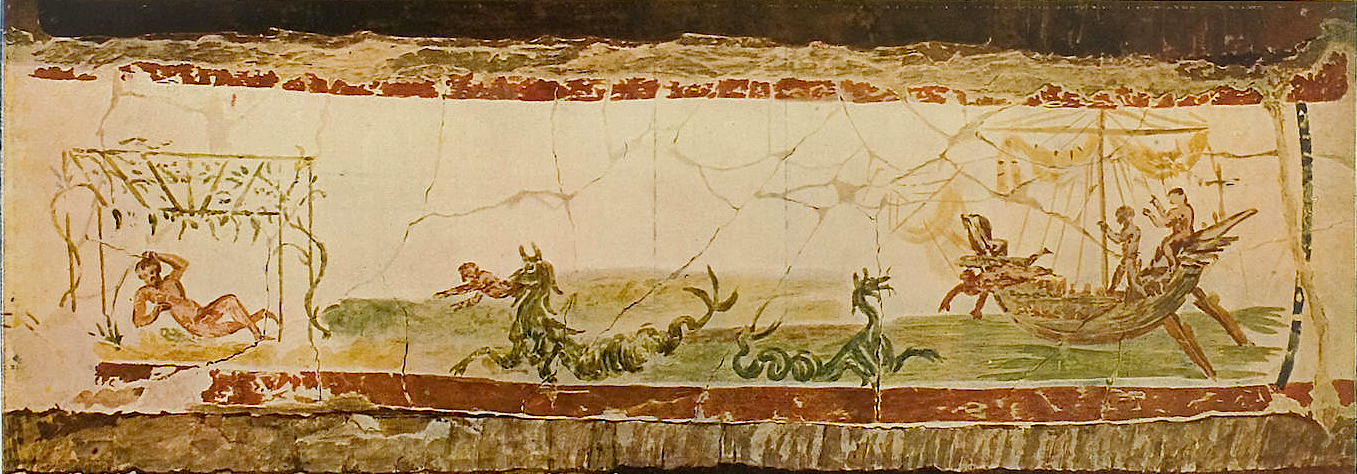
Jonah and the sea monster, from Christian artwork in Roman catacombs at the end of 2nd century CE. From right to left: Johah jumps off the ship, where a sea monster waits; he is eaten (or spit out) by that sea monster; Johah rests on the beach after release from the monster's belly. The sea monster drawn by the Roman Christians resembles a hippocampus.

Many Biblical scholars hold that the contents of the Book of Jonah are ahistorical. Although the prophet Jonah allegedly lived in the eighth century BCE, the Book of Jonah was written centuries later during the time of the Achaemenid Empire. The Hebrew used in the Book of Jonah shows strong influences from Aramaic and the cultural practices described in it match those of the Achaemenid Persians. Some scholars regard the Book of Jonah as an intentional work of parody or satire. If this is the case, then it was probably admitted into the canon of the Hebrew Bible by sages who misunderstood its satirical nature and mistakenly interpreted it as a serious prophetic work.

Jonah himself may have been a historical prophet; he is briefly mentioned in the Second Book of Kings:

He restored the border of Israel from the entrance of Hamath unto the sea of the Arabah, according to the word of the LORD, the God of Israel, which He spoke by the hand of His servant Jonah the son of Amittai, the prophet, who was of Gath-hepher.

— 2 Kings

In a lecture delivered in 1978 and published in 1979, Assyriologist Donald Wiseman defended the plausibility of many aspects of the story, supporting "the tradition that many features in the narrative exhibit an intimate and accurate knowledge of Assyria which could stem from an historical event as early as the eighth century B.C.", concluding that "the story of Jonah need not be considered as a late story or parable".

=== Parodic elements ===
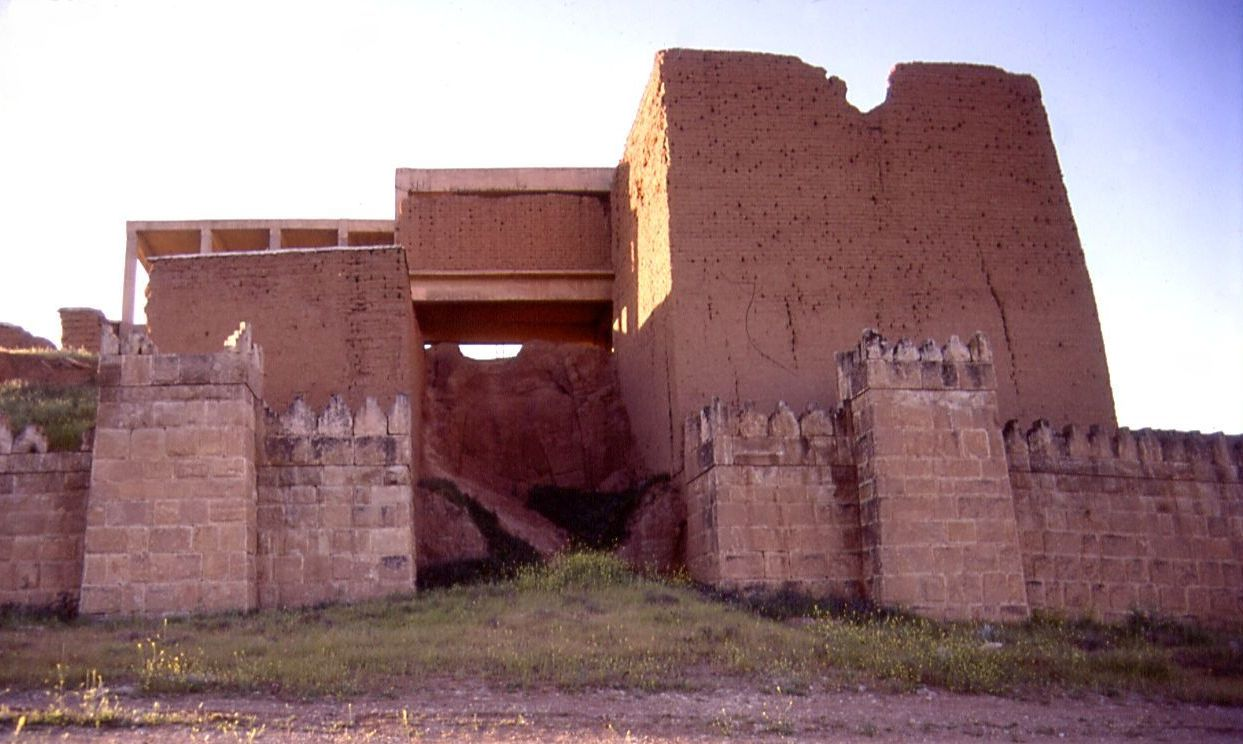
Modern restoration of the Adad gate at Nineveh in a photograph taken prior to the gate's total destruction by ISIL in April 2016. The Book of Jonah exaggerates the size of Nineveh far beyond what it actually was historically.

The views expressed by Jonah in the Book of Jonah are a parody of views held by members of Jewish society at the time when it was written. The primary target of the satire may have been a faction whom Morton Smith calls "Separationists", who believed that God would destroy those who disobeyed him, that sinful cities would be obliterated, and that God's mercy did not extend to those outside the Abrahamic covenant. McKenzie and Graham remark that "Jonah is in some ways the most 'orthodox' of Israelite theologians – to make a theological point." Jonah's statements throughout the book are characterized by their militancy, but his name ironically means "dove", a bird which the ancient Israelites associated with peace.

Jonah's rejection of God's commands is a parody of the obedience of the prophets described in other Old Testament writings. The king of Nineveh's instant repentance parodies the rulers throughout the other writings of the Old Testament who disregard prophetic warnings, such as Ahab and Zedekiah. The readiness to worship God displayed by the sailors on the ship and the people of Nineveh contrasts ironically with Jonah's own reluctance, as does Jonah's greater love for kikayon providing him shade than for all the people in Nineveh.

The Book of Jonah also employs elements of literary absurdism; it exaggerates the size of the city of Nineveh to an implausible degree and incorrectly refers to the administrator of the city as a "king". According to scholars, no human could realistically survive for three days inside a fish, and the description of the livestock in Nineveh fasting alongside their owners is "silly". Some of these points are countered in the aforementioned lecture of Donald Wiseman.

The motif of a protagonist being swallowed by a giant fish or whale became a stock trope of later satirical writings. Similar incidents are recounted in Lucian of Samosata's A True Story, which was written in the second century CE, and in the novel Baron Munchausen's Narrative of his Marvellous Travels and Campaigns in Russia, published by Rudolf Erich Raspe in 1785.

== The fish ==
=== Translation ===
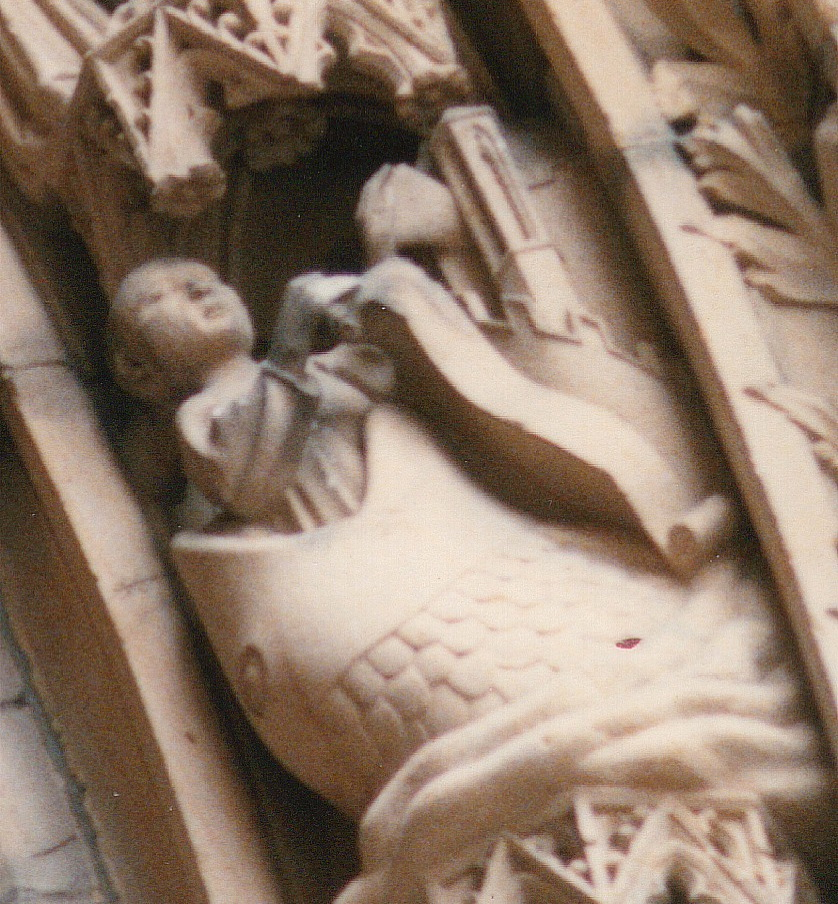
Depiction of Jonah and the "great fish" on the south doorway of the Gothic-era Dom St. Peter, in Worms, Germany

Though art and culture often depicts Jonah's fish as a whale, the Hebrew text refers to no marine species in particular, simply saying "great fish" or "big fish". Jonah 2:1 While some biblical scholars suggest the size and habits of the great white shark correspond better to the representations of Jonah's experiences, normally an adult human is too large to be swallowed whole. The development of whaling from the 18th century onwards made it clear that most, if not all, species of whale are incapable of swallowing a human, leading to much controversy about the veracity of the biblical story of Jonah.

In Jonah 2:1 (1:17 in English translations), the Hebrew text reads dag gadol (דג גדול) or, in the Hebrew Masoretic Text, dāḡ gāḏōl (דָּ֣ג גָּד֔וֹל), which means "great fish". The Septuagint translates this phrase into Greek as kētei megalōi (κήτει μεγάλῳ), meaning "huge fish". In Greek mythology, the same word meaning "fish" (kêtos) is used to describe the sea monster slain by the hero Perseus that nearly devoured the Princess Andromeda. Jerome later translated this phrase as piscis grandis in his Latin Vulgate. He translated koilia kétous, however, as ventre ceti in Matthew 12:40: this second case occurs only in this verse of the New Testament.

At some point cetus became synonymous with "whale" (the study of whales is now called cetology). In his 1534 translation, William Tyndale translated the phrase in Jonah 2:1 as "greate fyshe" and the word kétos (Greek) or cetus (Latin) in Matthew 12:40 as "whale". Tyndale's translation was later incorporated into the King James Version of 1611. Since then, the "great fish" in Jonah 2 has been most often interpreted as a whale. In English some translations use the word "whale" for Matthew 12:40, while others use "sea creature" or "big fish".

=== Scientific speculation ===
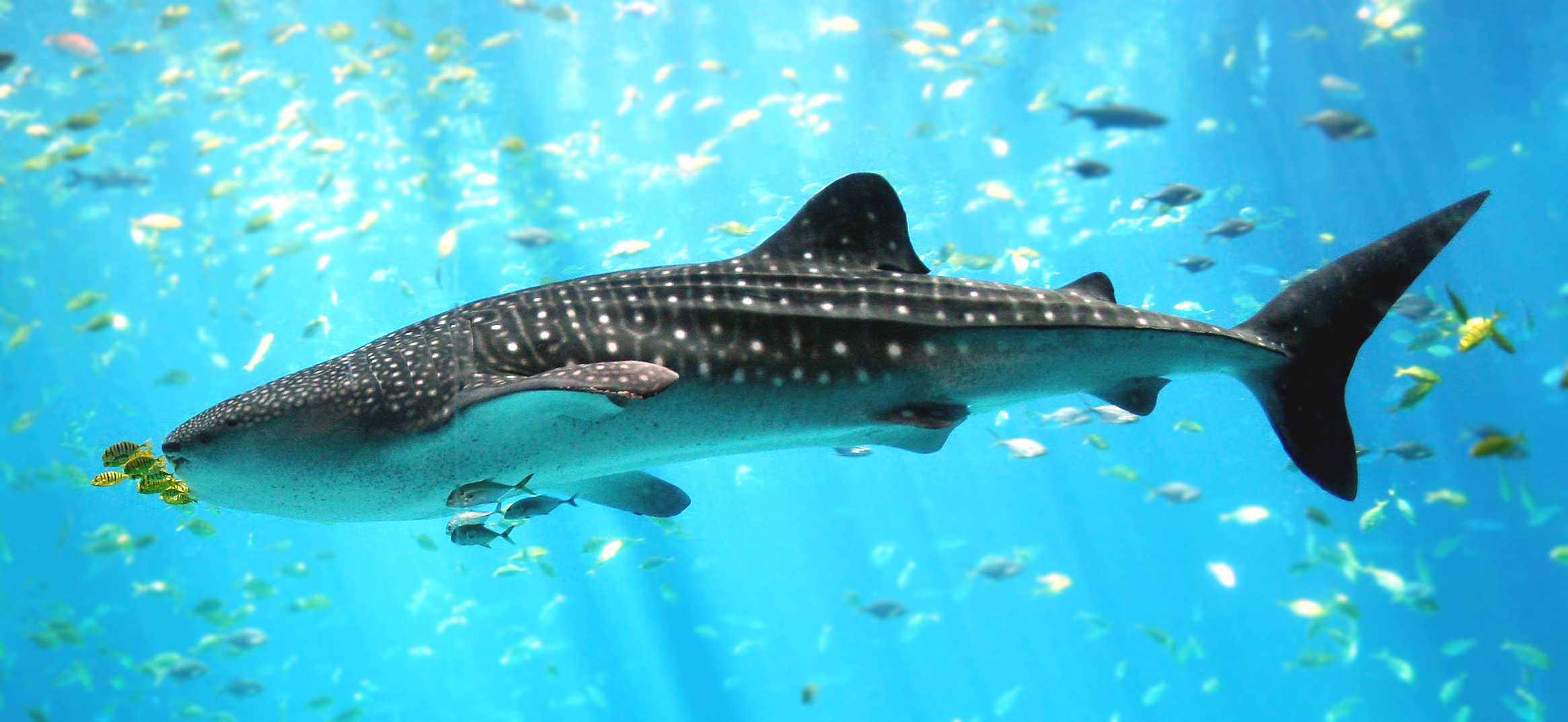
Photograph of a whale shark, the largest known species of fish

In the seventeenth and eighteenth centuries, naturalists, interpreting the Jonah story as a historical account, became obsessed with trying to identify the exact species of the fish that swallowed Jonah. In the mid-nineteenth century, Edward Bouverie Pusey, professor of Hebrew at Oxford University, claimed that the Book of Jonah must have been authored by Jonah himself and argued that the fish story must be historically true, or else it would not have been included in the Bible. Pusey attempted to scientifically catalogue the fish, hoping to "shame those who speak of the miracle of Jonah's preservation in the fish as a thing less credible than any of God's other miraculous doings".

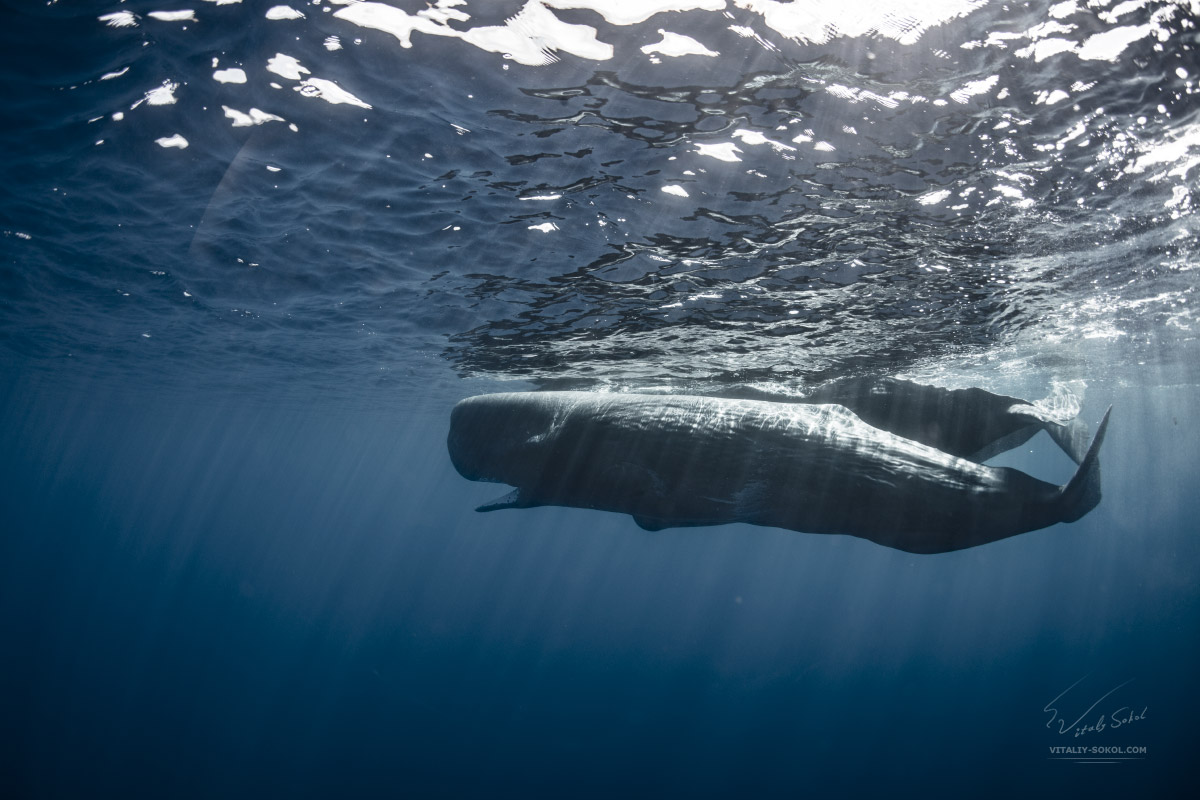
Photograph of a sperm whale, the largest toothed predator and one of the largest extant species of whales

The debate over the fish in the Book of Jonah played a major role during Clarence Darrow's cross-examination of William Jennings Bryan at the Scopes trial in 1925. Darrow asked Bryan, "When you read that ... the whale swallowed Jonah ... how do you literally interpret that?". Bryan replied that he believed in "a God who can make a whale and can make a man and make both of them do what He pleases." Bryan ultimately admitted that it was necessary to interpret the Bible, and is generally regarded as having come off looking like a "buffoon".

The largest of all whales – blue whales – are baleen whales which eat plankton; and "it is commonly said that this species would be choked if it attempted to swallow a herring." The largest of all fishes – the whale shark – has a large mouth, but its throat is only four inches wide, with a sharp elbow or bend behind the opening, such that not even a human arm would be able to pass through it. Therefore, Jonah could not have been swallowed by a whale shark.

Sperm whales, however, appear to be a different matter: They regularly eat giant squid, so presumably one could swallow a human. Similar to a cow, sperm whales have four-chambered stomachs. The first chamber has no gastric juices but has muscular walls to crush its food. On the other hand, it is not possible to breathe inside the sperm whale's stomach because there is no air (but probably methane instead). A 2023 novel by Daniel Kraus, Whalefall, explores the idea of a man surviving being swallowed by a sperm whale, but with an oxygen tank.

== Cultural influence ==
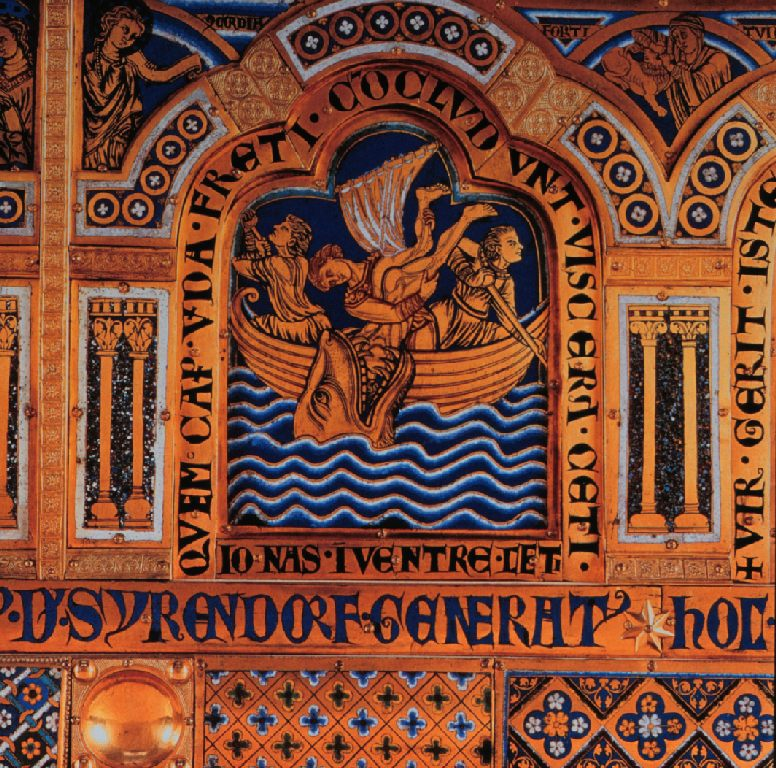
Depiction of Jonah in a champlevé enamel (1181) by Nicholas of Verdun in the Verduner altar at Klosterneuburg abbey, Austria

In Turkish, "Jonah's fish" (yunus balığı) is the term used for dolphins. A long-established expression among sailors uses the term "a Jonah" to mean a sailor/passenger whose presence on board brings bad luck and endangers the ship. Later, this meaning was extended to "a person who carries a jinx, one who will bring bad luck to any enterprise."

Despite its brevity, the Book of Jonah has been adapted numerous times in literature and in popular culture. In Herman Melville's Moby-Dick (1851), Father Mapple delivers a sermon on the Book of Jonah. Mapple asks why Jonah does not show remorse for disobeying God while he is inside of the fish. He concludes that Jonah admirably understands that "his dreadful punishment is just." Carlo Collodi's The Adventures of Pinocchio (1883) features the title character and his father Geppetto being swallowed by "the Terrible Dogfish", an allusion to the story of Jonah. Walt Disney's 1940 film adaptation of the novel retains this allusion. The story of Jonah was adapted into Phil Vischer and Mike Nawrocki's animated film Jonah: A VeggieTales Movie (2002). In the film, Jonah (portrayed by Archibald Asparagus) is swallowed by a gargantuan whale.

== Suggested connections to legends ==
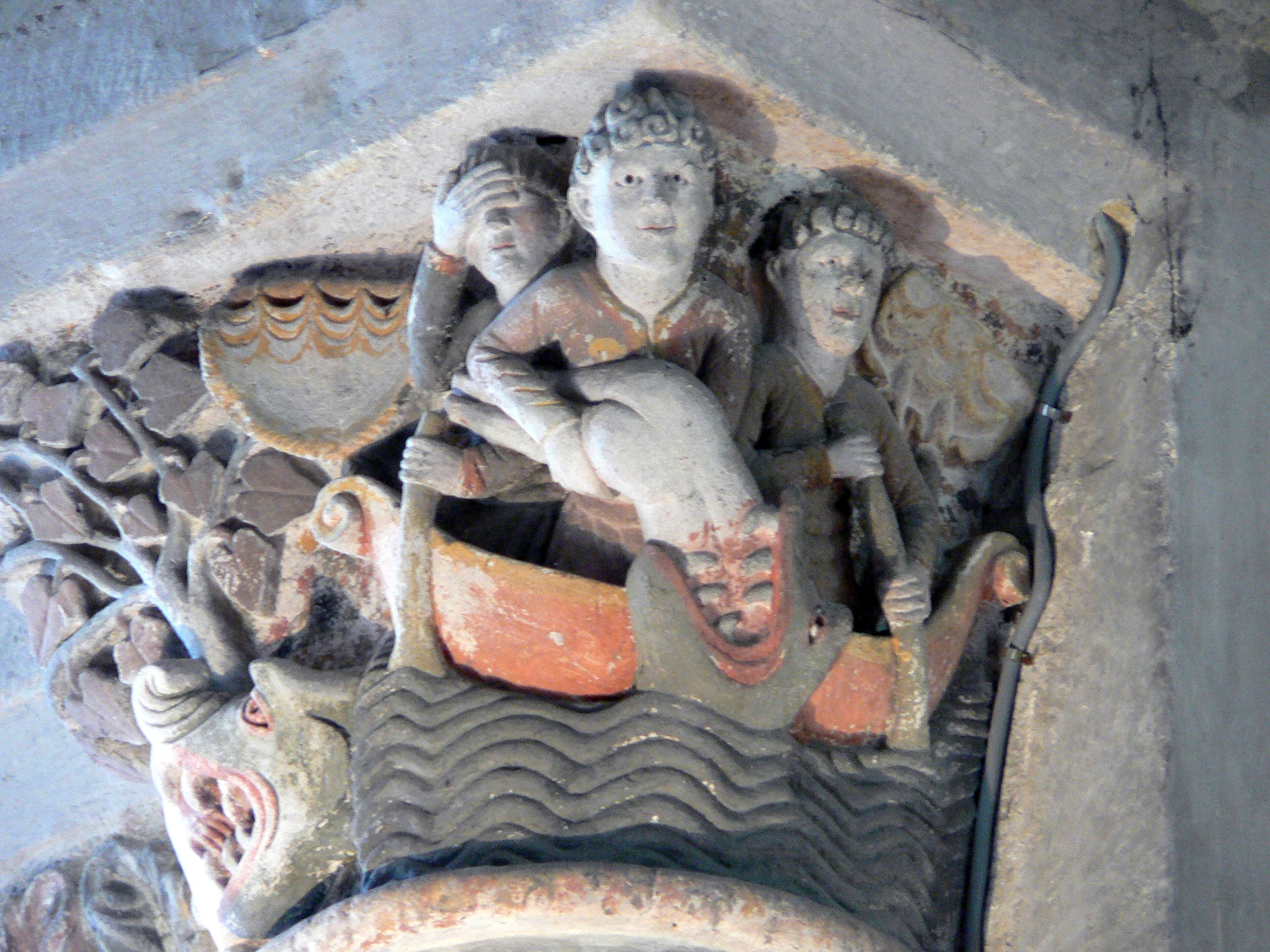
Jonah being swallowed by a great toothed sea-monster. Sculpted column capital from the nave of the abbey-church in Mozac, France, 12th century.

=== Epic of Gilgamesh ===
Joseph Campbell suggests that the story of Jonah parallels a scene from the Epic of Gilgamesh, in which Gilgamesh obtains a plant from the bottom of the sea. In the Book of Jonah, a worm (in Hebrew tola'ath, "maggot") bites the shade-giving plant's root causing it to wither; whereas in the Epic of Gilgamesh, Gilgamesh ties stones to his feet and plucks his plant from the floor of the sea. Once he returns to the shore, the rejuvenating plant is eaten by a serpent.

=== Jason (Greek mythology) ===
Campbell also noted several similarities between the story of Jonah and that of Jason in Greek mythology. The Greek rendering of the name Jonah is Jonas (Ἰωνᾶς), which differs from Jason (Ἰάσων) only in the order of sounds – both os are omegas suggesting that Jason may have been confused with Jonah. Gildas Hamel, drawing on the Book of Jonah and Greco-Roman sources – including Greek vases and the accounts of Apollonius of Rhodes, Gaius Valerius Flaccus and Orphic Argonautica – identifies a number of shared motifs, including the names of the heroes, the presence of a dove, the idea of "fleeing" like the wind and causing a storm, the attitude of the sailors, the presence of a sea-monster or dragon threatening the hero or swallowing him, and the form and the word used for the "gourd" (kikayon). Hamel takes the view that it was the Hebrew author who reacted to and adapted this mythological material to communicate his own quite different message.

== See also ==
- Aquanaut, a person who stays underwater for a long time
- Jonah in Islam
- Biblical and Quranic narratives
- Jonah on the Sistine Chapel ceiling
- Legends and the Quran
- Prophets of Islam
- Qisas Al-Anbiya
