= Book of Jonah =

Book of the Bible

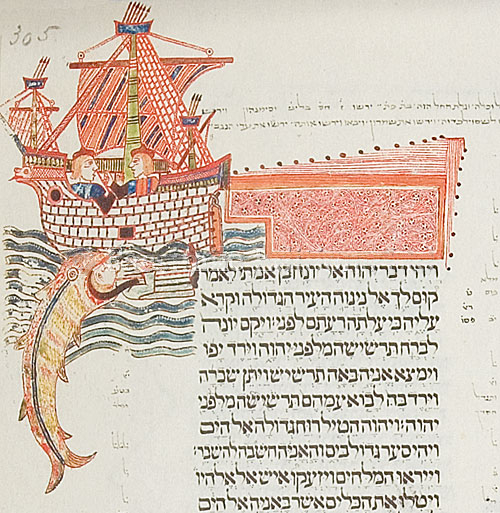
Illustrated Jonah from the 15th-century Kennicott Bible

The Book of Jonah is one of the twelve minor prophets of the Nevi'im ('Prophets') in the Jewish Hebrew Bible, and an individual book in the Christian Old Testament, where it has four chapters. The book tells of a Hebrew prophet named Jonah, son of Amittai, who is sent by God to prophesy the destruction of Nineveh, but attempts to escape his divine mission.

The story has a long interpretive history and has become well known through popular children's stories. In Judaism, it is the Haftarah portion read during the afternoon of Yom Kippur to instill reflection on God's willingness to forgive those who repent, and it remains a popular story among Christians. The story is also retold in the Quran.

Mainstream Bible scholars generally regard the story of the Book of Jonah as fictional, and often at least partially satirical. Most scholars consider the Book of Jonah to have been composed long after the events it describes due to its use of words and motifs exclusive to Aramaic sources of the postexilic period.

== Date ==
The prophet Jonah (Hebrew: יוֹנָה, Yonā) is mentioned in 2 Kings 14:25, which places Jonah's life during the reign of Jeroboam II, King of Israel, (786–746 BCE), but the book of Jonah itself does not name a king or give any other details that would give the story a firm date. Most scholars consider the Book of Jonah to have been composed long after the events it describes due to its use of words and motifs exclusive to postexilic Aramaic sources. A later date is sometimes proposed, with Katherine Dell arguing for the Hellenistic period (332–167 BCE).

Evangelical Assyriologist Donald Wiseman takes issue with the idea that the story is late (or a parable). Among other arguments he mentions that the "Legends of Agade" (see Sargon of Akkad and Rabisu) date to the time of the Old Babylonian Empire, though later versions "usually taken as a late composition, propagandistic fairy tale or historical romance can now, on the basis of new discoveries of earlier sources, be shown to be based on a serious and reliable historical record".

== Narrative ==
Unlike the other Minor Prophets, the book of Jonah is almost entirely narrative with the exception of the psalm in the second chapter. The actual prophetic word against Nineveh is given only in passing through the narrative. The story of Jonah has a setting, characters, a plot, and themes; it also relies heavily on such literary devices as irony.

== Chapter and verse divisions ==
The original text was written in Hebrew. Chapters 1 and 2 are divided differently in the Hebrew and English versions: verse 2:1 in the Hebrew version is equivalent to Jonah 1:17 in the English version.

== Outline ==
An outline of the book of Jonah:

1. Jonah flees his mission (chapters 1–2)
  1. Jonah's disobedience, and its consequences (1:1–17)
  2. Jonah's deliverance and thanksgiving (2:2–9)
2. Jonah fulfills his mission (chapters 3–4)
  1. Jonah's obedience and Nineveh's repentance (3:1–10)
  2. Jonah's displeasure at the Lord's salvation.

=== Summary ===
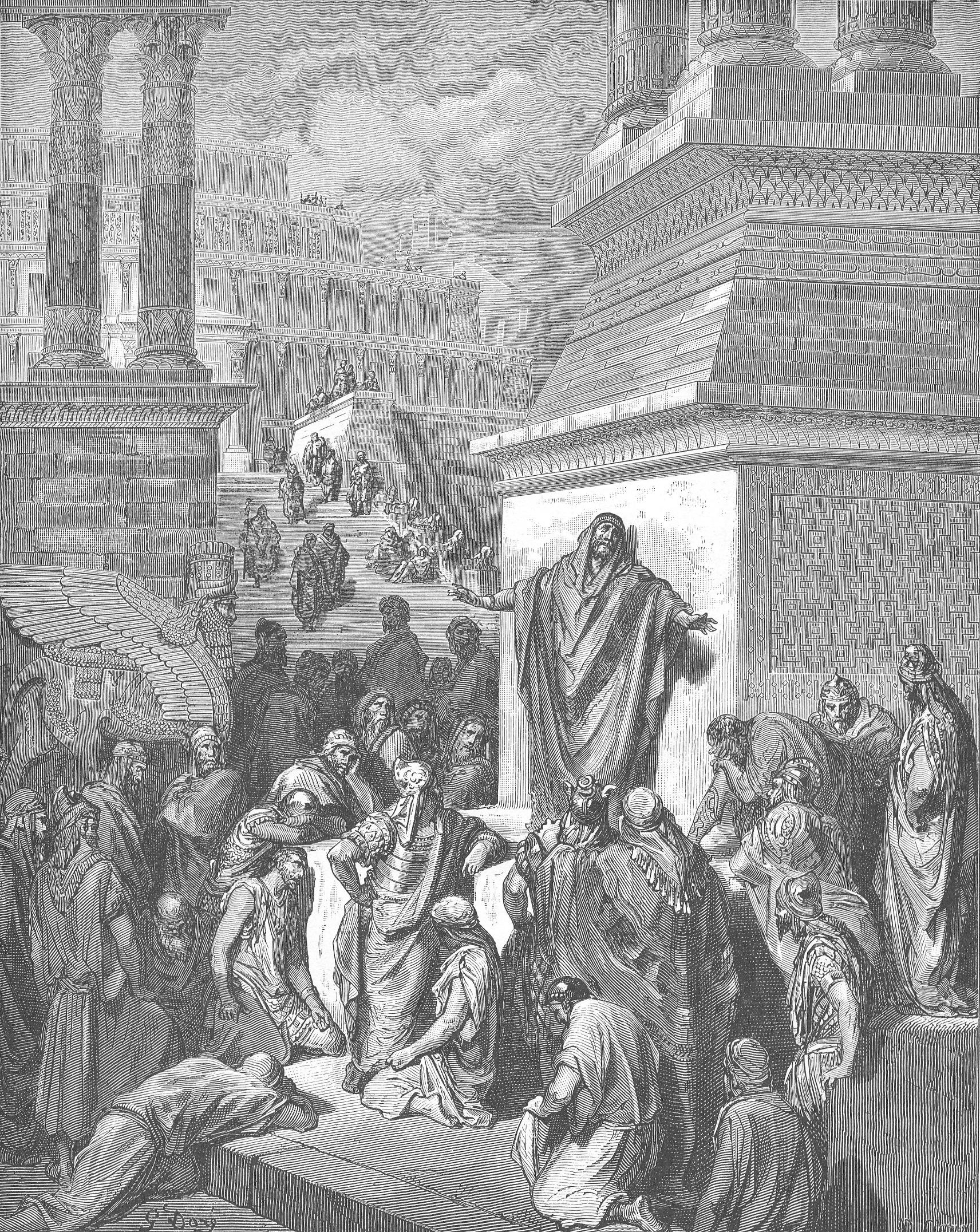
Jonah Preaching to the Ninevites (1866) by Gustave Doré

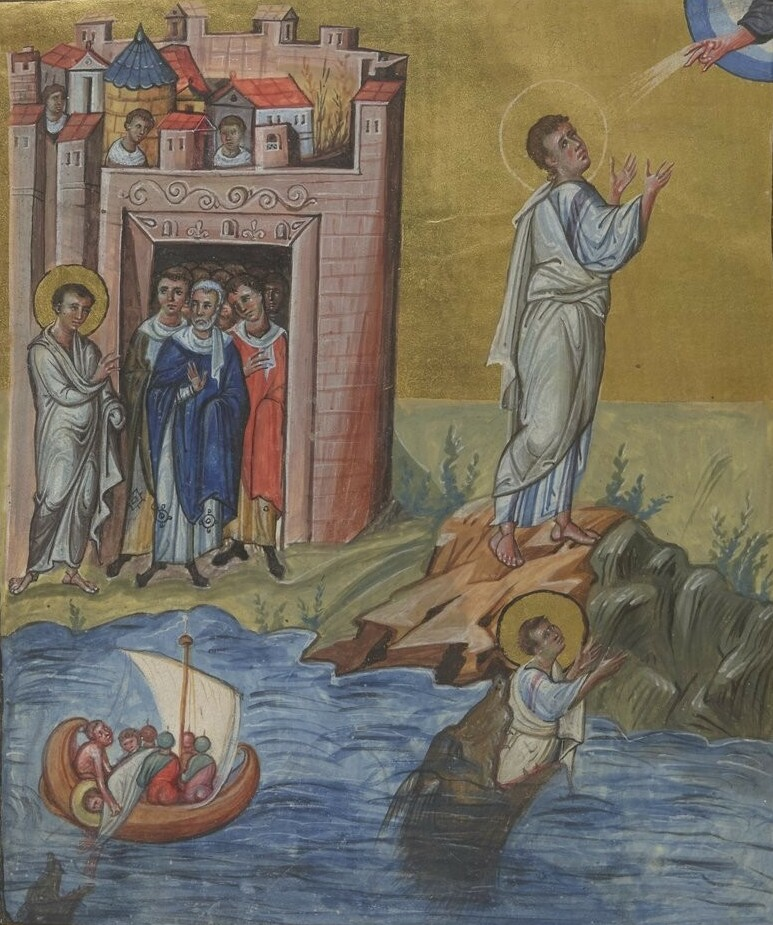
Jonah in four scenes: bottom left Jonah thrown into the sea by the crew of the boat which was to take him to Tarsis, bottom right, Jonah praying in the mouth of the whale, top left, Jonah preaching to the people of Nineveh outside the city gates, and top right, Jonah praying to God on a rock. Paris Psalter, f. 431v.

Jonah is the central character in the Book of Jonah, in which God ("the LORD") commands him to go to the city of Nineveh to prophesy against it for their great wickedness against God. However, Jonah instead attempts to run from God by going to Jaffa and sailing to Tarshish. A huge storm arises and the sailors, realizing that it is no ordinary storm, cast lots and discover that Jonah is to blame. Jonah admits this and states that if he is thrown overboard, the storm will cease. The sailors refuse to do this and continue rowing, but all their efforts fail and they are eventually forced to throw Jonah overboard. As a result, the storm calms and the sailors then offer sacrifices to God. Jonah is miraculously saved by being swallowed by a "great fish", in whose belly he spends three days and three nights.

While inside the great fish, Jonah prays to God in thanksgiving and commits to paying what he has vowed. Jonah's prayer has been compared with some of the Psalms, and with the Song of Hannah in 1 Samuel 2:1-10.

God then commands the fish to vomit Jonah out.

In chapter 3, God once again commands Jonah to travel to Nineveh and to prophesy to its inhabitants. This time he obeys God's command, and goes into the city, crying, "In forty days Nineveh shall be overthrown." After Jonah has walked across Nineveh, the people of Nineveh begin to believe his word and proclaim a fast. The king of Nineveh then puts on sackcloth and sits in ashes, making a proclamation which decrees fasting, the wearing of sackcloth, prayer, and repentance. God sees their repentant hearts and spares the city at that time. The entire city is humbled and broken, with the people (and even the animals) in sackcloth and ashes.

In chapter 4, displeased by the Ninevites' repentance, Jonah refers to his earlier flight to Tarshish while asserting that, since God is merciful, it was inevitable that God would turn from the threatened calamities. He then leaves the city on its eastern side, and makes himself a shelter, waiting to see whether or not the city will be destroyed. God causes a plant, in Hebrew a kikayon, also called a gourd in the King James Version, (Note: The plant in Jonah 4:6ff is also called a castor-oil plant in the Jerusalem Bible, and a vine in the World English Bible. Its exact identity is said to be unknown in the New King James Version.) to grow over Jonah's shelter to give him some shade from the sun. Later, God causes a worm to bite the plant's root and it withers. Jonah, now being exposed to the full force of the sun, becomes faint and pleads for God to kill him. In response, God offers Jonah one final rebuke:

God said to Jonah, "Does your anger over the kikayon do any good?" And he said, "My anger does good, even to death!"
The LORD said, "You had pity over the kikayon, for which you had not labored, nor made grow, which was in a night, and was lost in a night;
and I should not have pity over the great city of Nineveh, within which are more than twelve myriads of man, whom do not know between their right and their left, and much livestock?"

— Book of Jonah, chapter 4, verses 9–11

The book ends abruptly at this point.

== Interpretive history ==
=== Early Jewish interpretation ===
Fragments of the book were found among the Dead Sea Scrolls, most of which follow the Masoretic Text closely and with Mur XII reproducing a large portion of the text. As for the non-canonical writings, the majority of references to biblical texts were made as appeals to authority. The Book of Jonah appears to have served less purpose in the Qumran community than other texts, as the writings make no references to it.

=== Late Jewish interpretation ===
The 18th century Lithuanian master scholar and kabbalist, Elijah of Vilna, known as the Vilna Gaon, authored a commentary on the biblical Book of Jonah as an allegory of reincarnation.

=== Early Christian interpretation ===
==== New Testament ====
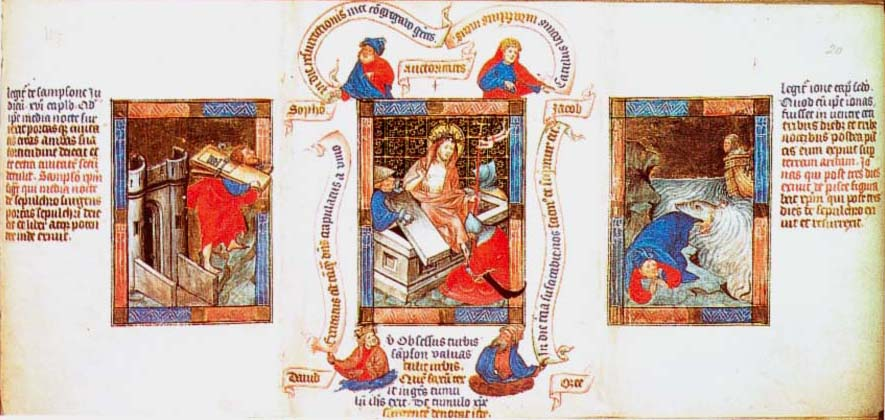
Christ rises from the tomb, alongside Jonah spit onto the beach, a typological allegory. From a 15th-century Biblia pauperum.

The earliest Christian interpretations of Jonah are found in the Gospel of Matthew and the Gospel of Luke. Both Matthew and Luke record a tradition of Jesus' interpretation of the Book of Jonah (notably, Matthew includes two very similar traditions in chapters 12 and 16).

As with most Old Testament interpretations found in the New Testament, the interpretation ascribed to Jesus is primarily typological. Jonah becomes a "type" for Jesus. Jonah spent three days in the belly of the fish; Jesus will spend three days in the tomb. Here, Jesus plays on the imagery of Sheol found in Jonah's prayer. While Jonah metaphorically declared, "Out of the belly of Sheol I cried," Jesus will literally be in the belly of Sheol. Finally, Jesus compares his generation to the people of Nineveh. Jesus fulfills his role as a type of Jonah, however his generation fails to fulfill its role as a type of Nineveh. Nineveh repented, but Jesus' generation, which has seen and heard one even greater than Jonah, fails to repent. Through his typological interpretation of the Book of Jonah, Jesus has weighed his generation and found it wanting.

==== Augustine of Hippo ====
The debate over the credibility of the miracle of Jonah is not simply a modern one. The credibility of a human being surviving in the belly of a great fish has long been questioned. In c. 409 AD, Augustine of Hippo wrote to Deogratias concerning the challenge of some to the miracle recorded in the Book of Jonah. He writes:

The last question proposed is concerning Jonah, and it is put as if it were not from Porphyry, but as being a standing subject of ridicule among the Pagans; for his words are: "In the next place, what are we to believe concerning Jonah, who is said to have been three days in a whale's belly? The thing is utterly improbable and incredible, that a man swallowed with his clothes on should have existed in the inside of a fish. If, however, the story is figurative, be pleased to explain it. Again, what is meant by the story that a gourd sprang up above the head of Jonah after he was vomited by the fish? What was the cause of this gourd's growth?" Questions such as these I have seen discussed by Pagans amidst loud laughter, and with great scorn.

— (Letter CII, Section 30)

Augustine responds that if one is to question one miracle, then one should question all miracles as well (section 31). Nevertheless, despite his apologetic, Augustine views the story of Jonah as a figure for Christ. For example, he writes: "As, therefore, Jonah passed from the ship to the belly of the whale, so Christ passed from the cross to the sepulchre, or into the abyss of death. And as Jonah suffered this for the sake of those who were endangered by the storm, so Christ suffered for the sake of those who are tossed on the waves of this world." Augustine credits his allegorical interpretation to the interpretation of Christ himself (Matthew 12:39–40), and he allows for other interpretations as long as they are in line with Christ's.

=== Medieval commentary tradition ===
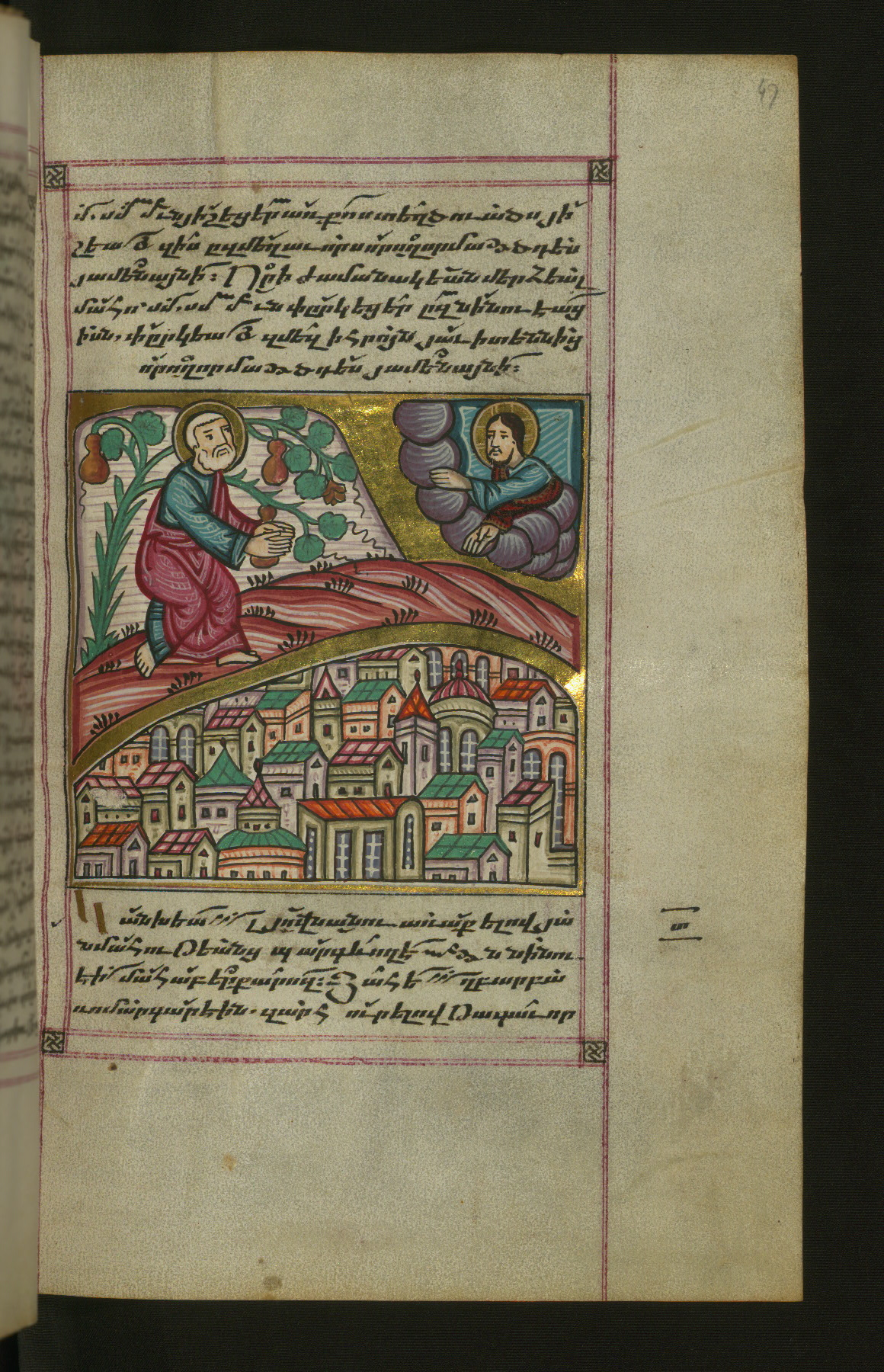
"Jonah outside the city of Nineveh" (1678), from an Armenian hymnal

The Ordinary Gloss, or Glossa Ordinaria, was the most important Christian commentary on the Bible in the later Middle Ages. Ryan McDermott comments that "The Gloss on Jonah relies almost exclusively on Jerome's commentary on Jonah (c. 396), so its Latin often has a tone of urbane classicism. But the Gloss also chops up, compresses, and rearranges Jerome with a carnivalesque glee and scholastic directness that renders the Latin authentically medieval." "The Ordinary Gloss on Jonah" has been translated into English and printed in a format that emulates the first printing of the Gloss.

The relationship between Jonah and his fellow Jews is ambivalent, and complicated by the Gloss's tendency to read Jonah as an allegorical prefiguration of Jesus Christ. While some glosses in isolation seem crudely supersessionist ("The foreskin believes while the circumcision remains unfaithful"), the prevailing allegorical tendency is to attribute Jonah's recalcitrance to his abiding love for his own people and his insistence that God's promises to Israel not be overridden by a lenient policy toward the Ninevites. For the glossator, Jonah's pro-Israel motivations correspond to Christ's demurral in the Garden of Gethsemane ("My Father, if it be possible, let this chalice pass from me") and the Gospel of Matthew's and Paul's insistence that "salvation is from the Jews" (John 4:22). While in the Gloss the plot of Jonah prefigures how God will extend salvation to the nations, it also makes abundantly clear—as some medieval commentaries on the Gospel of John do not—that Jonah and Jesus are Jews, and that they make decisions of salvation-historical consequence as Jews.

=== Modern ===
In Jungian analysis, the belly of the whale can be seen as a symbolic death and rebirth, which is also an important stage in comparative mythologist Joseph Campbell's "hero's journey".

NCSY Director of Education David Bashevkin sees Jonah as a thoughtful prophet who comes to religion out of a search for theological truth and is constantly disappointed by those who come to religion to provide mere comfort in the face of adversity inherent to the human condition. "If religion is only a blanket to provide warmth from the cold, harsh realities of life," Bashevkin imagines Jonah asking, "did concerns of theological truth and creed even matter?" The lesson taught by the episode of the tree at the end of the book is that comfort is a deep human need that religion provides, but that this need not obscure the role of God.

John A. Miles Jr. reads the book as a parody of prophetic literature itself. On his account, Jonah keeps the recognizable furniture of a prophetic book, a call, an oracle of doom, and a response, while inverting each element for comic effect: the prophet flees his call rather than obeying it, the pagan sailors and the people of Nineveh repent at once, and the prophet sulks. The irony begins with the opening verse, since Jonah son of Amittai is literally “son of my truth,” from emet, “truth,” yet proves the least reliable of prophets.

== Jonah and the "big fish" ==
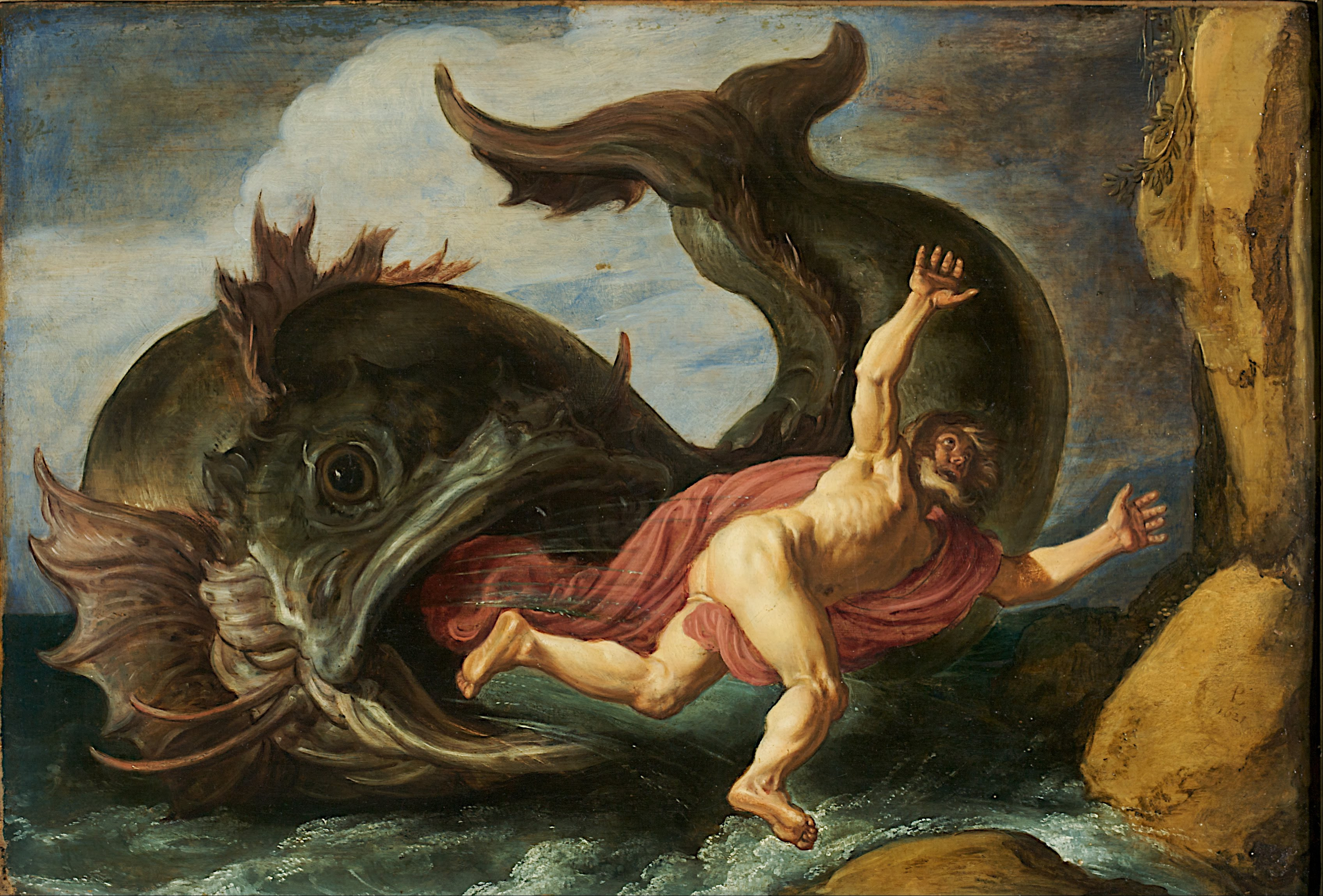
Jonah and the Whale (1621) by Pieter Lastman

The Hebrew text of Jonah reads dag gadol (Hebrew: דג גדול, dāḡ gāḏōl), literally meaning "great fish". The Septuagint translated this into Greek as kētos megas (κῆτος μέγας), "huge whale/sea monster"; and in Greek mythology the term was closely associated with sea monsters. Saint Jerome later translated the Greek phrase as piscis grandis in his Latin Vulgate, and as cētus in Matthew. At some point, cētus became synonymous with whale (cf. cetyl alcohol, which is alcohol derived from whales). In his 1534 translation, William Tyndale translated the phrase in Jonah 2:1 as "greate fyshe", and he translated the word kētos (Greek) or cētus (Latin) in Matthew as "whale". Tyndale's translation was later followed by the translators of the King James Version of 1611 and has enjoyed general acceptance in English translations.

In the book of Jonah chapter 1 verse 17, the Hebrew bible refers to the fish as dag gadol, "great fish", in the masculine. However, in chapter 2 verse 1, the word which refers to fish is written as dagah, meaning female fish. The verses therefore read: "And the lord provided a great fish (dag gadol, דָּג גּדוֹל, masculine) for Jonah, and it swallowed him, and Jonah sat in the belly of the fish (still male) for three days and nights; then, from the belly of the (dagah, דָּגָה, female) fish, Jonah began to pray."

== Jonah and the gourd vine ==
The Book of Jonah closes abruptly, with an epistolary warning based on the emblematic trope of a fast-growing vine present in Persian narratives, and popularized in fables such as The Gourd and the Palm-tree during the Renaissance, for example by Andrea Alciato.

St. Jerome differed from St. Augustine in his Latin translation of the plant known in Hebrew as קיקיון (qīqayōn), using hedera (from the Greek, meaning "ivy") over the more common Latin cucurbita, "gourd", from which the English word gourd (Old French coorde, couhourde) is derived. The Renaissance humanist artist Albrecht Dürer memorialized Jerome's decision to use an analogical type of Christ's "I am the Vine, you are the branches" in his woodcut Saint Jerome in His Study.

== Surviving ancient manuscripts ==
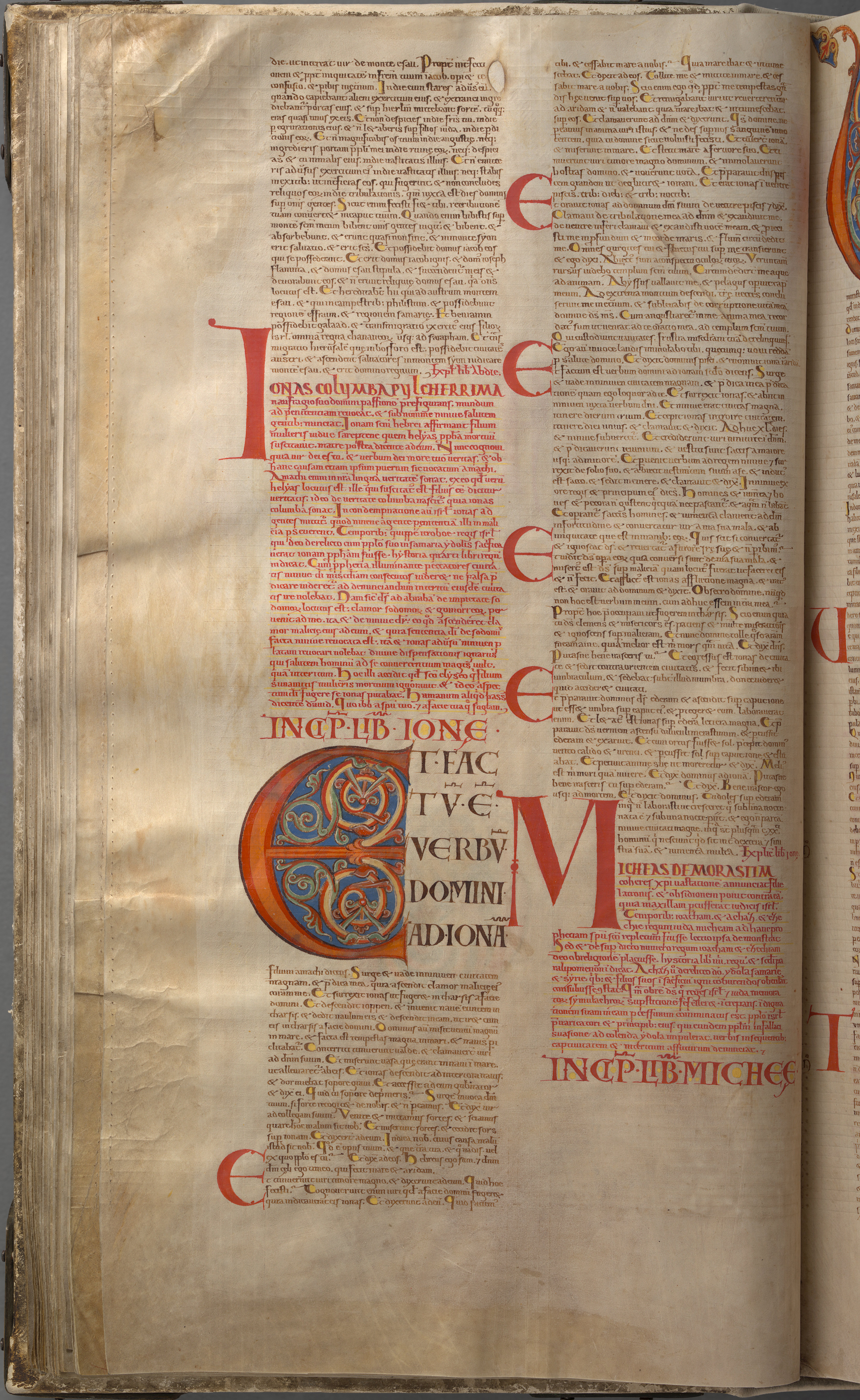
The whole Book of Jonah in Latin as a part of Codex Gigas, made around 13th century

Some early manuscripts containing the text of this book in Hebrew are of the Masoretic Text tradition, which includes the Codex Cairensis (895), the Petersburg Codex of the Prophets (916), and Codex Leningradensis (1008). (Note: Since 1947, the whole book is missing from Aleppo Codex.)

Fragments of this book in Hebrew were found among the Dead Sea Scrolls (cumulatively covering the whole book), including 4Q82 (4QXII^{g}; 25 BCE) with extant verses 1:1‑9, 2:3‑11, 3:1, 3:3, and 4:5‑11; and Wadi Murabba'at Minor Prophets (Mur88; MurXIIProph; 75–100 CE) with extant verses 1:14‑16, 2:1‑7; 3:2‑5, 3:7‑10; 4:1‑2, and 4:5.

The oldest known complete version of the book is the Crosby-Schøyen Codex, part of the Bodmer Papyri, which dates to the 3rd century, and is written in Coptic.

There is also a translation into Koine Greek known as the Septuagint, made in the last few centuries BC. Extant ancient manuscripts of the Septuagint version include Codex Vaticanus (B; $\mathfrak{G}$^{B}; 4th century), Codex Sinaiticus (S; BHK: $\mathfrak{G}$^{S}; 4th century), Codex Alexandrinus (A; $\mathfrak{G}$^{A}; 5th century) and Codex Marchalianus (Q; $\mathfrak{G}$^{Q}; 6th century).

Fragments containing parts of this book in Greek were found among the Dead Sea Scrolls, including 4Q76 (4QXII^{a}; 150–125 BCE) with extant verses 1:1–5, 1:7–10, 1:15–17 (1:17 = 2:1 in Hebrew Bible), 2:6 (verses 2:1,7 in Masoretic Text), and 3:2; 4Q81 (4QXII^{f}; 175–50 BCE) with extant verses 1:6–8, 1:10–16; 4Q82 (4QXII^{g}; 25 BCE) with extant verses 1:1–9, 2:2–10 (verses 2:3–11 in Masoretic Text), 3:1–3, and 4:5–11; and Wadi Murabba'at Minor Prophets (Mur88; MurXIIProph; 75–100 CE) with extant verses 1:1–17 (1:1–16, 2:1 in Hebrew Bible), 2:1–10 (verses 2:1–11 in Masoretic Text), 3:1–10, and 4:1–11., and Naḥal Ḥever (8ḤevXII^{gr}; 1st century CE) with extant verses 2:1–6 (verses 2:1–7 in Masoretic Text), 3:2–5, 3:7–10, 4:1–2, and 4:5.

== See also ==
- Jonah the son of Amittai
- Jaffa
- Nineveh
- Tarshish

== Notes ==
Book of Jonah Minor prophets
Preceded by Obadiah	Hebrew Bible	Succeeded by Micah
Preceded by Obadiah	Christian; Old Testament	Succeeded by Micah
