= Junuzović =

Junuzović (Serbo-Croatian pronunciation: [junǔːzoʋitɕ]; Serbian Cyrillic: Јунузовић) is a Bosnian surname, a patronymic derived from Arabic masculine given name Yunus. Notable people with the surname include:

- Edin Junuzović (born 1986), Bosnian footballer
- Zlatko Junuzović (born 1987), Austrian footballer
