= Mashhad, Israel =

Mashhad: מַשְׁהַד; مشهد
- Local council (from 1960)

Hebrew transcription(s)
  - ISO 259: Mašhad
  - Also spelled: Meshhed (official); Mashhed (unofficial)
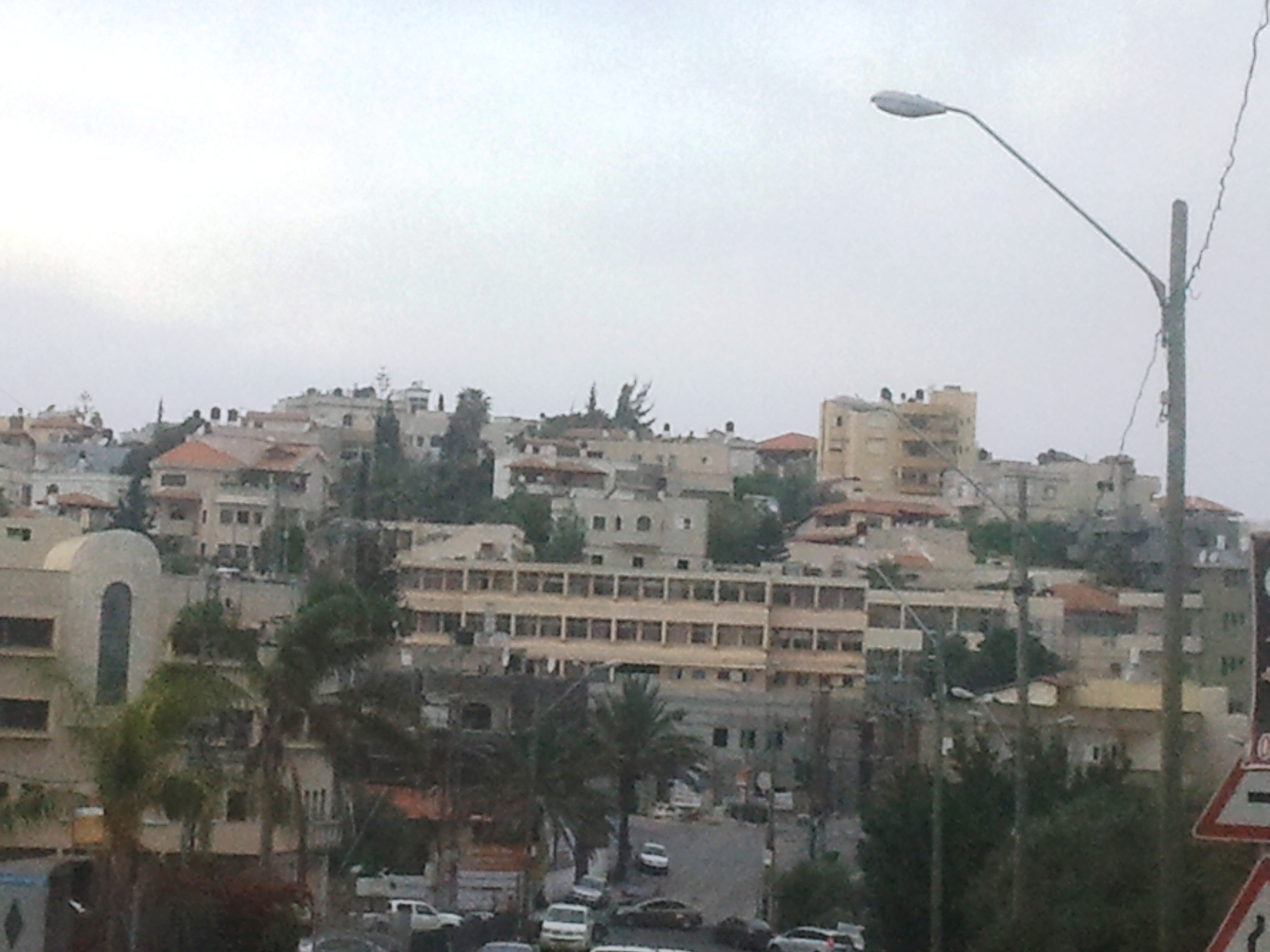
- Mashhad, 2014

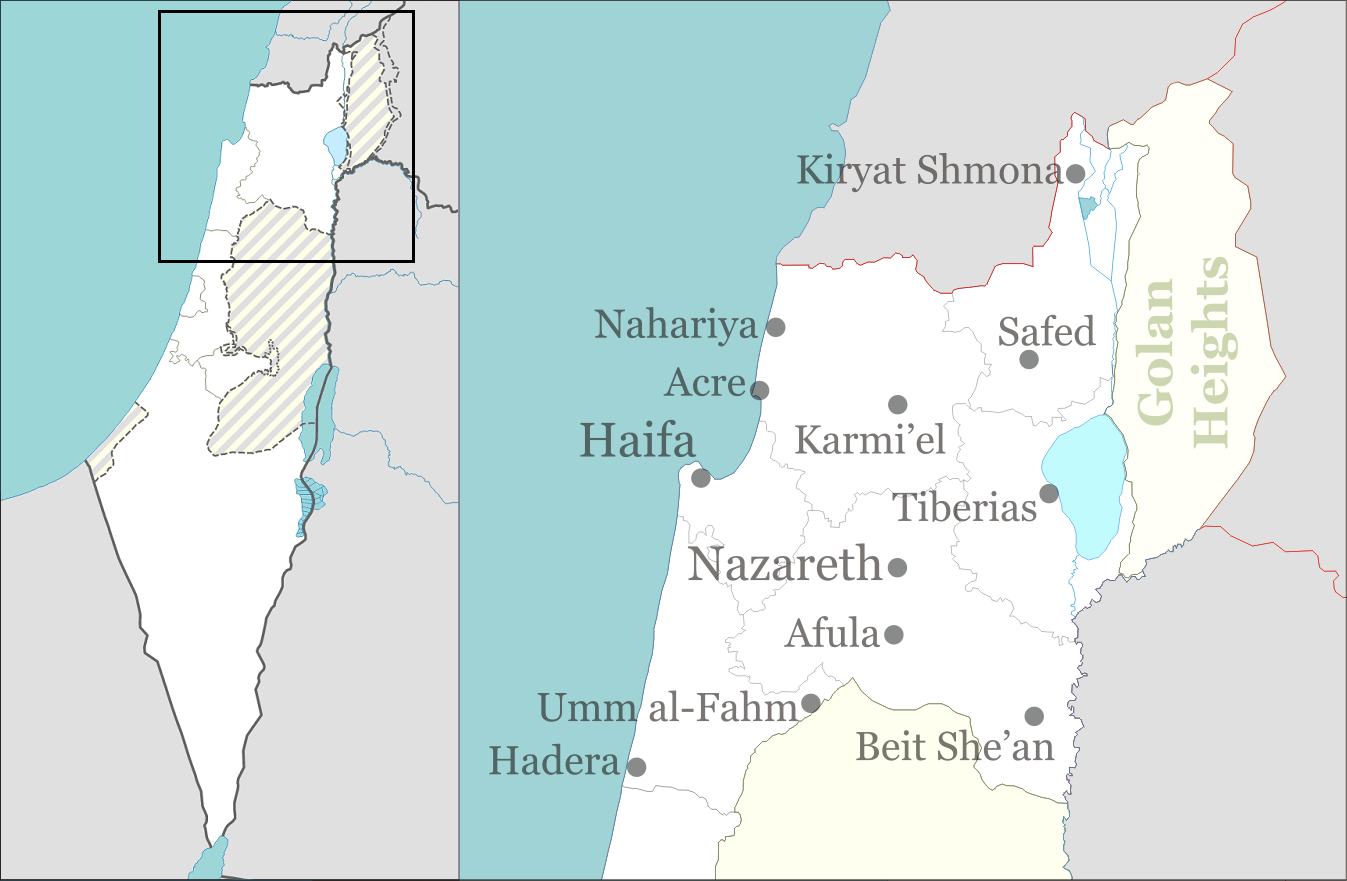
- Location within Northern Haifa region of Israel Location within Israel
- Coordinates: 32°44′16″N 35°19′32″E
- Grid position: 180/238 PAL
- Country: Israel
- District: Northern
- Subdistrict: Jezreel
- Natural Region: Nazareth-Tir'an Mountains

Area
  - Total: 7,286 dunams (7.286 km^{2}; 2.813 sq mi)

Population (2024)
  - Total: 8,822
  - Density: 1,211/km^{2} (3,136/sq mi)
- Name meaning: "The shrine or place of martyrdom"

Mashhad (Hebrew: מַשְׁהַד, Arabic: مشهد, romanized: Mash-hed 'martyrium', also known as Es-Mesched in another latinized transliteration) is an Arab town located 5 kilometers (3.1 mi) northeast of Nazareth in Israel's Northern District. In 2024 it had a population of 8,822, most of whom were Muslims.

== History ==
Remains from the Early Bronze Age, Persian, Roman and Byzantine eras have been found.

Mashhad is located on the site of Gath-hepher, an ancient Israelite town mentioned in the Hebrew Bible as the home of Jonah; his supposed tomb is still pointed out by locals.

Archaeological findings in Mashad include a third-century Aramaic gravestone, indicating Jewish settlement at the site during the Late Roman period, and a stone inscribed with Greek letters now reused in Mashad's mosque.

=== Ottoman Empire ===
In 1517, the village was incorporated into the Ottoman Empire with the rest of Palestine, and in 1596 it appeared in the Ottoman tax registers under the name of Mashad Yunis, as being in the nahiya (subdistrict) of Tabariyya, part of Safad Sanjak. It had a population of 31 households and 6 bachelors, all Muslim. They paid a fixed tax rate of 20% on agricultural products, which included wheat and barley, fruit trees, vegetable and fruit garden, orchard, as well as on goats and/or beehives; a total of 865 Akçe. All of the revenue went to a waqf.

A map from Napoleon's invasion of 1799 by Pierre Jacotin showed the place, named as El Mecheb.

In 1838 it was noted as a Muslim village in the Nazareth district.

In 1875, the French explorer Victor Guérin visited the village, which he estimated had at most 300 inhabitants. In 1881, the PEF's Survey of Western Palestine (SWP) described Meshed as "A small village, built of stone, surrounding the traditional tomb of Jonah -a low building surmounted by two white-washed domes. It contains about 300 Moslems, and is situated on the top of a hill, without gardens. The water supply is from cisterns."

A population list from about 1887 showed that el Meshed had about 450 inhabitants; all Muslims.

=== British Mandate ===
In the 1922 census of Palestine, conducted by the British Mandate authorities, Mashad had a total population of 356, all Muslim, which had increased in the 1931 census to 487; 486 Muslims and 1 Christian, in a total of 111 houses.

In the 1945 statistics the population was 660, all Muslims, with 11,067 dunams of land, according to an official land and population survey. Of this, 378 dunams were for plantations and irrigable land, 4,663 for cereals, while 24 dunams were built-up land.

=== Israel ===
Mashhad became a local council in 1960.

== Demographics ==
Historical population
Year	Pop.	±%
1972	2,200	—
1983	3,400	+54.5%
1995	5,200	+52.9%
2008	6,900	+32.7%
2022	8,499	+23.2%
2024	8,822	+3.8%

In 2022, 100% of the population was Muslim

== Voting Patterns ==
In the 2022 election, 96 percent of voters in Mashhad voted for the Arab parties, while 2 percent voted for the parties of the center-left coalition led by Yair Lapid and 1 percent voted for the parties of the right-wing coalition led by Benjamin Netanyahu. Among the voters for the Arab parties, 44 percent voted for Ra'am, while 30 percent voted for Balad and 27 percent voted for the Hadash–Ta'al list.

In the 2026 election, 97 percent of voters in Mashhad voted for the Arab parties, while 1 percent voted for the parties of the center-left coalition led by Gadi Eisenkot and 0.7 percent voted for the parties of the right-wing coalition led by Benjamin Netanyahu. Among the voters for the Arab parties, 50.4 percent voted for Ra'am, while 49.6 percent voted for the Joint List. Voter turnout increased 82 percent from the 2022 election.

== See also ==
- Arab localities in Israel

== Bibliography ==
- Alexandre, Yardenna (2008-01-13). "Tel Gat Hefer Final Report" (120). Hadashot Arkheologiyot – Excavations and Surveys in Israel.
- Barron, J.B., ed. (1923). Palestine: Report and General Abstracts of the Census of 1922. Government of Palestine.
- Conder, C.R.; Kitchener, H.H. (1881). The Survey of Western Palestine: Memoirs of the Topography, Orography, Hydrography, and Archaeology. Vol. 1. London: Committee of the Palestine Exploration Fund.
- Department of Statistics (1945). Village Statistics, April, 1945. Government of Palestine.
- Feig, Nurit (2016-12-19). "Tel Gat Hefer Final Report" (128). Hadashot Arkheologiyot – Excavations and Surveys in Israel.
- Guérin, V. (1880). Description Géographique Historique et Archéologique de la Palestine (in French). Vol. 3: Galilee, pt. 1. Paris: L'Imprimerie Nationale.
- Hadawi, S. (1970). Village Statistics of 1945: A Classification of Land and Area ownership in Palestine. Palestine Liberation Organization Research Center.
- Hütteroth, W.-D.; Abdulfattah, K. (1977). Historical Geography of Palestine, Transjordan and Southern Syria in the Late 16th Century. Erlanger Geographische Arbeiten, Sonderband 5. Erlangen, Germany: Vorstand der Fränkischen Geographischen Gesellschaft. ISBN 3-920405-41-2.
- Jaffe, Gilad Bezal’el (2012-11-27). "Tel Gat Hefer Final Report" (124). Hadashot Arkheologiyot – Excavations and Surveys in Israel.
- Karmon, Y. (1960). "An Analysis of Jacotin's Map of Palestine" (PDF). Israel Exploration Journal. 10 (3, 4): 155–173, 244–253. Archived from the original (PDF) on 2019-12-22.
- Limburg, James (1993), Jonah: A Commentary, Louisville, Kentucky: Westminster Knox Publishers, ISBN 0-664-21296-4
- Mills, E., ed. (1932). Census of Palestine 1931. Population of Villages, Towns and Administrative Areas. Jerusalem: Government of Palestine.
- Palmer, E.H. (1881). The Survey of Western Palestine: Arabic and English Name Lists Collected During the Survey by Lieutenants Conder and Kitchener, R. E. Transliterated and Explained by E.H. Palmer. Committee of the Palestine Exploration Fund.
- Porat, Leea (2006-09-21). "Tel Gat Hefer Final Report" (118). Hadashot Arkheologiyot – Excavations and Surveys in Israel.
- Rhode, H. (1979). Administration and Population of the Sancak of Safed in the Sixteenth Century. Columbia University. Archived from the original on 2020-03-01.
- Robinson, E.; Smith, E. (1841). Biblical Researches in Palestine, Mount Sinai and Arabia Petraea: A Journal of Travels in the year 1838. Vol. 3. Boston: Crocker & Brewster.
- Schumacher, G. (1888). "Population list of the Liwa of Akka". Quarterly Statement - Palestine Exploration Fund. 20: 169–191.
