= Amittai =

Father of the prophet Jonah

Amittai (/əˈmɪt.aɪ/; Hebrew: אֲמִתַּי, ʾÁmītay, "true"; Latin: Amathi; Arabic: مَتّىٰ, romanized: Mattā) was the father of the Prophet Jonah. He was also a native of Gath-hepher.

== In the Bible ==
Amittai is only mentioned twice in the Bible, in 2 Kings 14:25 and Jonah 1:1. Nothing is known about him, other than that he was Jonah's father.

== In Islam ==
Amittai (Matta in Arabic) is also mentioned in Islam by Muhammad. When Muhammad was returning from preaching in Ta'if and decided to take shelter in the garden of two leaders, Addas, a lowly servant boy, was sent to offer grapes to Muhammad. When Addas came, Muhammad asked which land he came from. Addas replied he was from Nineveh. Upon receiving this answer, Muhammad exclaimed "The town of Jonah, son of Amittai!" Overjoyed, Muhammad then told Addas how Jonah and he (Muhammad) were prophetic brothers.
