= Kikayon =

Plant mentioned in the bible

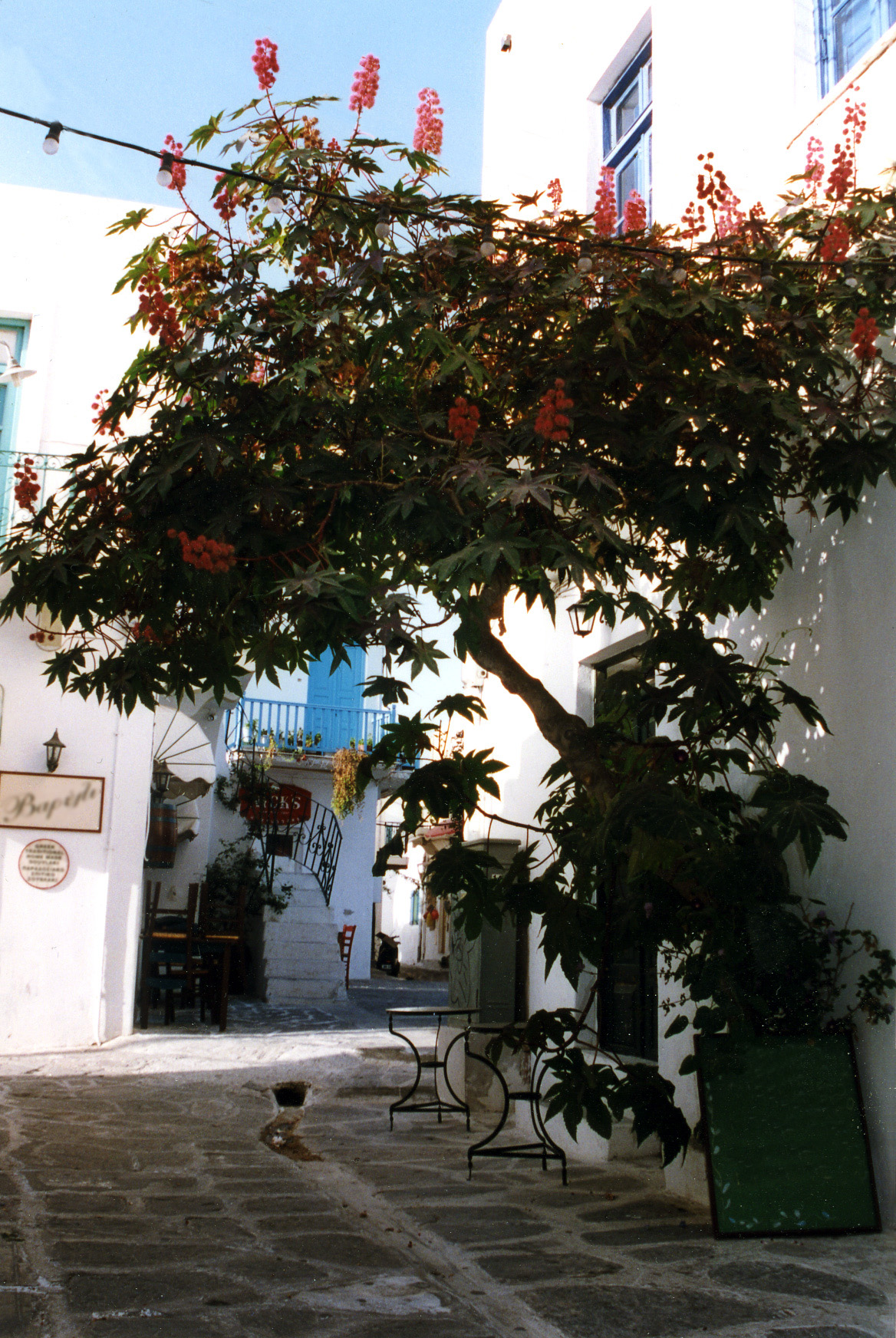
Castor oil plant

Kikayon (קִיקָיוֹן qîqāyōn) is the Hebrew name of a plant mentioned in the Biblical Book of Jonah.

== Origins ==
The first use of the term kikayon is in the biblical book of Jonah, Chapter 4. In the quote below, from the Jewish Publication Society translation of 1917, the English word 'gourd' occurs where the Hebrew has kikayon.

6 And the LORD God prepared a gourd, and made it to come up over Jonah, that it might be a shadow over his head, to deliver him from his evil. So Jonah was exceeding glad because of the gourd. 7 But God prepared a worm when the morning rose the next day, and it smote the gourd, that it withered. 8 And it came to pass, when the sun arose, that God prepared a vehement east wind; and the sun beat upon the head of Jonah, that he fainted, and requested for himself that he might die, and said: 'It is better for me to die than to live.' 9 And God said to Jonah: 'Art thou greatly angry for the gourd?' And he said: 'I am greatly angry, even unto death.' 10 And the LORD said: 'Thou hast had pity on the gourd, for which thou hast not laboured, neither madest it grow, which came up in a night, and perished in a night; 11 and should not I have pity on Nineveh, that great city, wherein are more than sixscore thousand persons that cannot discern between their right hand and their left hand, and also much cattle?'

--Jonah 4:6–11

== Classification ==
The word kikayon is only referenced in the book of Jonah and there is some question as to what kind of plant it is. Some hypotheses include a gourd and a castor oil plant (Ricinus communis). The current Hebrew usage of the word refers to the castor oil plant.

A well-known argument between Jerome and Augustine concerned whether to translate kikayon as "gourd" or "ivy", although Jerome indicates that in fact the plant is neither:

I have already given a sufficient answer to this in my commentary on Jonah. At present, I deem it enough to say that in that passage, where the Septuagint has gourd, and Aquila and the others have rendered the word ivy (κίσσος), the Hebrew manuscript has ciceion, which is in the Syriac tongue, as now spoken, ciceia. It is a kind of shrub having large leaves like a vine, and when planted it quickly springs up to the size of a small tree, standing upright by its own stem, without requiring any support of canes or poles, as both gourds and ivy do. If, therefore, in translating word for word, I had put the word ciceia, no one would know what it meant; if I had used the word gourd, I would have said what is not found in the Hebrew. I therefore put down ivy, that I might not differ from all other translators.
