= Kisai Marvazi =

Persian poet (10th century CE)

Kisāʾī Marvazī
- كسائی مروزی
- Born: Abu’l-Ḥasan Majd-al-Dīn ʿAli ibn Muhammad (or in some sources: Abu Isḥāq Majd-al-Dīn ʿAli ibn Muhammad); 6 March 953 CE; Merv (Khorasan)
- Died: c. 1000-1001 CE
- Occupation: Poet
- Writing career
- Pen name: Kisāʾī (also vocalized Kasāʾi)
- Language: Persian
- Years active: Late 10th century
- Period: 10th-11th century
- Genres: Didactic poetry; moral-religious poetic themes; panegyrics
- Subjects: Religion, ethics, praise of rulers, reflection on age
- Notable works: Dīvān (collection of poems), poems on moral / religious themes

Kisa'i Marvazi (Persian: کسایی مروزی; March 6, 953 – c. 1001 CE) was a 10th-century Persian poet known for his religious and moralistic poetry. He was among the earliest Persian poets to incorporate Islamic themes into Persian poetry, distinguishing him from his contemporaries.

== Biography ==
His full name was probably Abu’l-Hasan (or Abu Ishaq) Majd al-Din ʿAli ibn Muhammad Kisāʾi (or Kasāʾi) Marvazi, as mentioned by Ali al-Bakharzi in Dumyat al-Qasr. He was born on March 6, 953 CE, in Merv, a significant cultural and intellectual center of the Islamic world at the time. His birth date is explicitly mentioned in one of his poems:

- "The year reached three hundred forty-one,

On a Wednesday, three days before the end of Shawwal."*

Initially, Kisa'i Marvazi composed poetry in praise of the Samanid rulers, particularly Nuh II ibn Mansur, and later shifted his allegiance to the Abbasids and Ghaznavids, notably Mahmud of Ghazni. His poetry reflects the changing political landscapes of his time, often blending religious themes with courtly praise.

== Poetry and literary contributions ==
Kisa'i Marvazi's poetry was well-regarded in his time, and his Diwan (poetic collection) was preserved at least until the 12th century. However, much of his work has been lost over time, with only fragments and individual poems surviving through later compilations by lexicographers and scholars.

His poetry primarily focuses on:

- Religious and ethical themes, making him one of the first Persian poets to introduce Islamic moral teachings into Persian literature.
- Praise for rulers, particularly the Samanids and Ghaznavids.
- Philosophical and mystical reflections on life, faith, and destiny.

== Conversion and religious views ==
Some sources suggest that Kisa'i Marvazi later converted to Shia Islam, though definitive historical evidence for this claim is scarce. His religious poetry, however, often reflects a deep engagement with Islamic beliefs and moral values.

== Influence and legacy ==
Kisa'i Marvazi played a crucial role in shaping Persian literary traditions by integrating Islamic spirituality into Persian poetry. His influence extended to later poets who sought to blend Persian literary aesthetics with religious and philosophical themes. Though much of his work has been lost, he remains an important figure in Persian literary history.

== See also ==
- List of Persian poets and authors
- Persian literature

== Bibliography ==
- Jan Rypka, History of Iranian Literature. Reidel Publishing Company. 1968. ISBN 90-277-0143-1
- Mohammad-Amin Riahi, Kisai Marvazi, his life and poetry, Tehran, 1988.
