= Gath-hepher =

Border town in ancient Israel

Coordinates: 32°44′30″N 35°19′30″E

Gath-hepher (Israel)

Gath-hepher or Gat Hefer (Hebrew: גַּת הַחֵפֶר, romanized: Gaṯ haḤēp̄er) was a border town in the Northern Kingdom of Israel around the 8th century BCE. According to the Deuteronomistic history, it was the home of the prophet Jonah.

== History ==
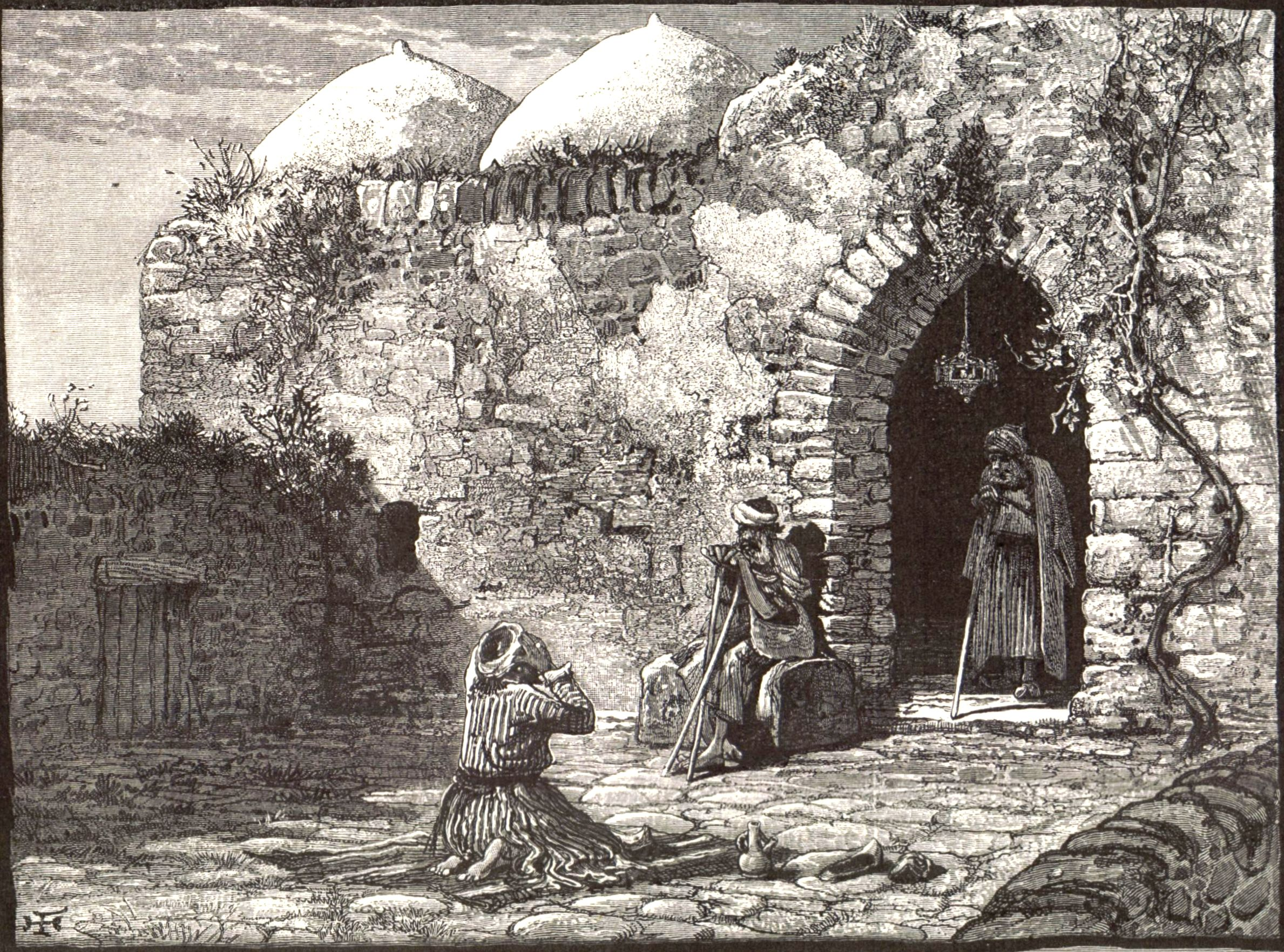
Jonah's tomb

Gath means winepress in Hebrew. The town is mentioned twice in the Hebrew Bible, in Joshua 19:13 and 2 Kings 14:25. In Joshua, a copying error has resulted in the form Gittah-hepher.

Jerome in Roman Empire describes the town as "an inconsiderable village" and tells that the tomb of Jonah was nearby. Similarly, the medieval geographer Benjamin of Tudela also relates the tomb of Jonah in his travels to the area.

Today the site, at latitude 32° 44' 30" N and longitude 35° 19' 30" E in the Galilee, is a small set of ruins on a hilltop near the Arab village of Mashhad five kilometres north of Nazareth and one kilometre from Kafr Kanna. The supposed tomb of Jonah is still pointed out by locals.
