= List of Kurdish castles =

A Kurdish castle is a castle which was built by Kurds or built under a Kurdish state (this includes castles in which the builders were most likely Kurds)

Official name Native Name	Location	Picture	State/Tribe	Builder	Construction date	Notes
Hoşap Castle Kela Xoşebê	Van Province, Turkey		Mahmudi	Sarı Süleyman Bey	1649	The castle was built upon the foundations of a medieval Armenian fortress, itself preceded by an Urartian stronghold.
Harran Castle	Şanlıurfa Province, Turkey		Ayyubid (reconstruction)	Al-Adil I (reconstruction)	c. 1200 (reconstruction)	Most of the present structure dates to the Ayyubid Sultanate (c. 1200) but the castle is substantially older. Its exact founding date is unknown but it appears to have been built at some point during the time Harran was under Byzantine rule (4th–7th centuries) and was originally a palace.
Al-Rahba	Deir-ez Zor, Syria		Ayyubid	Shirukh (original castle) Shirukh II (reconstruction)	12th/13th century (original) 1207 (reconstruction)	The original site, which was known as "Rahbat Malik ibn Tawk" was destroyed in an earthquake in 1157. A few years later, the current fortress was built by the Ayyubid lord Shirkuh (Uncle of Saladin). HIs descendants held al-Rahba as a hereditary fief granted by Saladin until 1264. One of them, Shirkuh II, oversaw a third major reconstruction in 1207.
Xanzad Castle	Erbil, Kurdistan Region		Soran	Mir Xanzad	16th century	The castle was built by Mir Xanzad the ruler of the Soran Emirate. She ordered it built to serve her as place of residence and as defense of Erbil, her capital.
Srochik Castle	Barzinjah, Kurdistan Region		Unknown	Unknown	Unknown	The castle was used as a prison by the Baban dynasty.
Sherwana Castle	Kalar, Kurdistan Region		Jaff	Mohamed Pasha Jaff	1866	The British destroyed many Palaces and Fortresses built by Kurds during the Mahmud Barzanji revolts. Sherwana Castle was the exception, since the Brits had good relations with the Jaff.
Dimdim Castle	West Azerbaijan Province, Iran		Bradost (reconstruction)	Emîr Xan Lepzêrîn (reconstruction)	1609 (reconstruction)	According to Kurdish oral tradition the fortress was built in the pre-Islamic era. It was the location of the Battle of Dimdim.
Aghli Beg Castle	Baneh County, Iran		Unknown	Unknown	Unknown	
Barvish Kani Castle	Baneh County, Iran		Unknown	Unknown	Unknown	
Qujileh Castle	Baneh County, Iran		Unknown	Unknown	Unknown	
Shargeh Castle	Baneh County, Iran		Unknown	Unknown	Unknown	
Surin Castle	Baneh County, Iran		Unknown	Unknown	Unknown	
Akh Kand Bala Castle	Bijar County, Iran		Unknown	Unknown	Middle Ages	
Akh Kand Pain Castle	Bijar County, Iran		Unknown	Unknown	Middle Ages	
Khan Baghi Castle	Bijar County, Iran		Unknown	Unknown	Middle Ages	
Qala Qureh Castle	Bijar County, Iran		Unknown	Unknown	Unknown	
Ardalan Castle	Tuyserkan County, Iran		Ardalan	Unknown	Sometime between the 14th century and 1868	
Sarmaj Castle	Kermanshah Province, Iran		Hasanwayhids	One of the Hasanwayhid Emirs	Before 651, modern structure from the Middle Ages	Originally build under the Sasanians, modern structure by the Hasanwayhids.
Bajul Castle	Aligudarz County, Iran		Zand	Unknown	18th century	
Karim Khan Citadel	Shiraz, Iran		Zand	Karim Khan Zand	1766-1767	It was built as part of a complex during the Zand dynasty. It is named after Karim Khan, and served as his living quarters. In the past, the citadel was sometimes used as a prison. Today, it is a museum operated by Iran's Cultural Heritage Organization.
Hoseynabad Castle	Taft County, Iran		Zand	Unknown	18th century	
Doran Castle	Kerman County, Iran		Zand	Unknown	18th century	

== See also ==
- List of castles
- Castles in Turkey
- Castles in Syria
- Castles in Iraq
- Castles in Iran
