= Islamic State occupation of Mosul =

- Part of the War in Iraq (2013–2017)
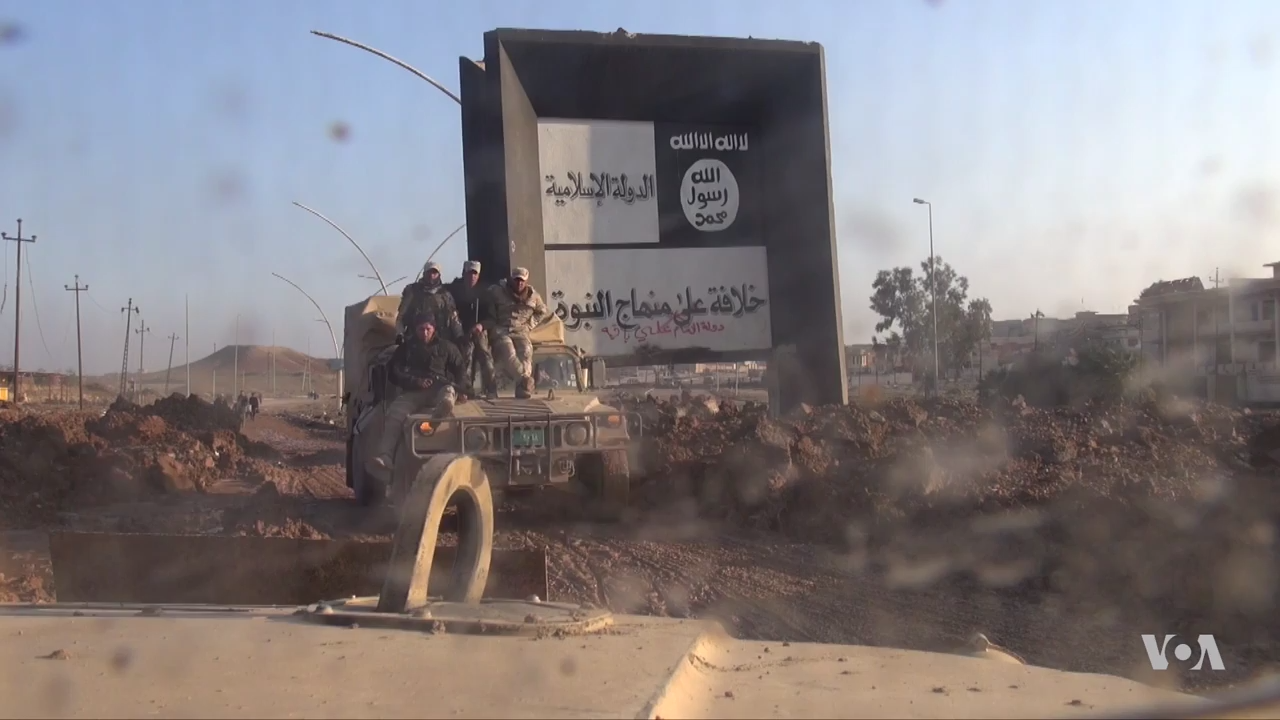
- Iraqi soldiers write "the State of Imam Ali remains" (challenging the Islamic State's motto: "the Islamic State remains") on an Islamic State sign in eastern Mosul, January 2017.
- Date: 10 June 2014 – 21 July 2017 (3 years, 1 month, 1 week and 4 days)
- Location: Mosul, Iraq
- Type: Military occupation
- Cause: Fall of Mosul
- Perpetrator: Islamic State
- Outcome: Mosul recaptured by Iraqi forces
- Deaths: 7,000+ by mass executions

The occupation of Mosul by the Islamic State began after the fall of Mosul when Islamic State fighters took control of the city on 10 June 2014, and became the de facto government in the area. Mosul was a strategically important city for the Islamic State and was a target by anti-Islamic State forces. Over the course of battles in 2015 and 2016–2017, the Iraqi Armed Forces, aided by Peshmerga and CJTF–OIR forces, fully recaptured Mosul by 21 July 2017.

The Islamic State carried out a brutal occupation in Mosul, resulting in the death, torture, rape, and disappearance of many of the city's citizens. Women were subjected to a strict variant of Sharia law while members of religious and ethnic minorities were killed or evicted from the city. Widespread looting and destruction of cultural, religious, and historical artifacts occurred. Armed resistance against the occupation took place in and around the city, mainly undertaken by Kurdish, Turkmen, Assyrian, and Shia groups.

== Background ==
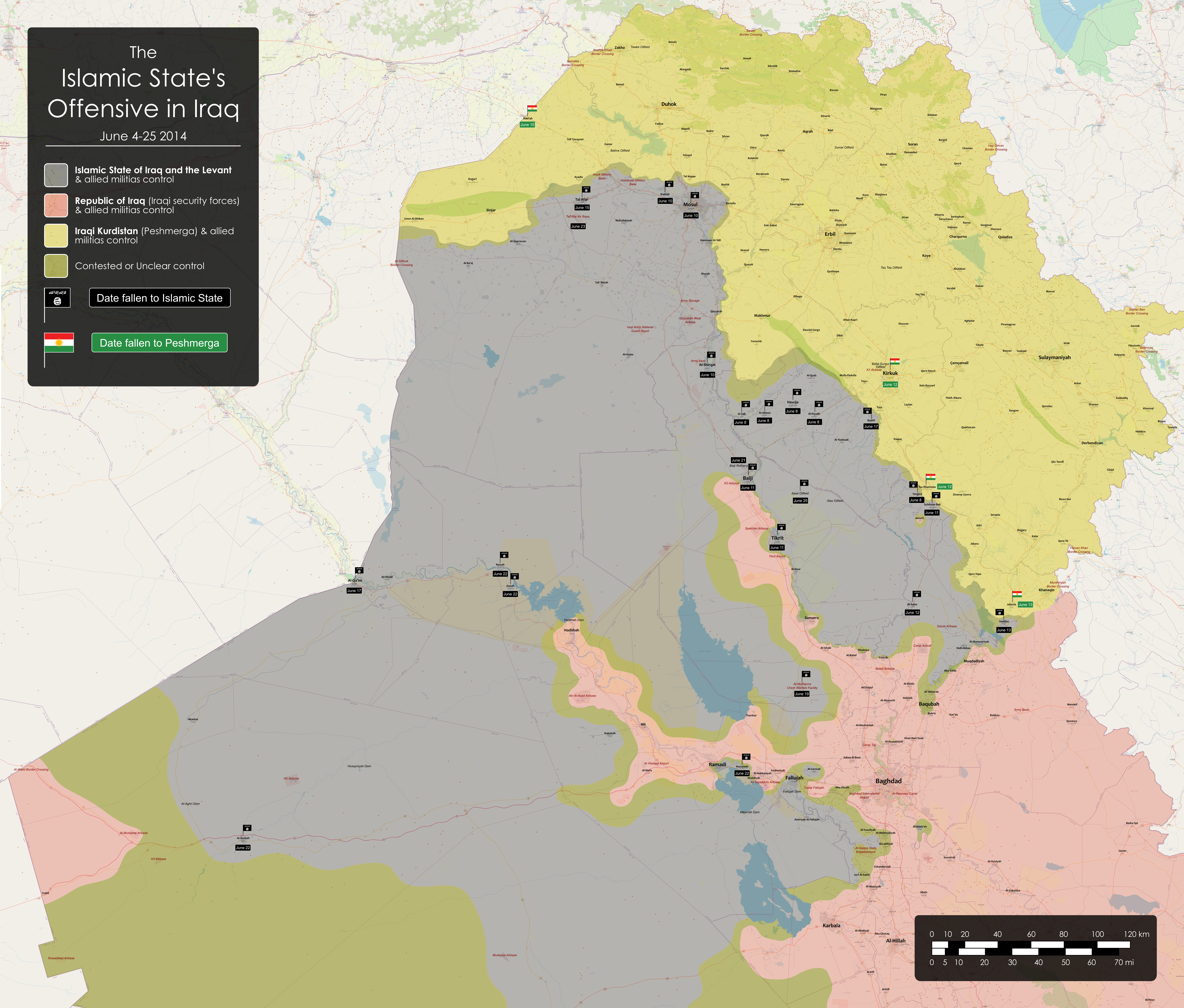
Map of the Islamic State's gains during its invasion of Iraq

In June 2014, the Islamic State quickly took control of Mosul after the Iraqi troops stationed there had fled. Troop shortages and infighting among top officers and Iraqi political leaders had benefitted the Islamic State and caused a panic that led to Mosul's abandonment. Kurdish intelligence had been warned by a reliable source in early 2014 that ISIL would eventually attack Mosul, and former members of the Iraqi Ba'ath Party had informed the USA and the UK, but Prime Minister of Iraq, Nouri al-Maliki, and the Defence Minister turned down repeated offers of help from the Peshmerga. When the Iraqi Army fled, and were massacred, the Islamic State acquired three divisions' worth of up-to-date American arms and munitions—including M1129 Stryker 120-mm mortars and at least 700 armoured Humvee vehicles.

== Population ==
Following the fall of Mosul, an estimated half a million people escaped on foot or by car during the next two days. Many residents had trusted the Islamic State fighters at first in the city, and according to a member of the UK's Defence Select Committee, Mosul "fell because the [predominantly Sunni] people living there were fed up with the sectarianism of the Shia-dominated Iraqi government."

According to western and pro-Iraqi government press, Mosul residents were de facto prisoners, forbidden to leave the city unless they left the Islamic State a significant collateral of family members, personal wealth, and property. They could then leave after paying a significant "departure tax" to be able to leave the city for three days, and for a higher fee they could surrender their home permanently, pay the fee, and leave for good. If those with a three-day pass failed to return within that time, their assets would be seized and their family killed.

=== Human rights abuses ===
Scores of people in Mosul were tortured and executed without a fair trial. Civilians in Mosul were not permitted to leave Islamic State-controlled areas and civilians were executed when they tried to flee Mosul. The killing of civilians, enemy soldiers, and members of the Islamic State who were accused of offenses was a regular occurrence and peaked during the Mosul offensive.

=== Treatment of women ===
Women were forcibly taken by Islamic State men to become their brides. Women were required to be accompanied by a male guardian and women had to be fully covered up in black, head to toe, in observance of a strict variant of Sharia law. Failure to follow the regulations was punished by fines or male relatives being given 40 or more lashes. Men were also required to fully grow their beards and hair in line with Islamic State edicts.

The Canadian-based NGO the RINJ Foundation, which operated medical clinics in Mosul, claimed that rape cases in the city proved a pattern of genocide, and hoped it would lead to a conviction of genocide against the Islamic State in the International Criminal Court.

In August 2015, it was reported that captured women and girls were being sold to sex slave traders. Most female Yazidis from Mosul and the greater Mosul region (Nineveh) were imprisoned and occasionally killed for resistance to being sold as sex slaves. Iraqi Turkmen women and girls would also suffer a fate similar to Yazidi women.

== Persecution of religious and ethnic minorities ==
Mosul was one of the areas which the Iraqi Turkmen genocide took place in. Mosul was also once home to at least 70,000 Assyrian Christians, there were possibly none left in Mosul after ISIL took over; any who remained were forced to pay a tax for remaining Christian and lived under a constant threat of violence. The indigenous Assyrians of ancient Mesopotamian ancestry, whose history in the region dates back over 5,000 years, saw their churches and monasteries vandalized and burned down, their ancient Assyrian heritage sites dating to the Iron Age destroyed, and their homes and possessions seized by the Islamic State. They also faced ultimatums to either convert to Islam, leave their ancient homelands, or be murdered. Attacks against the Christian community in Mosul were not new however, a series of bloody attacks against Christians living in Mosul occurred in 2008 and reduced the religious population in the city.

The Islamic State also issued an edict expelling (in effect ethnically cleansing) the remaining predominantly ethnic Assyrian and Armenian Christian Mosul citizens after they refused to attend a meeting to discuss their future status. According to Duraid Hikmat, an expert on minority relationships and a resident of Mosul, the Christians were afraid to attend. Emboldened Islamic State authorities systematically destroyed and vandalized Abrahamic cultural artifacts, such as the cross from St. Ephrem's Cathedral, the tomb of Jonah, and a statue of the Virgin Mary. Islamic State militants destroyed and pillaged the Tomb of Seth. Artifacts from the tomb were removed to an unknown location.

Students from Muslim Shia and Sufi minorities were also abducted.

According to a UN report, ISIL forces persecuted ethnic groups in and near Mosul. The Assyrians, Kurds, Armenians, Yazidis, Turkmen, Mandeans, Kawliya, and Shabaks were victims of unprovoked, religiously motivated murders, assaults, theft, kidnappings, and the destruction of their cultural sites.

- Mosque of the Prophet Yunus or Yunas (Jonah): On one of the two most prominent mounds of Nineveh ruins, used to rise the Mosque (an Assyrian Church year) of Prophet Yunas "Biblical Jonah". Jonah (Yonan), the son of Amittai, from the 8th century BC, is believed to be buried here, where King Esarhaddon of Assyria once built a palace. It was one of Mosul's most important mosques, and one of the few historic mosques on the east side of the city. On 24 July 2014, the building was destroyed by explosives set by ISIL forces. In March 2017, after ISIS was driven out, a system of tunnels were found under the mosque. Although all moveable items had been removed there were still Assyrian reliefs, structures and carvings along the walls.
- Mosque of the Prophet Jerjis: The mosque is believed to be the burial place of Prophet Jerjis (Saint George in Christianity). Built of marble with shen reliefs and last renovated in 1393, it was mentioned by the explorer Ibn Jubair in the 12th century and is believed to include the tomb of Al-Hur bin Yousif.
- Mashad Yahya Abul Kassem: Built in the 13th century, it was on the right bank of the Tigris and known for its conical dome, decorative brickwork and calligraphy engraved in Mosul blue marble.
- Mosul library: Including the Sunni Muslim library, the library of the 265-year-old Latin Church and Monastery of the Dominican Fathers and the Mosul Museum Library. Among the 112,709 books and manuscripts thought lost are a collection of Iraqi newspapers dating from the early 20th century, as well as maps, books and collections from the Ottoman period; some were registered on a UNESCO rarities list. The library was ransacked and destroyed by explosives on 25 February 2015.
- Mosul Museum and Nergal Gate: Statues and artifacts that date from the Assyrian and Akkadian empires, including artefacts from sites including the Assyrian cities of Nineveh, Ashur, Arrapḫa, Dur-Sharrukin and Kalhu (Nimrud) and the Neo-Assyrian site of Hatra. Their plans for extraction were accelerated when ISIL scheduled the destruction of the al-Ḥadbā.
- Turkish consulate in Mosul: Turkish diplomats and consular staff were detained for over 100 days.

== Armed resistance ==
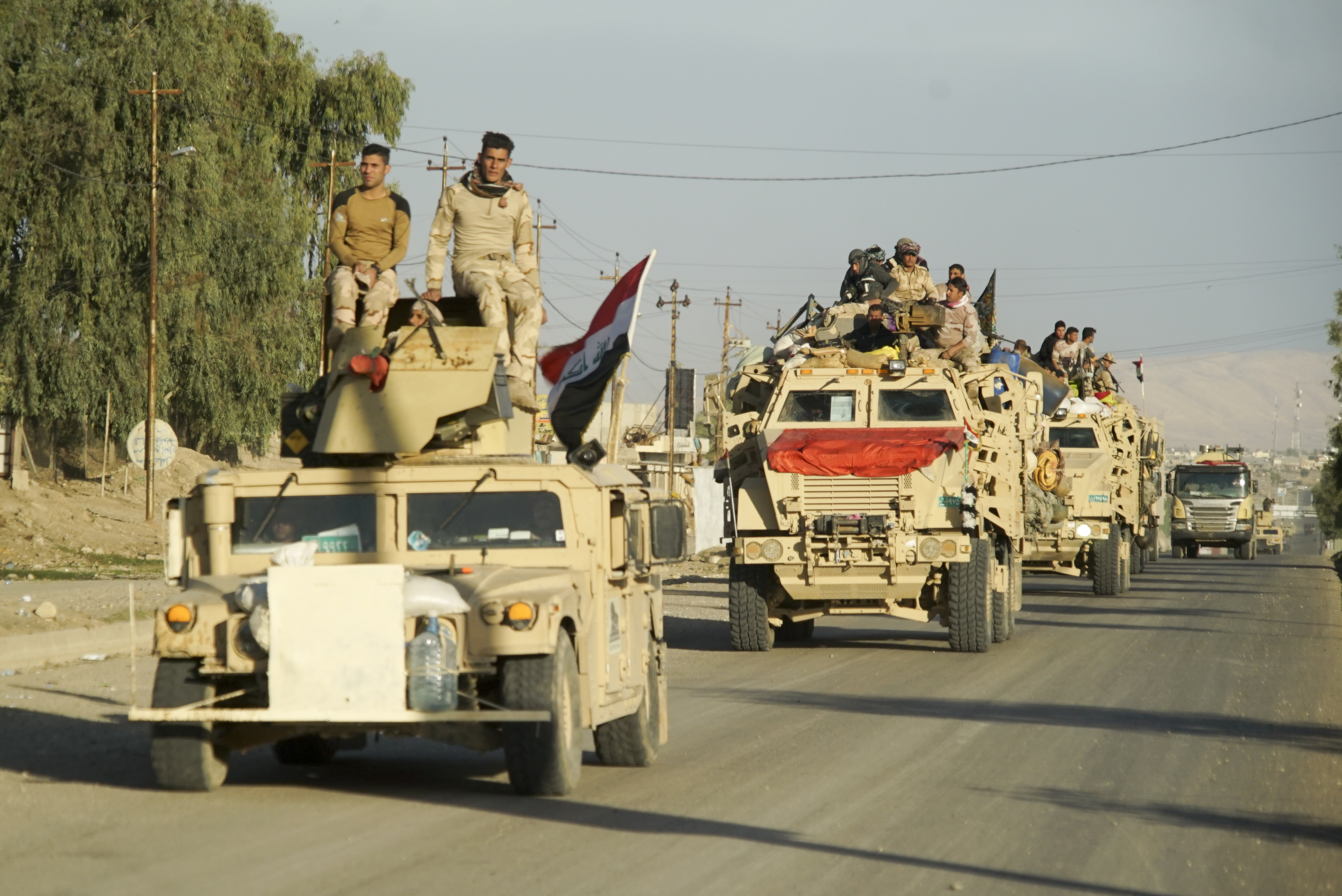
Iraqi army convoy in Mosul, 17 November 2016

The Prophet Yunus Brigade (Arabic: كتيبة النبي يونس), named after the Mosque of Prophet Yunus, also known as the Mosul Brigade, operated inside Mosul and conducted urban guerrilla warfare. The brigade claimed to have killed members of the Islamic State with sniper fire in 2014. In the countryside around Mosul, Peshmerga, Assyrian militias, and the Iraqi Turkmen Front had also taken up arms to resist oppression by the Islamic State, and successfully repelled attacks and prevented an invasion on their towns and villages. The Popular Mobilization Forces — an umbrella group that’s predominantly Shia Arabs but also includes Sunni Arab tribal fighters, Christian militias, Yazidi militias, and other non-military forces, played a big role in the war against the Islamic State. In one notable incident, groups inside the city reportedly killed five Islamic State militants and destroyed two of their vehicles.

== Liberation ==
On 9 July 2017, the Iraqi Prime Minister arrived in Mosul to announce the victory over ISIL, and an official declaration of victory was proclaimed on 10 July. However, heavy clashes continued in a final pocket of ISIL resistance in the Old City, for almost another two weeks. It was estimated that removing the explosives from Mosul and repairing the city over the next five years would require $50 billion (2017 USD), while Mosul's Old City alone would cost about US$1 billion to repair.

The Battle of Mosul was concurrent with the Battle of Sirte (2016) in Libya and the Raqqa campaign (2016–17) conducted by the Syrian Democratic Forces (SDF) against ISIL's capital city and stronghold in Syria. (Full article...)
