= Srochik Castle =

Ruined Castle in Barzinjah, Kurdistan Region, Iraq

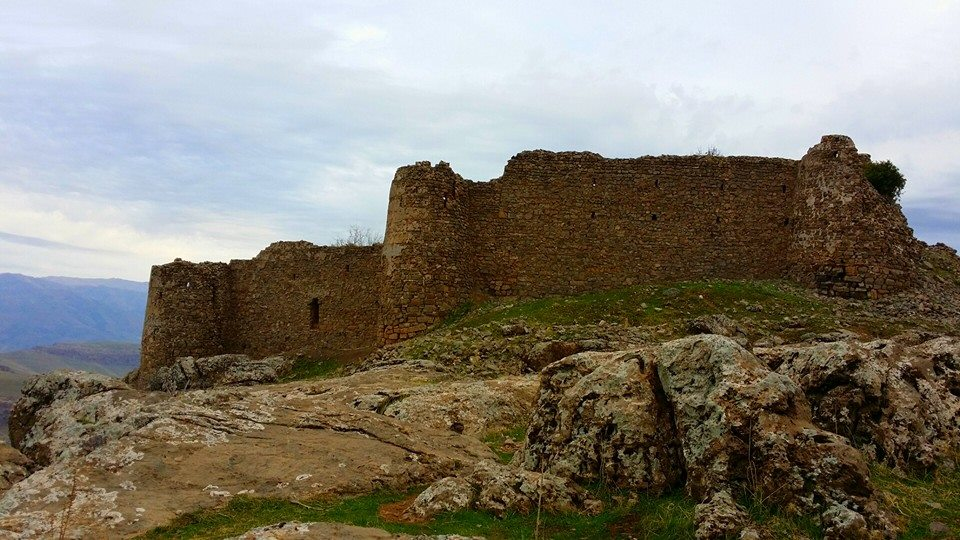
- Srochik Castle (Stone and Lime Castle)
- Interactive map of the Srochik Castle area

General information
- Architectural style: Medieval
- Location: Barzinjah, Kurdistan Region, Iraq
- Coordinates: 35.4765°N 45.7767°E
- Year built: Estimated to be around 1000 years old

Technical details
- Material: Stone and Lime

Srochik Castle (locally known as "Stone and Lime Castle") is a ruined castle located in Barzinjah, Kurdistan Region. It is situated on a hill. The castle was used as a prison by the Baban dynasty.

== Experts' Views on the Site ==
Shikar Aziz, a local archaeologist, states:

“Based on its impressive architecture, Srochik Castle may date back over a thousand years to the Sultan Muzafar era. Its vaults, rooms, halls, interior decorations, and walls resemble those found in castles built a millennium ago.”

Regarding the excavation of the site, Aziz adds:

“There are many international teams working in various locations, but Srochik urgently requires attention as it could collapse at any moment. If it does, restoration will become significantly more difficult and time-consuming. It's better to start now.”

Kamaran Hassan, a local historian, comments:

“Srochik is a rare castle, but we know very little about it. We must begin work on this unique site as soon as possible to uncover discoveries that could be beyond imagination.”

== See also ==
- List of Kurdish castles
- List of castles in Iraq
