= Surin Castle =

Castle in Kurdistan Province, Iran

Kuran castle
- قلعه سورین

General information
- Type: Castle
- Location: Baneh County, Iran

Kuran castle (Persian: قلعه سورین) is a historical castle located in Baneh County in Kurdistan Province.

== See also ==
- List of Kurdish castles
