= Akh Kand Pain Castle =

Castle in Kurdistan Province, Iran

Akh Kand Pain castle
- قلعه آخکند پائین

General information
- Type: Castle
- Location: Bijar County, Iran

Akh Kand Pain castle (Persian: قلعه آخکند پائین) is a historical castle located in Bijar County in Kurdistan Province, The longevity of this fortress dates back to the Historical periods after Islam.

== See also ==
- List of Kurdish castles
