= United Nations Security Council Resolution 2199 =

UN Security Council Resolution 2199
- Date: 12 February 2015
- Meeting no.: 7,379
- Code: S/RES/2199 (Document)
- Subject: Threats to international peace and security caused by terrorist acts
- Voting summary: 15 voted for; None voted against; None abstained
- Result: Adopted

Security Council composition
- Permanent members: China; France; Russia; United Kingdom; United States
- Non-permanent members: Angola; Chad; Chile; Jordan; Lithuania; Malaysia; New Zealand; Nigeria; Spain; Venezuela

United Nations Security Council Resolution 2199 was unanimously approved on 12 February 2015 to combat terrorism. Drafted by Russia, its legally binding provisions gave the fifteen nations of the United Nations Security Council authority to enforce decisions with economic sanctions. The resolution, in particular, emphasized "the need to combat by all means, in accordance with the Charter of the United Nations and international law, [...] threats to international peace and security caused by terrorist acts".

== Provisions ==
Resolution 2199 highlighted several financial measures to fight terrorism, such as asset freezing and closure of all financial sources of terrorism, including illegal drug trade and extraction of natural resources by terrorists. The resolution also noted that the provisions of Resolution 2161 unconditionally ban the payment of ransom to terrorist groups in exchange for hostages. The resolution also condemned the destruction of cultural heritage by ISIL and the Al-Nusrah Front.

Under Resolution 2199, UN member states must report within 120 days to the Al-Qaida Sanctions Committee on their compliance with the resolution. The resolution also asked the United Nations counter-terrorism bodies to supervise progress on the document's implementation.
