= Bajul Castle =

Castle in Lorestan Province, Iran

- قلعه باجول

General information
- Type: Castle
- Location: Aligudarz County, Lorestan Province, Iran

Bajul Castle (Persian: قلعه باجول) is a historical castle located in Aligudarz County in Lorestan Province, the longevity of this fortress dates back to the late Zand dynasty and early Qajar era.

== See also ==
- List of castles in Iran
- List of Kurdish castles
