= Akh Kand Bala Castle =

Castle in Kurdistan Province, Iran

Akh Kand Bala castle
- قلعه آخکند بالا

General information
- Type: Castle
- Location: Bijar County, Iran

Akh Kand Bala castle (Persian: قلعه آخکند بالا) is a historical castle located in Bijar County in Kurdistan Province, The longevity of this fortress dates back to the Middle Ages Historical periods after Islam.

== See also ==
- List of Kurdish castles
