= Shargeh Castle =

Castle in Kurdistan Province, Iran

Shargeh castle
- قلعه شرگه

General information
- Type: Castle
- Location: Baneh County, Iran

Shargeh castle (Persian: قلعه شرگه) is a historical castle located in Baneh County in Kurdistan Province.

== See also ==
- List of Kurdish castles
