= Qujileh Castle =

Castle in Kurdistan Province, Iran

Qujileh castle
- قلعه قوجیله

General information
- Type: Castle
- Location: Baneh County, Iran

Qujileh castle (Persian: قلعه قوجیله) is a historical castle located in Baneh County in Kurdistan Province.

== See also ==
- List of Kurdish castles
