= Mosque of Sayyid Ar-Mahmoud =

Mosque in Iraq, destroyed by ISIL in 2014

- مسجد السيد محمود
- The mosque, prior to its 2014 destruction

Religion
- Affiliation: Shia (Twelver) (former)
- Ecclesiastical or organisational status: Mosque and shrine (1998–2014)
- Status: Destroyed by ISIL

Location
- Location: Tal Afar, Nineveh Governorate
- Country: Iraq

Architecture
- Type: Mosque architecture
- Completed: 1998
- Destroyed: 2014

Specifications
- Dome: 1
- Minaret: 1
- Shrine: 1

The Mosque of Sayyid Ar-Mahmoud is a former Twelver Shi'ite mosque and shrine complex that was located in Tal Afar, in the Nineveh Governorate of Iraq. The complex was founded in 1998 and destroyed in 2014. The mausoleum of Sayyid Ar-Mahmoud was located under the green dome of the mosque.

== Destruction ==
The mausoleum was destroyed by the Islamic State of Iraq and the Levant in 2014 as part of a plan to destroy historic shrines in Tal Afar, Sinjar, Mosul and Nineveh. Explosives were planted at the tomb, completely destroying the green dome as well as the shrine under it and damaged several graves in the cemetery next to the shrine.

== See also ==
Zarih of Ar-Mahmoud within the mosque under the green dome.

- Destruction of cultural heritage by the Islamic State
- Islam in Iraq
- List of mosques in Iraq
