= Ardalan Castle =

Castle in Hamadan Province, Iran

Ardalan castle
- قلعه اردلان
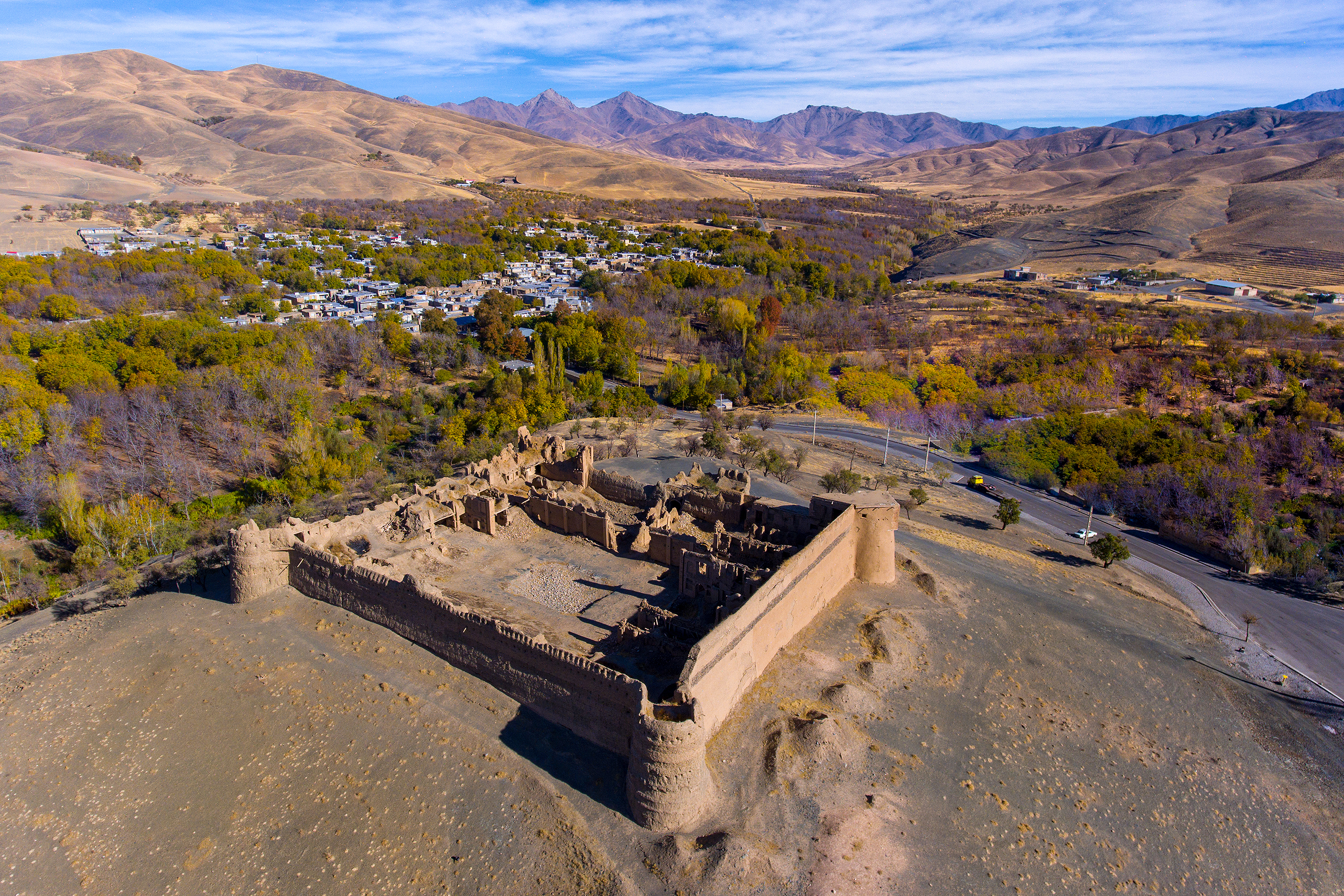
- Interactive map of the Ardalan castle area

General information
- Type: Castle
- Location: Tuyserkan County, Iran
- Coordinates: 34°38′00″N 48°17′37″E

Ardalan castle (Persian: قلعه اردلان) is a historical castle located in Tuyserkan County in Hamadan Province, The longevity of this fortress dates back to the Qajar dynasty.

== See also ==
- List of castles in Iran
- List of Kurdish castles
