= Hoseynabad Castle =

Castle in Yazd Province, Iran

Hoseynabad castle
- قلعه حسین‌آباد
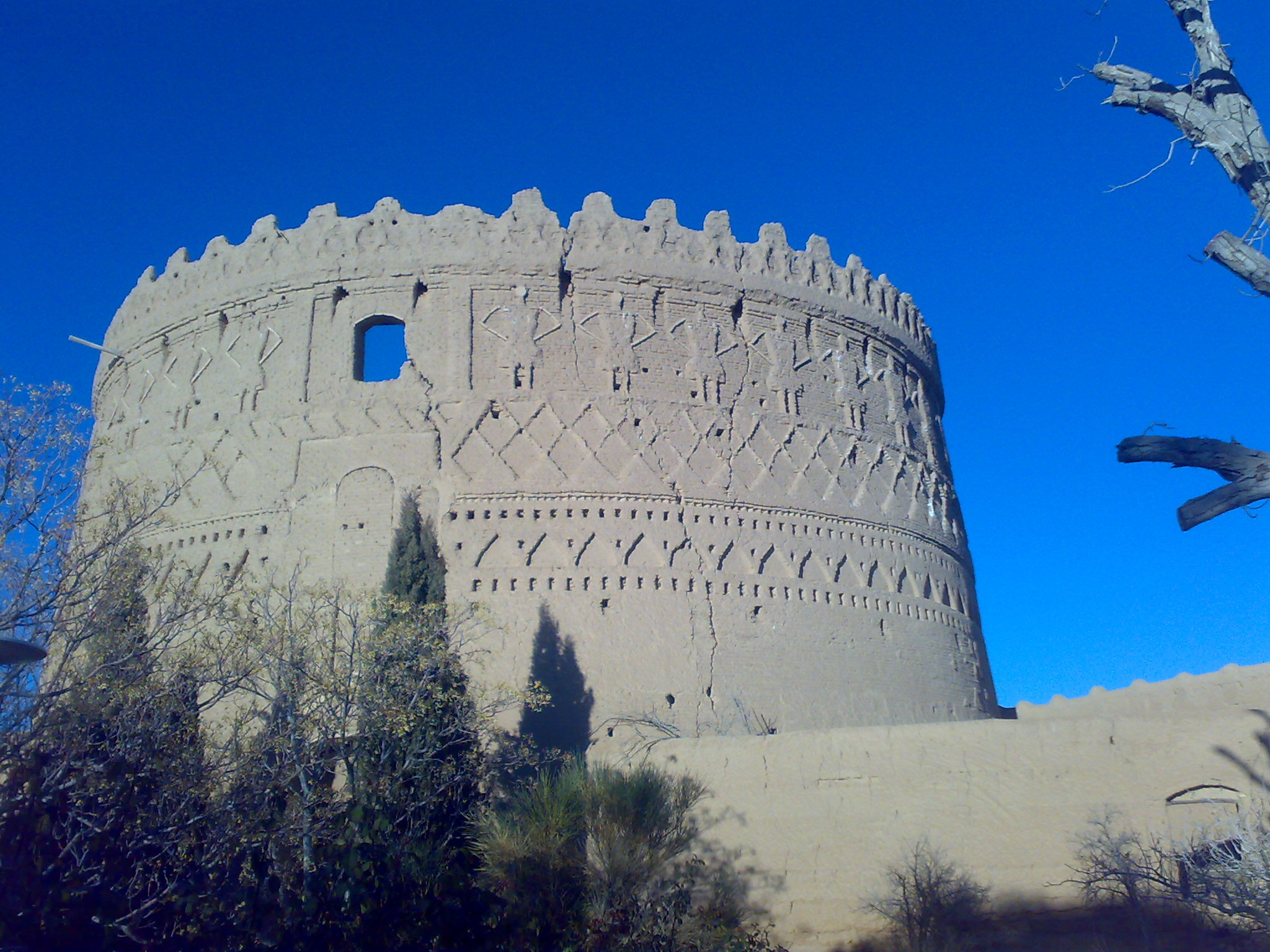

General information
- Type: Castle
- Location: Taft County, Iran

Hoseynabad castle (Persian: قلعه حسین‌آباد) is a historical castle located in Taft County in Yazd Province, The longevity of this fortress dates back to the Zand dynasty.

== See also ==
- List of Kurdish castles
