= Doran Castle =

Castle in Kerman Province, Iran

Doran castle
- قلعه دران
- Interactive map of the Doran castle area

General information
- Type: Castle
- Location: Kerman County, Iran

Doran castle (Persian: قلعه دران) is a historical castle located in Kerman County in Kerman Province, The longevity of this fortress dates back to the Afsharid dynasty and Zand dynasty.

== See also ==
- List of castles in Iran
- List of Kurdish castles
