= Destruction of cultural heritage by the Islamic State =

Part of the War against the Islamic State (2014–present)

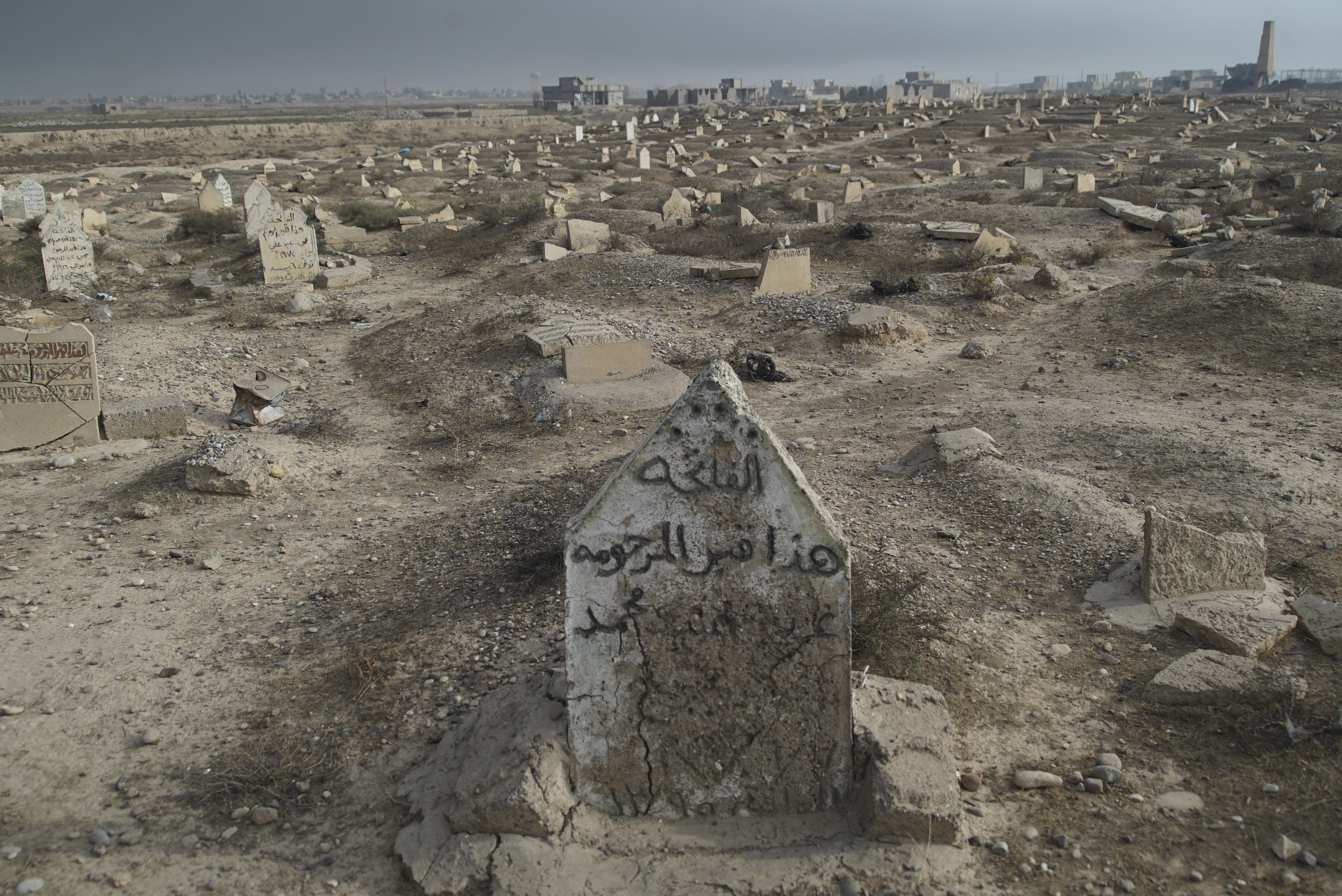
Cemetery in Qayyarah, Iraq, destroyed by the Islamic State (November 2016)

Since 2014, the Islamic State (IS) has destroyed cultural heritage on an unprecedented scale, primarily in Iraq and Syria, but also in Libya. These attacks and demolitions targeted a variety of ancient and medieval artifacts, museums, libraries, and places of worship, among other sites of importance to human history. Between June 2014 and February 2015, the Islamic State's Salafi jihadists plundered and destroyed at least 28 historic religious buildings in Mosul alone. Many of the valuables that were looted during these demolitions were used to bolster the economy of the IS.

Along with antique Mesopotamian sites of significance, the IS inflicted particularly cataclysmic levels of damage upon Iraqi Christian heritage. It also destroyed Islamic sites that it declared to be in contradiction of that which is permissible in its ideology.

== Motivation ==
IS justifies the destruction of cultural heritage sites by its Salafism, which, according to its followers, places "great importance on establishing tawhid [monotheism]" and "eliminating shirk [polytheism]". Thus there is an ideological underpinning to their destruction of historical and cultural heritage sites. IS views its actions in sites like Palmyra and Nimrud as being in accordance with Sunni Islamic tradition.

Beyond the ideological aspects of the destruction, there are other, more practical, reasons behind IS's destruction of historic sites. They gained international attention through the resulting extensive media coverage and international condemnation. Destroying historic ruins also allowed IS to remove traces of previous culture or civilization. IS has also been making use of the looted antiquities to finance its activities. Despite the UN's ban on the trade of artifacts looted from Syria since 2011, the group has been smuggling these artifacts out of the Middle East and on to the underground antique markets of Europe and North America.

== Destroyed heritage ==
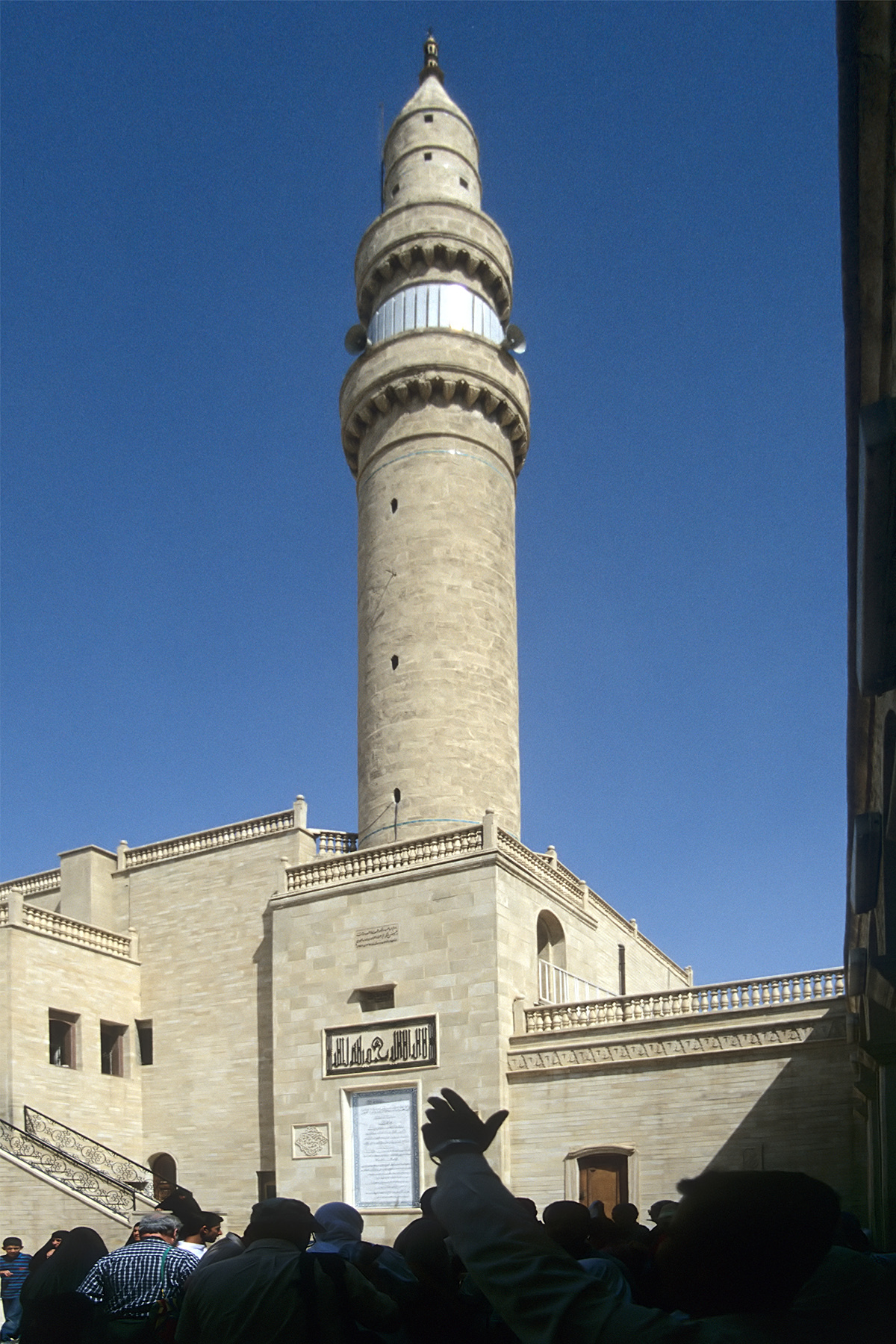
Prophet Jonah (Nabi Yunus) Mosque in Mosul, pictured in 1999. It was destroyed by IS in 2014.

=== Mosques and shrines ===
In 2014, media reported destruction of multiple religious buildings belonging to both Sunni and Shia sects throughout areas captured by IS. Among them were the tomb of Ibn al-Athir, Imam Abbas Mosque in Mosul, the Sheikh Jawad Al-Sadiq Mosque, Tomb of Sayyid Ar-Mamut Baba, Hamu al-Qadu Mosque, Martyrs' Mosque, Saad Ibn Aqeel Shrine in Tal Afar, the Sufi Ahmed al-Rifai Shrine and Sheikh Ibrahim's shrine in Mahlabiya District.

In Mosul, IS also targeted several tombs with shrines built over them. In July 2014, IS destroyed one of the tombs of prophet Daniel and the tomb and mosque of the prophet Jonah with explosives, as well as the tomb of Prophet Jirjis (George). The same month, IS also destroyed the 13th-century Mausoleum of Imam Awn Al-Din in Mosul, one of the few structures to have survived the 13th-century Mongol invasion. The destruction was mostly carried out with explosives, but in some cases bulldozers were used.

On 24 September 2014, the Al-Arba'een Mosque in Tikrit, containing forty tombs from the Umar era, was blown up. The building also contained two shrines, one dedicated to Sitt Nafisa and the other dedicated to Amr ibn Jundab al-Ghafari.

On 26 February 2015, IS blew up the 12th century Green Mosque in central Mosul.

In March 2015, IS bulldozed to the ground the Hamu Al-Qadu Mosque in Mosul, dating back to 1880. The Hamu-Al-Qadu mosque contained an earlier tomb of Ala-al-din Ibn Abdul Qadir Gilani. In the same year IS ordered the removal of all decorative elements and frescoes from mosques in Mosul, even those containing Quranic verses that mention Allah. They were described by IS as "an erroneous form of creativity, contradicting the basics of sharia". At least one imam in Mosul opposing that order was shot to death.

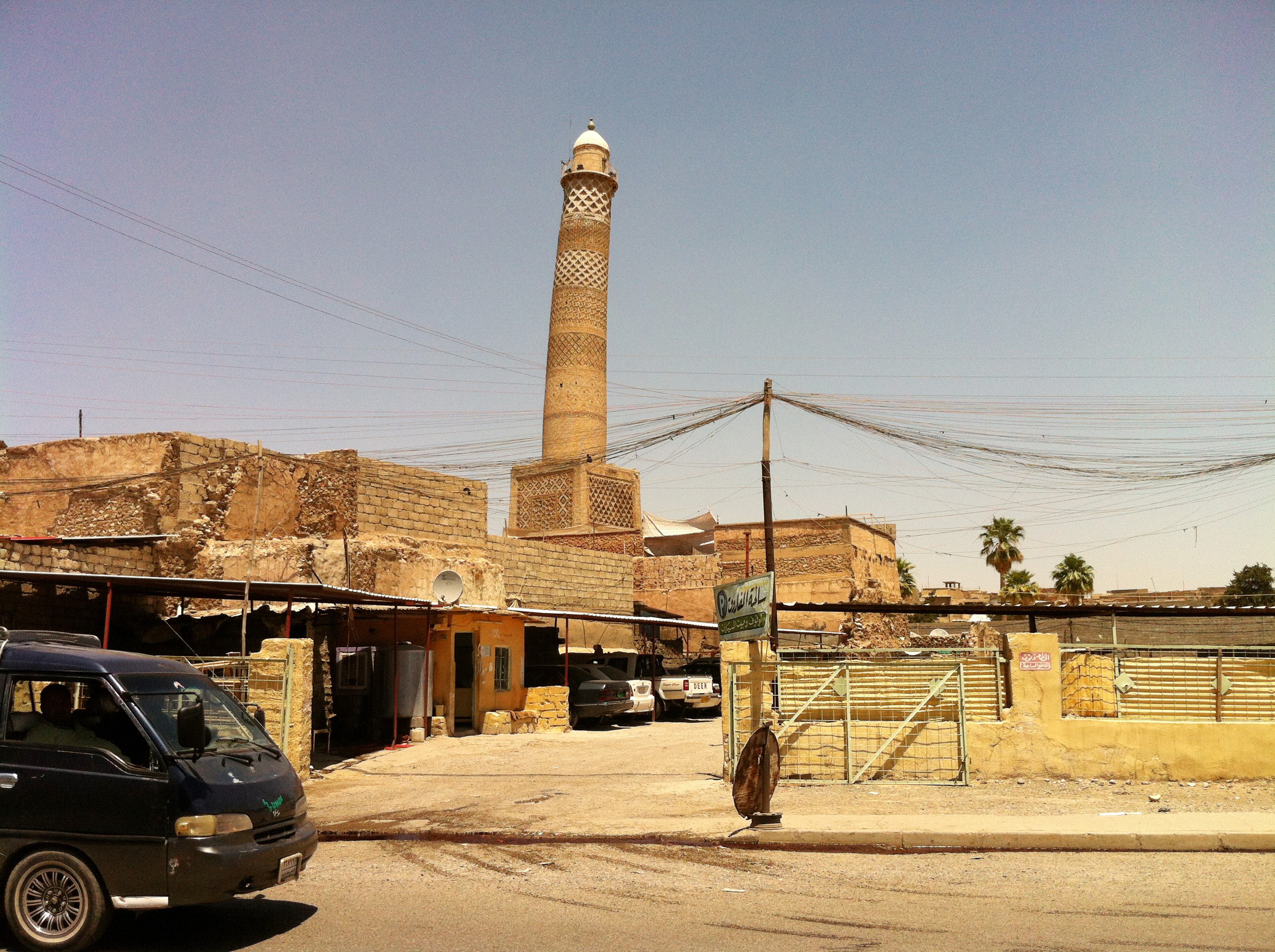
Leaning minaret of the Great Mosque of Al-Nuri in 2013. Destroyed by IS on 22 June 2017 during the Battle of Mosul.

In 2016, IS destroyed the Minaret of Anah in Al Anbar Province, which dates back to the Abbasid Caliphate. The minaret was only rebuilt in 2013 after its destruction by an unknown perpetrator during the Iraqi Civil War in 2006.

In 2017, IS destroyed the Great Mosque of al-Nuri and its leaning minaret. This was the mosque where IS leader Abu Bakr al-Baghdadi declared the establishment of the Islamic State caliphate three years prior. IS claimed that the mosque had been bombed by the joint forces opposing IS, but video analysis indicated the mosque was destroyed with charges placed by IS.

=== Churches and monasteries ===
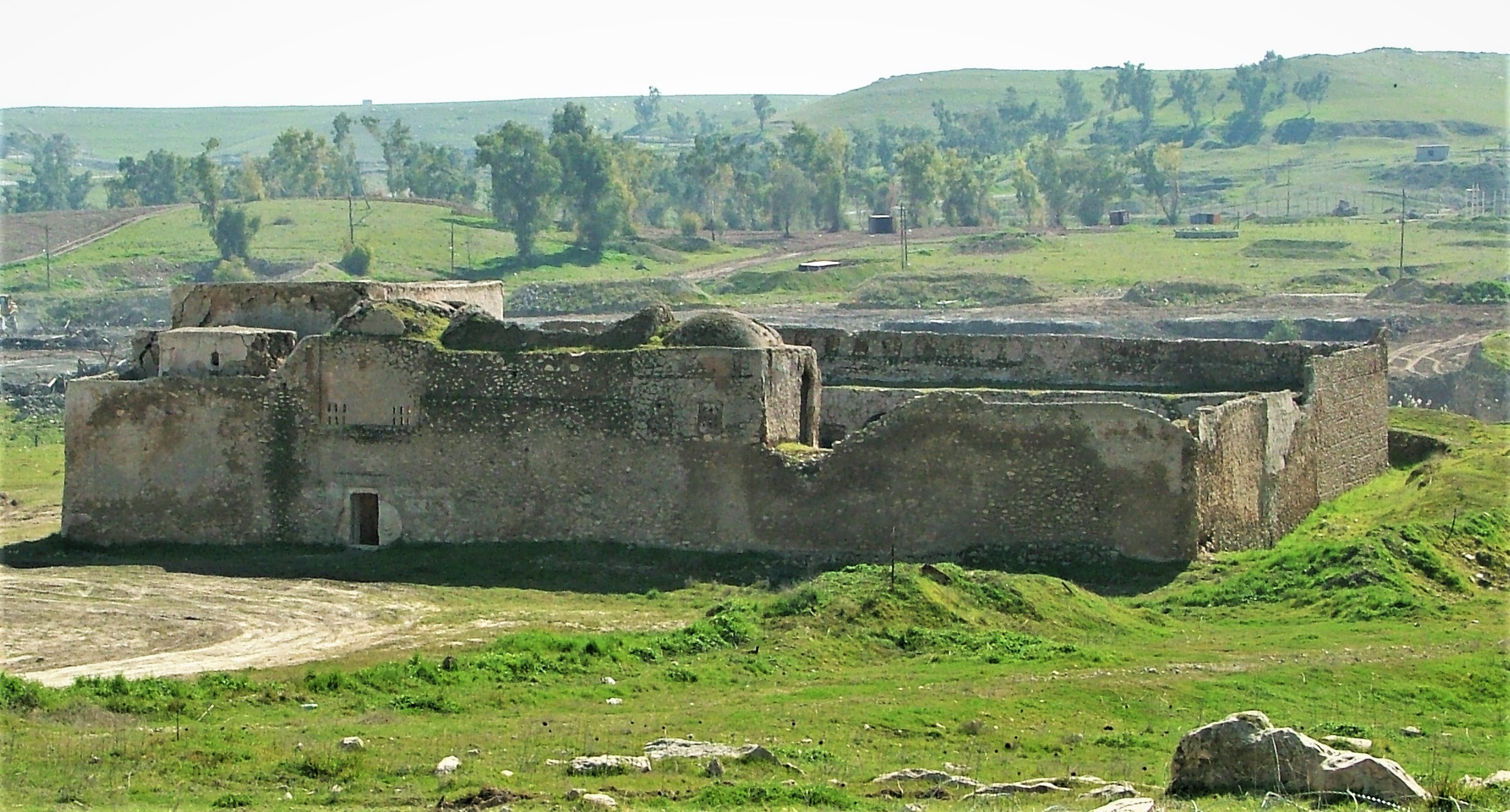
Dair Mar Elia monastery, which was destroyed sometime between late August and September 2014

In June 2014, it was reported that IS elements had been instructed to destroy all churches in Mosul. Since then, most churches within the city have been destroyed.

- The Virgin Mary Church was destroyed with several improvised explosive devices in July 2014.
- Dair Mar Elia, the oldest monastery in Iraq, was demolished sometime between late August and September 2014. The destruction went unreported until January 2016.
- The Al-Tahera Church, built in the early 20th century, was possibly blown up in early February 2015.
- St Markourkas Church, a 10th-century Chaldean Catholic church, was destroyed on 9 March 2015, according to the Iraqi government official Dureid Hikmat Tobia. A nearby cemetery was also bulldozed.
- Another church, which was reportedly "thousands of years" old, was blown up in July 2015. According to Kurdish sources, four children were inadvertently killed when the church was destroyed.
- The Sa'a Qadima Church, which was built in 1872, was blown up in April 2016.

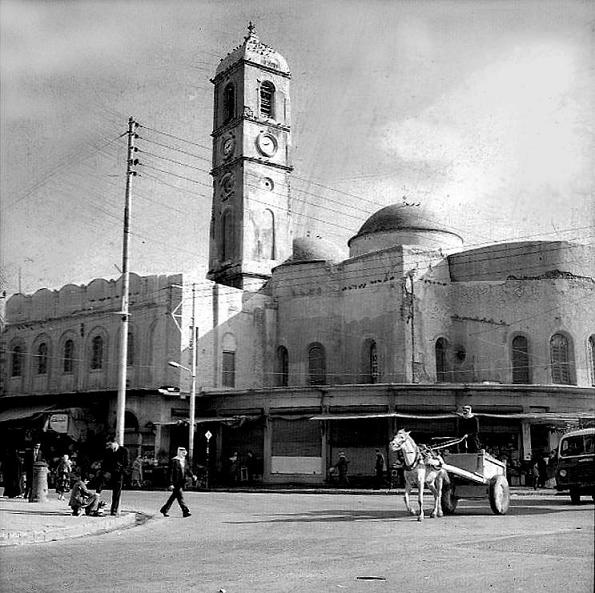
The Sa'a Qadima Church in Mosul, blown up in April 2016

IS also blew up or demolished a number of other churches elsewhere in Iraq or in Syria. The Armenian Genocide Memorial Church in Deir ez-Zor, Syria was blown up by IS militants on 21 September 2014.

On 24 September 2014 IS militants destroyed with improvised explosive devices the 7th-century Green Church (also known as St Ahoadamah Church) belonging to the Assyrian Church of the East in Tikrit.

The Mar Behnam Monastery in Khidr Ilyas near Bakhdida, Iraq was destroyed by IS in March 2015.

On 4 May 2015, IS were reported to have destroyed the Assyrian Christian Virgin Mary Church on Easter Sunday (5 April) in the Syrian town of Tel Nasri. "As the 'joint forces' of Kurdish People's Protection Units and local Assyrian fighters attempted to enter the town", IS set off the explosives destroying what remained of the church. IS had controlled the church since 7 March 2015.

On 21 August 2015, the historic Monastery of St. Elian near Al-Qaryatayn in the Homs Governorate was destroyed by IS.

=== Ancient and medieval sites ===
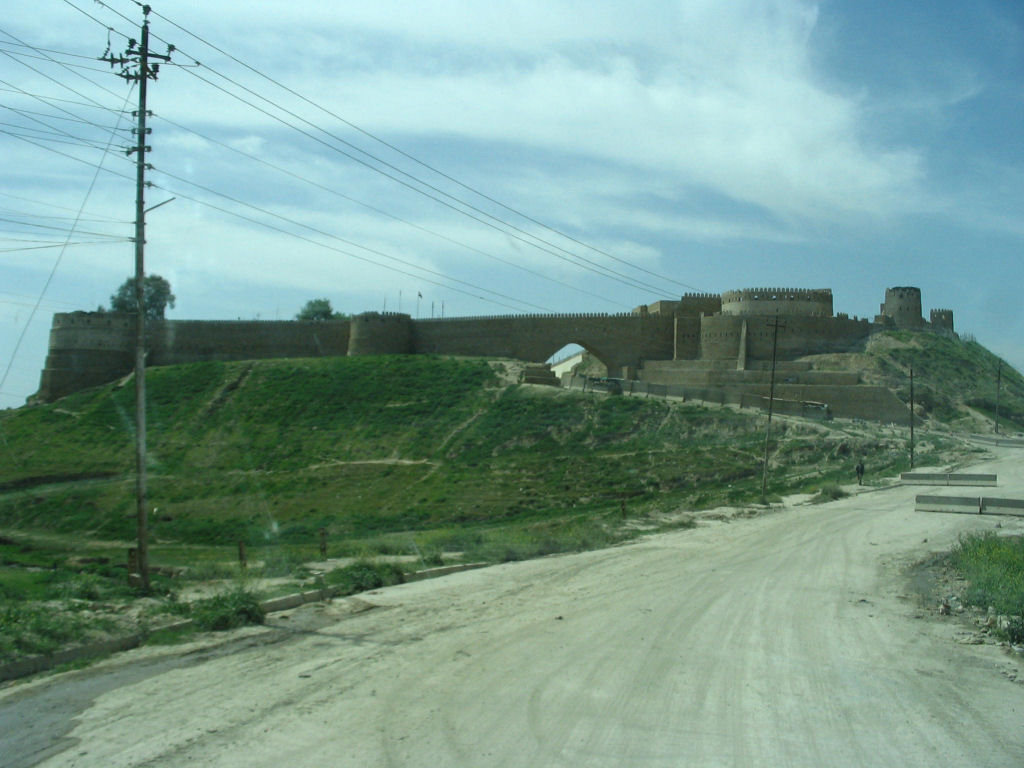
The Tal Afar Citadel (pictured in 2006) was partially obliterated in December 2014

In May 2014, IS members smashed a 3,000-year-old neo-Assyrian statue from Tel Ajaja. Later reports indicated that over 40% of the artifacts at Tel Ajaja (Saddikanni) were looted by IS.

Parts of the Tal Afar Citadel were blown up by IS in December 2014, causing extensive damage.

In January 2015, IS reportedly destroyed large parts of the Nineveh Wall in al-Tahrir neighborhood of Mosul. Further parts of the walls, including the Mashka and Adad Gate, were blown up in April 2016.

In the Syrian city of Raqqa, IS publicly ordered the bulldozing of a colossal ancient Assyrian gateway lion sculpture from the 8th century BC. Another lion statue was also destroyed. Both statues originated from the Arslan Tash archaeological site. The destruction was published in the IS magazine, Dabiq. Among the lost statues are those of Mulla Uthman al-Mawsili, of a woman carrying an urn, and of Abu Tammam.

On 26 February 2015, IS released a video showing the destruction of various ancient artifacts in the Mosul Museum. The affected artifacts originate from the Assyrian era and from the ancient city of Hatra. The video in particular shows the defacement of a granite lamassu statue from the right side of the Nergal Gate by a jackhammer. Several other defaced items in the museum were claimed to be copies, but this was later rebutted by Iraq's Minister of Culture, Adel Sharshab who said: "Mosul Museum had many ancient artifacts, big and small. None of them were transported to the National Museum of Iraq in Baghdad. Thus, all artifacts destroyed in Mosul are original except for four pieces that were made of gypsum".

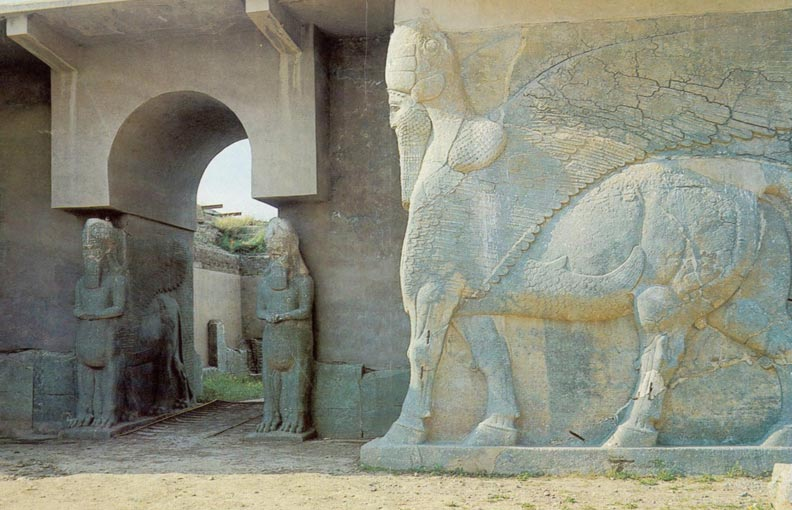
Palace of Ashurnasirpal II in Nimrud, pictured in 2007. IS bulldozed and destroyed the city in March 2015

On 5 March 2015, IS reportedly started the demolition of Nimrud, an Assyrian city from the 13th century BC. The local palace was bulldozed, while lamassu statues at the gates of the palace of Ashurnasirpal II were smashed. A video showing the destruction of Nimrud was released in April 2015. By the time the city was retaken by government forces, 90% of the excavated zone of Nimrud, including Ashurbanipal II's palace, the ziggurat, and its Lamassu statues had been completely destroyed. Since the city's destruction, The Nimrud Rescue Project, funded by the Smithsonian, has worked two seasons on location to train local Iraqi archaeologists and protect and conserve the remains. So far the project has largely been successful in documenting and collecting the remaining artifacts and reliefs; plans for reconstruction are also in the works.

On 7 March 2015, Kurdish sources reported that IS had begun the bulldozing of Hatra, which has been under threat of demolition after IS had occupied the adjacent area. The next day IS attacked Kurdish Peshmerga forces at Dur-Sharrukin, according to a Kurdish official from Mosul, Saeed Mamuzini. Most of the damage was done by the Peshmerga forces trying to militarize the site against IS. Only one looting tunnel was dug at the site.

The Iraqi Tourism and Antiquities Ministry launched the related investigation on the same day. On 8 April 2015, the Iraqi Ministry of Tourism reported that IS destroyed the remnants of the 12th-century Bash Tapia Castle in Mosul. In early July 2015, 20% of Iraq's 10,000 archaeological sites were under IS control.

In 2015 the face of the Winged Bull of Nineveh was damaged.

==== Palmyra ====
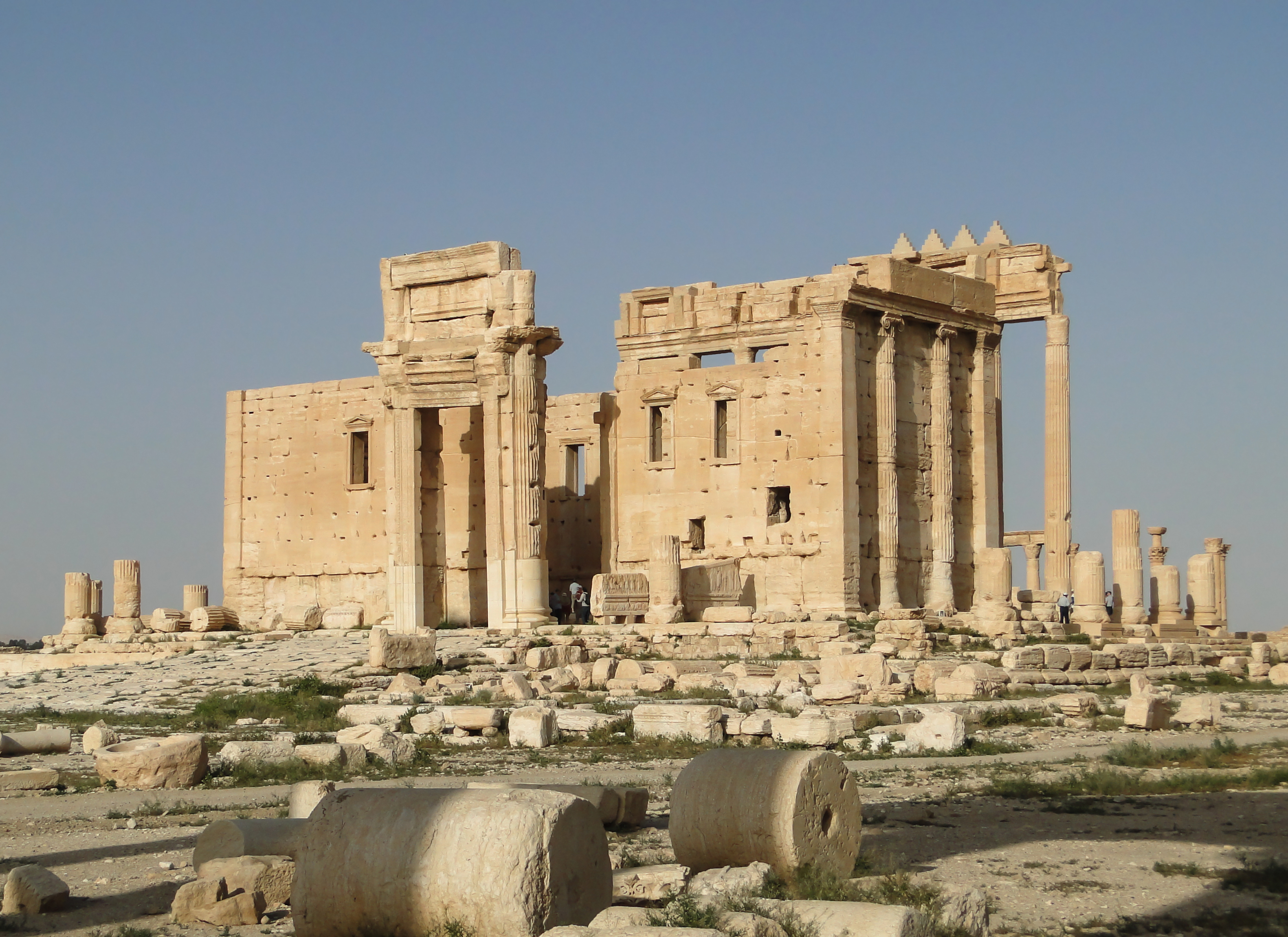
Temple of Bel in Palmyra, which was blown up by IS in August 2015

In anticipation of IS's capture of Palmyra, archaeologists removed hundreds of artefacts from the nearby museum. Following the capture of Palmyra in Syria, IS was reported as not intending to demolish the city's World Heritage Site (while still intending to destroy any statues deemed 'polytheistic'). On 27 May 2015, IS released an 87-second video showing parts of the apparently undamaged ancient colonnades, the Temple of Bel and the Roman theatre. In June 2015, accounts associated with IS released a video showing its members executing twenty-five captured Syrian soldiers at the amphitheater, observed by hundreds of local civilian men, who were reportedly forced to watch. On 27 June 2015, however, IS demolished the ancient Lion of Al-lāt statue in Palmyra. (It has since been restored, and is in storage in a Damascus museum until it can be determined that the statue can be safely returned to Palmyra.) Several other statues from Palmyra reportedly confiscated from a smuggler were also destroyed by IS. In August IS murdered Khaled al-Asaad, an archaeologist and expert on Palmyra, for not disclosing the location of artefacts hidden to keep them safe from IS. On 23 August 2015, it was reported that IS had blown up the 1st-century Temple of Baalshamin. On 30 August 2015, IS demolished the Temple of Bel with explosives. Satellite imagery of the site taken shortly after showed almost nothing remained.

According to the report issued on 3 September 2015 by ASOR Syrian Heritage initiative, IS also destroyed seven ancient tower tombs in Palmyra since the end of June over two phases. The last phase of destruction occurred between 27 August and 2 September 2015, including the destruction of the 2nd-century AD Tower of Elahbel, called "the most prominent example of Palmyra's distinct funerary monuments". Earlier, the ancient tombs of Iamliku and Atenaten were also destroyed. The Monumental Arch was also blown up in October.

When Palmyra was recaptured by Syrian government forces in March 2016, retreating IS fighters blew up parts of the 13th-century Palmyra Castle, causing extensive damage.

IS also continued the looting and demolition of the Parthian/Roman city of Dura-Europos begun by looters during the Syrian Civil War. Nicknamed "the Pompeii of the desert", the city was of particular archaeological significance.

In January 2017, during the militants’ second occupation after their recapture of Palmyra in December 2016, it was reported that IS had destroyed the facade of the Roman amphitheater, as well as a tetrapylon.

It was reported on 1 January 2019 that Syrian authorities recovered two Roman-era funerary busts smuggled from Palmyra from an abandoned IS site in the Al-Sukhnah countryside.

==== Hatra ====
Hatra (Arabic: الحضر, romanized: al-Ḥaḍr) was an ancient city in the Ninawa Governorate and al-Jazira region of Iraq. A large fortified city and capital of the first Arab Kingdom, later it became a Persian client state. Hatra withstood invasions by the Romans in A.D. 116 and 198 thanks to its high, thick walls reinforced by towers. About 240 CE, the city fell to Shāpūr I (reigned c. 240–272), the ruler of the Persian Sāsānian dynasty, and was destroyed. The UNESCO description of the city notes that "the remains of the city, especially the temples where Hellenistic and Roman architecture blend with Eastern decorative features, attest to the greatness of its civilization." The city lies 290 km (180 mi) northwest of Baghdad and 110 km (68 mi) southwest of Mosul.

On 7 March 2015, various sources including Iraqi officials reported that IS had begun demolishing the ruins of Hatra. Video released by IS the next month showed destruction of the monuments. The ancient city was recaptured by the Popular Mobilization Forces on 26 April 2017. Though most of Hatra's temples were relatively unharmed, their interior scriptures and art had been smashed and looted by IS forces.

=== Libraries ===
IS burned or stole collections of books and papers from various locations, including the Central Library of Mosul (which they rigged with explosives and burned down); the library at the University of Mosul; a Sunni Muslim library; a 265-year-old Latin Church and Monastery of the Dominican Fathers; and the Mosul Museum Library. Some destroyed or stolen works date back to 3000 BC and include "Iraq newspapers dating to the early 20th century, maps and books from the Ottoman Empire, and book collections contributed by about 100 of Mosul's establishment families". The stated goal was to destroy all non-Islamic books.

== Response ==
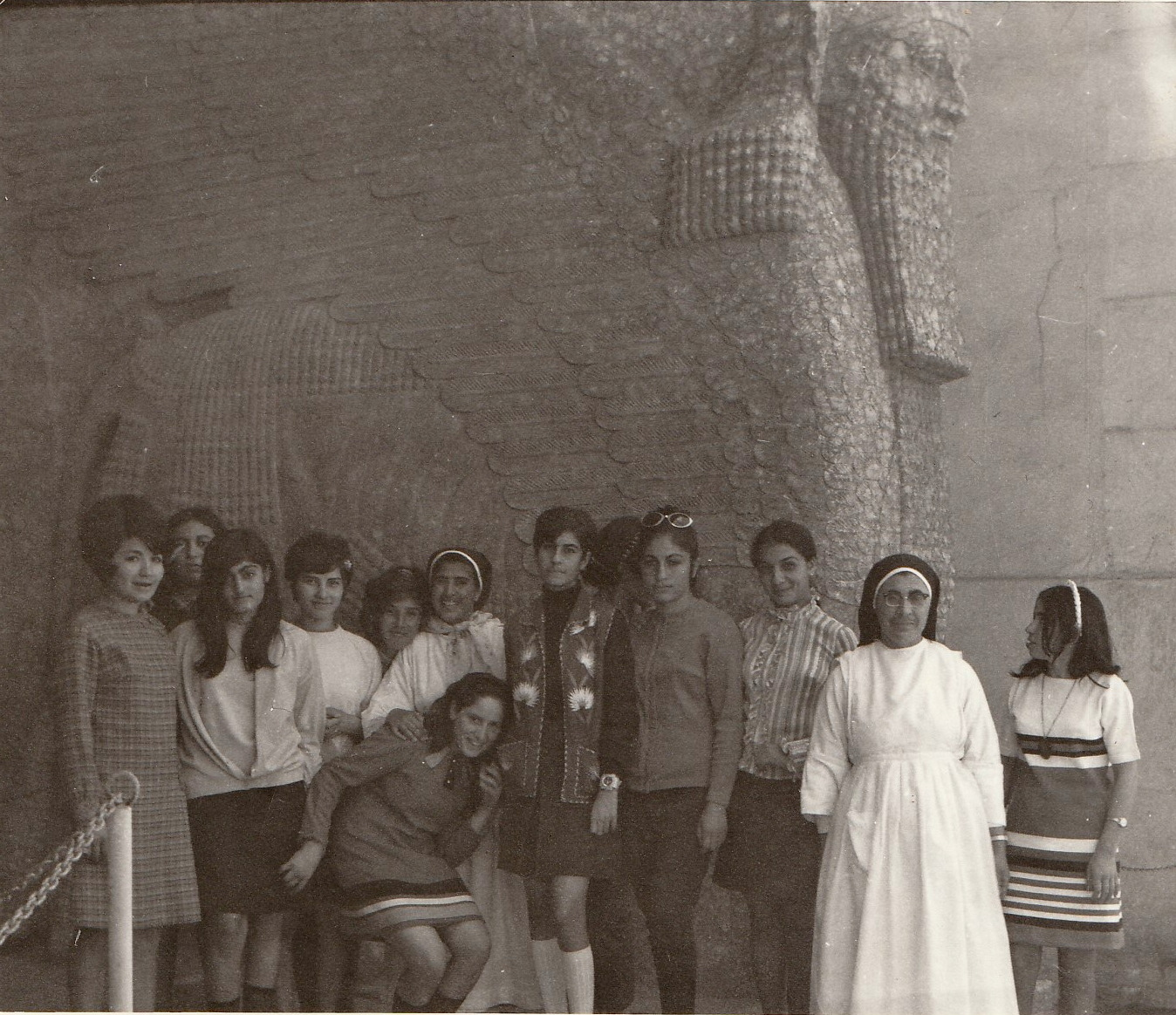
A late 1960s photograph. Lamassu at Mosul’s Nergal Gate, Iraq. This guardian figure gained international notoriety decades later in February 2015, when ISIL released footage of a militant defacing it with a jackhammer.

On 22 September 2014, the United States Secretary of State John Kerry announced that the Department of State had partnered with the American Schools of Orient Research Cultural Heritage Initiatives to "comprehensively document the condition of, and threats to, cultural heritage sites in Iraq and Syria to assess their future restoration, preservation, and protection needs". In 2014, the UNESCO's Committee for the Protection of Cultural Property in the Event of Armed Conflict condemned at the Ninth Meeting "repeated and deliberate attacks against cultural property... in particular in the Syrian Arab Republic and the Republic of Iraq". UNESCO Director-General Irina Bokova called the destructions in Mosul a violation of the United Nations Security Council Resolution 2199, and the destruction of Nimrud a war crime.

Former Prime Minister of Iraq Nouri al-Maliki reported that the local parliamentary tourism and antiquities committee had "filed complaints with the UN to condemn all IS crimes and abuses, including those that affect ancient places of worship". On 28 May 2015, the United Nations General Assembly unanimously passed a resolution, initiated by Germany and Iraq and sponsored by 91 UN member states, stating that IS's destruction of cultural heritage may amount to a war crime and urging international measures to halt such acts, which it described as a "tactic of war".

After the Palmyra temple's destruction in August 2015, the Institute for Digital Archaeology (IDA) announced plans to establish a digital record of historical sites and artifacts threatened by IS advance. To accomplish this goal, the IDA, in collaboration with UNESCO, reported that it would deploy 5,000 3D cameras to partners in the Middle East to capture 3D scans of local ruins and relics. On 18 April 2016, a one-third scale 3D-printed model of the Monumental Arch created by the IDA was unveiled in Trafalgar Square in London by then Mayor of London Boris Johnson, before being displayed in New York City, Dubai, Florence (for the G7 summit), Arona (Italy), Washington, D.C., Geneva, Bern, and Luxembourg from 2016 through 2020.

The general director of the Czech National Museum, Michal Lukeš, signed an agreement in June 2017 committing the institution to help Syria save, preserve and conserve much of its cultural and historical heritage damaged by war, including the ancient site of Palmyra; he met with Maamoun Abdulkarim and discussed plans for the works that were said to have lasted until 2019.

In June 2017, the World Monuments Fund (WMF) announced the launch of a £500,000 scheme to train Syrian refugees near the Syrian-Jordanian border in traditional stone masonry. The aim is teaching them to develop skills necessary to be able to help in restoring cultural heritage sites that have been damaged or destroyed during the Syrian Civil War once peace is restored to Syria.

For years, ideas for major reconstruction have been met with ethical concerns about Palmyra’s use as a tourist site once again, given the recent violence that has occurred there and its place in Palmyra’s history, as well as debates about which countries and organizations should be involved in the reconstruction process. The Association for the Protection of Syria Archaeology (APSA) spoke out against rapid reconstruction, arguing that it would bolster the Syrian regime, which is accused of the mass murder of Syrian citizens.

Minor restorations have already begun: Palmyrene funerary busts of a deceased man and a woman, damaged and defaced by IS, were taken from Palmyra, then to Beirut to be sent off to Rome. Italian experts restored the portraits using 3D technology to print resin prosthetics, which were coated with a thick layer of stone dust to blend in with the original stone; the prosthetics were attached to the damaged faces of the busts using strong magnets. The restored pieces are now back in Syria. Abdulkarim said the restoration of the busts "is the first real, visible positive step that the international community has taken to protect Syrian heritage".

However, the Rewards for Justice Program offers up to $5 million for information leading to disrupt the sale and/or trade of oil and antiquities by IS.

In 2021, it was announced that the Russian State Hermitage Museum, in collaboration with UNESCO and the Syrian Department of Antiquities and Museums, would restore the original Monumental Arch at Palmyra.

== See also ==
- List of destroyed heritage
- Archaeological looting in Iraq
- Buddhas of Bamiyan – Buddhist sculptures demolished by the Taliban in Afghanistan in 2001
- Destruction of early Islamic heritage sites in Saudi Arabia
- Islamist destruction of Timbuktu heritage sites in Mali in 2012
- List of heritage sites damaged during the Syrian Civil War (since 2011)

== Bibliography ==
- Heing, Bridey (2018). Cultural Destruction by ISIS. The Crimes of ISIS. New York: Enslow Publishing. ISBN 9780766092150. LCCN 2017026280.
