= Khan Baghi Castle =

Castle in Kurdistan Province, Iran

Khan Baghi castle
- قلعه خان باغی

General information
- Type: Castle
- Location: Bijar County, Iran

Khan Baghi castle (Persian: قلعه خان باغی) is a historical castle located in Bijar County in Kurdistan Province, The longevity of this fortress dates back to the Historical periods after Islam.

== See also ==
- List of Kurdish castles
