= Xanzad Castle =

Medieval Castle located east of Erbil in Kurdistan-Iraq

Coordinates: 36°21′13″N 44°10′48″E

- قەڵای خانزەند
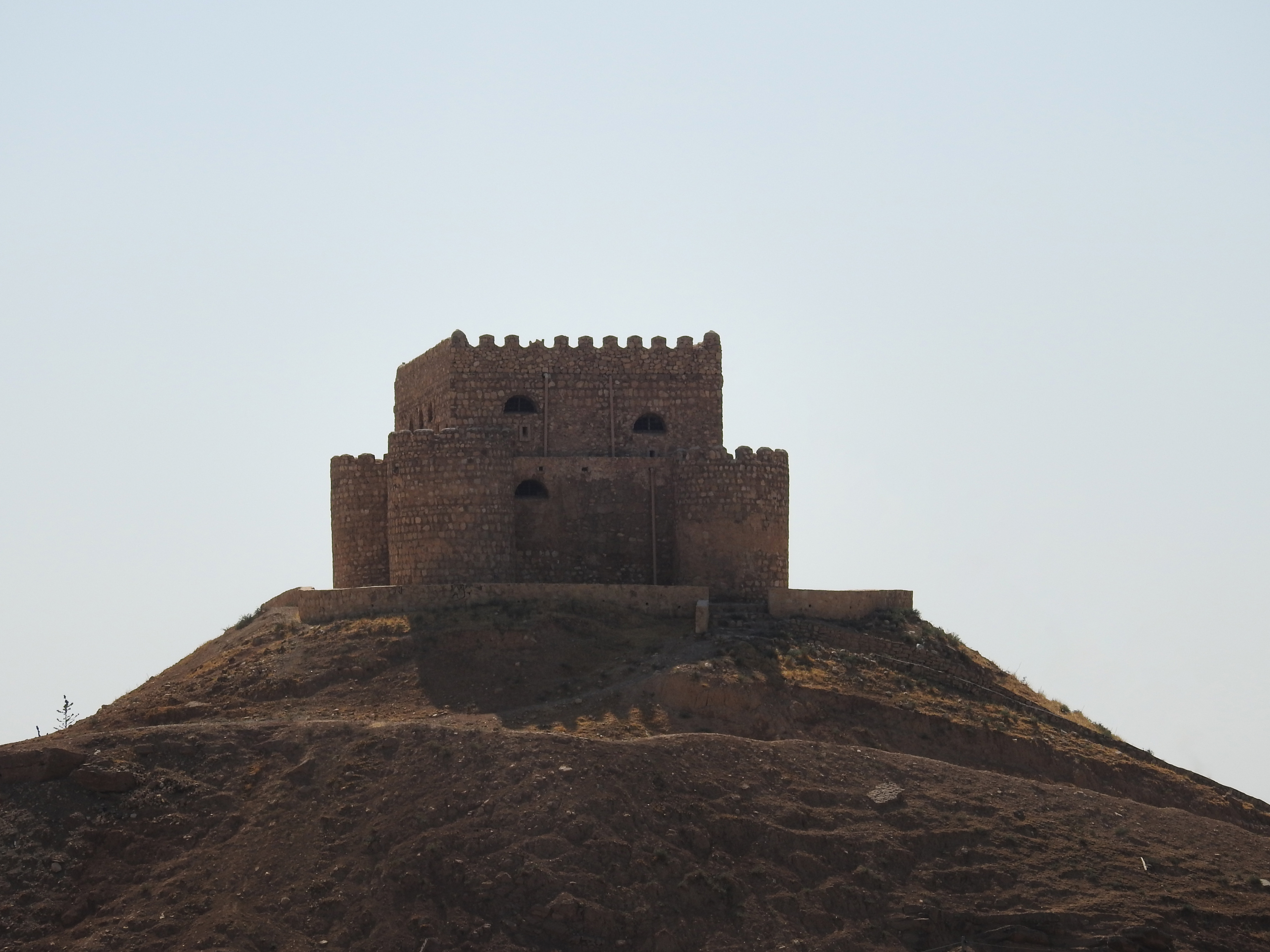
- Interactive map of the Xanzad Castle area
- Alternative names: Khanzad Castle

General information
- Status: Completed
- Location: 953H+HJF, 3, Banaman, Erbil, Iraq, Erbil, Iraq
- Year built: 16th century

Height
- Height: 40 meters

Technical details
- Floor count: two

Xanzad Castle (also written Khanzad) alternatively Banaman Castle, is a medieval castle build by ruler of the Kurdish Soran Emirate, Mir Xanzad in the late 16th century. The castle lies in southern Kurdistan, part of autonomous Kurdistan, itself part of the Republic of Iraq.

== History and geography ==
=== History ===
Xanzad Castle is a medieval castle built by Mir Xanzad the ruler of the Soran Emirate. She ordered it built to serve her as place of residence and as defense of Erbil, her capital. She named the castle after herself.

It is built from stones and gypsum, and it has kept its original shape. Xanzad Castle is 40 meters high and consists of two floors.

Amanj Adil, a local historian, considers it one of the most important archaeological and historical sites of the region. Adil also said; "Mir Khanzad built many other castles across Kurdistan but they have been destroyed, but Khanzad Castle is still in good shape."

=== Location ===
The castle is located east of Erbil, on the Erbil-Shaqlawa Road. It sits atop a hill a mere 22 kilometers (14 miles) away from the capital.

== Legacy ==
=== Among Kurds ===
Reza Shamal, a local from Erbil said;

"This castle is proof that Kurdish people once had their own country [...]"

Khanzad Bakir, another local from Erbil said;

"I've visited the castle so many times because it gives me strength and pride."

== See also ==
- List of castles in Iraq
- List of Kurdish castles

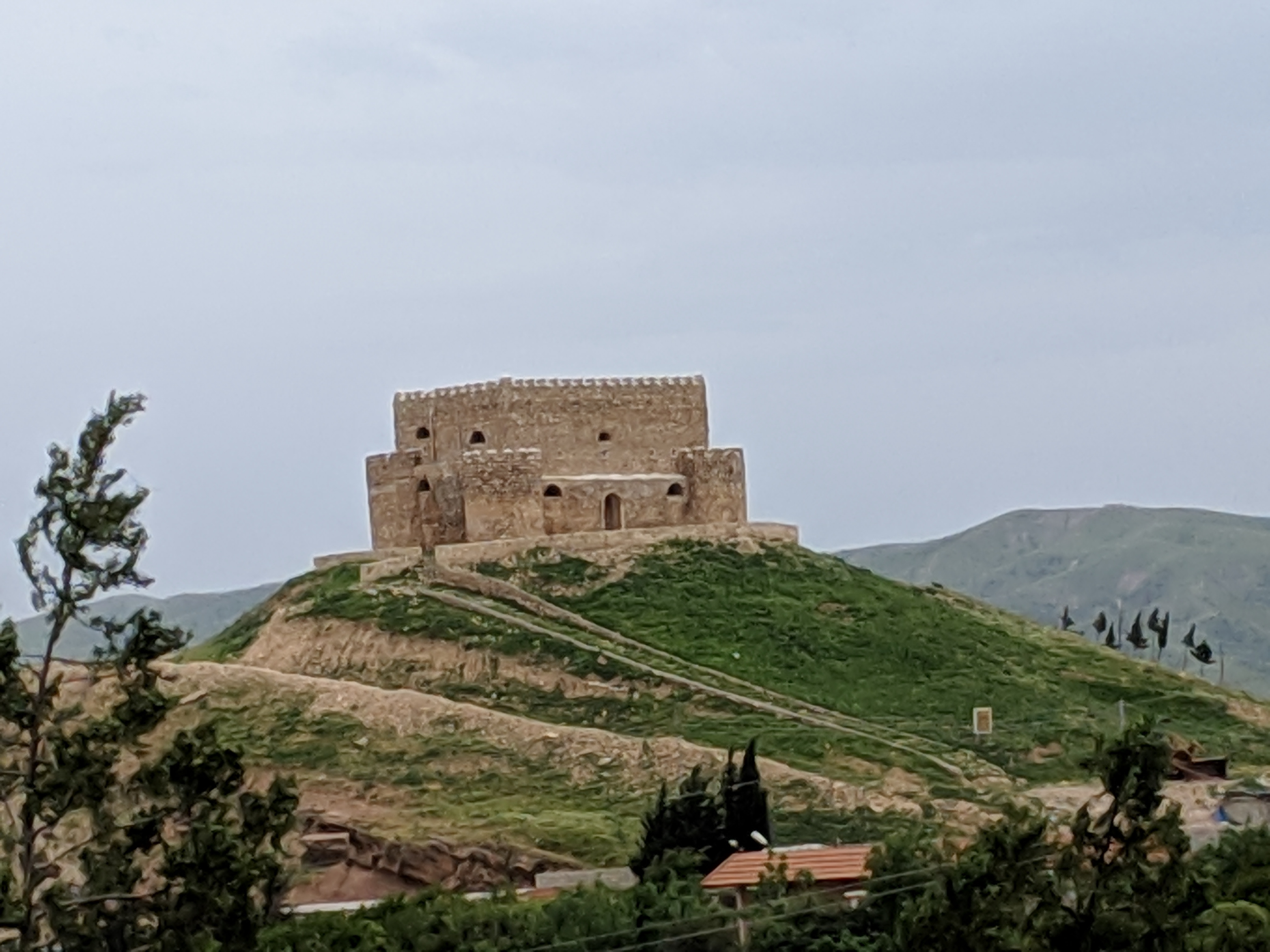
Another view of the castle.
