= Barvish Kani Castle =

Castle in Kurdistan Province, Iran

Barvish Kani castle
- قلعه برویشکانی

General information
- Type: Castle
- Location: Baneh County, Iran

Barvish Kani castle (Persian: قلعه برویشکانی) is a historical castle located in Baneh County in Kurdistan Province.

== See also ==
- List of Kurdish castles
