= Aghli Beg Castle =

Castle in Kurdistan Province, Iran

Aghli Beg castle
- قلعه اغلی بگ

General information
- Type: Castle
- Location: Baneh County, Iran

Aghli Beg castle (Persian: قلعه اغلی بگ) is a historical castle located in Baneh County in Kurdistan Province.

== See also ==
- List of castles in Iran
- List of Kurdish castles
