= Bash Tapia Castle =

Castle in Iraq

- باشطابيا
- Mosul, Iraq
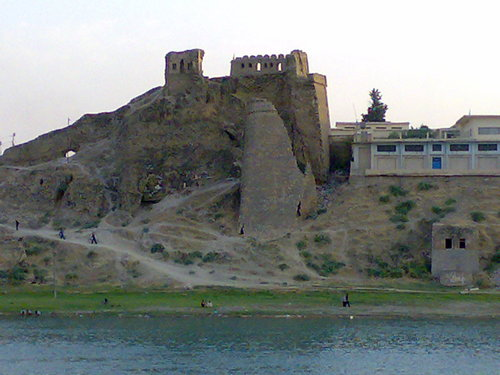
- Ruins of Bash Tapia Castle in 2014

Site information
- Type: Castle
- Condition: Ruins

Location
- Bash Tapia Castle
- Coordinates: 36°21′19.4″N 43°7′17.7″E

Site history
- Built: 12th century
- Materials: Stone and stucco
- Fate: Partially destroyed, 2015
- Battles/wars: Ottoman–Persian War (1743–46)

Bash Tapia Castle, (Arabic: باشطابيا) also known as Bashtabiya Castle or Pashtabia Castle, is a ruined 12th-century castle located on the western bank of the Tigris river, forming part of the city wall of Mosul, Iraq. It was partially destroyed by the Islamic State of Iraq and the Levant (ISIL) in April 2015.

== History ==
Bash Tapia Castle was built in the 12th century as one of seven castles within Mosul's city wall. The castle was damaged by Timur in 1393, and was later rebuilt by the Ottoman Empire.

Bash Tapia Castle played an important role in the siege of Mosul during the Ottoman–Persian War of 1743–1746. The siege began on 14 September 1743 when the Shah of Persia, Nader Shah, arrived in city. The Pasha of Mosul, Hajji Hossein Al Jalili, successfully defended the city, and the siege was lifted on 23 October of the same year.

The ruins of the castle were an archaeological site, and were also significant as being one of the few surviving parts of Mosul's walls. The castle was a landmark and a symbol of Mosul's identity, and it was popular with tourists from other parts of Iraq and neighbouring countries. It became neglected after the invasion of Iraq in 2003.

== Destruction ==
The city of Mosul was captured by the Islamic State of Iraq and the Levant on 10 June 2014, and Bash Tapia Castle was damaged in the subsequent fighting. A missile fell near the castle on 10 July and damaged its walls, while a drone fired two shells on it on 23 July.

According to reports by the Iraqi Ministry of Tourism, the castle was blown up by ISIL in April 2015, making it one of many heritage sites destroyed by that group. Photos released by ISIL in 2016 show that parts of the castle remain intact. The remains of the castle were recaptured by the Iraqi Army in June 2017.

== See also ==
- list of castles in Iraq
