= Qala Qureh Castle =

Castle in Kurdistan Province, Iran

Qala Qureh castle
- قلعه قلا قوره

General information
- Type: Castle
- Location: Bijar County, Iran

Qala Qureh castle (Persian: قلعه قلا قوره) is a historical castle located in Bijar County in Kurdistan Province.

== See also ==
- List of Kurdish castles
