= Sarmaj Castle =

Castle in Kermanshah Province, Iran

Sarmaj castle
- قلعه سرماج

General information
- Type: Castle
- Location: Harsin County, Iran

Sarmaj castle (Persian: قلعه سرماج) is a historical castle located in Harsin County in Kermanshah Province, The longevity of this fortress dates back to the Sasanian Empire.
