= Al-Nabi Yunus Mosque =

Destroyed mosque in Mosul, Iraq

- جَامِع ٱلنَّبِي يُوْنُس
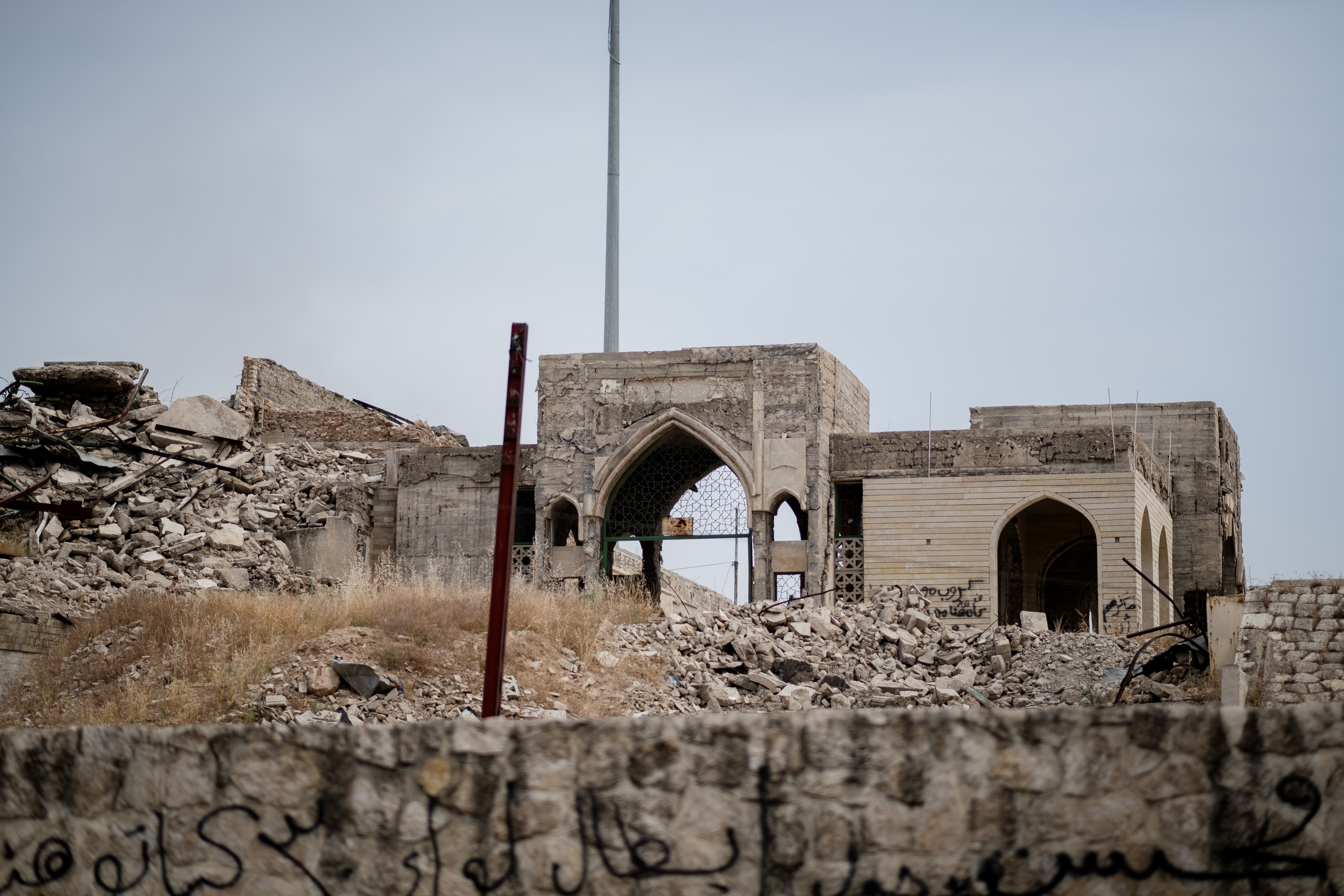
- The destroyed mosque and shrine in 2019

- Location of the destroyed mosque in Iraq

Religion
- Affiliation: Sunni Islam (former)
- Ecclesiastical or organizational status: Congregational mosque; Shrine (1365–2014)
- Status: Destroyed (2014) (under reconstruction)

Location
- Location: Mosul, Mosul District, Nineveh Governorate
- Country: Iraq
- Interactive map of Al-Nabi Yunus Mosque
- Coordinates: 36°20′53″N 43°9′34″E

Architecture
- Type: Islamic architecture
- Established: 1365 CE
- Destroyed: 24 July 2014

Specifications
- Dome: One: (destroyed)
- Minaret: One: (destroyed)
- Shrines: Two: Jonah/Yunus (disputed); Shaykh Rashid Lolan
- Materials: Alabaster

Al-Nabi Yunus Mosque (Arabic: جَامِع الٓنَّبِي يُوْنُس, romanized: Jāmiʿ al-Nabī Yūnus, lit. 'Mosque of the Prophet Jonah'), also known as the Mosque of the Prophet Jonah, and the Shrine of Nabi Yunis, (Note: Other names include the Tell Nabī Yūnus, the Nabī Yūnus, the Nabi Yunus, and the Tell Nebi Yunus.) was a historic Sunni congregational mosque and shrine, partially destroyed in 2014, that was located in Mosul, in the Nineveh Governorate of Iraq. It contained a tomb believed to be that of the Abrahamic prophet Jonah, known as Yunus by Muslims. (Note: Academic research suggests that Yunus was not buried there.) After the liberation of Mosul, additional excavations revealed the ruins of a Neo-Assyrian palace beneath the mosque.

== Historical background ==
=== Early history ===
In 1349, the remains of Hnanisho I were exhumed by members of the Church of the East in Mosul. He had been buried in the monastery of Jonah on the east bank of the Tigris, and when the tomb was opened, his body, lying in a coffin of planewood, was said to have been found to be in a miraculous state of preservation. The historian ʿAmr, who saw the body for himself, said that crowds came to view the dead patriarch, who seemed to be only sleeping.

=== Construction of the mosque ===
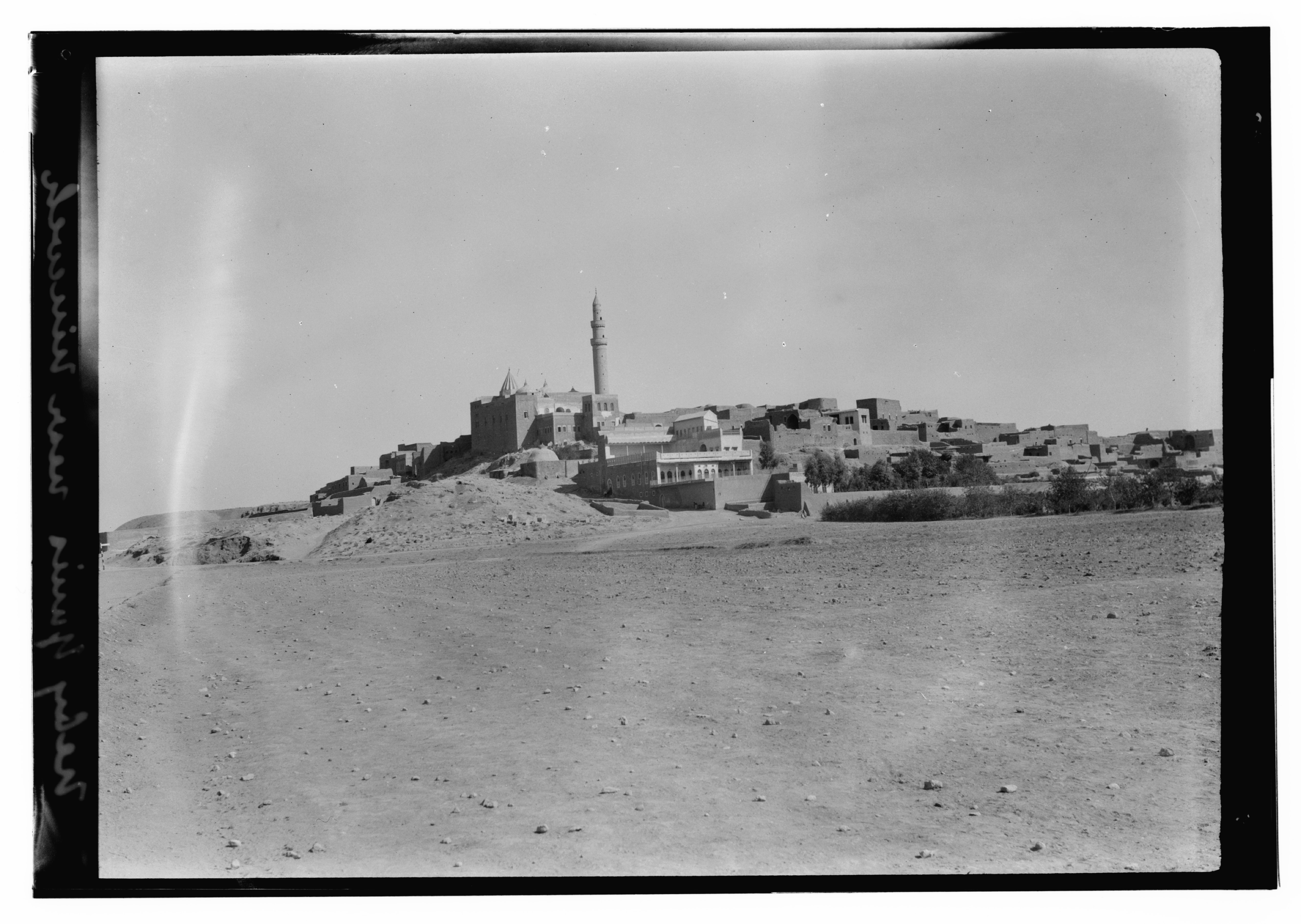
The complex in 1932.

Jalal al-Din Ibrahim al-Khatni destroyed the monastery shortly thereafter. He announced the discovery of the alleged grave of the prophet Jonah during the reconstruction of this site as a congregational mosque in 1365. The Al-Nabi Yunus Mosque was built over the demolished site. When Timur visited it in 1393, it had undergone a remarkable transformation. Hnanishoʿ was no longer remembered, and Timur was shown the tomb of the prophet Jonah himself. The 'tomb of Jonah' still exists, and visitors are still shown a heavy planewood coffin, reverently shrouded with a green cloth, in which the prophet supposedly lies buried. Some historians suspect that for the past six centuries, the Muslim faithful have been paying their devotions to the petrified corpse of a Christian patriarch. The alleged tomb of Jonah was located at a corner of the mosque. The sarcophagus had a wooden zarih built around it.

In addition to Jonah's tomb, a modern shrine to the Naqshbandi shaykh Rashid Lolan was located next to the mosque. This shrine dates from the 1960s.

== Present day ==
=== 2014 destruction ===
On 24 July 2014, the building was destroyed with explosives by the Islamic State, damaging several nearby houses. The Islamic State stated that "the mosque had become a place for apostasy, not prayer."

=== Archeological discoveries ===
In March 2017, after the IS was driven out, a system of tunnels, approximately 1 km (0.62 mi) long, were found under the remains of the mosque. Cuneiform inscriptions dated to the reign of Esarhaddon, ruler of the Neo-Assyrian Empire, have been found in these tunnels, dating the site as a palace built by Sennacherib (d. 681 BCE). In 2025, a 6-meter lamassu, the largest yet to be discovered, was uncovered at the throne room of the site.

== Gallery ==
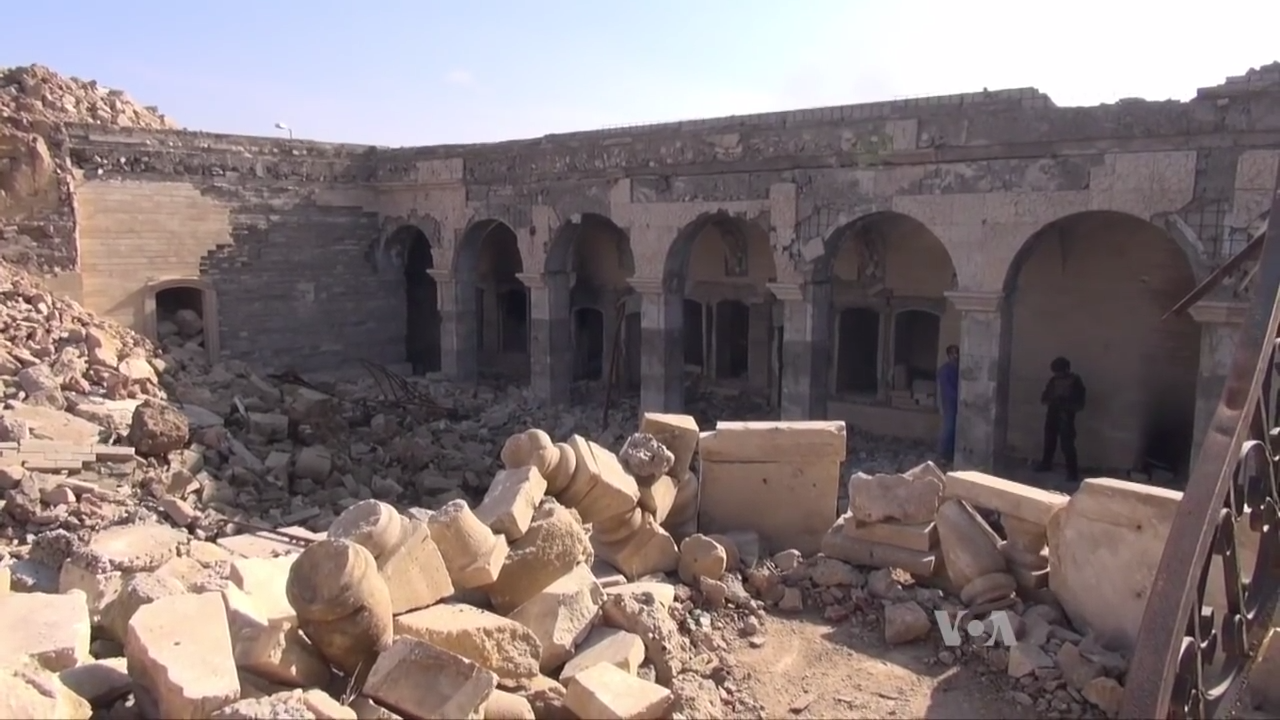
Mosque ruins in 2017

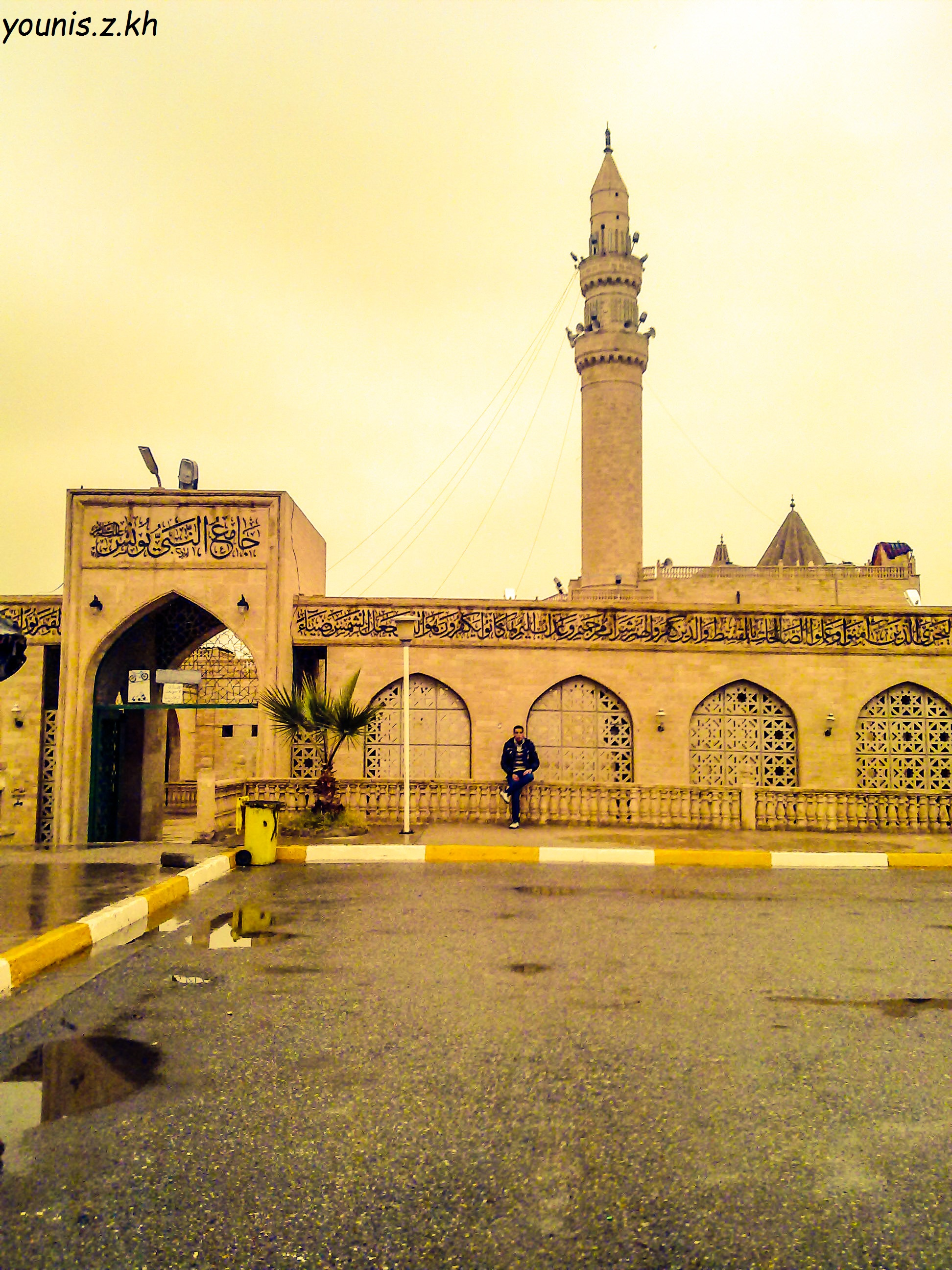
The mosque and shrine in 2011, prior to its 2014 demolition by ISIL

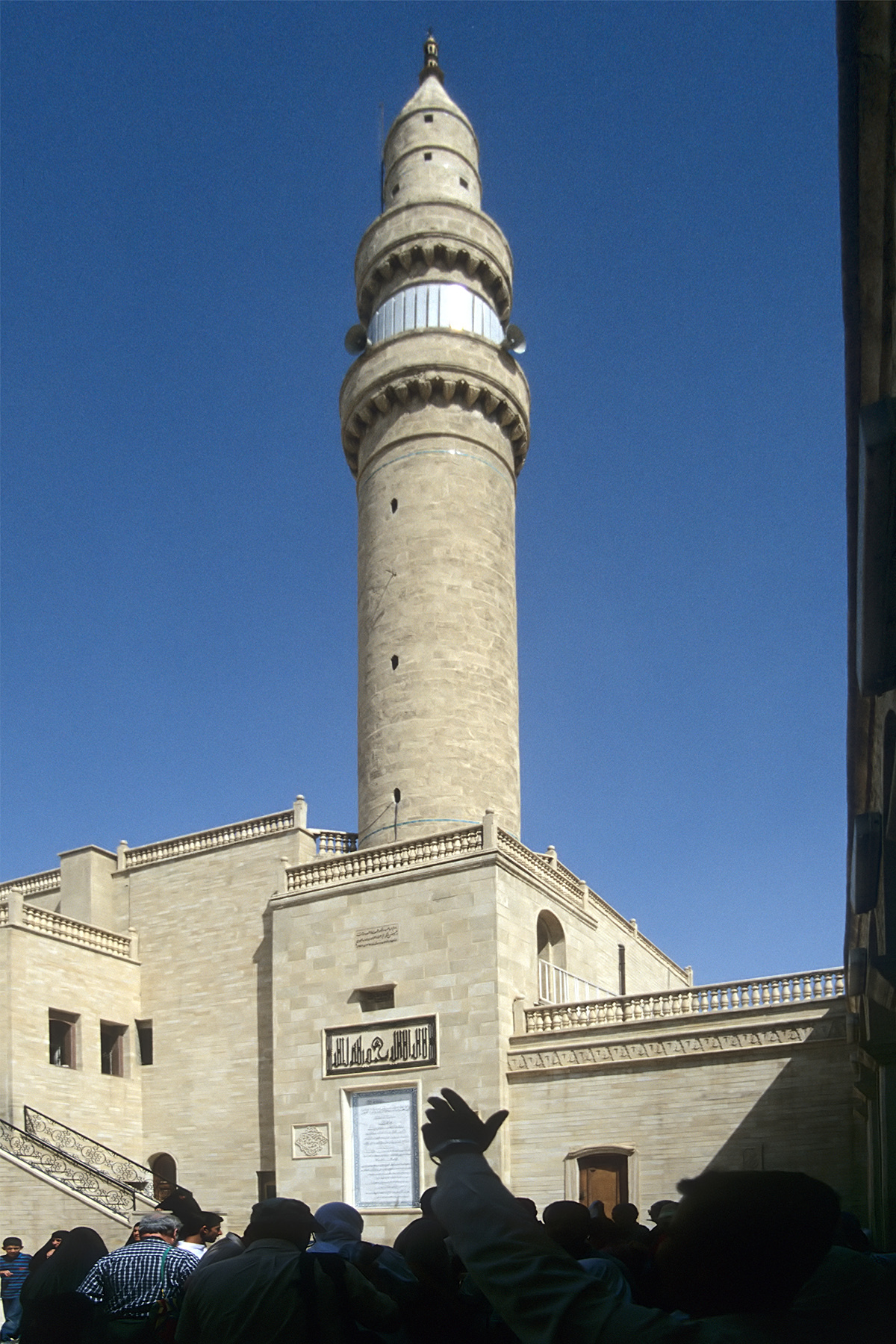
The mosque and shrine in 1999

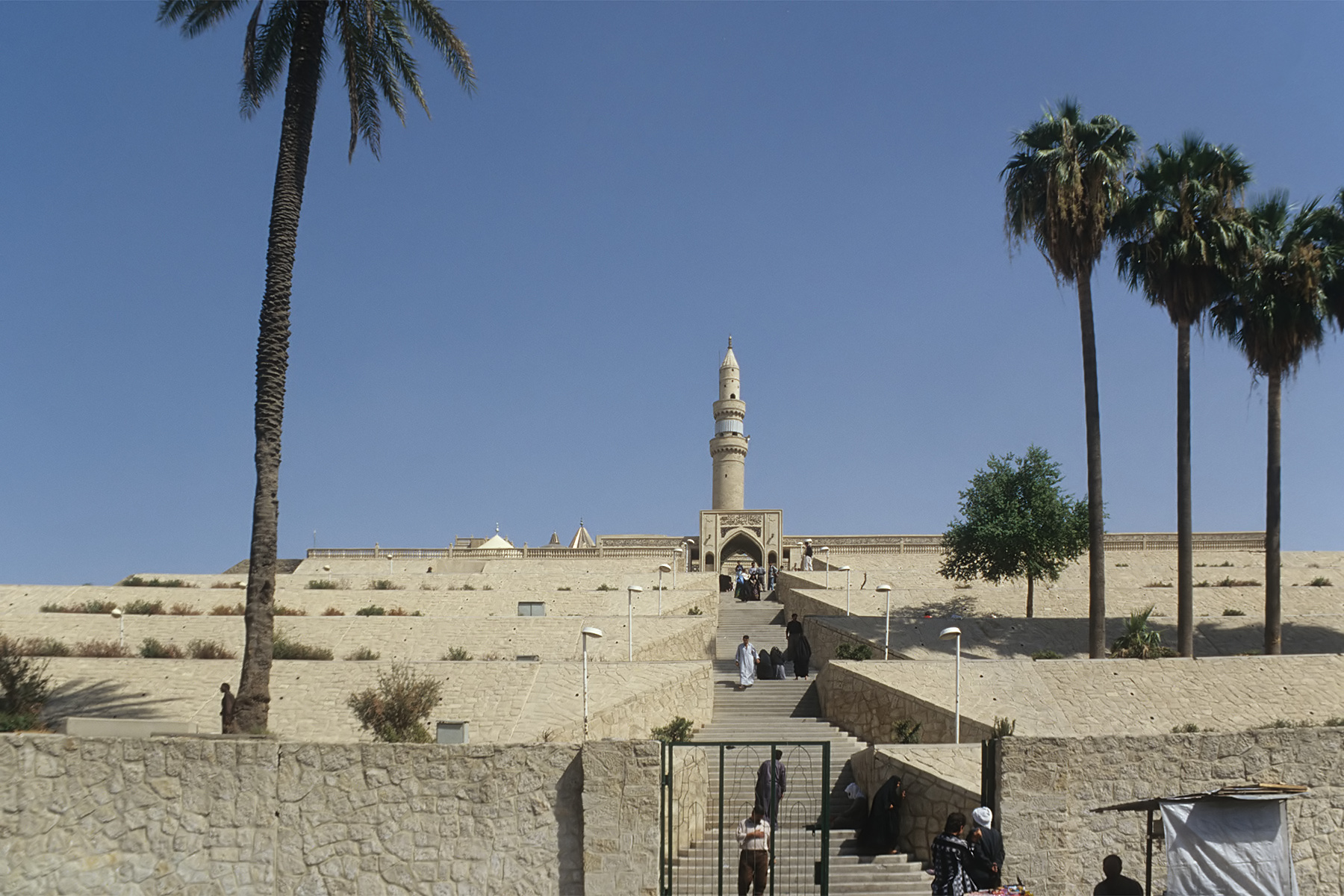
Steps leading to the mosque in 1999

== See also ==
- Destruction of cultural heritage by the Islamic State
- Islam in Iraq
- List of mosques in Iraq
- List of Islamic structures in Mosul
