= List of castles in Iraq =

Castles in Iraq were built in the Ancient and Medieval Times. The castles have played important role in defenses against enemies throughout history.

Name	Location	Picture	Notes
Kirkuk Citadel	Kirkuk		
Fortress of Ukhaidir	Karbala		
Erbil Citadel	Erbil		
Zarb Castle	Ghammas		
Pashtabia Castle	Mosul		
Tel Afar Citadel	Tel Afar		
Xanzad Castle (or Banaman Castle)	Erbil		
Sherwana Castle	Suleymaniyah		
Srochik Castle	Suleymaniyah		
