= Mir Xanzad =

Kurdish Queen ruler of Soran Emirate

Mir Xanzad Kurdish: میر خانزاد
- Queen, ruler and military leader of the Soran Emirate
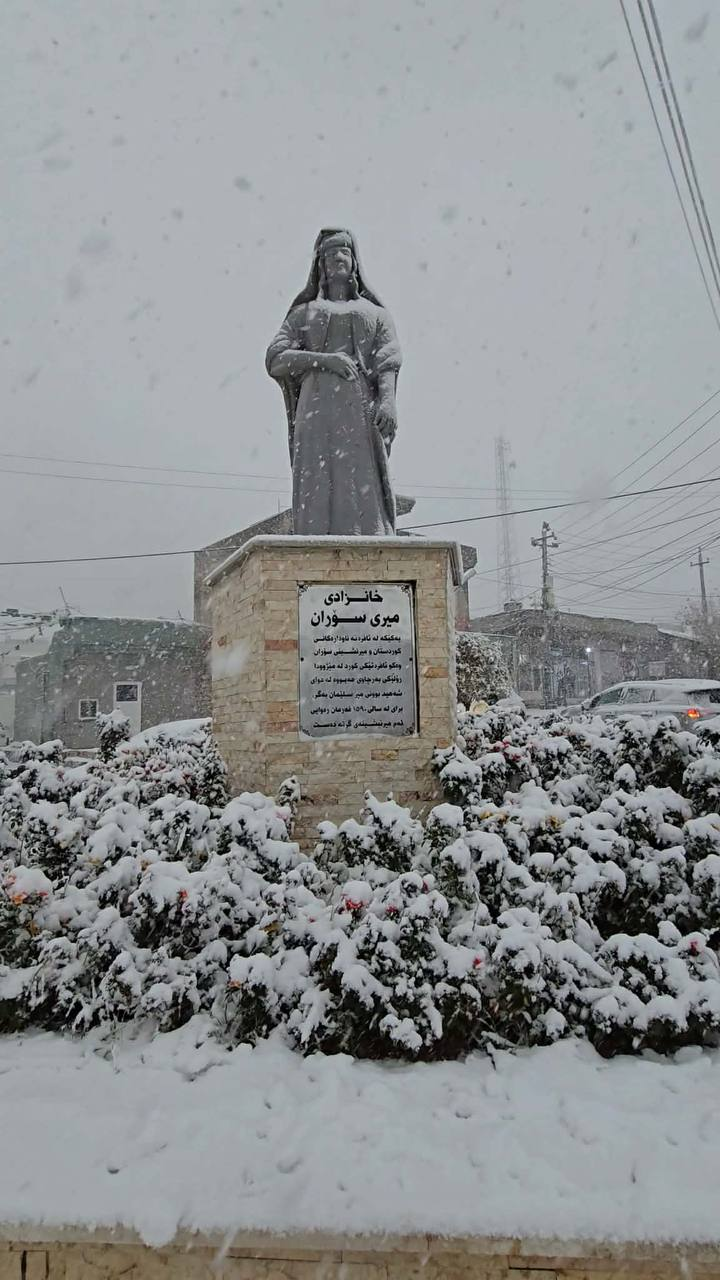
- Xanzad Mir Soran Sclupture in Harir, KRG, 2026.
- Reign: c. 1590–c. 1597 or c. 1617–c. 1661
- Predecessor: Mir Sulaiman
- Successor: Ali Beg
- Born: Soran Emirate
- Died: Soran Emirate
Era name and dates
- Xanzade Xatun Era: c. 1590–c. 1597
- Principality: House of Soran
- Religion: Islam

Mir Xanzad (or Khanzad) was a Kurdish military commander and ruler of the Soran Emirate in the late 16th or early 17th century.

== Biography ==
Xanzad was the sister of Mir Sulaiman, who ruled the Soran Emirate in the Ottoman Empire around 1620. After her brother was murdered by one of his military commanders, Leşkirî, she took over from her brother. Some sources give a date of 1590 for when Xanzad became ruler.

== Rule ==
Leşkirî fled to the Shingal mountains, where Xanzad sent him a letter with a marriage proposal. When Xanzad and Leşkirî met in Harir, Xanzad had Leşkirî and all his men put to death.

She moved the capital from Dwin Qala to Harir, built roads and castles and attacked many surrounding towns at the head of a huge army of 40,000 to 50,000 soldiers, including 12,000 infantry and 10,000 cavalry archers to protect the Soran Emirate from its enemies. During her reign, she ruled over two Kurdish districts called Harir and Soran, constituting the current Erbil governorate.

Xanzad ruled for seven years, and her castle, Xanzad Castle, is still extant, located on a hilltop 22 kilometres from Erbil. Kurdistan 24 listed the castle as an important historical site in Kurdistan, saying that the ruins of the castle are "a dazzling hiking destination over the Harir plains, and are associated with the Kurdish queen Khanzad."

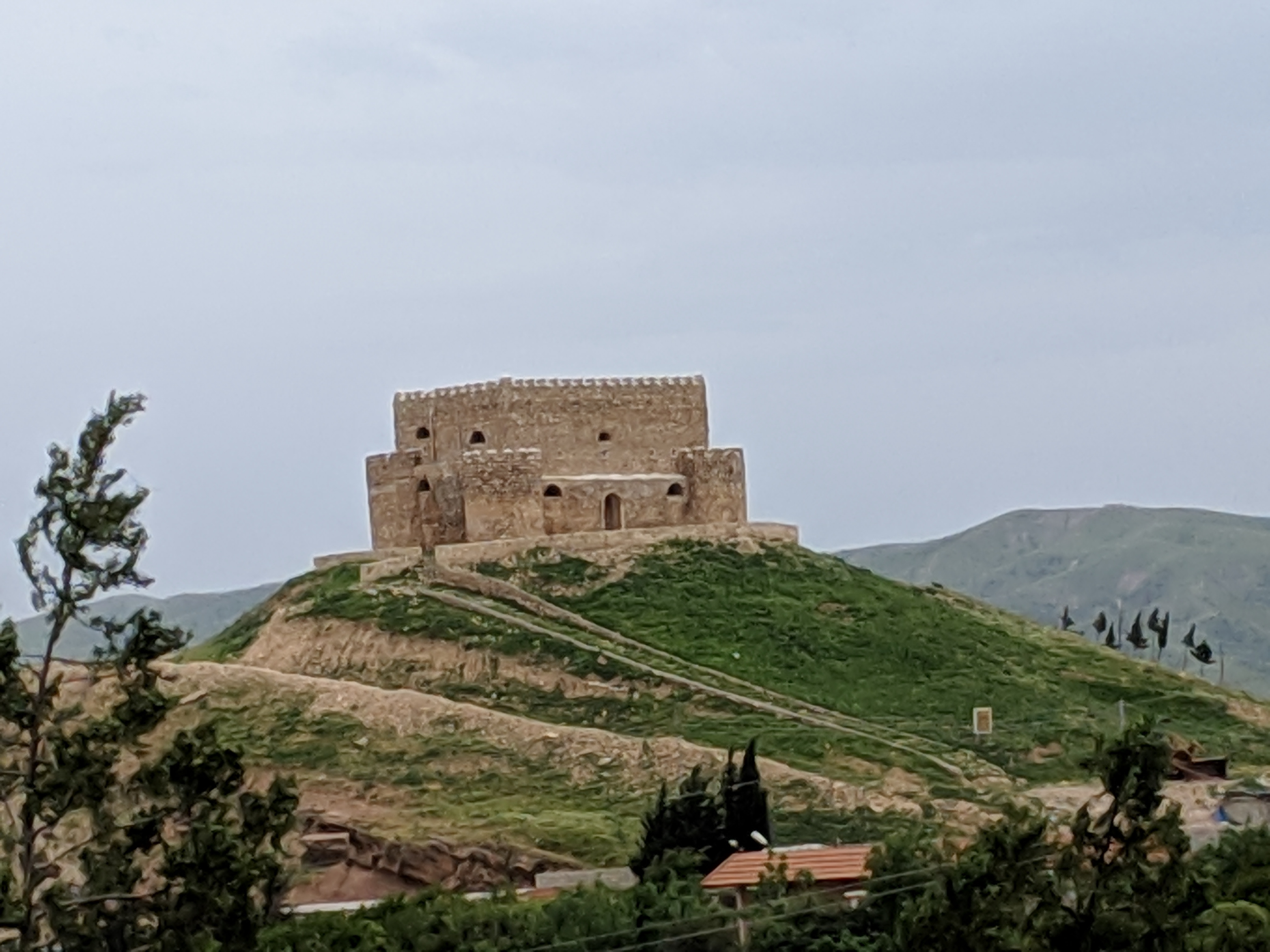
Xanzad Castle, the place which Xanzad ruled for seven years.

Evliya Celebi, a Turkish explorer who lived between 1611 and 1684, described Xanzad in his diary:

In the time of Sultan Murad IV [1623-40], the districts of Harir and Soran were ruled by a venerable lady named Khanzade Sultan. She commanded an army consisting of twelve thousand foot soldiers with firearms and ten thousand mounted archers. On the battlefield, her face hidden by a veil and her body covered with a black cloak, she resembled [the legendary Iranian hero] Sam, the son of Nariman, as she rode her Arabian thoroughbred and performed courageous feats of swordsmanship. At the head of a forty to fifty thousand strong army, she several times carried out raids into Iran, plundering Hamadan, Dargazin, Jamjanab and other considerable cities and returning to Soran victorious, loaded with booty.

The name of Xanzad, the legendary Kurdish warrior queen, remains alive and is commemorated through various Kurdish songs and poems, including the Leşkirî poem.
