= Tomb of the Girl =

Memorial monument in Mosul, Iraq (to 2014)

Religion
- Affiliation: The entombed is a Muslim scholar, but the tomb is venerated by Yazidis.
- District: Bab Sinjar
- Status: Destroyed

Location
- Location: Mosul, Iraq

Architecture
- Type: mausoleum
- Completed: 20th century (before 1922)

The Tomb of the Girl (Arabic: قبر البنت) was a memorial monument located at Bab Sinjar in Mosul, Iraq. The monument was alleged to be a burial place of a female mystic, hence its name, but in reality, it was a memorial built over the grave of Muslim historian Ibn al-Athir. It was located in the middle of a road as well. The monument was bulldozed in 2014 by the Islamic State of Iraq and the Levant.

== History ==
Ibn al-Athir died in 1232 and was buried in the cemetery of Qadib al-Ban al-Mawsili. In the early 20th century, the district of Bab Sinjar underwent modernization, so roads for vehicles were built, and this required the clearing of the cemetery. The government, unwilling to destroy the tomb of a respected scholar, instead plastered the grave and built a small domed memorial over it.

== The legend of the Girl ==
The monument received its name because of an erroneous legend, stemming from a British writer who visited Mosul in 1922. She claimed that the tomb was dedicated to a female saint who died of a broken heart, and the legend appeared in the news and media of that time, spreading worldwide. The Yazidis believe that the tomb is of a female mystic who married an Emir of Mosul, but died of poisoning, which caused the Emir great sadness, so he built the memorial as commemoration.

The government, aware of the spread of the false legend, installed a marble stele on the monument to indicate that the grave belonged to Ibn al-Athir. The stele also lists down some of Ibn al-Athir's works like Al-Kamil fi Al-Tarikh.

== Demolition ==
The monument was bulldozed in 2014 by the Islamic State of Iraq and the Levant, who used a digger to raze the structure. This was part of a campaign to purge all the historic shrines and raised graves in Mosul.

== See also ==
Al-Lat, another instance where the grave of a man received a feminine attribution.
