= Sar Mazdeh =

Neighborhood in Razavi Khorasan province, Iran

Sar Mazdeh Persian: سرمزده
- Neighborhood
- Location within Iran
- Coordinates: 35°15′18″N 58°16′38″E
- Country: Iran
- Province: Razavi Khorasan
- County: Khalilabad
- District: Central
- City: Khalilabad

Population (2006)
  - Total: 643
- Time zone: UTC+3:30 (IRST)

Sar Mazdeh (Persian: سرمزده) is a neighborhood in the city of Khalilabad in the Central District of Khalilabad County, Razavi Khorasan province, Iran.

== Demographics ==
=== Population ===
At the time of the 2006 National Census, Sar Mazdeh's population was 643 in 173 households, when it was a village in Howmeh Rural District.

After the census, the village was annexed to the city of Khalilabad.
