= Kaheh, Razavi Khorasan =

Village in Razavi Khorasan province, Iran

Kaheh Persian: كاهه
- Village
- Location within Iran
- Coordinates: 35°07′40″N 58°10′14″E
- Country: Iran
- Province: Razavi Khorasan
- County: Khalilabad
- District: Sheshtaraz
- Rural District: Kavir

Population (2016)
  - Total: 1,083
- Time zone: UTC+3:30 (IRST)

Kaheh (Persian: كاهه) (Note: Also romanized as Kāhah and Kāheh) is a village in Kavir Rural District of Sheshtaraz District in Khalilabad County, Razavi Khorasan province, Iran.

== Demographics ==
=== Population ===
At the time of the 2006 National Census, the village's population was 1,005 in 237 households. The following census in 2011 counted 1,053 people in 298 households. The 2016 census measured the population of the village as 1,083 people in 338 households.
