= Mohammadabad, Khalilabad =

Village in Razavi Khorasan province, Iran

Mohammadabad Persian: محمداباد
- Village
- Location within Iran
- Coordinates: 35°15′58″N 58°16′52″E
- Country: Iran
- Province: Razavi Khorasan
- County: Khalilabad
- District: Central
- Rural District: Howmeh

Population (2016)
  - Total: 665
- Time zone: UTC+3:30 (IRST)

Mohammadabad (Persian: محمداباد) (Note: Also romanized as Moḩammadābād) is a village in Howmeh Rural District of the Central District in Khalilabad County, Razavi Khorasan province, Iran.

== Demographics ==
=== Population ===
At the time of the 2006 National Census, the village's population was 612 in 167 households. The following census in 2011 counted 675 people in 200 households. The 2016 census measured the population of the village as 665 people in 227 households.
