= Sheshtaraz =

Sheshtaraz (Persian: ششطراز) may refer to:

- Sheshtaraz District
- Sheshtaraz Rural District
