= Argha, Iran =

Village in Razavi Khorasan province, Iran

Argha Persian: ارغا
- Village
- Location within Iran
- Coordinates: 35°14′07″N 58°13′10″E
- Country: Iran
- Province: Razavi Khorasan
- County: Khalilabad
- District: Sheshtaraz
- Rural District: Sheshtaraz

Population (2016)
  - Total: 2,620
- Time zone: UTC+3:30 (IRST)

Argha (Persian: ارغا) (Note: Also romanized as Arghā) is a village in Sheshtaraz Rural District of Sheshtaraz District in Khalilabad County, Razavi Khorasan province, Iran.

== Demographics ==
=== Population ===
At the time of the 2006 National Census, the village's population was 2,519 in 673 households. The following census in 2011 counted 2,609 people in 785 households. The 2016 census measured the population of the village as 2,620 people in 834 households.
