= Mehdiabad, Khalilabad =

Village in Razavi Khorasan province, Iran

Mehdiabad Persian: مهدي اباد
- Village
- Location within Iran
- Coordinates: 35°02′20″N 58°07′21″E
- Country: Iran
- Province: Razavi Khorasan
- County: Khalilabad
- District: Sheshtaraz
- Rural District: Kavir

Population (2016)
  - Total: 1,196
- Time zone: UTC+3:30 (IRST)

Mehdiabad (Persian: مهدي اباد) (Note: Also romanized as Mehdīābād; also known as Meydān-e Choghowk) is a village in Kavir Rural District of Sheshtaraz District in Khalilabad County, Razavi Khorasan province, Iran.

== Demographics ==
=== Population ===
At the time of the 2006 National Census, the village's population was 1,166 in 336 households. The following census in 2011 counted 1,145 people in 367 households. The 2016 census measured the population of the village as 1,196 people in 404 households.
