= Mirabad, Khalilabad =

Village in Razavi Khorasan province, Iran

Mirabad ميراباد (Persian)
- Village
- Location within Iran
- Coordinates: 35°10′53″N 58°19′58″E
- Country: Iran
- Province: Razavi Khorasan
- County: Khalilabad
- District: Central
- Rural District: Rostaq

Population (2016)
  - Total: 812
- Time zone: UTC+3:30 (IRST)

Mirabad (Persian: ميراباد) (Note: Also romanized as Mīrābād) is a village in Rostaq Rural District of the Central District in Khalilabad County, Razavi Khorasan province, Iran.

== Demographics ==
=== Population ===
At the time of the 2006 National Census, the village's population was 668 in 173 households. The following census in 2011 counted 861 people in 220 households. The 2016 census measured the population of the village as 812 people in 268 households.
