= Ebrahimabad, Khalilabad =

Village in Razavi Khorasan province, Iran

Ebrahimabad نقاب (Persian)
- Village
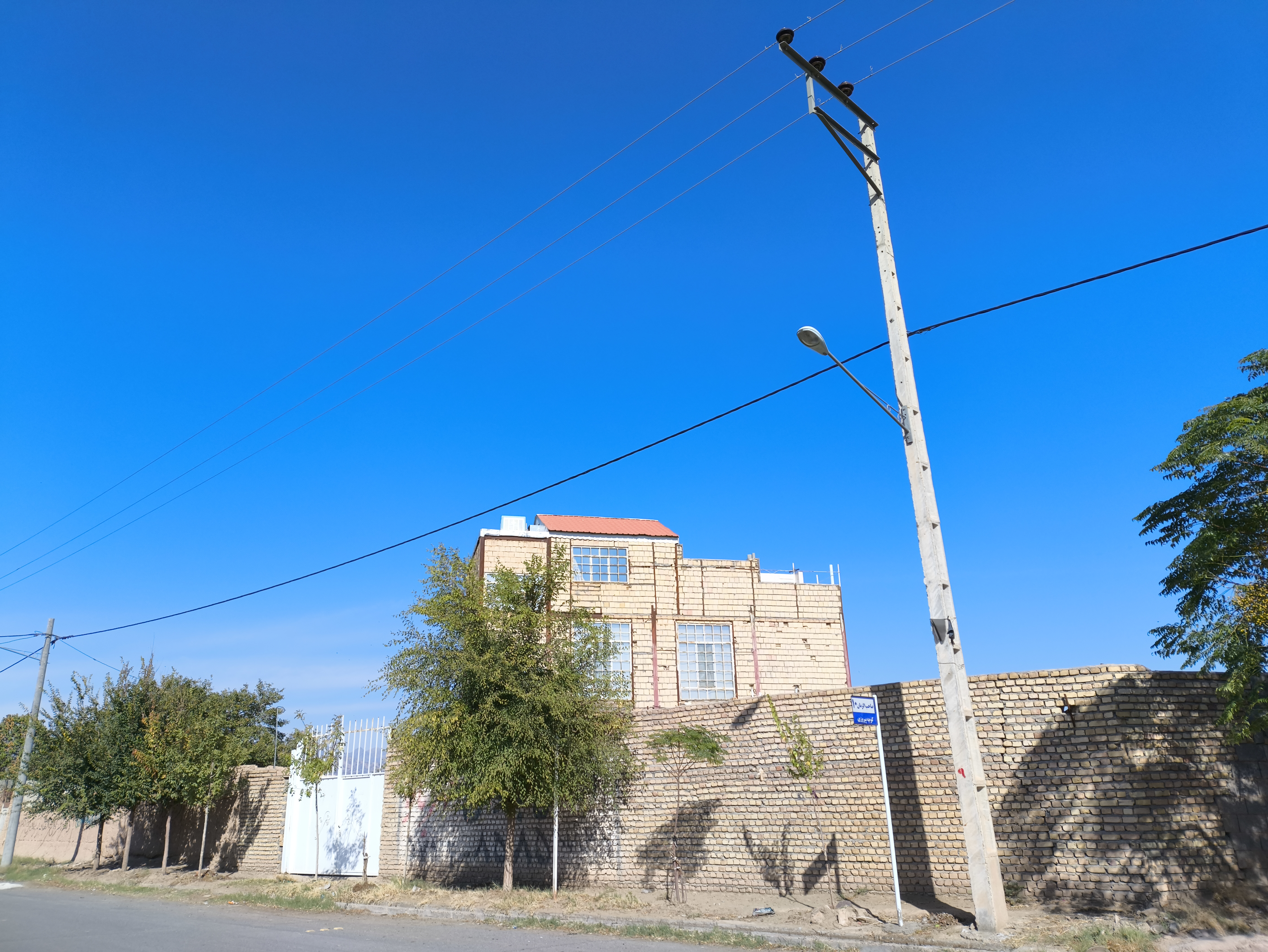
- The village of Ebrahimabad in 2024

- Location within Iran
- Coordinates: 35°13′36″N 58°16′48″E
- Country: Iran
- Province: Razavi Khorasan
- County: Khalilabad
- District: Central
- Rural District: Rostaq

Population (2016)
  - Total: 2,050
- Time zone: UTC+3:30 (IRST)

Ebrahimabad (Persian: ابراهيم اباد) (Note: Also romanized as Ebrāhīmābād) is a village in, and the capital of, Rostaq Rural District in the Central District of Khalilabad County, Razavi Khorasan province, Iran.

== Demographics ==
=== Population ===
At the time of the 2006 National Census, the village's population was 1,964 in 539 households. The following census in 2011 counted 1,951 people in 615 households. The 2016 census measured the population of the village as 2,050 people in 681 households.
