= Jafarabad, Khalilabad =

Village in Razavi Khorasan province, Iran

Jafarabad Persian: جعفراباد
- Village
- Location within Iran
- Coordinates: 35°00′11″N 58°05′24″E
- Country: Iran
- Province: Razavi Khorasan
- County: Khalilabad
- District: Sheshtaraz
- Rural District: Kavir

Population (2016)
  - Total: 1,630
- Time zone: UTC+3:30 (IRST)

Jafarabad (Persian: جعفراباد) (Note: Also romanized as Ja‘farābād) is a village in Kavir Rural District of Sheshtaraz District in Khalilabad County, Razavi Khorasan province, Iran. Most villagers are farmers and cultivate pistachio as well as saffron.

== Demographics ==
=== Population ===
At the time of the 2006 National Census, the village's population was 1,471 in 387 households. The following census in 2011 counted 1,500 people in 455 households. The 2016 census measured the population of the village as 1,630 people in 503 households.
