= Neqab, Khalilabad =

Village in Razavi Khorasan province, Iran

Neqab نقاب (Persian)
- Village
- Location within Iran
- Coordinates: 35°11′08″N 58°20′29″E
- Country: Iran
- Province: Razavi Khorasan
- County: Khalilabad
- District: Central
- Rural District: Rostaq

Population (2016)
  - Total: 2,556
- Time zone: UTC+3:30 (IRST)

Neqab (Persian: نقاب) (Note: Also romanized as Neqāb and Noqāb; also known as Naughab, Nowghāb, and Nowqāb) is a village in Rostaq Rural District of the Central District in Khalilabad County, Razavi Khorasan province, Iran.

== Demographics ==
=== Population ===
At the time of the 2006 National Census, the village's population was 2,248 in 596 households. The following census in 2011 counted 2,461 people in 727 households. The 2016 census measured the population of the village as 2,556 people in 780 households, the most populous in its rural district.
