= Kalateh-ye Shadi =

Village in Razavi Khorasan province, Iran

Kalateh-ye Shadi كلاته شادي (Persian)
- Village
- Location within Iran
- Coordinates: 35°13′45″N 58°19′15″E
- Country: Iran
- Province: Razavi Khorasan
- County: Khalilabad
- District: Central
- Rural District: Rostaq

Population (2016)
  - Total: 814
- Time zone: UTC+3:30 (IRST)

Kalateh-ye Shadi (Persian: كلاته شادي) (Note: Also romanized as Kalāteh-ye Shādī; also known as Kalāteh-ye Shadī) is a village in Rostaq Rural District of the Central District in Khalilabad County, Razavi Khorasan province, Iran.

== Demographics ==
=== Population ===
At the time of the 2006 National Census, the village's population was 913 in 272 households. The following census in 2011 counted 913 people in 295 households. The 2016 census measured the population of the village as 814 people in 281 households.
