= Tak Mar =

Village in Razavi Khorasan province, Iran

Tak Mar Persian: تكمار
- Village
- Location within Iran
- Coordinates: 35°12′15″N 58°11′53″E
- Country: Iran
- Province: Razavi Khorasan
- County: Khalilabad
- District: Sheshtaraz
- Rural District: Sheshtaraz

Population (2016)
  - Total: 721
- Time zone: UTC+3:30 (IRST)

Tak Mar (Persian: تكمار) (Note: Also romanized as Tak Mār) is a village in Sheshtaraz Rural District of Sheshtaraz District in Khalilabad County, Razavi Khorasan province, Iran.

== Demographics ==
=== Population ===
At the time of the 2006 National Census, the village's population was 635 in 167 households. The following census in 2011 counted 692 people in 202 households. The 2016 census measured the population of the village as 721 people in 233 households.
