= Karizak, Khalilabad =

Village in Razavi Khorasan province, Iran

Karizak Persian: كاريزك
- Village
- Location within Iran
- Coordinates: 35°16′36″N 58°13′44″E
- Country: Iran
- Province: Razavi Khorasan
- County: Khalilabad
- District: Central
- Rural District: Howmeh

Population (2016)
  - Total: 665
- Time zone: UTC+3:30 (IRST)

Karizak (Persian: كاريزك) (Note: Also romanized as Kārīzak) is a village in Howmeh Rural District of the Central District in Khalilabad County, Razavi Khorasan province, Iran.

== Demographics ==
=== Population ===
At the time of the 2006 National Census, the village's population was 699 in 190 households. The following census in 2011 counted 781 people in 236 households. The 2016 census measured the population of the village as 820 people in 261 households.
