= Nasrabad, Khalilabad =

Village in Razavi Khorasan province, Iran

Nasrabad Persian: نصراباد
- Village
- Location within Iran
- Coordinates: 35°14′56″N 58°15′56″E
- Country: Iran
- Province: Razavi Khorasan
- County: Khalilabad
- District: Central
- Rural District: Howmeh

Population (2016)
  - Total: 2,182
- Time zone: UTC+3:30 (IRST)

Nasrabad (Persian: نصراباد) (Note: Also romanized as Naşrābād) is a village in, and the capital of, Howmeh Rural District in the Central District of Khalilabad County, Razavi Khorasan province, Iran.

== Demographics ==
=== Population ===
At the time of the 2006 National Census, the village's population was 2,113 in 584 households. The following census in 2011 counted 2,301 people in 701 households. The 2016 census measured the population of the village as 2,182 people in 697 households.
