= Sonbol =

Sonbol may refer to:

== People ==
- Said Sonbol (1929–2004), Egyptian writer
- Sherif Sonbol (b. 1956), Egyptian photographer

== Places ==
- Sonbol, Razavi Khorasan, a village in Razavi Khorasan Province, Iran
