= Haft Khaneh, Razavi Khorasan =

Village in Razavi Khorasan province, Iran

Haft Khaneh هفت خانه (Persian)
- Village
- Location within Iran
- Coordinates: 35°12′40″N 58°17′06″E
- Country: Iran
- Province: Razavi Khorasan
- County: Khalilabad
- District: Central
- Rural District: Rostaq

Population (2016)
  - Total: 428
- Time zone: UTC+3:30 (IRST)

Haft Khaneh (Persian: هفت خانه) (Note: Also romanized as Haft Khāneh, Haftkhaneh, and Haftkhāneh) is a village in Rostaq Rural District of the Central District in Khalilabad County, Razavi Khorasan province, Iran.

== Demographics ==
=== Population ===
At the time of the 2006 National Census, the village's population was 483 in 135 households. The following census in 2011 counted 380 people in 128 households. The 2016 census measured the population of the village as 428 people in 153 households.
