= Hoseynabad, Khalilabad =

Village in Razavi Khorasan province, Iran

Hoseynabad حسين اباد (Persian)
- Village
- Location within Iran
- Coordinates: 35°12′41″N 58°18′15″E
- Country: Iran
- Province: Razavi Khorasan
- County: Khalilabad
- District: Central
- Rural District: Rostaq

Population (2016)
  - Total: 536
- Time zone: UTC+3:30 (IRST)

Hoseynabad (Persian: حسين اباد) (Note: Also romanized as Ḩoseynābād) is a village in Rostaq Rural District of the Central District in Khalilabad County, Razavi Khorasan province, Iran.

== Demographics ==
=== Population ===
At the time of the 2006 National Census, the village's population was 555 in 146 households. The following census in 2011 counted 527 people in 174 households. The 2016 census measured the population of the village as 536 people in 183 households.
