= Shur Ab, Khalilabad =

Village in Razavi Khorasan province, Iran

Shur Ab Persian: شوراب
- Village
- Location within Iran
- Coordinates: 35°01′29″N 58°01′19″E
- Country: Iran
- Province: Razavi Khorasan
- County: Khalilabad
- District: Sheshtaraz
- Rural District: Kavir

Population (2016)
  - Total: 116
- Time zone: UTC+3:30 (IRST)

Shur Ab (Persian: شوراب) (Note: Also romanized as Shūr Āb) is a village in Kavir Rural District of Sheshtaraz District in Khalilabad County, Razavi Khorasan province, Iran.

== Demographics ==
=== Population ===
At the time of the 2006 National Census, the village's population was 93 in 22 households. The following census in 2011 counted 95 people in 27 households. The 2016 census measured the population of the village as 116 people in 36 households.
