= Aliabad-e Shur, Khalilabad =

Village in Razavi Khorasan province, Iran

Aliabad-e Shur Persian: علي ابادشور
- Village
- Location within Iran
- Coordinates: 35°07′24″N 58°12′47″E
- Country: Iran
- Province: Razavi Khorasan
- County: Khalilabad
- District: Sheshtaraz
- Rural District: Kavir

Population (2016)
  - Total: 348
- Time zone: UTC+3:30 (IRST)

Aliabad-e Shur (Persian: علي ابادشور) (Note: Also romanized as ‘Alīābād-e Shūr; also known as ‘Alīābād and ‘Alīābād-e Barkāl) is a village in Kavir Rural District of Sheshtaraz District in Khalilabad County, Razavi Khorasan province, Iran.

== Demographics ==
=== Population ===
At the time of the 2006 National Census, the village's population was 385 in 95 households. The following census in 2011 counted 359 people in 105 households. The 2016 census measured the population of the village as 348 people in 110 households.
