= Mazdeh, Razavi Khorasan =

Village in Razavi Khorasan province, Iran

Mazdeh Persian: مزده
- Village
- Location within Iran
- Coordinates: 35°15′58″N 58°16′10″E
- Country: Iran
- Province: Razavi Khorasan
- County: Khalilabad
- District: Central
- Rural District: Howmeh

Population (2016)
  - Total: 2,648
- Time zone: UTC+3:30 (IRST)

Mazdeh (Persian: مزده) is a village in Howmeh Rural District of the Central District in Khalilabad County, Razavi Khorasan province, Iran.

== Demographics ==
=== Population ===
At the time of the 2006 National Census, the village's population was 2,332 in 627 households. The following census in 2011 counted 2,542 people in 757 households. The 2016 census measured the population of the village as 2,648 people in 835 households.
