= Deh Now, Khalilabad =

Village in Razavi Khorasan province, Iran

Deh Now Persian: دهنو
- Village
- Location within Iran
- Coordinates: 35°14′58″N 58°18′13″E
- Country: Iran
- Province: Razavi Khorasan
- County: Khalilabad
- District: Central
- Rural District: Howmeh

Population (2016)
  - Total: 4,279
- Time zone: UTC+3:30 (IRST)

Deh Now (Persian: دهنو) is a village in Howmeh Rural District of the Central District in Khalilabad County, Razavi Khorasan province, Iran.

== Demographics ==
=== Population ===
At the time of the 2006 National Census, the village's population was 3,832 in 997 households. The following census in 2011 counted 4,288 people in 1,267 households. The 2016 census measured the population of the village as 4,279 people in 1,347 households, the most populous in its rural district.
