= Qohandiz =

Village in Razavi Khorasan province, Iran

Qohandiz Persian: قهنديز
- Village
- Location within Iran
- Coordinates: 35°07′27″N 58°10′51″E
- Country: Iran
- Province: Razavi Khorasan
- County: Khalilabad
- District: Sheshtaraz
- Rural District: Kavir

Population (2016)
  - Total: 40
- Time zone: UTC+3:30 (IRST)

Qohandiz (Persian: قهنديز) (Note: Also romanized as Qohandīz) is a village in Kavir Rural District of Sheshtaraz District in Khalilabad County, Razavi Khorasan province, Iran.

== Demographics ==
=== Population ===
At the time of the 2006 National Census, the village's population was 71 in 22 households. The following census in 2011 counted 51 people in 15 households. The 2016 census measured the population of the village as 40 people in 16 households.
