= Sad ol Din =

Village in Razavi Khorasan province, Iran

Sad ol Din Persian: سعدالدين
- Village
- Location within Iran
- Coordinates: 35°01′19″N 58°06′52″E
- Country: Iran
- Province: Razavi Khorasan
- County: Khalilabad
- District: Sheshtaraz
- Rural District: Kavir

Population (2016)
  - Total: 1,931
- Time zone: UTC+3:30 (IRST)

Sad ol Din (Persian: سعدالدين) (Note: Also romanized as Sa‘d ol Dīn; also known as Sa‘d ed Dīn and Sa‘d od Dīn) is a village in, and the capital of, Kavir Rural District in Sheshtaraz District of Khalilabad County, Razavi Khorasan province, Iran.

== Demographics ==
=== Population ===
At the time of the 2006 National Census, the village's population was 1,965 in 533 households. The following census in 2011 counted 1,929 people in 611 households. The 2016 census measured the population of the village as 1,931 people in 646 households, the most populous in its rural district.
