= Howmeh Rural District (Khalilabad County) =

Rural district in Razavi Khorasan province, Iran

Howmeh Rural District Persian: دهستان حومه
- Rural District
- Location within Iran
- Coordinates: 35°19′N 58°16′E
- Country: Iran
- Province: Razavi Khorasan
- County: Khalilabad
- District: Central
- Established: 2003
- Capital: Nasrabad

Population (2016)
  - Total: 10,594
- Time zone: UTC+3:30 (IRST)

Howmeh Rural District (Persian: دهستان حومه) is in the Central District of Khalilabad County, Razavi Khorasan province, Iran. Its capital is the village of Nasrabad.

== Demographics ==
=== Population ===
At the time of the 2006 National Census, the rural district's population was 10,231 in 2,738 households. There were 10,587 inhabitants in 3,161 households at the following census of 2011. The 2016 census measured the population of the rural district as 10,594 in 3,367 households. The most populous of its 30 villages was Deh Now, with 4,279 people.

=== Other villages in the rural district ===
- Karizak
- Mazdeh
- Mohammadabad

== See also ==
- Sar Mazdeh, a former village and now a neighborhood in the city of Khalilabad
