= Jabuz =

Village in Razavi Khorasan province, Iran

Jabuz Persian: جابوز
- Village
- Location within Iran
- Coordinates: 35°14′03″N 58°04′55″E
- Country: Iran
- Province: Razavi Khorasan
- County: Khalilabad
- District: Sheshtaraz
- Rural District: Sheshtaraz

Population (2016)
  - Total: 3,639
- Time zone: UTC+3:30 (IRST)
- Area code: 0515778
- Website: dehyarijabuz.ir

Jabuz (Persian: جابوز) (Note: Also romanized as Jābūz; also known as Jābūs and Khābūz) is a village in Sheshtaraz Rural District of Sheshtaraz District in Khalilabad County, Razavi Khorasan province, Iran.

== Demographics ==
=== Population ===
At the time of the 2006 National Census, the village's population was 3,044 in 891 households. The following census in 2011 counted 3,367 people in 1,070 households. The 2016 census measured the population of the village as 3,639 people in 1,182 households, the most populous in its rural district.
