= Irajabad =

Irajabad (Persian: ايرج اباد) may refer to:

- Irajabad, Ilam
- Irajabad, Razavi Khorasan
