= Khalilabad, Iran =

City in Razavi Khorasan Province, Iran

Khalilabad خلیل‌آباد
- City
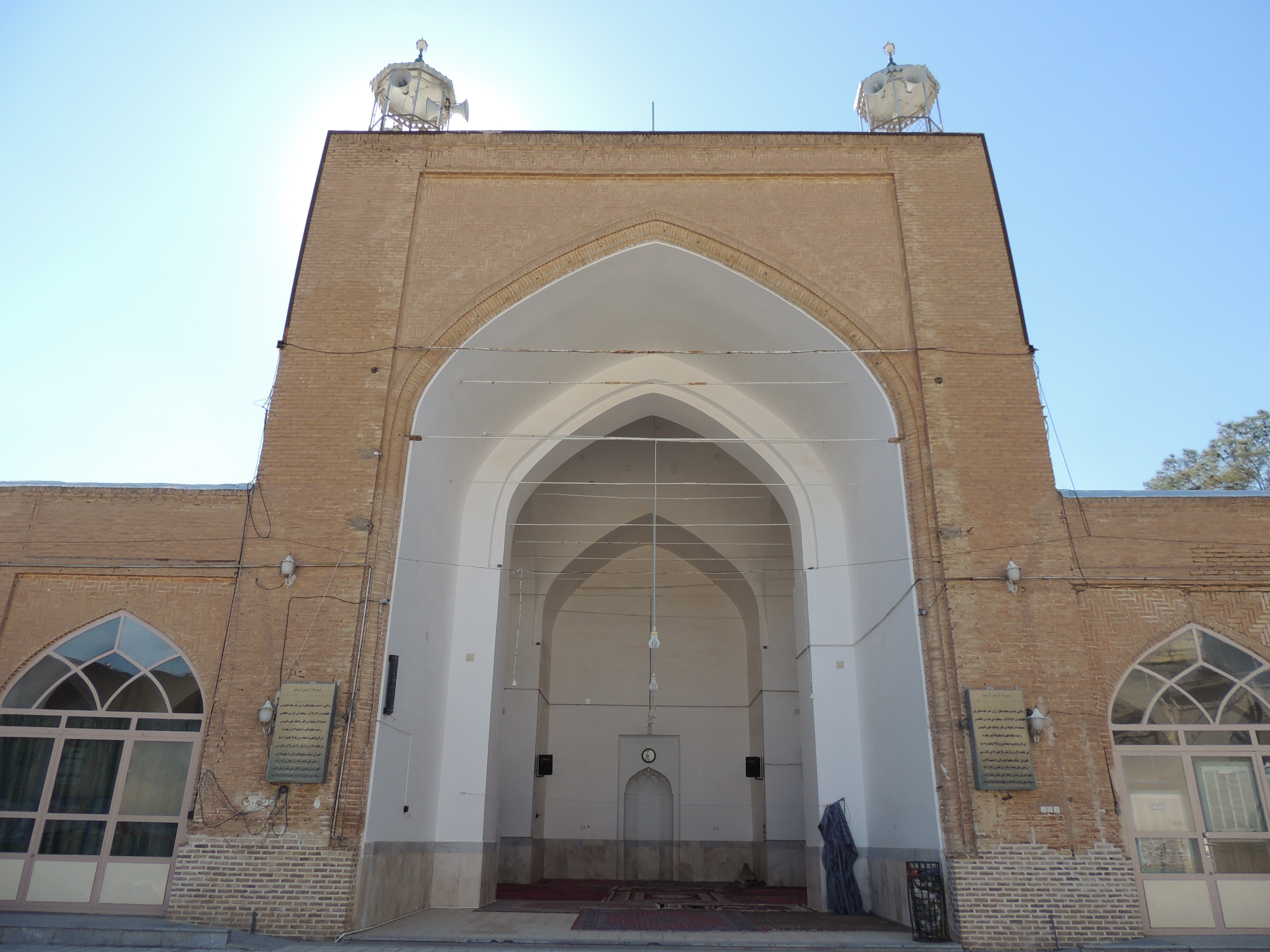
- Jameh Mosque of Khalilabad

- Location within Iran
- Coordinates: 35°15′06″N 58°17′02″E
- Country: Iran
- Province: Razavi Khorasan
- County: Khalilabad
- District: Central

Population (2016 Census)
  - Total: 12,751
- Time zone: UTC+3:30 (IRST)

Khalilabad (Persian: خلیل‌آباد) (Note: Also romanized as Khalīlābād) is a city in the Central District of Khalilabad County, Razavi Khorasan province, Iran, serving as capital of both the county and the district.

== Demographics ==
=== Population ===
At the time of the 2006 National Census, the city's population was 8,409 in 2,324 households. The next census in 2011 counted 11,094 people in 3,271 households. The 2016 census measured the population of the city as 12,751 people in 4,094 households.

There is a spa in Khalilabad called "Germou", meaning warm water. There are two language schools in the city. There is a jungle park in Khalilabad.

== Historical sites, ancient artifacts and tourism ==
=== Beheshti Bathhouse ===
Beheshti Bathhouse is a historical Public bathing related to the Pahlavi dynasty and is located in Khalilabad, Razavi Khorasan Province.

=== Yakhchāl of Geli ===
The Yakhchāl of Geli is a historical Yakhchāl belongs to the Qajar dynasty and is located in Kalilabad, Razavi Khorasan Province in Iran.

=== Imamzadeh Hassan, Khalilabad ===
Imamzadeh Hassan is a Imamzadeh belongs to the Qajar dynasty and is located in Khalilabad County, Razavi Khorasan Province in Iran.

=== Imamzadeh Qasem, Khalilabad ===
Imamzadeh Qasem is a Imamzadeh in Khalilabad County, Razavi Khorasan Province in Iran.

=== Jameh Mosque of Khalilabad ===
Jameh Mosque of Khalilabad dates back to the Pahlavi dynasty and is located in Khalilabad, Razavi Khorasan Province.

=== Khalilabad Hot Spring ===
The Khalilabad Hot Spring is a Hot spring is located in Khalilabad County, Razavi Khorasan Province in Iran.

=== Kondor Ab anbars ===
Kondor Ab anbars is two historical Ab anbars belongs to the first Pahlavi period and is located in Khalilabad County, Sheshtaraz District, Kondor village.

=== Kondor Castle ===
Kondor Castle is a historical castle located in Khalilabad County in Razavi Khorasan Province, The longevity of this fortress dates back to the 5th to 7th centuries AH.

=== Bezanjerd Castle ===
Bezanjerd Castle is a historical castle over 200 years old located in Bezanjerd in Razavi Khorasan Province.

=== Qadamgah Hazrat Ali ===
The Qadamgah Hazrat Ali is a historical site of the Qajar dynasty in Khalilabad County, Razavi Khorasan Province in Iran.

== Gallery ==
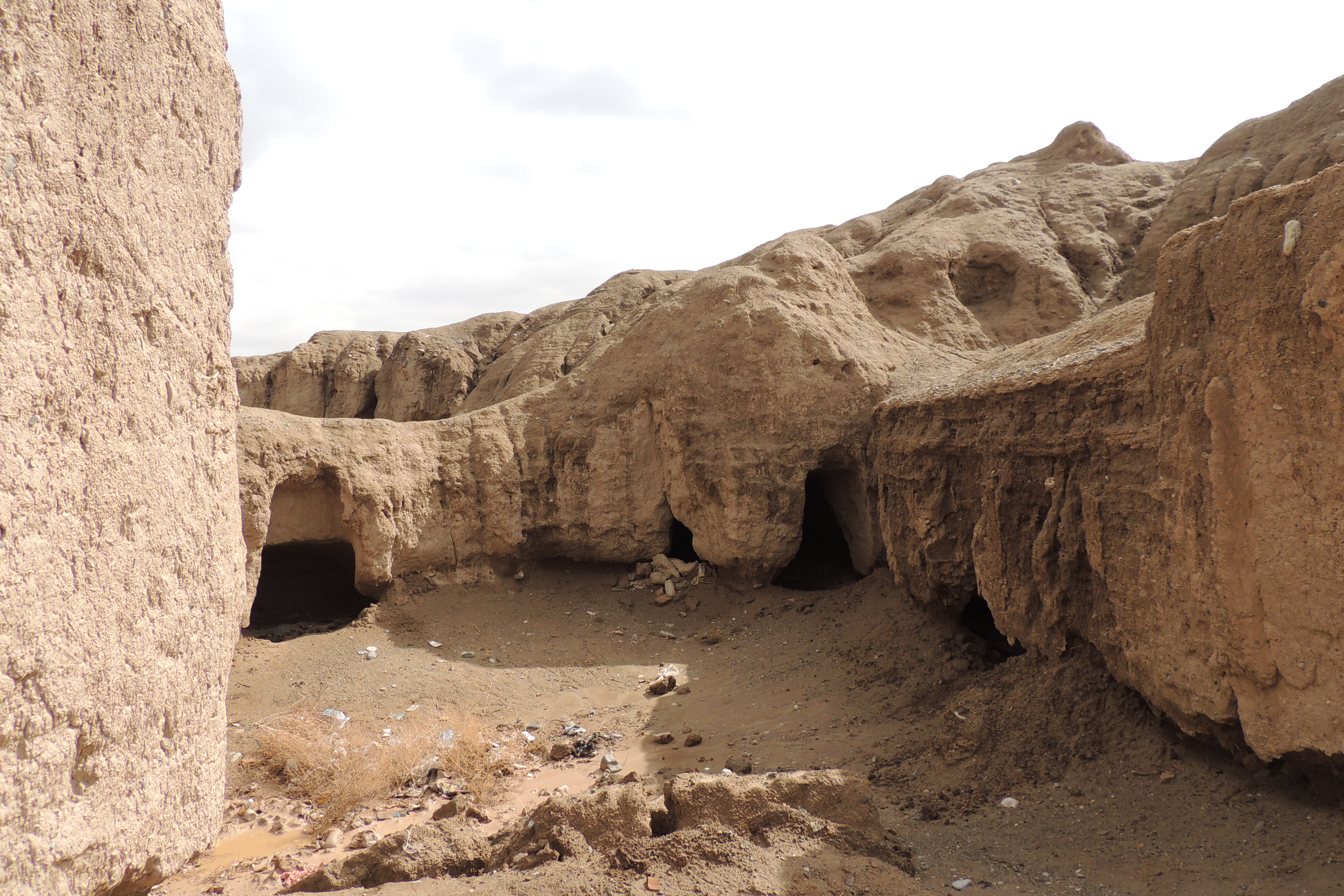
Kondor Castle

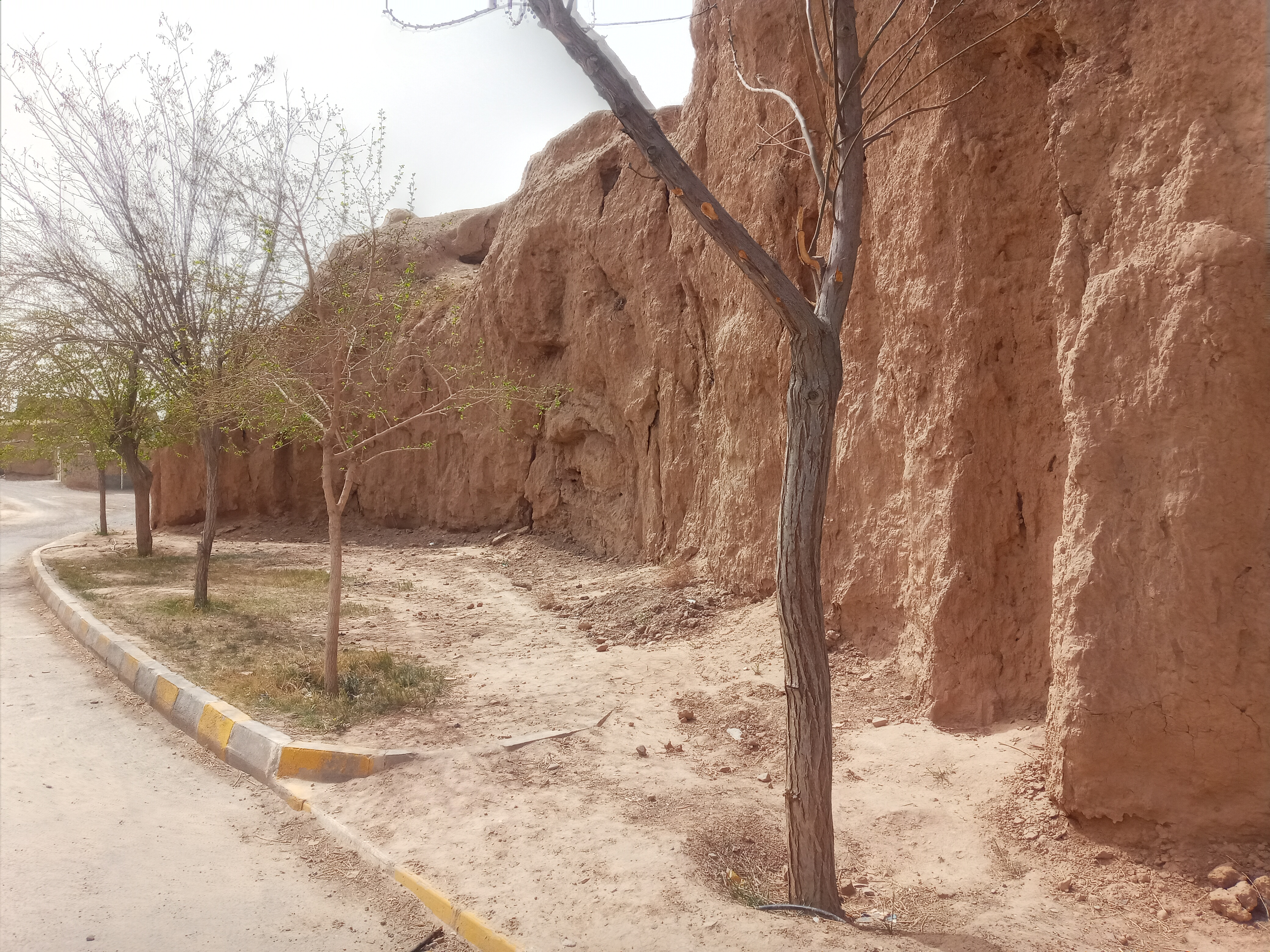
Bezanjerd Castle

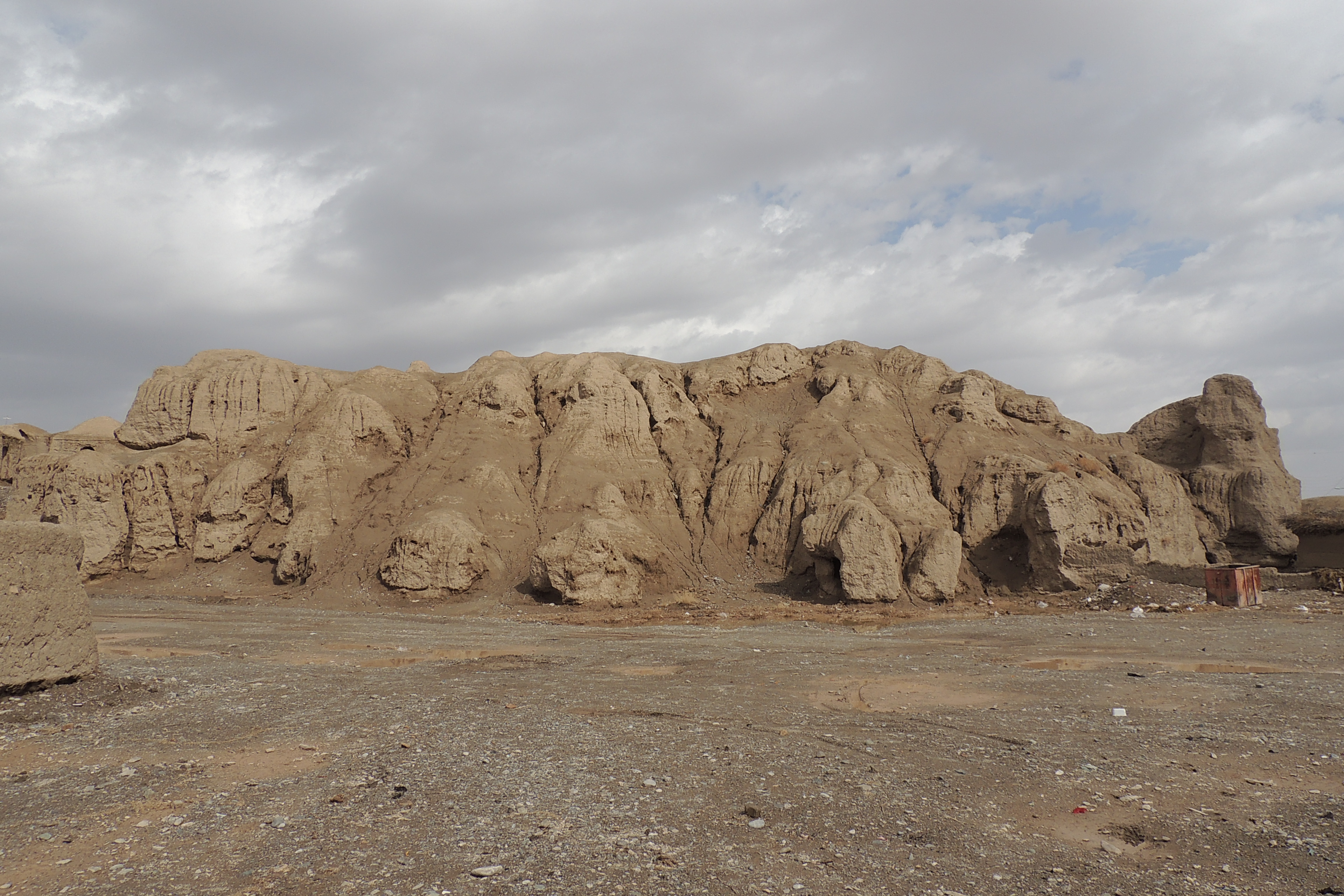
Kondor Castle

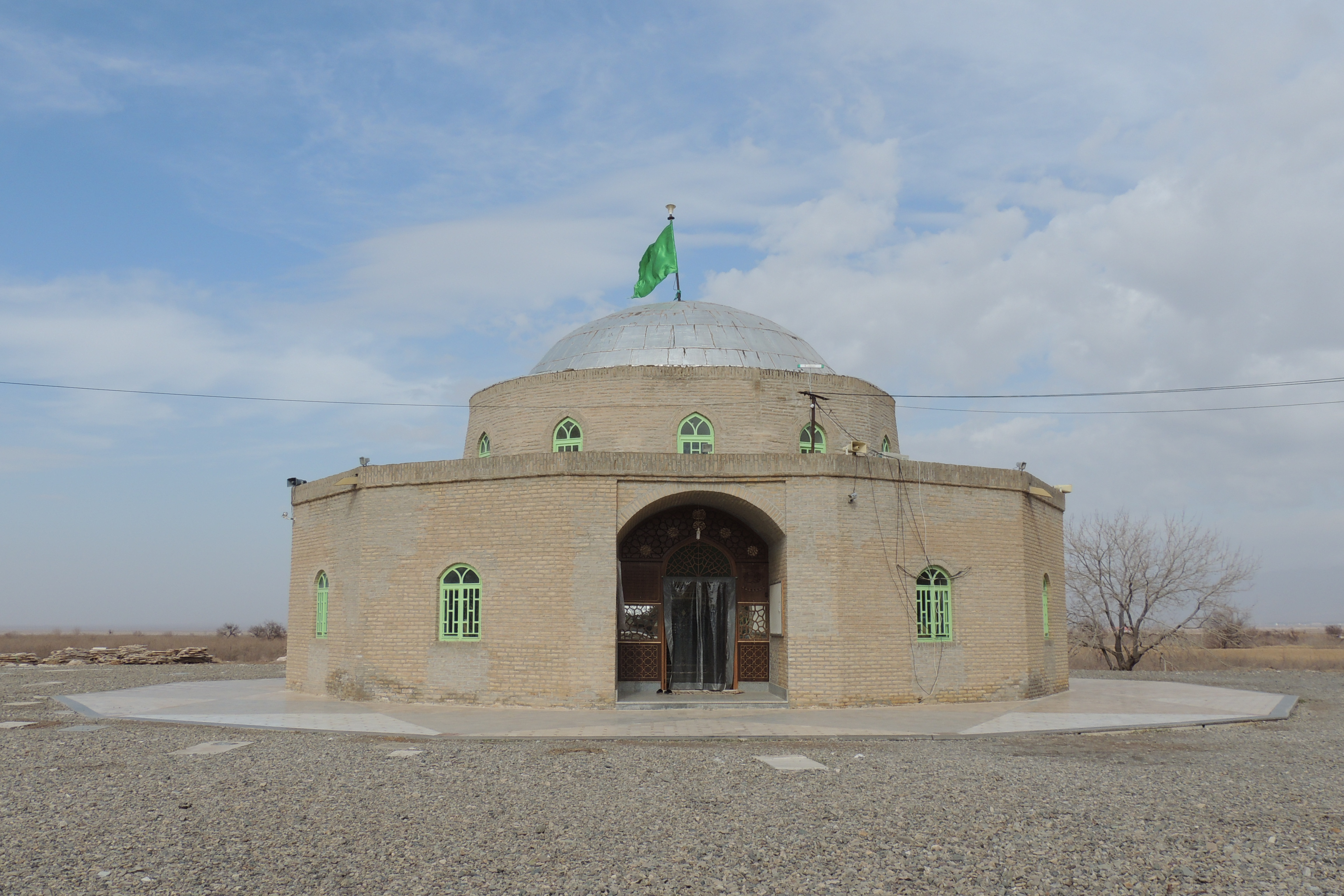
Imamzadeh Hassan

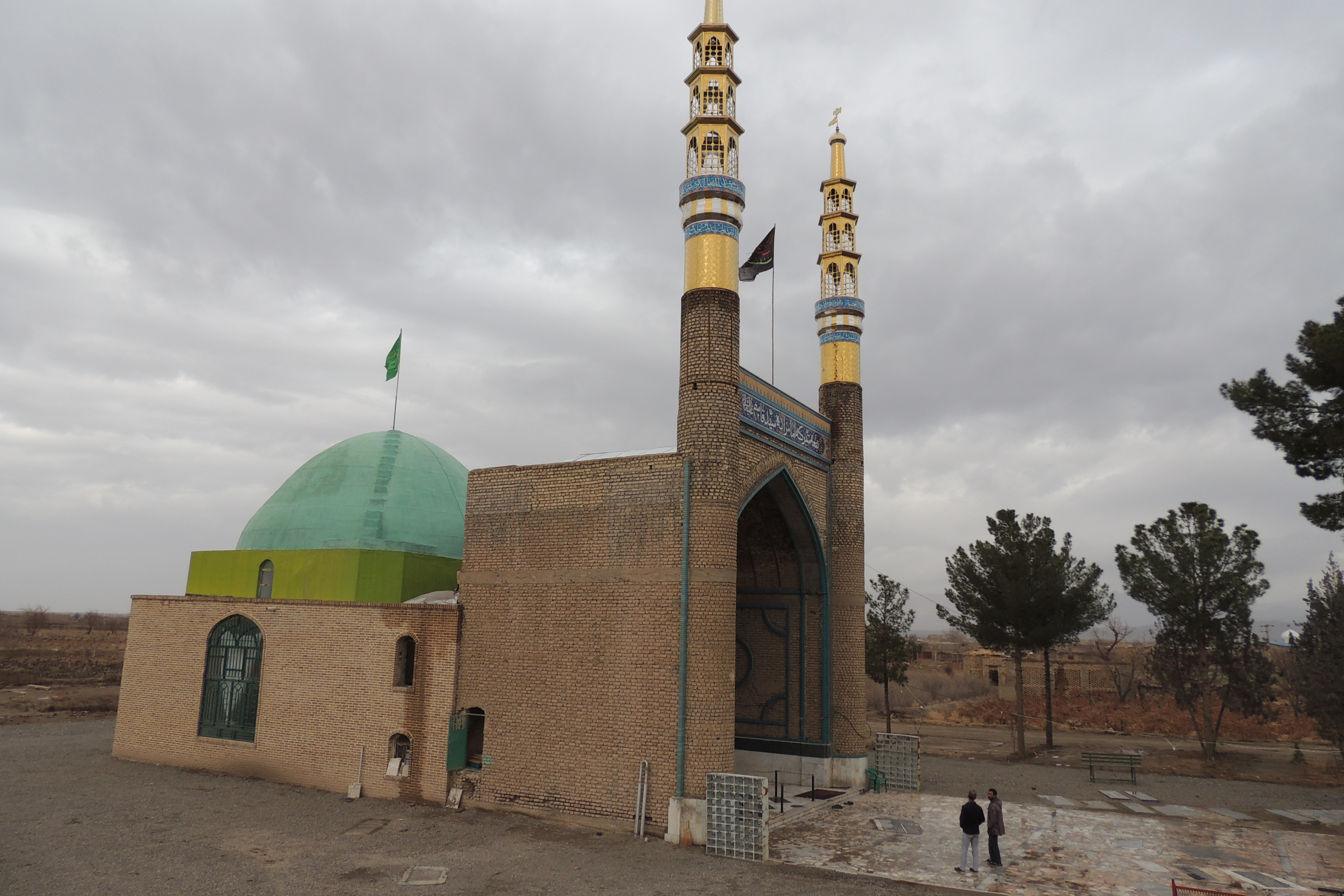
Imamzadeh Qasem

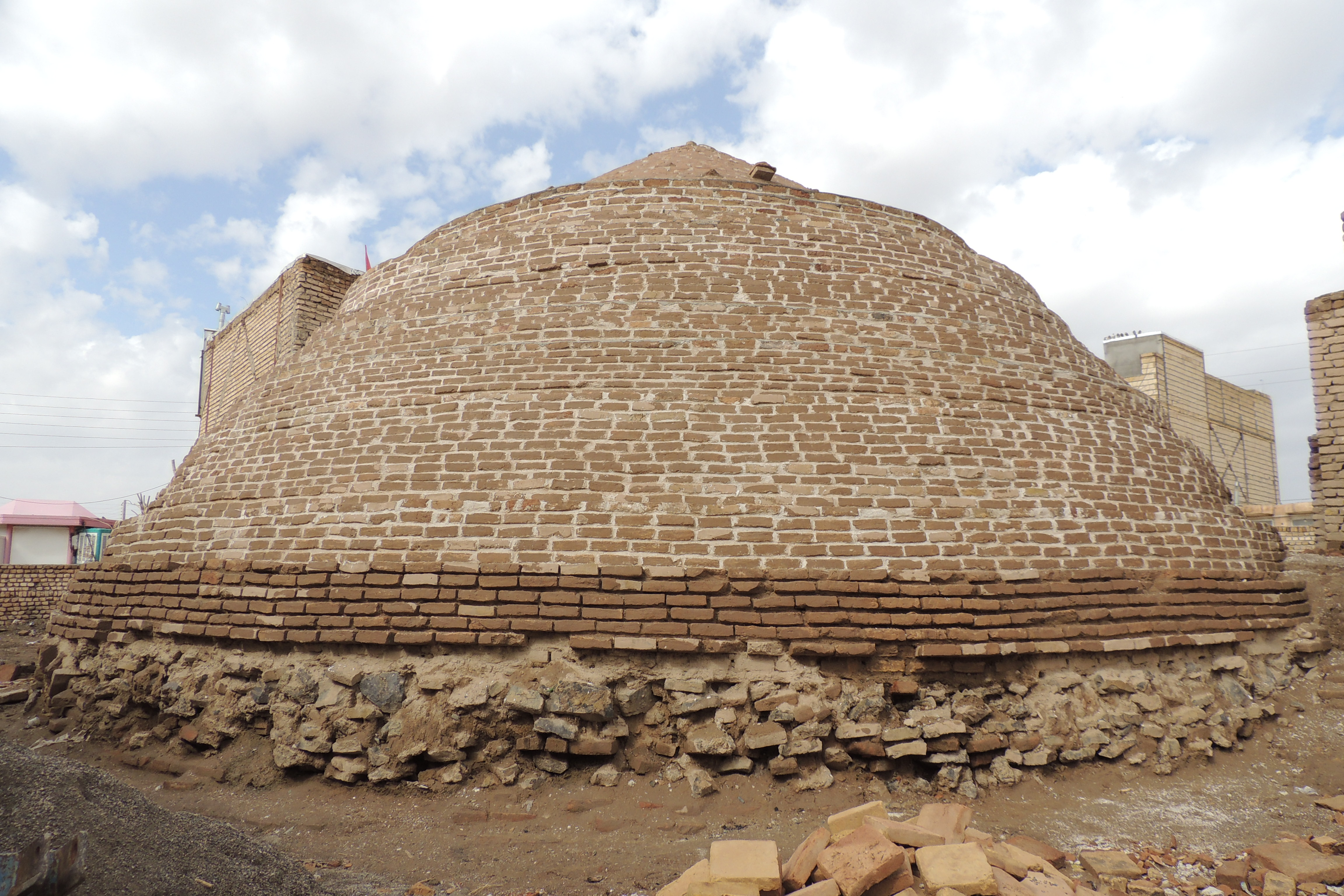
Ab anbar Kondor 2

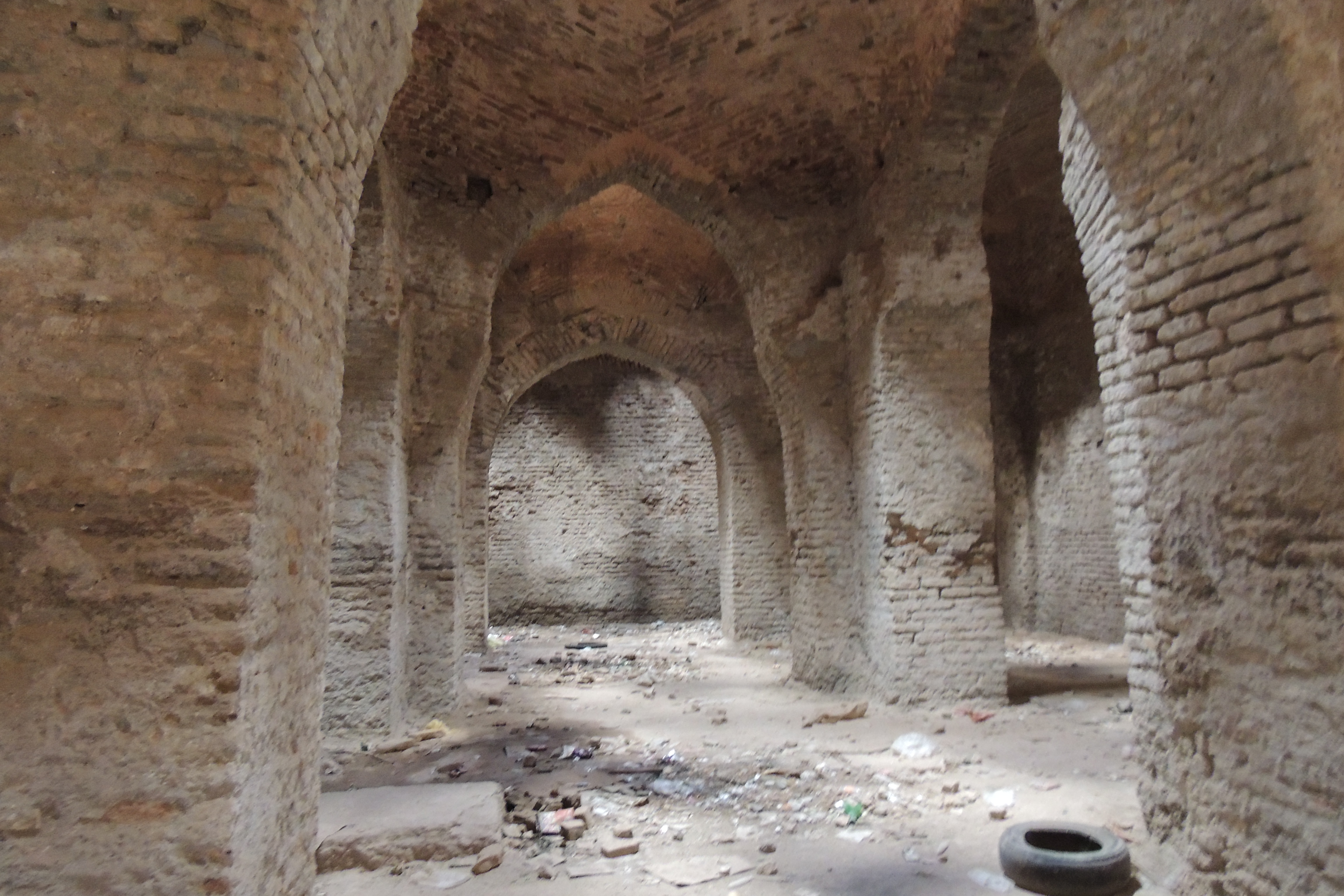
Ab anbar Kondor 1

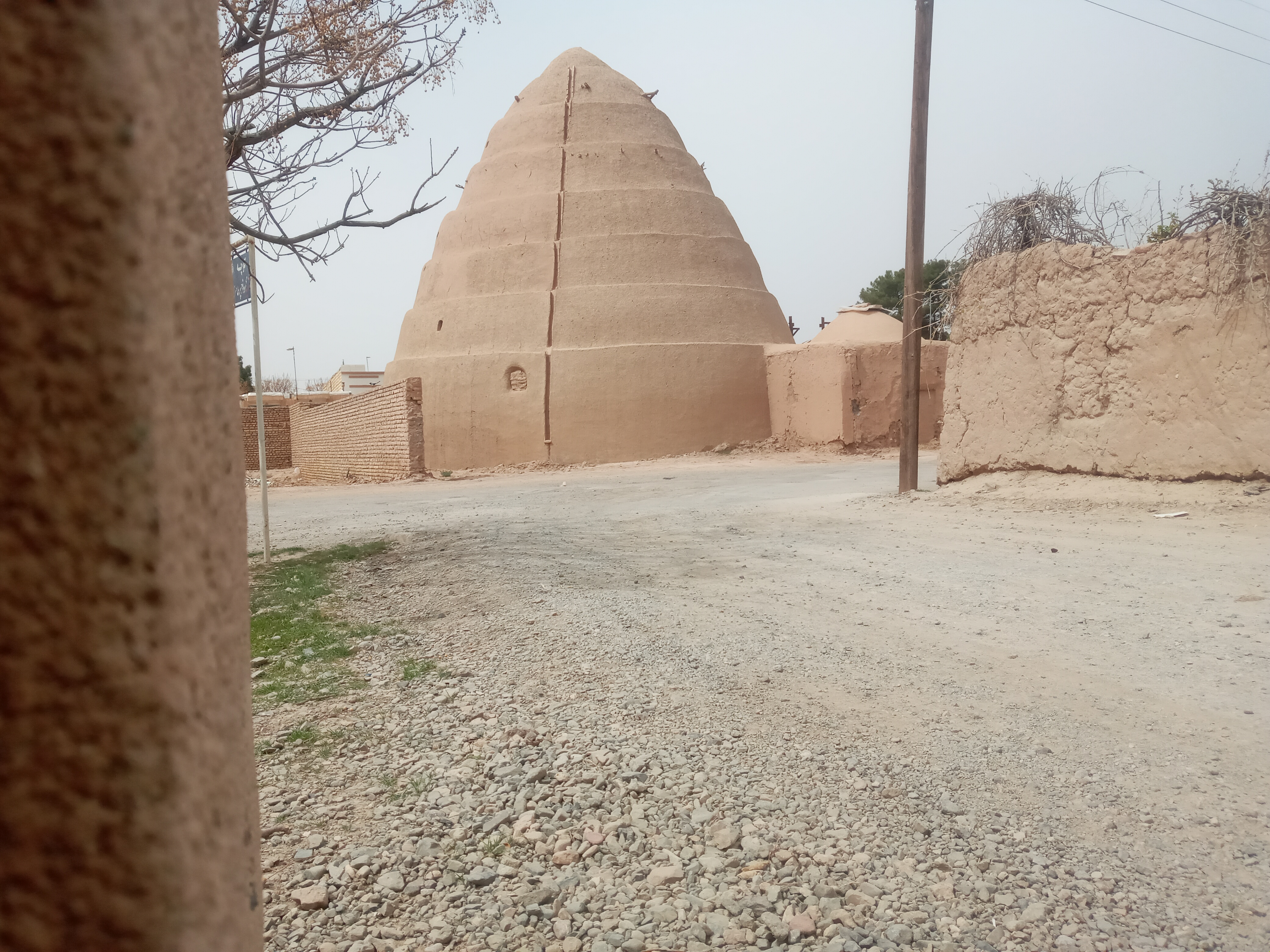
Yakhchāl of Geli

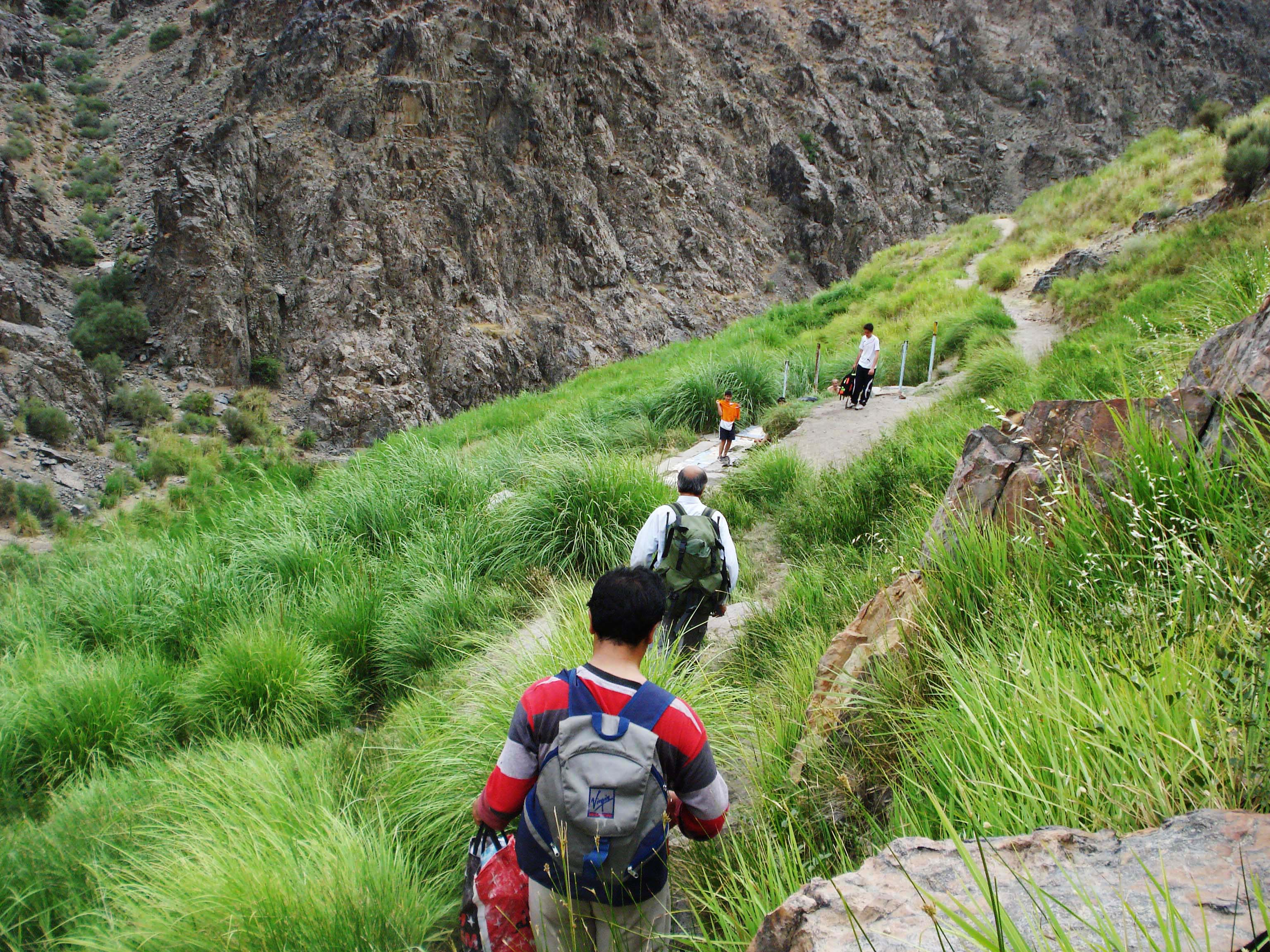
Khalilabad Hot Spring

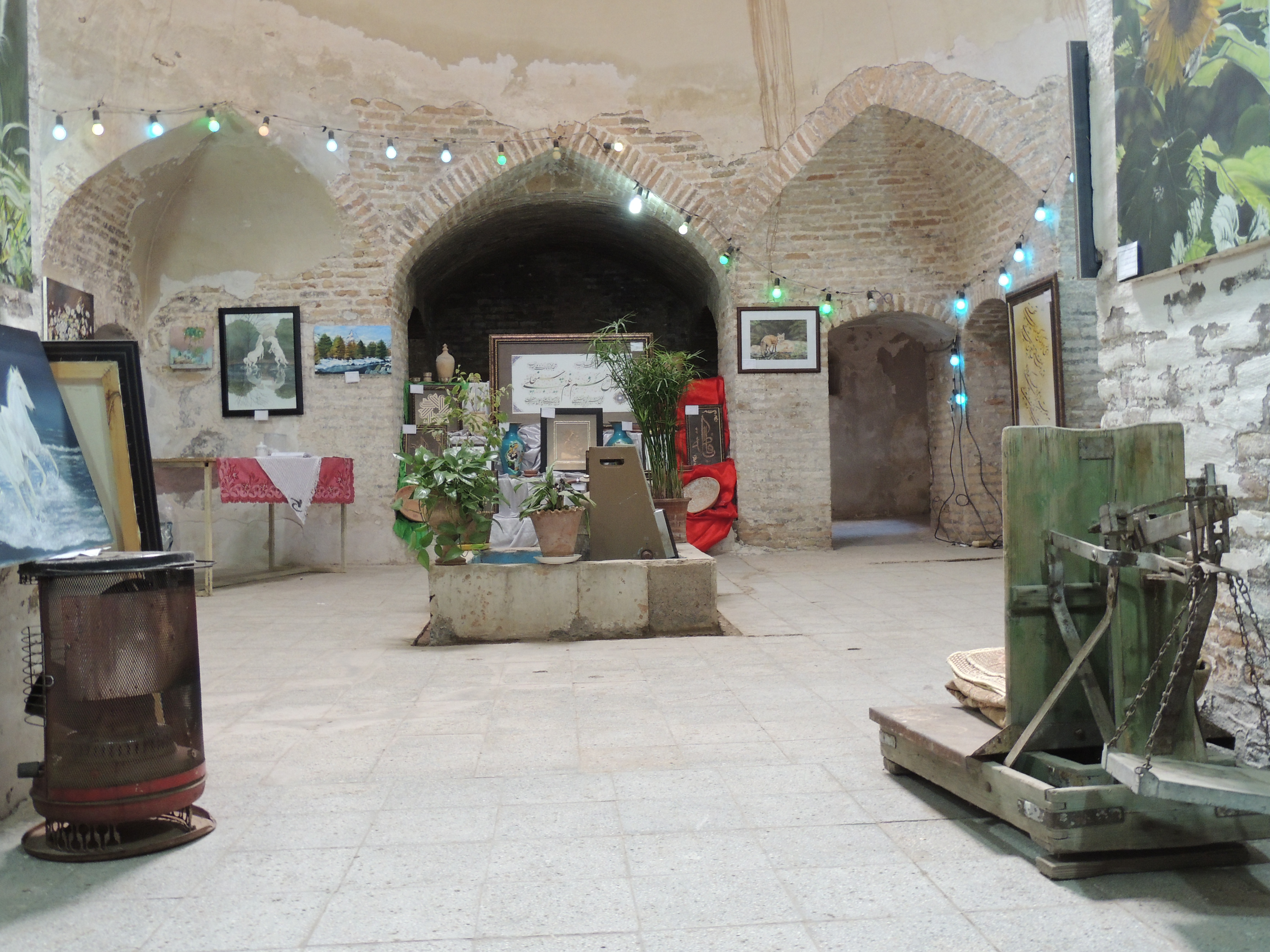
Beheshti Bathhouse

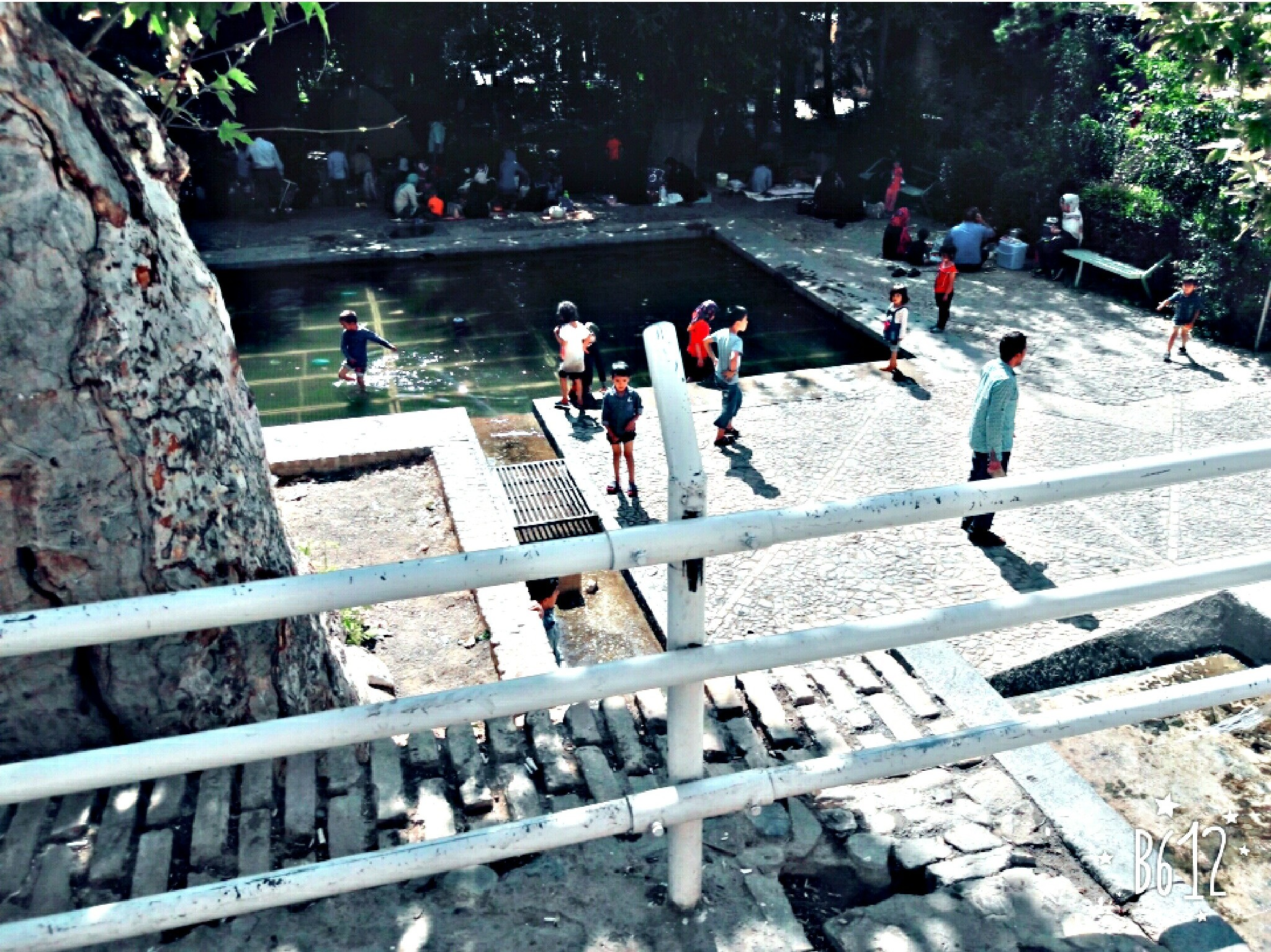
Qadamgah Hazrat Ali
