= Alireza Faghani =

Iranian football referee (born 1978)

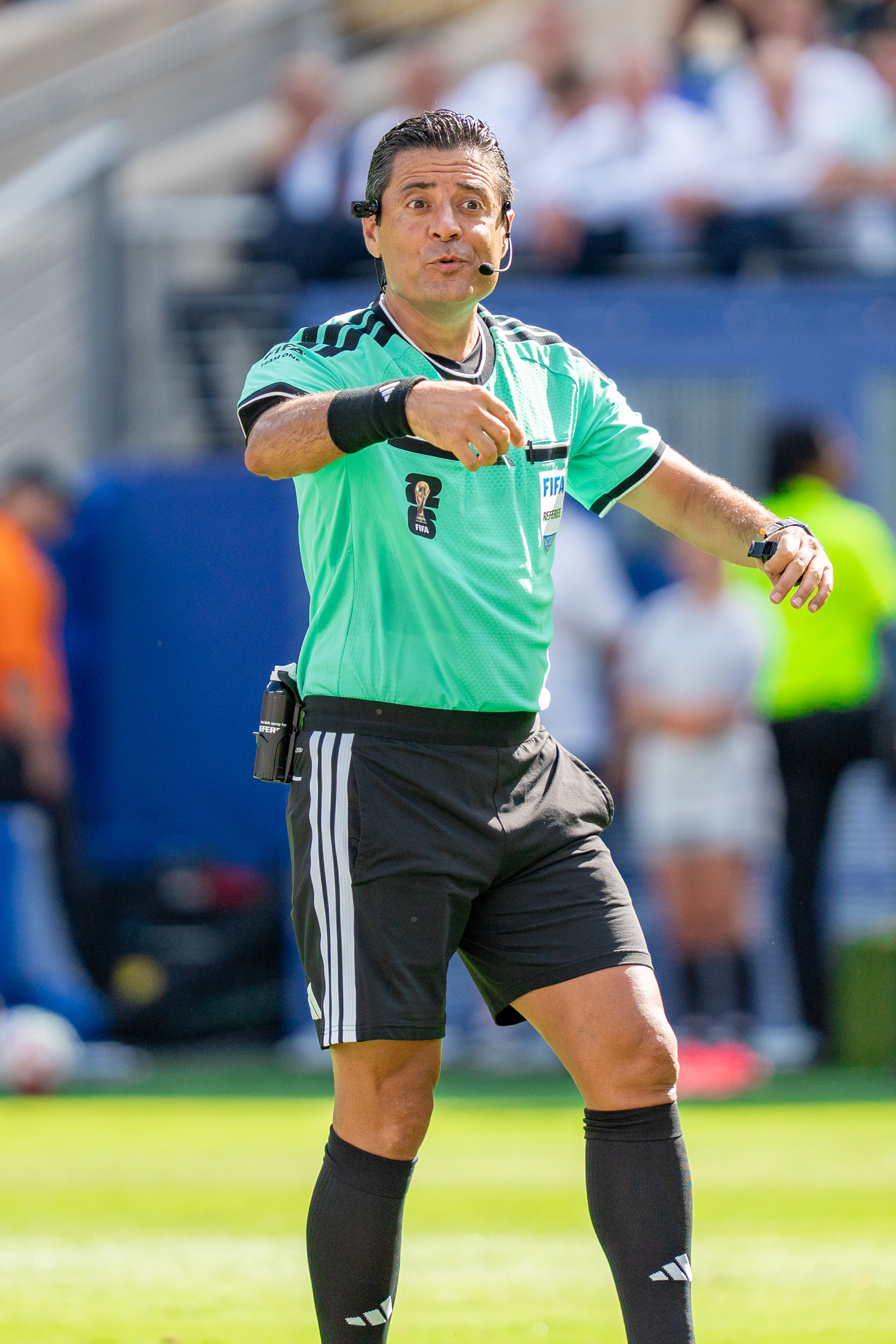
- Faghani at the 2026 FIFA World Cup
- Born: 21 March 1978 (age 48); Jabuz, Kashmar, Iran
- Other occupation: Municipality employee

Domestic
| Years | League | Role |
| 2000–2008 | (Iran) Azadegan League | Referee |
| 2007–2022 | (Iran) Persian Gulf Pro League | Referee |
| 2017 | (Indonesia) Liga 1 | Referee |
| 2019– | (Australia) (New Zealand) A-League Men | Referee |

International
| Years | League | Role |
| 2008–2019 | FIFA listed (Iran) | Referee |
| 2023– | FIFA listed (Australia) | Referee |

Alireza Faghani (Persian: عليرضا فغانى; born 21 March 1978) is a soccer referee and former player who referees in the A-League Men, and in international tournaments as a Football Australia referee since 2023.

Faghani has been on the international referees list for FIFA since 2008, and has refereed important matches such as the 2014 AFC Champions League final, the 2015 AFC Asian Cup final, the 2015 FIFA Club World Cup final, the 2016 Summer Olympics football final match, and 2025 FIFA Club World Cup final.

He officiated in the Persian Gulf Pro League from 2007 to 2022, Liga 1 for one season in 2017, 2017 FIFA Confederations Cup, 2018 FIFA World Cup, 2019 AFC Asian Cup, 2022 FIFA World Cup, 2023 AFC Asian Cup, AFC Champions League, AFC Champions League Two and AFC Challenge League and 2026 FIFA World Cup.

Faghani migrated from Iran to Australia in September 2019.

== Early life ==
Faghani was born on 21 March 1978 in Kashmar, a city near Mashhad in Iran. His nickname is Behrooz (بهروز). His father, Mohammad Faghani (محمد فغانی) was also a football referee. He has a younger brother named Mohammadreza, who referees in Australia.

== Playing career ==
Faghani was part of the youth team of Bank Melli, and also played for Shahab Khodro, Etka, and Niroye Zamini. He also played in Iran's League 2, the third tier of Iranian football.

== Refereeing career ==
Faghani became a FIFA referee in 2008, only a year after officiating in the top flight league in Iran. After only one year of international experience Faghani took charge of the 2009 AFC President's Cup Final which was played between Regar-TadAZ Tursunzoda and Dordoi-Dynamo Naryn which was won 2–0 by the hosts. A year later he was again in charge of a final in the 2010 AFC Challenge Cup.

He was named as the fourth referee for the opening match of the 2014 FIFA World Cup between Brazil and Croatia. He also refereed the 2014 AFC Champions League Final first leg match between Al-Hilal and Western Sydney Wanderers. He was also one of the officials of the 2015 AFC Asian Cup, refereeing his first match in Group B between Saudi Arabia and China that ended 0–1.

Faghani refereed the 2009 Bangladesh Super Cup final between Dhaka Mohammedan and Dhaka Abahani on 27 March 2009.

He was appointed to referee the 2015 AFC Asian Cup Final, which was contested by South Korea and Australia. Faghani was the referee in the 2015 FIFA Club World Cup Final between Club Atlético River Plate and FC Barcelona. He was also the referee in the 2016 Indian Super League final between Kerala Blasters and ATK. Faghani reffed the 2016 Olympic football final match between host Brazil and Germany.

Faghani was referee in six matches of the 2017 Liga 1 in Indonesia and two matches of the 2017 FIFA Confederations Cup in Russia.

Faghani was appointed to be a referee for the 2018 FIFA World Cup in Russia. After the conclusion of the round of 16, it was announced that Faghani was one of 17 referees who had been selected to be assigned matches for the remainder of the tournament.

He was also referee of the 2018 AFF Championship final between Vietnam – Malaysia in its 2nd leg. On 5 December 2018, it was announced that Faghani had been appointed to referee at the 2019 AFC Asian Cup in the United Arab Emirates.

In 2019, he and his family migrated from Iran to Australia, and he was subsequently signed on by the A-League to the full time match official panel. Since 2023, he is on the FIFA list of international referees from Australia. Faghani's decision to represent Australia was believed to be linked to his support for the Mahsa Amini protests, which resulted in the FFIRI delisting Faghani as an Iranian referee in retaliation.

In 2024, Faghani was selected to referee the 2023 AFC Asian Cup opener, representing Australia. During Jordan's 3–2 win over Iraq in the round of 16, Faghani controversially gave Iraqi striker Aymen Hussein a second yellow card for a goal celebration in the 76th minute, that mimicked an opposition celebration. After the game, a petition by Iraqi fans on change.org was made to call on Faghani's suspension, which accumulated over 800,000 signatures. The Asian Football Confederation issued a statement saying Faghani's decision was correct. Faghani received a torrent of social media abuse, leading to Football Australia issuing a statement saying that they are taking steps to protect and support their official.

On 14 April 2025, Faghani was named as a match official for the 2025 FIFA Club World Cup, representing Australia. Faghani and Australian assistant referees Anton Shchetinin and Ashley Beacham were selected to referee the opening match of the tournament at Hard Rock Stadium in Miami Gardens, Florida. After refereeing two group stage matches and a quarter-final match during the tournament, Faghani was selected to referee the 2025 FIFA Club World Cup final. After the Club World Cup final, Iranian state media criticized and threatened Faghani after having censored the award ceremony, while Iranian dissidents praised Faghani for his conduct during the tournament and described his presence at such a high-profile event as a source of national pride.

In April 2026, Faghani was named as a referee for the 2026 FIFA World Cup, representing Australia.

== Matches ==
=== FIFA World Cup ===
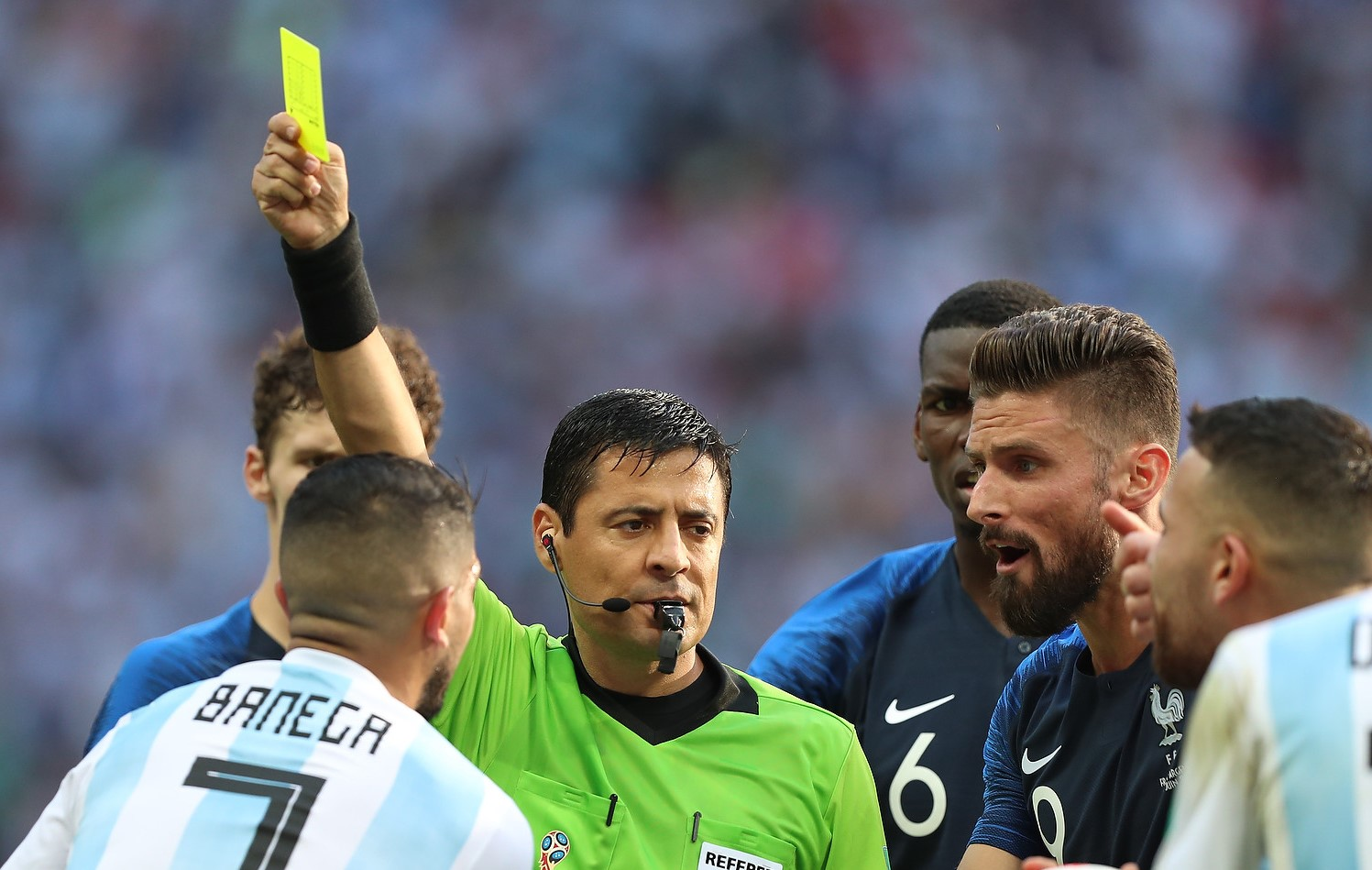
Alireza Faghani presents a yellow card during the France vs Argentina match in the round of 16 of 2018 FIFA World Cup.

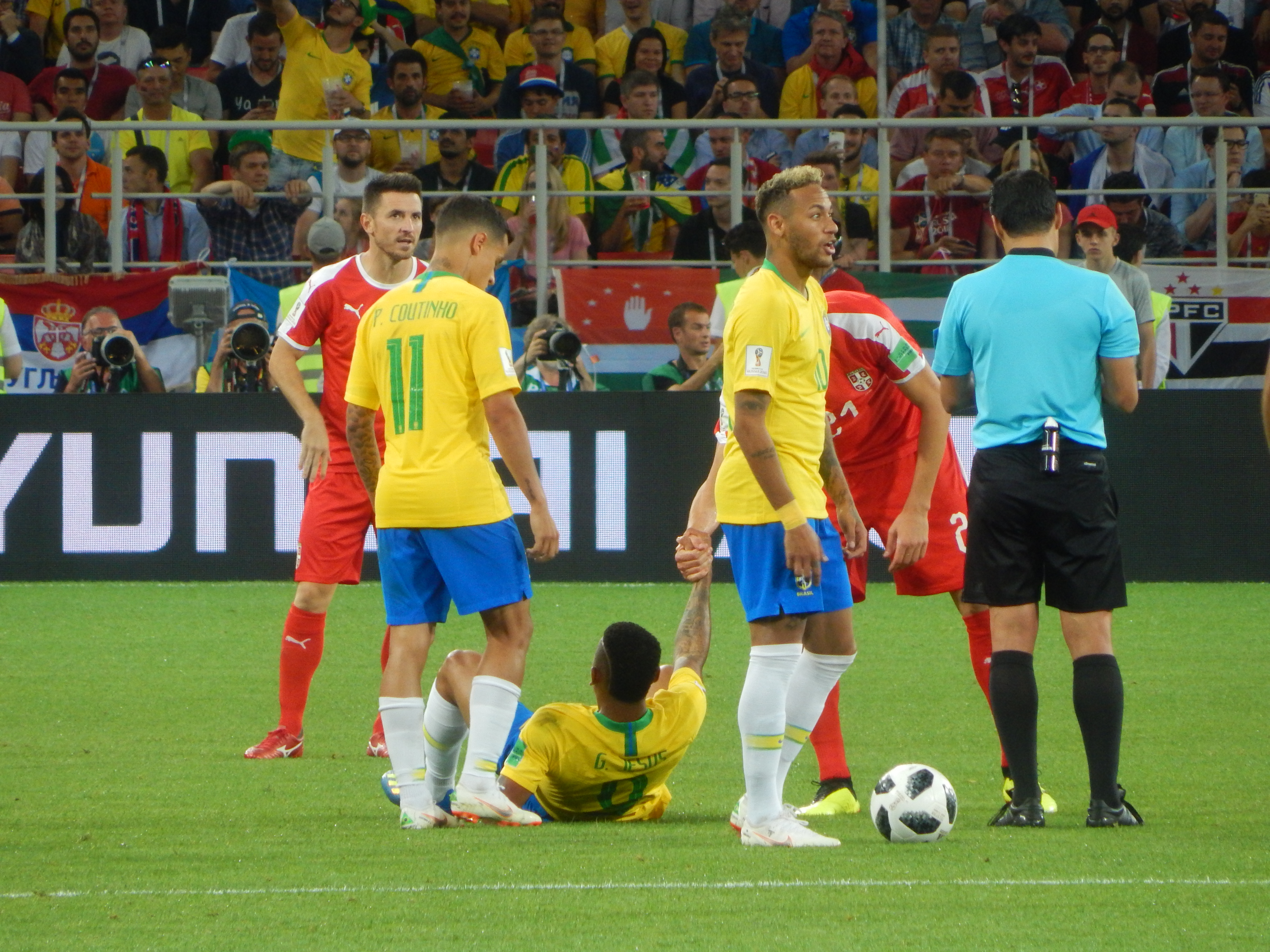
Alireza Faghani refereeing the Serbia vs Brazil match in the group stage of 2018 FIFA World Cup.

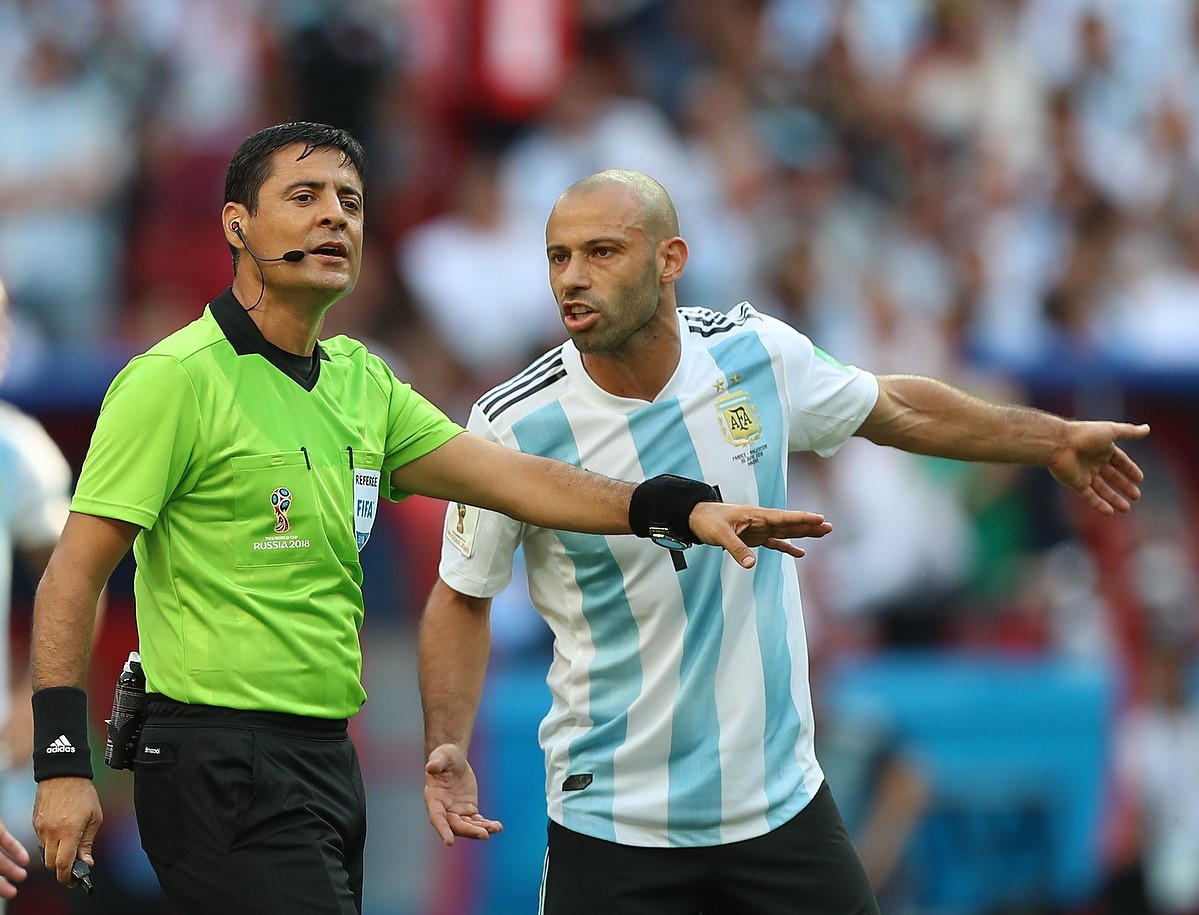
Alireza Faghani refereeing the France vs Argentina match in the round of 16 of 2018 FIFA World Cup.

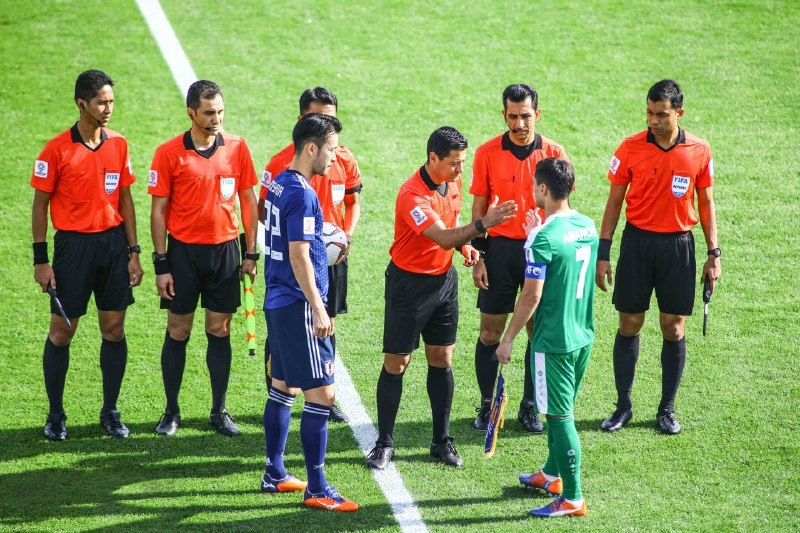
Alireza Faghani refereeing the Japan vs. Turkmenistan match in the 2019 AFC Asian Cup.

2018 FIFA World Cup – Russia
| Date | Match | Venue | Round |
|---|---|---|---|
| 17 June 2018 | Germany 0–1 Mexico | Moscow | Group stage |
| 27 June 2018 | Serbia 0–2 Brazil | Moscow | Group stage |
| 30 June 2018 | France 4–3 Argentina | Kazan | Round of 16 |
| 14 July 2018 | Belgium 2–0 England | Saint Petersburg | Match for third place |
2022 FIFA World Cup – Qatar
| Date | Match | Venue | Round |
| 24 November 2022 | Brazil 2–0 Serbia | Lusail | Group stage |
| 28 November 2022 | Portugal 2–0 Uruguay | Lusail | Group stage |
2026 FIFA World Cup – Canada/United States/Mexico
| Date | Match | Venue | Round |
| 16 June 2026 | France 3–1 Senegal | East Rutherford | Group stage |
| 27 June 2026 | Colombia 0–0 Portugal | Miami | Group stage |
| 5 July 2026 | Mexico 2–3 England | Mexico City | Round of 16 |

=== FIFA Confederations Cup ===
2017 FIFA Confederations Cup – Russia
| Date | Match | Venue | Round |
|---|---|---|---|
| 22 June 2017 | Germany 1–1 Chile | Kazan | Group stage |
| 27 June 2017 | Portugal 0–0 (0–3 p) Chile | Kazan | Semi-finals |

=== Summer Olympics ===
2016 Summer Olympics – Rio de Janeiro
| Date | Match | Venue | Round |
|---|---|---|---|
| 4 August 2016 | Mexico 2–2 Germany | Salvador | Group stage |
| 10 August 2016 | Denmark 0–4 Brazil | Salvador | Group stage |
| 20 August 2016 | Brazil 1–1 (5–4 p) Germany | Rio de Janeiro | Gold medal match |

=== AFC Asian Cup ===
2015 AFC Asian Cup – Australia
| Date | Match | Venue | Round |
|---|---|---|---|
| 10 January 2015 | Saudi Arabia 0–1 China | Brisbane | Group stage |
| 13 January 2015 | Kuwait 0–1 South Korea | Canberra | Group stage |
| 16 January 2015 | Iraq 0–1 Japan | Brisbane | Group stage |
| 23 January 2015 | Japan 1–1 (4–5 p) United Arab Emirates | Sydney | Quarter-finals |
| 31 January 2015 | South Korea 1–2 (a.e.t.) Australia | Sydney | Final |
2019 AFC Asian Cup – United Arab Emirates
| Date | Match | Venue | Round |
| 9 January 2019 | Japan 3–2 Turkmenistan | Abu Dhabi | Group stage |
| 20 January 2019 | Jordan 1–1 (2–4 p) Vietnam | Dubai | Round of 16 |
2023 AFC Asian Cup – Qatar
| Date | Match | Venue | Round |
| 12 January 2024 | Qatar 3–0 Lebanon | Lusail | Group stage |
| 29 January 2024 | Iraq 2–3 Jordan | Doha | Round of 16 |

=== FIFA Club World Cup ===
2013 FIFA Club World Cup – Morocco
| Date | Match | Venue | Round |
|---|---|---|---|
| 14 December 2013 | Raja Casablanca (Morocco) 2–1 (a.e.t.) (Mexico) C.F. Monterrey | Agadir | Quarter-finals |
| 21 December 2013 | Guangzhou F.C. (China) 2–3 (Brazil) Atlético Mineiro | Marrakesh | Third place match |
2015 FIFA Club World Cup – Japan
| Date | Match | Venue | Round |
| 16 December 2015 | Club América (Mexico) 2–1 (Democratic Republic of the Congo) TP Mazembe | Osaka | Match for fifth place |
| 20 December 2015 | River Plate (Argentina) 0–3 (Spain) FC Barcelona | Yokohama | Final |
2025 FIFA Club World Cup – United States
| Date | Match | Venue | Round |
| 14 June 2025 | Al Ahly SC (Egypt) 0–0 (United States) Inter Miami CF | Miami | Group Stage |
| 20 June 2025 | Bayern Munich (Germany) 2–1 (Argentina) Boca Juniors | Miami | Group Stage |
| 4 July 2025 | Palmeiras (Brazil) 1–2 (England) Chelsea | Philadelphia | Quarter-finals |
| 13 July 2025 | Chelsea (England) 3–0 (France) Paris Saint-Germain | East Rutherford | Final |

=== FIFA Intercontinental Cup ===
2024 FIFA Intercontinental Cup – Qatar
| Date | Match | Venue | Round |
|---|---|---|---|
| 14 December 2024 | Al-Ahly (Egypt) 0–0 (5–6 p) (Mexico); Pachuca | Doha | FIFA Challenger Cup |

== Statistics ==
| Tournaments | Contester | Years | Matches | Yellow card | (yellow card) Average | Red card | (red card) Average |
|---|---|---|---|---|---|---|---|
| FIFA World Cup | FIFA | 2018, 2022 | 6 | 26 | 4.50 | 0 | 0.00 |
| FIFA World Cup qualification (AFC) | FIFA | 2011– | 13 | 45 | 3.46 | 0 | 0.00 |
| FIFA Confederations Cup | FIFA | 2017 | 2 | 11 | 5.50 | 0 | 0.00 |
| Summer Olympics | IOC–FIFA | 2016 | 3 | 9 | 3.00 | 0 | 0.00 |
| Friendlies | FIFA | 2014– | 11 | 38 | 3.45 | 2 | 0.18 |
| AFC Asian Cup | AFC | 2015, 2019, 2023 | 9 | 35 | 3.89 | 2 | 0.22 |
| AFC Asian Cup qualification | AFC | 2015 | 2 | 6 | 3.00 | 0 | 0.00 |
| FIFA U-20 World Cup | FIFA | 2013 | 2 | 6 | 3.00 | 0 | 0.00 |
| FIFA Club World Cup | FIFA | 2012, 2013, 2015, 2025 | 4 | 18 | 4.50 | 1 | 0.06 |
| AFC Champions League | AFC | 2010–2018 | 64 | 255 | 3.98 | 8 | 0.13 |
| AFC Champions League qualification | AFC | 2011 | 1 | 3 | 3.00 | 0 | 0.00 |
| (India) Indian Super League | (India) AIFF | 2016 | 1 | 3 | 3.00 | 0 | 0.00 |
| (Indonesia) Indonesian Super League | (Indonesia) I-League | 2017 | 6 | 14 | 2.33 | 1 | 0.17 |
| (Iran) Persian Gulf Pro League | (Iran) FFIRI | 2007–2019 | ? | ? | ? | ? | ? |
| (Iran) Hazfi Cup | (Iran) FFIRI | 2015–2016 | 1 | 7 | 7.00 | 0 | 0.00 |
| (Iran) Azadegan League | (Iran) FFIRI | 2000–2008 | ? | ? | ? | ? | ? |
| (Australia) A-League Men | (Australia) FA | 2019– | 87 | 335 | 3.85 | 10 | 0.11 |
| Totals | | 2007– | 212+ | 831+ | 3.92 | 24+ | 0.11 |
Matches as referee are correct as of 30 January 2024

== Honours ==
- Iranian Referee of the Year: 2011, 2015, 2016, 2017, 2018
- Asian Referee of the Year: 2016, 2018

Sporting positions (Iran) / (Australia) Alireza Faghani
| Preceded by (Guatemala) Walter López Castellanos | 2015 FIFA Club World Cup final referee | Succeeded by (Zambia) Janny Sikazwe |
| Preceded by (Uzbekistan) Ravshan Irmatov | 2015 AFC Asian Cup final referee | Succeeded by (Uzbekistan) Ravshan Irmatov |
| Preceded by (United Kingdom) Mark Clattenburg | 2016 Men's Olympic Football Tournament final referee | Succeeded by (Australia) Chris Beath |
| Preceded by (Poland) Szymon Marciniak | 2025 FIFA Club World Cup final referee | Succeeded by TBD |
