= Irajabad, Razavi Khorasan =

Village in Razavi Khorasan province, Iran

Irajabad Persian: ايرج اباد
- Village
- Location within Iran
- Coordinates: 35°15′58″N 58°10′01″E
- Country: Iran
- Province: Razavi Khorasan
- County: Khalilabad
- District: Sheshtaraz
- Rural District: Sheshtaraz

Population (2016)
  - Total: 97
- Time zone: UTC+3:30 (IRST)

Irajabad (Persian: ايرج اباد) (Note: Also romanized as Īrajābād; also known as Ţarāz) is a village in Sheshtaraz Rural District of Sheshtaraz District in Khalilabad County, Razavi Khorasan province, Iran.

== Demographics ==
=== Population ===
At the time of the 2006 National Census, the village's population was 137 in 39 households. The following census in 2011 counted 111 people in 39 households. The 2016 census measured the population of the village as 97 people in 30 households.
