= Sonbol, Razavi Khorasan =

Village in Razavi Khorasan province, Iran

Sonbol Persian: سنبل
- Village
- Location within Iran
- Coordinates: 35°07′25″N 58°11′50″E
- Country: Iran
- Province: Razavi Khorasan
- County: Khalilabad
- District: Sheshtaraz
- Rural District: Kavir

Population (2016)
  - Total: 11
- Time zone: UTC+3:30 (IRST)

Sonbol (Persian: سنبل) is a village in Kavir Rural District of Sheshtaraz District in Khalilabad County, Razavi Khorasan province, Iran.

== Demographics ==
=== Population ===
At the time of the 2006 National Census, the village's population was 15 in five households. The following census in 2011 counted 17 people in five households. The 2016 census measured the population of the village as 11 people in four households.
