= Bezanjerd =

Village in Razavi Khorasan province, Iran

Bezanjerd بزنجرد (Persian)
- Village
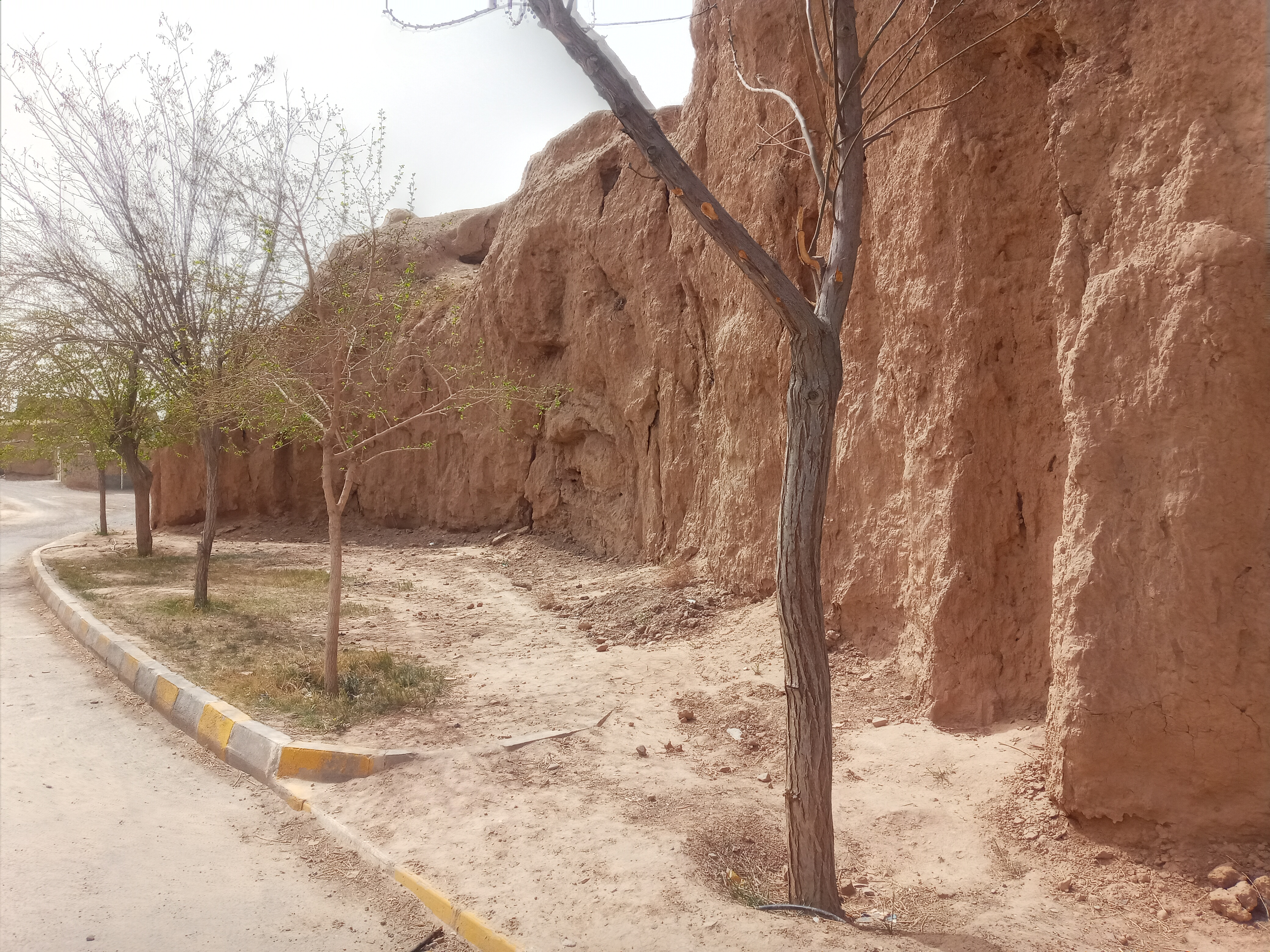
- Bezanjerd Castle

- Location within Iran
- Coordinates: 35°13′31″N 58°16′14″E
- Country: Iran
- Province: Razavi Khorasan
- County: Khalilabad
- District: Central
- Rural District: Rostaq

Population (2016)
  - Total: 1,245
- Time zone: UTC+3:30 (IRST)

Bezanjerd (Persian: بزنجرد) is a village in Rostaq Rural District of the Central District in Khalilabad County, Razavi Khorasan province, Iran.

== Demographics ==
=== Population ===
At the time of the 2006 National Census, the village's population was 1,289 in 350 households. The following census in 2011 counted 1,385 people in 422 households. The 2016 census measured the population of the village as 1,245 people in 402 households.
