= Rostaq Rural District (Khalilabad County) =

Rural district in Razavi Khorasan province, Iran

Rostaq Rural District Persian: دهستان رستاق
- Rural District
- Location within Iran
- Coordinates: 35°10′N 58°19′E
- Country: Iran
- Province: Razavi Khorasan
- County: Khalilabad
- District: Central
- Established: 1987
- Capital: Ebrahimabad

Population (2016)
  - Total: 8,441
- Time zone: UTC+3:30 (IRST)

Rostaq Rural District (Persian: دهستان رستاق) is in the Central District of Khalilabad County, Razavi Khorasan province, Iran. Its capital is the village of Ebrahimabad.

== Demographics ==
=== Population ===
At the time of the 2006 National Census, the rural district's population was 8,130 in 2,214 households. There were 8,478 inhabitants in 2,581 households at the following census of 2011. The 2016 census measured the population of the rural district as 8,441 in 2,748 households. The most populous of its 36 villages was Neqab, with 2,556 people.

=== Other villages in the rural district ===
- Bezanjerd
- Haft Khaneh
- Hoseynabad
- Kalateh-ye Shadi
- Mirabad
