= Kavir Rural District (Khalilabad County) =

Rural district in Razavi Khorasan province, Iran

Kavir Rural District Persian: دهستان كوير
- Rural District
- Location within Iran
- Coordinates: 35°03′N 58°12′E
- Country: Iran
- Province: Razavi Khorasan
- County: Khalilabad
- District: Sheshtaraz
- Established: 2003
- Capital: Sad ol Din

Population (2016)
  - Total: 6,359
- Time zone: UTC+3:30 (IRST)

Kavir Rural District (Persian: دهستان كوير) is in Sheshtaraz District of Khalilabad County, Razavi Khorasan province, Iran. Its capital is the village of Sad ol Din.

== Demographics ==
=== Population ===
At the time of the 2006 National Census, the rural district's population was 6,171 in 1,637 households. There were 6,149 inhabitants in 1,883 households at the following census of 2011. The 2016 census measured the population of the rural district as 6,359 in 2,059 households. The most populous of its 39 villages was Sad ol Din, with 1,931 people.

=== Other villages in the rural district ===
- Aliabad-e Shur
- Jafarabad
- Kaheh
- Mehdiabad
- Qohandiz
- Shur Ab
- Sonbol
