= Bezanjerd Castle =

Coordinates: 35.2250377°N 58.269987°E

- قلعه بزنجرد
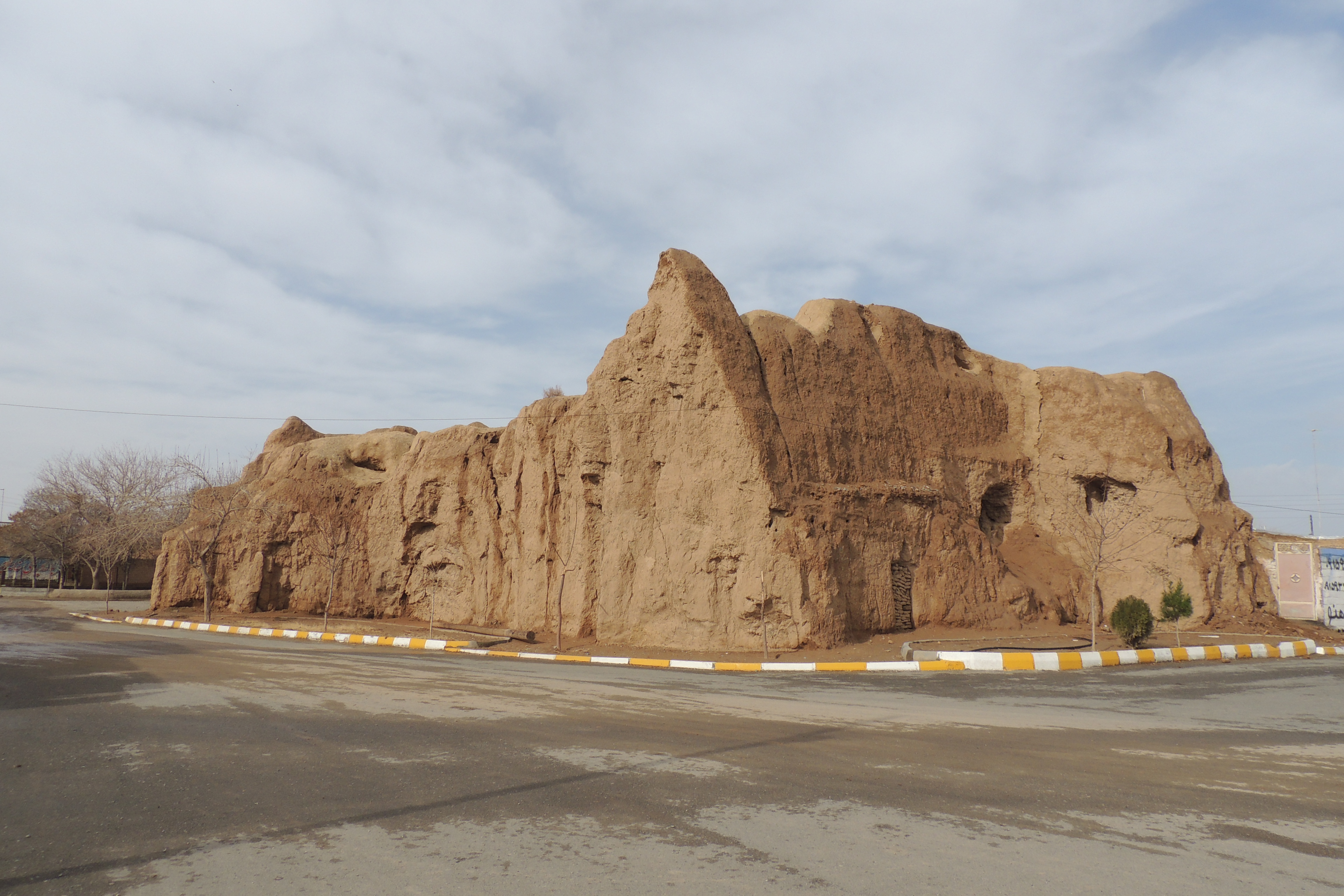
- Interactive map of the Bezanjerd Castle area

General information
- Type: Castle
- Location: Bezanjerd, Iran

Bezanjerd Castle (Persian: قلعه بزنجرد) is a historical castle located in Bezanjerd in Razavi Khorasan Province. The longevity of this fortress dates back to more than 200 years.
