= Kondor, Razavi Khorasan =

City in Razavi Khorasan province, Iran

Kondor Persian: کندر
- City
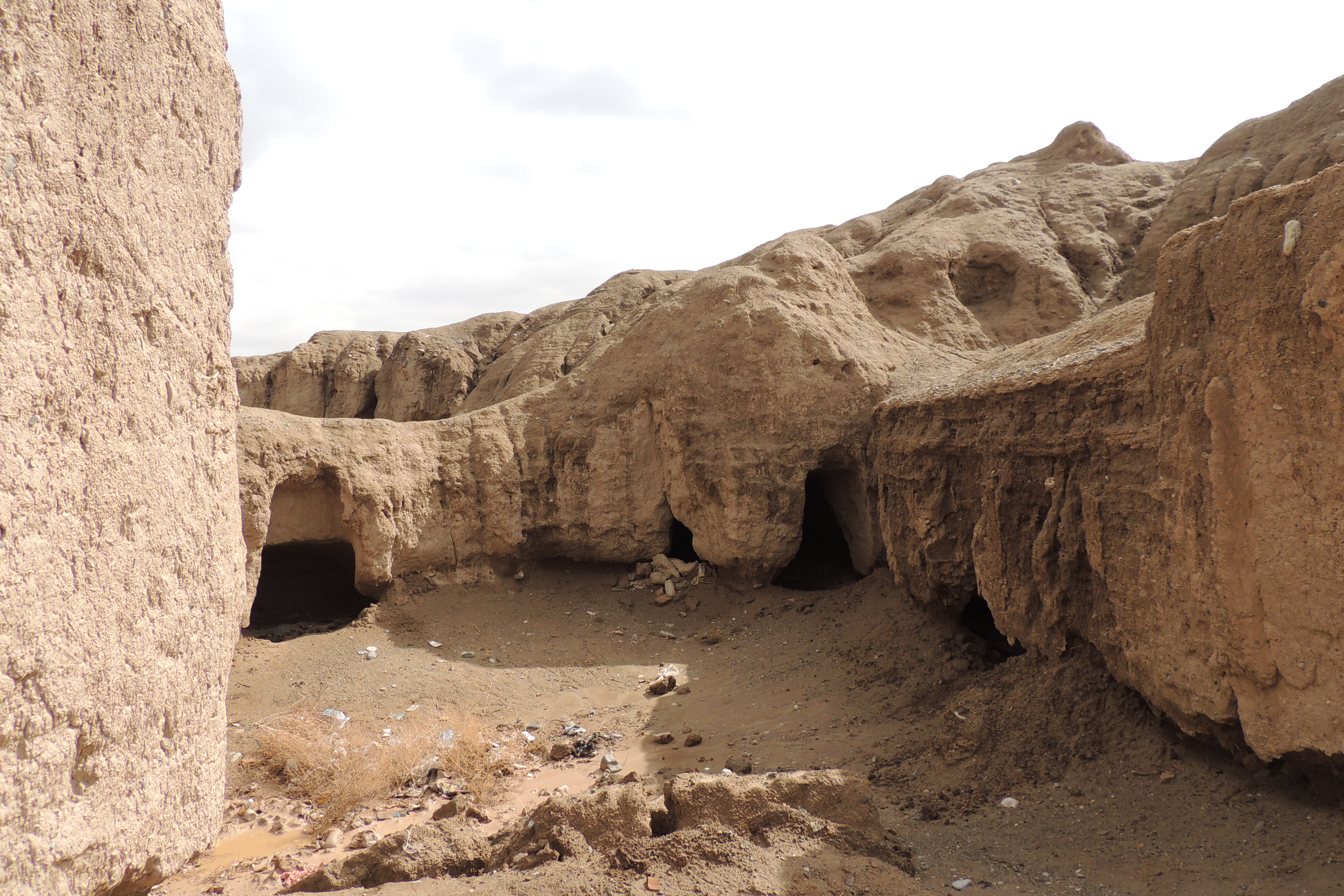
- Kondor Castle

- Location within Iran
- Coordinates: 35°12′43″N 58°08′59″E
- Country: Iran
- Province: Razavi Khorasan
- County: Khalilabad
- District: Sheshtaraz
- Established as a city: 2005

Population (2016)
  - Total: 6,460
- Time zone: UTC+3:30 (IRST)

Kondor (Persian: کندر) (Note: Also known as Kondowr and Kundar; English: frankincense) is a city in, and the capital of, Sheshtaraz District in Khalilabad County, Razavi Khorasan province, Iran. It also serves as the administrative center for Sheshtaraz Rural District. The village of Kondor was converted to a city in 2005.

== Demographics ==
=== Population ===
At the time of the 2006 National Census, the city's population was 5,700 in 1,610 households. The following census in 2011 counted 6,002 people in 1,895 households. The 2016 census measured the population of the city as 6,460 people in 2,130 households.

== Historical sites, ancient artifacts and tourism ==
=== Kondor Ab anbars ===
Kondor Ab anbars is two historical Ab anbars belongs to the first Pahlavi period and is located in Khalilabad County, Sheshtaraz District, Kondor village.

=== Kondor Castle ===
Kondor Castle is a historical castle located in Khalilabad County in Razavi Khorasan province, The longevity of this fortress dates back to the 5th to 7th centuries AH.

== Notable people ==
Al-Kunduri, a prominent Persian vizier of the Seljuq Empire, was from this city.
