= Said Sonbol =

Egyptian writer and editor

- Born: Said Sonbol
- Education: Fouad I University's Chemistry Department
- Occupation: writer editor
- Writing career
- Language: Arabic
- Genre: economic writing

Said Sonbol (Arabic: سعيد سنبل; 1929–2004), was an Egyptian writer and editor. He graduated from Fouad I University's Chemistry Department, and would eventually become a journalist starting at the Wafd mouthpiece Al-Misri. Sonbol became Al-Akhbar's first economic bureau chief in 1958, the paper's deputy editor-in-chief in 1961, its managing editor four years later, then chairman of the board of directors and editor-in-chief in 1985, a position he held until 1992.Under Anwar El-Sadat, he joined the Journalists' Syndicate, rising to deputy chairman when Ibrahim Nafie was syndicate chief.

Following the Tripartite Aggression, he got the inside story on the Anglo-Egyptian talks and Suez Canal negotiations. He was the first Arab journalist to uncover the secrets behind the rising tensions between Cuba and the US, and the first journalist to whom Castro confided that the US was planning to invade his country. He pioneered a television talk show dedicated to the discussion of national concerns, Egypt's economic problems above all. He counted among his happiest moments the day he received the national medal of honour, and the day the UN notified him that he—only 35 at the time—had been chosen to represent Africa in an economic studies programme that took him to Addis Ababa, Geneva, New York and Washington, D.C.

In 1976, he suffered a heart ailment necessitating surgical intervention, which was performed by the noted specialist, Magdi Yacoub.

Even after his retirement he continued to write, producing his Sabah Al-Kheir (Good Morning) column until the last days of his life.
