= Sheshtaraz Rural District =

Rural district in Razavi Khorasan province, Iran

Sheshtaraz Rural District Persian: دهستان ششطراز
- Rural District
- Location within Iran
- Coordinates: 35°13′N 58°09′E
- Country: Iran
- Province: Razavi Khorasan
- County: Khalilabad
- District: Sheshtaraz
- Established: 1987
- Capital: Kondor

Population (2016)
  - Total: 7,096
- Time zone: UTC+3:30 (IRST)

Sheshtaraz Rural District (Persian: دهستان ششطراز) is in Sheshtaraz District of Khalilabad County, Razavi Khorasan province, Iran. It is administered from the city of Kondor.

== Demographics ==
=== Population ===
At the time of the 2006 National Census, the rural district's population was 6,352 in 1,775 households. There were 6,801 inhabitants in 2,101 households at the following census of 2011. The 2016 census measured the population of the rural district as 7,096 in 2,286 households. The most populous of its 21 villages was Jabuz, with 3,639 people.

=== Other villages in the rural district ===
- Argha
- Irajabad
- Tak Mar
