= Central District (Khalilabad County) =

District in Razavi Khorasan province, Iran

Central District (Khalilabad County) Persian: بخش مرکزی شهرستان خليل آباد
- District
- Location within Iran
- Coordinates: 35°15′N 58°16′E
- Country: Iran
- Province: Razavi Khorasan
- County: Khalilabad
- Established: 2003
- Capital: Khalilabad

Population (2016)
  - Total: 31,786
- Time zone: UTC+3:30 (IRST)

The Central District of Khalilabad County (Persian: بخش مرکزی شهرستان خليل آباد) is in Razavi Khorasan province, Iran. Its capital is the city of Khalilabad.

== Demographics ==
=== Population ===
At the time of the 2006 National Census, the district's population was 26,770 in 7,276 households. The following census in 2011 counted 30,159 people in 9,013 households. The 2016 census measured the population of the district as 31,786 inhabitants in 10,209 households.

=== Administrative divisions ===
Central District (Khalilabad County) Population
Administrative Divisions	2006	2011	2016
Howmeh RD	10,231	10,587	10,594
Rostaq RD	8,130	8,478	8,441
Khalilabad (city)	8,409	11,094	12,751
Total	26,770	30,159	31,786
RD = Rural District
