= Sheshtaraz District =

District in Razavi Khorasan province, Iran

Sheshtaraz District Persian: بخش ششطراز
- District
- Location within Iran
- Coordinates: 35°06′N 58°12′E
- Country: Iran
- Province: Razavi Khorasan
- County: Khalilabad
- Established: 2003
- Capital: Kondor

Population (2016)
  - Total: 19,915
- Time zone: UTC+3:30 (IRST)

Sheshtaraz District (Persian: بخش ششطراز) is in Khalilabad County, Razavi Khorasan province, Iran. Its capital is the city of Kondor.

== Demographics ==
=== Population ===
At the time of the 2006 National Census, the district's population was 18,223 in 5,022 households. The following census in 2011 counted 18,952 people in 5,879 households. The 2016 census measured the population of the district as 19,915 inhabitants in 6,475 households.

=== Administrative divisions ===
Sheshtaraz District Population
Administrative Divisions	2006	2011	2016
Kavir RD	6,171	6,149	6,359
Sheshtaraz RD	6,352	6,801	7,096
Kondor (city)	5,700	6,002	6,460
Total	18,223	18,952	19,915
RD = Rural District
