= Khalilabad County =

County in Razavi Khorasan Province, Iran

Khalilabad County Persian: شهرستان خليل آباد
- County
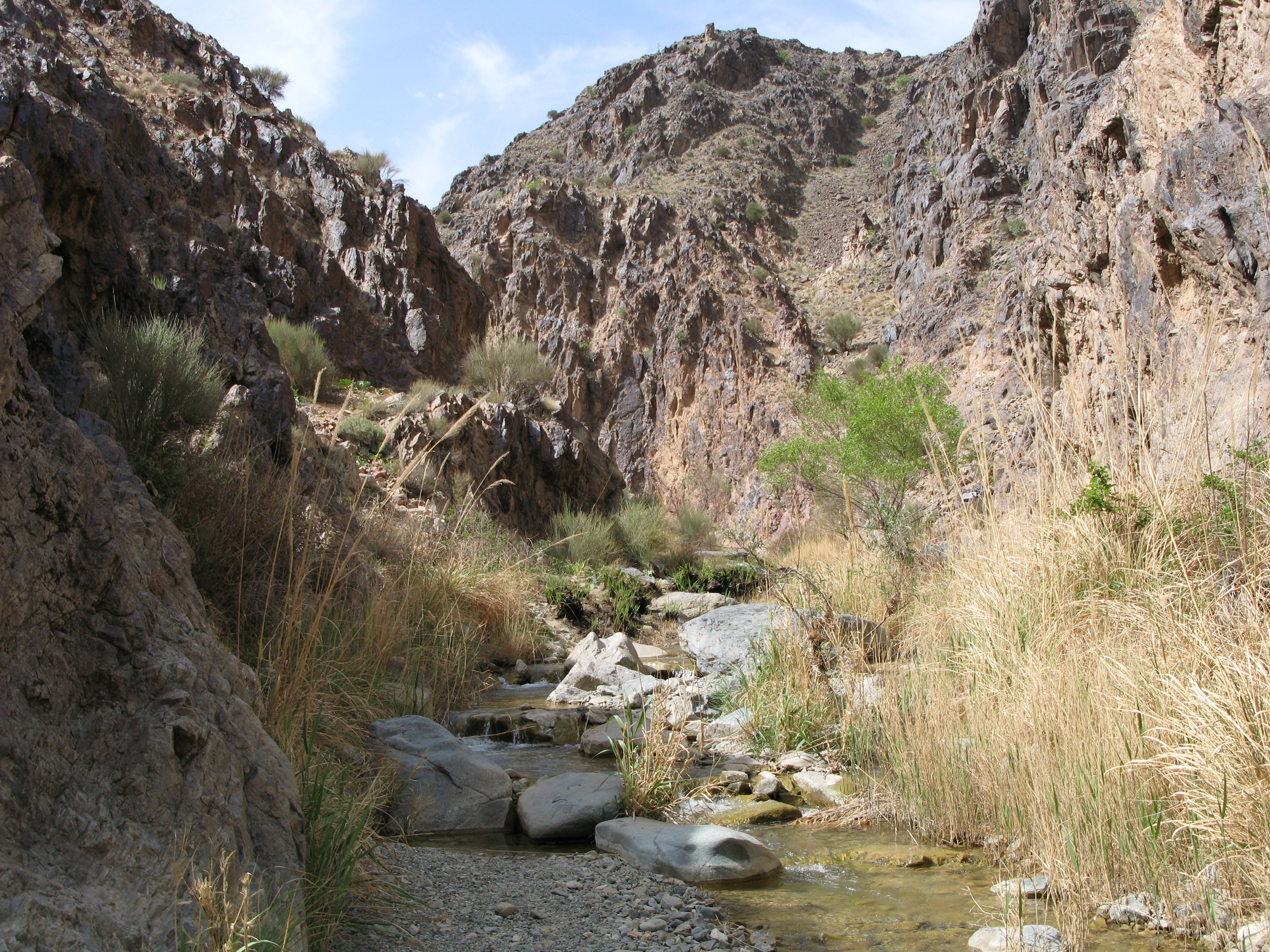
- Stream in Khalilabad during summertime

- Location of Khalilabad County in Razavi Khorasan province (center left, pink)

- Location of Razavi Khorasan province in Iran
- Coordinates: 35°10′N 58°12′E
- Country: Iran
- Province: Razavi Khorasan
- Established: 2003
- Capital: Khalilabad
- Districts: Central, Sheshtaraz

Area
  - Total: 1,121 km^{2} (433 sq mi)

Population (2016)
  - Total: 51,701
  - Density: 46.12/km^{2} (119.5/sq mi)
- Time zone: UTC+3:30 (IRST)

Khalilabad County (Persian: شهرستان خليل آباد) is in Razavi Khorasan province, Iran. Its capital is the city of Khalilabad.

== Demographics ==
=== Population ===
At the time of the 2006 National Census, the county's population was 44,993 in 12,298 households. The following census in 2011 counted 49,111 people in 14,879 households. The 2016 census measured the population of the county as 51,701 in 16,684 households.

=== Administrative divisions ===
Khalilabad County's population history and administrative structure over three consecutive censuses are shown in the following table.

Khalilabad County Population
Administrative Divisions	2006	2011	2016
Central District	26,770	30,159	31,786
Howmeh RD	10,231	10,587	10,594
Rostaq RD	8,130	8,478	8,441
Khalilabad (city)	8,409	11,094	12,751
Sheshtaraz District	18,223	18,952	19,915
Kavir RD	6,171	6,149	6,359
Sheshtaraz RD	6,352	6,801	7,096
Kondor (city)	5,700	6,002	6,460
Total	44,993	49,111	51,701
RD = Rural District

== See also ==
Media related to Khalilabad County at Wikimedia Commons
